= History of Sierra Leone =

Sierra Leone first became inhabited by indigenous African peoples at least 2,500 years ago. The Limba were the first tribe known to inhabit Sierra Leone. The dense tropical rainforest partially isolated the region from other West African cultures, and it became a refuge for peoples escaping violence. Sierra Leone was named by Portuguese explorer Pedro de Sintra, who mapped the region in 1462. The Freetown estuary provided a good natural harbour for ships to shelter and replenish drinking water, and gained more international attention as coastal and trans-Atlantic trade supplanted

In the mid-16th century, the Mane subjugated nearly all of the indigenous coastal peoples, and militarised Sierra Leone. The Mane soon blended with the local populations and the various chiefdoms and kingdoms remained in a continual state of conflict, with many captives sold to European slave-traders. The Atlantic slave trade had a significant impact on Sierra Leone, as this trade flourished in the 17th and 18th centuries, and later as a centre of anti-slavery efforts when the trade was abolished in 1807. British abolitionists had organised a colony for Black Loyalists at Freetown, and this became the capital of British West Africa. A naval squadron was based there to intercept slave ships, and the colony quickly grew as Liberated Africans were released, joined by Afro-Caribbean and African soldiers who had fought for Britain in the American Revolutionary War. The descendants of the Black settlers were collectively referred to as the Creoles or Krios.

During the colonial era, the British and Creoles increased their control over the surrounding area, securing peace so that commerce would not be interrupted, suppressing slave-trading and inter-chiefdom war. In 1895, Britain drew borders for Sierra Leone which they declared to be their protectorate, leading to armed resistance and the Hut Tax War of 1898. Thereafter, there was dissent and reforms as the Creoles sought political rights, trade unions formed against colonial employers, and peasants sought greater justice from their chiefs.

Sierra Leone has played a significant part in modern African political liberty and nationalism. In the 1950s, a new constitution united the Crown Colony and Protectorate, which had previously been governed separately. Sierra Leone gained independence from the United Kingdom on 27 April 1961 and became a member of the Commonwealth of Nations. Ethnic and linguistic divisions remain an obstacle to national unity, with the Mende, Temne and Creoles as rival power blocs. Roughly half of the years since independence have been marked by autocratic governments or civil war.

== Early history ==
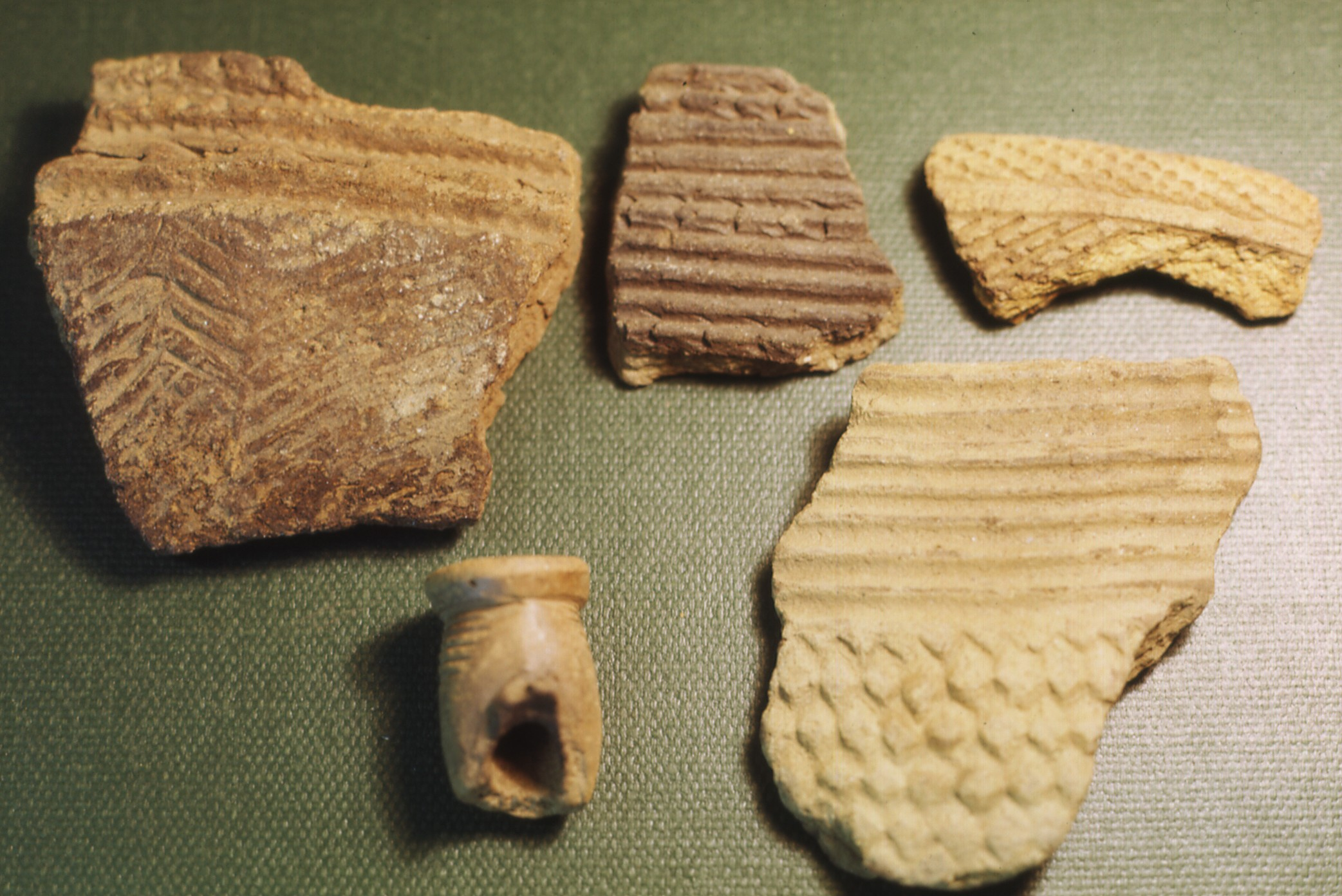
Fragments of prehistoric pottery from Kamabai Rock Shelter

Archaeological finds show that Sierra Leone has been inhabited continuously for at least 2,500 years, populated by successive movements of peoples from other parts of Africa. The use of iron was introduced to Sierra Leone by the 9th century, and by the end of the 10th century agriculture was being practiced by coastal tribes.

Sierra Leone's dense tropical rainforest partially isolated the land from other African cultures.

European contacts with Sierra Leone were among the first in West Africa. In 1462, Portuguese explorer Pedro de Sintra mapped the hills surrounding what is now Freetown Harbour, naming the oddly shaped formation Serra Lyoa (Lioness Mountain).

At this time the country was inhabited by numerous politically independent native groups. Several different languages were spoken, but there was similarity of religion. In the coastal rainforest belt there were Bulom-speakers between the Sherbro and Freetown estuaries, Loko-speakers north of the Freetown estuary to the Little Scarcies River, Temne-speakers found at the mouth of the Scarcies River, and Limba-speakers farther up the Scarcies. In the hilly savannah north of all of these lands were the Susu and Fula tribes. The Susu traded regularly with the coastal peoples along river valley routes, bringing salt, clothes woven by the Fula, iron work, and gold.

== European contact (15th century) ==
Portuguese ships began visiting Sierra Leone regularly in the late 15th century, and for a while they maintained a fort on the north shore of the Freetown estuary. This estuary is one of the largest natural deep-water harbours in the world, and one of the few good harbours on West Africa's surf-battered "Windward Shore" (Liberia to Senegal). It soon became a favourite destination of European mariners, to shelter and replenish drinking water. Some of the Portuguese sailors stayed permanently, trading and intermarrying with the local people.

=== Slavery ===
Slavery, and in particular the Atlantic slave trade, had a great effect on the region—socially, economically and politically—from the late 15th to the mid-19th centuries.

There had been lucrative trans-Saharan trade of slaves in West Africa from the 6th century. At its peak (c. 1350) the Mali Empire surrounded the region of modern-day Sierra Leone and Liberia, though the slave trade may not have significantly penetrated the coastal rainforest. The peoples who migrated into Sierra Leone from this time would have had greater contact with the indigenous slave trade, either practising it or escaping it.

When Europeans first arrived at Sierra Leone, slavery among the African peoples of the area was believed to be rare. According to historian Walter Rodney, the Portuguese mariners kept detailed reports, and so it is likely if slavery had been an important local institution that the reports would have described it. There was mention of a very particular kind of slavery in the region, which was:

a person in trouble in one kingdom could go to another and place himself under the protection of its king, whereupon he became a "slave" of that king, obliged to provide free labour and liable for sale.

According to Rodney, such a person would likely have retained some rights and had some opportunity to rise in status as time passed.

The European colonization of the Americas soon led to labour demands from nascent colonies; this led Europeans to seek a supply of slaves to transport to the Americas. Initially, European slavers launched raids on coastal villages to abduct Africans and sell them into slavery. However, they soon established economic alliances with local leaders, as many chiefs were willing to sell undesirable members of their tribe to Europeans. Other African chiefs launched raids on rival tribes in order to sell captives of such raids into slavery.

This early slaving was essentially an export business. The use of slaves as labourers by the local Africans appears to have developed only later. It may first have occurred under coastal chiefs in the late 18th century:

The slave owners were originally white and foreigners, but the late eighteenth century saw the emergence of powerful slave-trading chiefs, who were said to own large numbers of 'domestic slaves'.

For example, in the late 18th century, William Cleveland, a Scottish leader in Africa had a large "slave town" on the mainland opposite the Banana Islands, whose inhabitants "were employed in cultivating extensive rice fields, described as being some of the largest in Africa at the time". The existence of an indigenous slave town was recorded by an English traveler in 1823. Known in the Fula language as a rounde, it was connected with the Sulima Susu's capital city, Falaba. Its inhabitants worked at farming.

Rodney has postulated two means by which slaving for export could have caused a local practice of using slaves for labour to develop:

1. Not all war captives offered for sale would have been bought by the Portuguese, so their captors had to find something else to do with them. Rodney believes that executing them was rare and that they would have been used for local labour.
2. There is a time lag between the time a slave is captured and the time he or she is sold. Thus there would often have been a pool of slaves awaiting sale, who would have been put to work.

There are possible additional reasons for the adoption of slavery by the locals to meet their labour requirements:

1. The Europeans provided an example for imitation.
2. Once slaving in any form is accepted, it may smash a moral barrier to exploitation and make its adoption in other forms seem a relatively minor matter.
3. Export slaving entailed the construction of a coercive apparatus which could have been subsequently turned to other ends, such as policing a captive labour force.
4. The sale of local produce (e.g., palm kernels) to Europeans opened a new sphere of economic activity. In particular, it created an increased demand for agricultural labour. Slavery was a way of mobilising an agricultural work force.

This local African slavery was much less harsh and brutal than the slavery practiced by Europeans on, for example, the plantations of the United States, the West Indies, and Brazil. The local slavery has been described by anthropologist M. McCulloch:

[S]laves were housed close to the fresh tracts of land they cleared for their masters. They were considered part of the household of their owner, and enjoyed limited rights. It was not customary to sell them except for a serious offense, such as adultery with the wife of a freeman. Small plots of land were given to them for their own use, and they might retain the proceeds of crops they grew on these plots; by this means it was possible for a slave to become the owner of another slave. Sometimes a slave married into the household of his master and rose to a position of trust; there is an instance of a slave taking charge of a chiefdom during the minority of the heir. Descendants of slaves were often practically indistinguishable from freemen.

Slaves were sometimes sent on errands outside the kingdoms of their masters and returned voluntarily. Speaking specifically of the era around 1700, historian Christopher Fyfe relates that, "Slaves not taken in war were usually criminals. In coastal areas, at least, it was rare for anyone to be sold without being charged with a crime."

Voluntary dependence reminiscent of that described in the early Portuguese documents mentioned at the beginning of this section was still present in the 19th century. It was called pawning; Arthur Abraham describes a typical variety:

A freeman heavily in debt, and facing the threat of the punishment of being sold, would approach a wealthier man or chief with a plea to pay of[f] his debts 'while I sit on your lap'. Or he could give a son or some other dependent of his 'to be for you', the wealthy man or chief. This in effect meant that the person so pawned was automatically reduced to a position of dependence, and if he was never redeemed, he or his children eventually became part of the master's extended family. By this time, the children were practically indistinguishable from the real children of the master, since they grew up regarding one another as brothers.

Some observers consider the term "slave" to be more misleading than informative when describing the local practice. Abraham says that in most cases, "subject, servant, client, serf, pawn, dependent, or retainer" would be more accurate. Domestic slavery was abolished in Sierra Leone in 1928. McCulloch reports that at that time, amongst Sierra Leone's largest present-day ethnolinguistic group, the Mende, who then had about 560,000 people, about 15 per cent of the population (i.e., 84,000 people) were domestic slaves. He also says that "singularly little change followed the 1928 decree; a fair number of slaves returned to their original homes, but the great majority remained in the villages in which their former masters had placed them or their parents."

Export slavery remained a major business in Sierra Leone from the late 15th century to the mid-19th century. According to Fyfe, "it was estimated in 1789 that 74,000 slaves were exported annually from West Africa, about 38,000 by British firms." In 1788, a proslavery European named Matthews estimated the annual total exported from between the Nunez River (110 km north of Sierra Leone) and the Sherbro as 3,000. Participation in the Atlantic slave trade was gradually outlawed by various Western nations; Britain outlawed its participation in 1807, and the United States outlawed its participation in 1808.

== Mane invasions (16th century) ==
The Mane invasions of the mid-16th century had a profound impact on Sierra Leone. The Mane (also called Mani) were members of the Mande language group. A warrior people, well-armed and well-organized, they lived east and somewhat north of present-day Sierra Leone. Sometime in the early 16th century they began moving south. According to some Mane who spoke to a Portuguese writer (Dornelas) in the late 16th century, their travels had begun as a result of the expulsion of their chief from the imperial city of Mandimansa, their homeland.

There are conflicting accounts among historians of how these invasions happened. Some historians place their first arrival at the coast east of Sierra Leone, at least as far as the River Cess and likely farther. They advanced northwest along the coast toward Sierra Leone, conquering as they went. Others contend that they arrived on the coast near Sherbro Island. They incorporated large numbers of the people they conquered into their army, with the result that the rank and file consisted mostly of coastal peoples, while the Mane were its commanding group.

By 1545, the Mane had reached Cape Mount. Their conquest of Sierra Leone occupied the ensuing 15 to 20 years, and resulted in the subjugation of all or nearly all of the indigenous coastal peoples—who were known collectively as the Sapes—as far north as the Scarcies. The present demographics of Sierra Leone is largely a reflection of these two decades. The degree to which the Mane supplanted the original inhabitants varied from place to place. The Temne partly withstood the Mane onslaught, and kept their language, but became ruled by a line of Mane kings. The present-day Loko and Mende are the result of a more complete submersion of the original culture: their languages are similar, and both essentially Mande. This is likely due to conquest by the Mane invaders.

=== Aftermath ===
The Mane invasions militarised Sierra Leone. The Sapes had been un-warlike, but after the invasions, right until the late 19th century, bows, shields, and knives of the Mane type had become ubiquitous in Sierra Leone, as had the Mane battle technique of using squadrons of archers fighting in formation, carrying the large-style shields. Villages became fortified. The usual method of erecting two or three concentric palisades, each 4–7 metres (12–20 ft) high, created a formidable obstacle to attackers—especially since, as some of the English observed in the 19th century, the thigh-thick logs planted into the earth to make the palisades often took root at the bottom and grew foliage at the top, so that the defenders occupied a living wall of wood. A British officer who observed one of these fortifications around the time of the Hut Tax War of 1898 ended his description of it thus:

No one who has not seen these fences can realize the immense strength of them. The outer fence at Hahu I measured in several places, and found it to be from 2 to 3 feet thick, and most of the logs, or rather trees, of which it was formed, had taken root and were throwing out leaves and shoots.

He also said that English artillery could not penetrate all three fences. At that time, at least among the Mende, "a typical settlement consisted of walled towns and open villages or towns surrounding it."

After the invasions, the Mane sub-chiefs among whom the country had been divided began fighting among themselves. This pattern of activity became permanent: even after the Mane had blended with the indigenous population—a process which was completed in the early 17th century—the various kingdoms in Sierra Leone remained in a fairly continual state of flux and conflict. Rodney believes that a desire to take prisoners to sell as slaves to the Europeans was a major motivation to this fighting, and may even have been a driving force behind the original Mane invasions. Historian Kenneth Little concludes that the principal objective in the local wars, at least among the Mende, was plunder, not the acquisition of territory. Abraham cautions that slave trading should not be exaggerated as a cause: the Africans had their own reasons to fight, with territorial and political ambitions present. Motivations likely changed over time during the 350-year period.

The wars themselves were not exceptionally deadly. Set-piece battles were rare, and the fortified towns so strong that their capture was seldom attempted. Often the fighting consisted of small ambushes.

In these years, the political system was such that each large village along with its satellite villages and settlements would be headed by a chief. The chief would have a private army of warriors. Sometimes several chiefs would group themselves into a confederacy, acknowledging one of themselves as king (or high chief). Each paid the king fealty. If one were attacked, the king would come to his aid, and the king could adjudicate local disputes.

Despite their many political divisions, the people of the country were united by cultural similarity. One component of this was the Poro, an organisation common to many different kingdoms and ethnolinguistic groups. The Mende claim to be its originators, and there is nothing to contradict this. Possibly they imported it. The Temne claim to have imported it from the Sherbro or Bulom. The Dutch geographer Olfert Dapper knew of it in the 17th century. It is often described as a "secret society", and this is partly true: its rites are closed to non-members, and what happens in the "Poro bush" is never disclosed. However, its membership is very broad: among the Mende, almost all men, and some women, are initiates. In recent years it has not (as far as is known) had a central organisation: autonomous chapters exist for each chiefdom or village. However, it is said that in pre-Protectorate days there was a "Grand Poro" with cross-chiefdom powers of making war and peace. It is widely agreed that it has a restraining influence on the powers of the chiefs. Headed by a fearsome principal spirit, the Gbeni, it plays a major role in the rite of passage of males from puberty to manhood. It imparts some education. In some areas, it had supervisory powers over trade, and the banking system, which used iron bars as a medium of exchange. It is not the only important society in Sierra Leone: the Sande is a female-only analogue of it; there is also the Humoi, which regulates sex, and the Njayei and the Wunde. The Kpa is a healing-arts collegium.

Besides the political impact, there were economic effects as well: trade with the interior was interrupted, and thousands were sold as slaves to the Europeans. In industry, a flourishing tradition in fine ivory carving was ended; however, improved ironworking techniques were introduced.

== 1600–1787 ==
By the 17th century, Portuguese colonialism in West Africa began to wane, and in Sierra Leone other European colonial powers such as the English and Dutch began to supplant their influence in the region. In 1628, a group of English merchants had established a factory in the vicinity of Sherbro Island, about 50 km (30 mi) south-east from present-day Freetown. In addition to ivory and slaves, the merchants at the factory also traded in camwood, a type of hard timber. The Portuguese missionary Baltasar Barreira ministered in Sierra Leone until 1610. Jesuits, and later in the century, Capuchins, continued the mission. By 1700, it had closed, although priests occasionally visited.

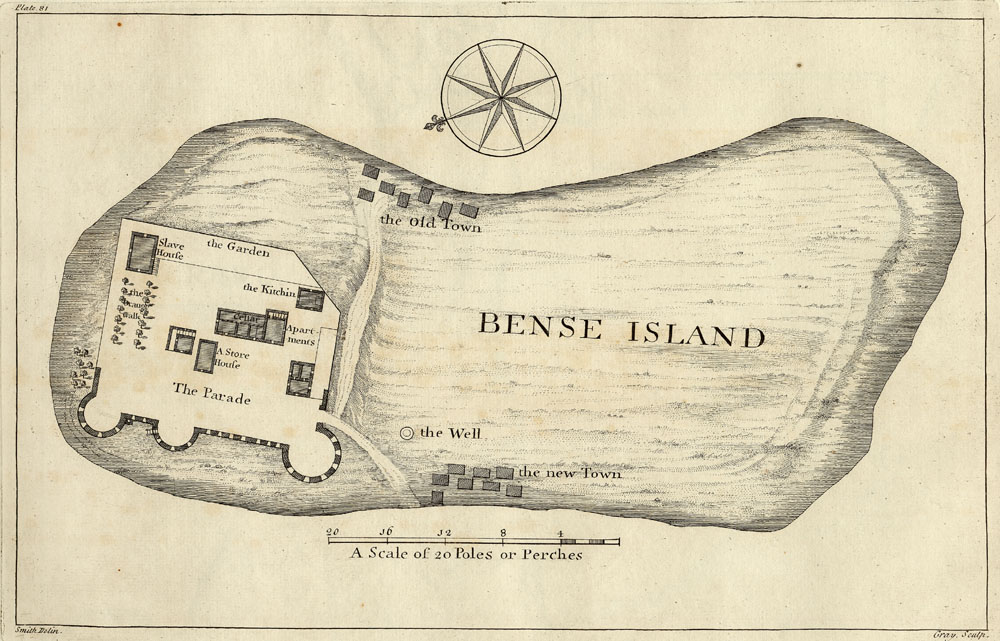
Map of Bunce Island from 1727

In 1663, the Royal African Company (RAC) was granted a royal charter from Charles II of England and soon established a factory on Sherbro Island and Tasso Island. During the Second Anglo-Dutch War, both factories were sacked by a Dutch Navy force in 1664. The factory was rebuilt, though it was sacked again by the French Navy during the War of the Spanish Succession in 1704 and pirates in 1719 and 1720. After the Dutch raid on the RAC factory at Tasso Island, it was relocated to the nearby Bunce Island, which was more defensible.

The Europeans made payments, called Cole, for rent, tribute, and trading rights, to the king of an area. At this time the local military advantage was still on the side of the Africans, and there is a 1714 report of a king seizing RAC goods in retaliation for a breach of protocol. Local Afro-Portuguese merchants often acted as middlemen, the Europeans advancing them goods to trade to the local people, most often for ivory. In 1728, an overly aggressive RAC governor united the Africans and Afro-Portuguese in hostility to him; they burnt down the Bunce Island fort and it was not rebuilt until about 1750. During the time that the Royal African Company was operating, the firm of Grant, Sargent and Oswald provisioned the trading stations. When the RAC abandoned Bunce Island, Sargent and his partners purchased its factory in 1748, repaired it, and used it to trade in timber. They expanded to Batts, Bobs, Tasso, and Tumbu Islands and along the banks of the river, eventually becoming involved in the slave trade. The French sacked it again in 1779, during the American Revolutionary War.

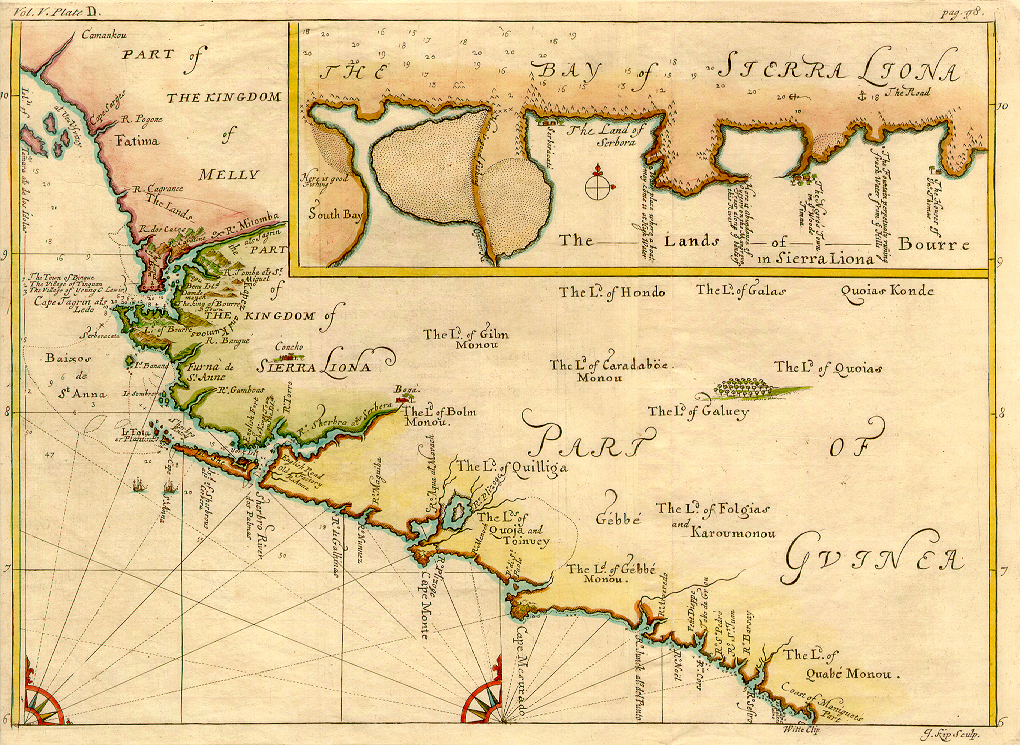
Map of Sierra Leone from 1732

During the 17th century the Temne ethnolinguistic group was expanding. Around 1600, a Mani still ruled the Loko kingdom (the area north of Port Loko Creek) and another ruled the upper part of the south shore of the Freetown estuary. The north shore of the estuary was under a Ballom king, and the area just east of Freetown on the peninsula was held by a non-Mani with a European name, Dom Phillip de Leon (who may have been a subordinate to his Mani neighbour). By the mid-17th century this situation had changed: Temne, not Bullom was spoken on the south shore, and ships stopping for water and firewood had to pay customs to the Temne king of Bureh who lived at Bagos town on the point between the Rokel River and Port Loko Creek. (The king may have considered himself a Mani—to this day, Temne chiefs have Mani-derived titles—but his people were Temne. The Bureh king in place in 1690 was called Bai Tura, Bai being a Mani form.) The Temne had thus expanded in a wedge toward the sea at Freetown, and now separated the Bulom to the north from the Mani and other Mande-speakers to the south and east.

In this period there are several reports of women occupying high positions. The king of the south shore used to leave one of his wives to rule when he was absent, and in the Sherbro there were female chiefs. In the early 18th century, a Bulom named Seniora Maria had her own town near Cape Sierra Leone.

During the 17th century, Muslim Fula from the Upper Niger and Senegal rivers moved into an area called Fouta Djallon (or Futa Jalon) in the mountainous region north of present-day Sierra Leone. They were to have an important impact on the peoples of Sierra Leone because they increased trade and also produced secondary population movements into Sierra Leone. Though the Muslim Fula first cohabited peaceably with the peoples already at Fouta Djallon, around 1725 they embarked on a war of domination, forcing the migration of many Susu, Yalunka, and non-Muslim Fula.

Susu—some already converted to Islam—came south into Sierra Leone, in turn displacing Limba from north-west Sierra Leone and driving them into north-central Sierra Leone where they continue to live. Some Susu moved as far south as the Temne town of Port Loko, only 60 km (37 mi) upriver from the Atlantic. Eventually a Muslim Susu family called Senko supplanted the town's Temne rulers. Other Susu moved westward from Fouta Djallon, eventually dominating the Baga, Bulom, and Temne north of the Scarcies River.

The Yalunka in Fouta Djallon first accepted Islam, then rejected it and were driven out. They went into north-central Sierra Leone and founded their capital at Falaba in the mountains near the source of the Rokel. It is still an important town, about 20 km (12 mi) south of the Guinea border. Other Yalunka went somewhat farther south and settled among the Koranko, Kissi, and Limba.

Besides these groups, who were more-or-less unwilling emigrants, a considerable variety of Muslim adventurers went forth from Fouta Djallon. A Fula called Fula Mansa (mansa meaning king) became ruler of the Yoni country 100 km (62 mi) east of present-day Freetown. Some of his Temne subjects fled south to the Banta country between the middle reaches of the Bagu and Jong rivers, where they became known as the Mabanta Temne.

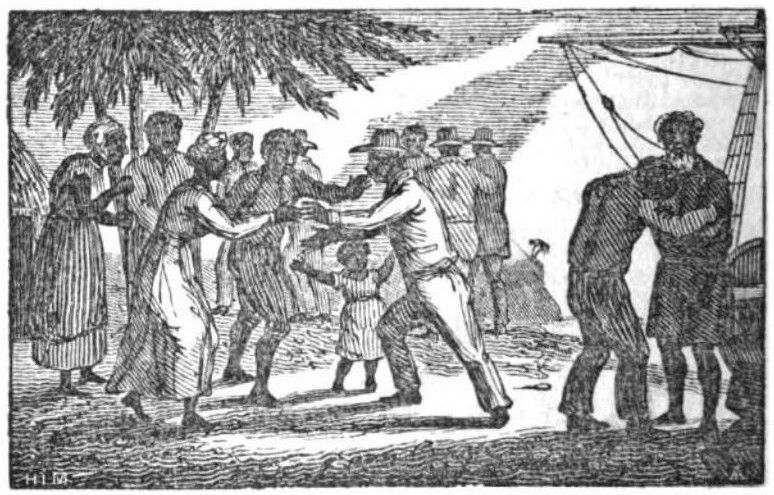
An 1835 illustration of liberated slaves arriving in Sierra Leone

In 1652, the first slaves from Sierra Leone were transported to North America; they were sold to white plantation owners in the Sea Islands off the coast of the American South. During the 18th century, numerous slaves from Bunce Island were transported to the Southern Colonies, due in part to the business relationship between American slave trader Henry Laurens and the London-based firm of Grant, Sargent, Oswald & Company, which oversaw a thriving slave trade from Bunce Island in Sierra Leone to North America.

The transatlantic slave trade continued to transport millions of enslaved Africans, including those from Sierra Leone, across the Atlantic during the 17th, 18th and 19th centuries; ultimately, roughly 12.5 million slaves where brought to the Americas this way. However, the rise of abolitionist movements in the Western world in the late 18th and early 19th centuries led to various European and American governments passing legislation to abolish the slave trade. The slave trade in Sierra Leone underwent a marked decline during the 19th century, though domestic slavery would persist until the 20th century.

== The Province of Freedom (1787–1789) ==
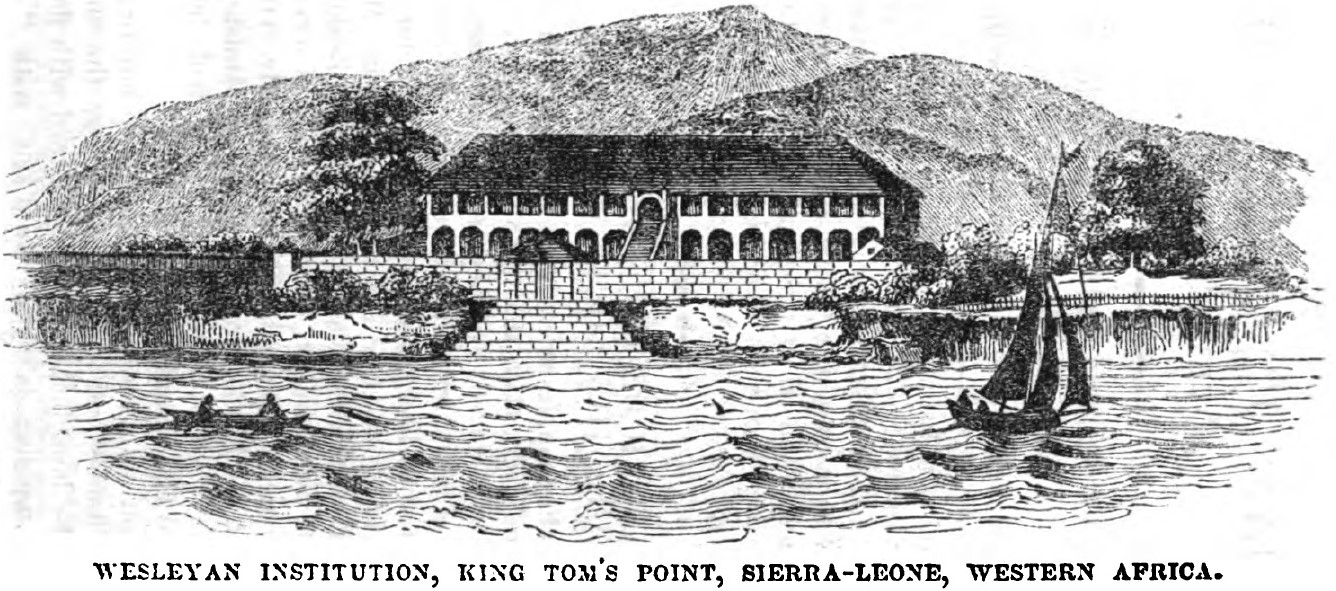
Wesleyan Institution, King Tom's Point, Sierra Leone, 1846

=== Conception of the Province of Freedom (1787) ===
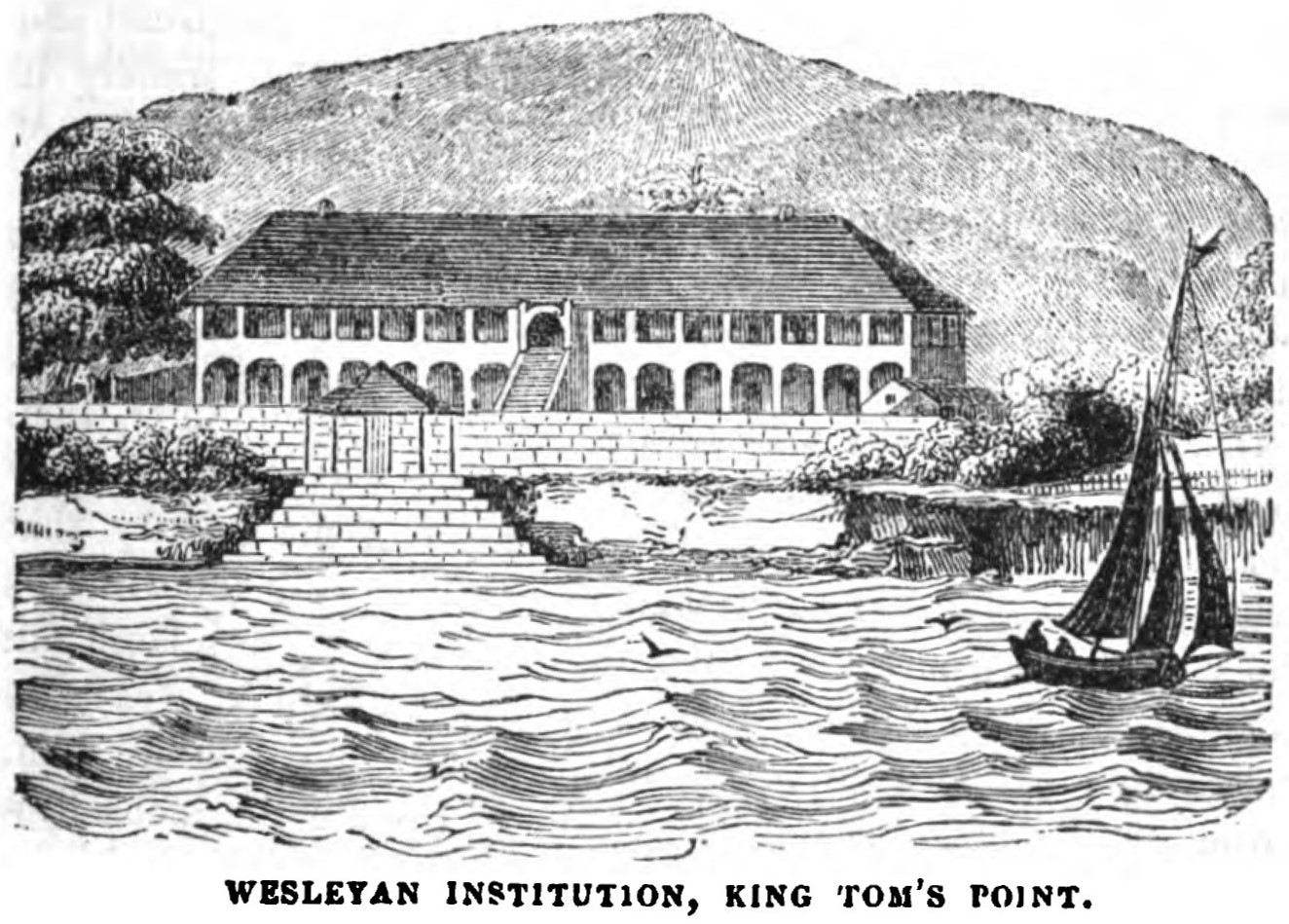
Wesleyan Institution, King Tom's Point (May 1853, X, p.57)

In 1787, a plan was established to settle some of London's "Black Poor" in Sierra Leone in what was called the "Province of Freedom". This was organised by the Committee for the Relief of the Black Poor, founded by British abolitionist Granville Sharp, which preferred it as a solution to continuing to financially support them in London. Many of the Black Poor were African Americans, who had been given their freedom after seeking refuge with the British Army during the American Revolution, but also included other West Indian, African and Asian inhabitants of London.

The Sierra Leone Resettlement Scheme was proposed by entomologist Henry Smeathman and drew interest from humanitarians such as Granville Sharp, who saw it as a means of showing the pro-slavery lobby that black people could contribute towards the running of the new colony of Sierra Leone. Government officials soon became involved in the scheme as well, although their interest was spurred by the possibility of resettling a large group of poor citizens elsewhere. William Pitt the Younger, prime minister and leader of the Tory party, had an active interest in the Scheme, because he saw it as a means to repatriate the Black Poor to Africa, since "it was necessary they should be sent somewhere, and be no longer suffered to infest the streets of London".

=== Establishment, destruction and re-establishment (1789) ===
The area was first settled by 400 formerly enslaved Black Britons, who arrived off the coast of Sierra Leone on 15 May 1787, accompanied by some English tradesmen. They established the Province of Freedom or Granville Town on land purchased from local Koya Temne subchief King Tom and regent Naimbanna II, a purchase which the Europeans understood to cede the land to the new settlers "for ever". The established arrangement between Europeans and the Koya Temne did not include provisions for permanent settlement, and some historians question how well the Koya leaders understood the agreement. Half of the settlers in the new colony died within the first year. Several black settlers started working for local slave traders. The settlers that remained forcibly captured land from a local African chieftain, but he retaliated, attacking the settlement, which was reduced to a mere 64 settlers comprising 39 black men, 19 black women, and six white women. Black settlers were captured by unscrupulous traders and sold as slaves, and the remaining colonists were forced to arm themselves for their own protection. King Tom's successor King Jemmy attacked and burned the colony in 1789.

Alexander Falconbridge was sent to Sierra Leone in 1791 to collect the remaining Black Poor settlers, and they re-established Granville Town (later renamed Cline Town) near Fourah Bay. Although these 1787 settlers did not establish Freetown, which was founded in 1792, the bicentennial of Freetown was celebrated in 1987.

After establishing Granville Town, disease and hostility from the indigenous people eliminated the first group of colonists and destroyed their settlement. A second Granville Town was established by 64 remaining black and white 'Old settlers' under the leadership of St. George Bay Company leader, Alexander Falconbridge and the St. George Bay Company. This settlement was different from the Freetown settlement and colony founded in 1792 by Lt. John Clarkson and the Nova Scotian Settlers under the auspices of the Sierra Leone Company.

== Freetown Colony (1792–1808) ==
=== Conception of the Freetown settlement (1791) ===
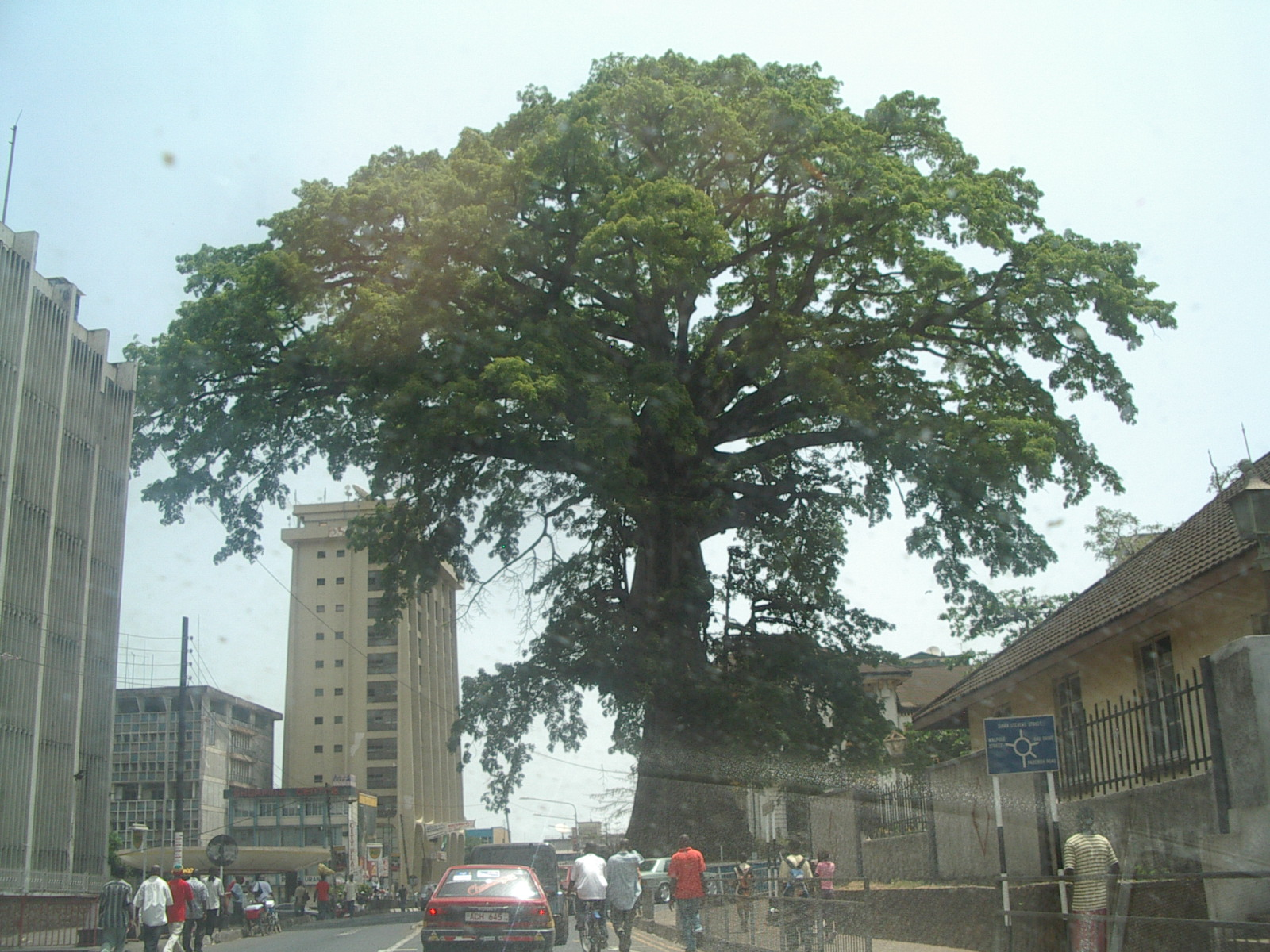
Street-level view of Freetown and the Cotton Tree where former American slaves prayed under and christened Freetown in 1792

The basis for the Freetown Colony began in 1791 with Thomas Peters, an African American who had served in the Black Pioneers and settled in Nova Scotia as part of the Black Loyalist migration. Peters travelled to England in 1791 to report grievances of the Black Loyalists who had been given poor land and faced discrimination. Peters met with British abolitionists and the directors of the Sierra Leone Company. He learned of the company's plan for a new settlement at Sierra Leone. The directors were eager to allow the Nova Scotians to build a settlement there; the London-based and newly created Company had decided to create a new colony but before Peters' arrival had no colonists. Lieutenant John Clarkson was sent to Nova Scotia to register immigrants to take to Sierra Leone for the purpose of starting a new settlement. Clarkson worked with Peters to recruit 1,196 former American slaves from free African communities around Nova Scotia such as Birchtown. Most had escaped Virginia and South Carolina plantations. Some had been born in Africa before being enslaved and taken to America.

=== Settlement by Nova Scotians (1792) ===
The settlers sailed in 15 ships from Halifax, Nova Scotia and arrived in St. George Bay between 26 February and 9 March 1792. Sixty-four settlers died en route to Sierra Leone, and even Lieutenant Clarkson was ill during the voyage. Upon reaching Sierra Leone, Clarkson and some of the Nova Scotian 'captains' "despatched on shore to clear or make roadway for their landing". The Nova Scotians were to build Freetown on the former site of the first Granville Town which had become a "jungle" since its destruction in 1789. (Though they built Freetown on Granville Town's former site, their settlement was not a rebirth of Granville Town, which had been re-established at Fourah Bay in 1791 by the remaining Old Settlers.) Clarkson told the men to clear the land until they reached a large cotton tree. After this difficult work had been done and the land cleared, all the settlers, men and women, disembarked and marched towards the thick forest and to the cotton tree, and their preachers (all African Americans) began singing:

Awake and Sing Of Moses and the Lamb
Wake! every heart and every tongue'
To praise the Saviour's name
The day of Jubilee is come;
Return ye ransomed sinners home

On 11 March 1792, Nathaniel Gilbert, a white preacher, prayed and preached a sermon under the large Cotton Tree, and Reverend David George preached the first recorded Baptist service in Africa. The land was dedicated and christened 'Free Town' according to the instructions of the Sierra Leone Company Directors. This was the first thanksgiving service in the newly christened Free Town and was the beginning of the political entity of Sierra Leone. Later, John Clarkson would be sworn in as the first governor of Sierra Leone. Small huts were erected before the rainy season. The Sierra Leone Company surveyors and the settlers built Freetown on the American grid pattern, with parallel streets and wide roads, with the largest being Water Street.

On 24 August 1792, the Black Poor or Old Settlers of the second Granville Town were incorporated into the new Sierra Leone Colony but remained at Granville Town. It survived being pillaged by the French in 1794, and was rebuilt by the Nova Scotian settlers. By 1798, Freetown had 300–400 houses with architecture resembling that of the American South, with 3- to 4-foot stone foundations and wooden superstructures. Eventually this style of housing (brought by the Nova Scotians) would be the model for the 'bod oses' of their Creole descendants.

=== Settlement by Jamaican Maroons (1800) ===
In 1800, the Nova Scotians rebelled and it was the arrival of more than 500 Jamaican Maroons which caused the rebellion to be suppressed. Thirty-four Nova Scotians were banished and sent to either to Sherbro Island or a penal colony at Gore. Some of these were eventually allowed back into Freetown. Following their capture of the rebels, the Maroons were granted the land of the Nova Scotian rebels. Eventually the Jamaican Maroons in Sierra Leone had their own district at the newly named Maroon Town.

The Maroons were a free community of blacks from Cudjoe's Town (Trelawny Town) who had been resettled in Nova Scotia after surrendering to the British government followed the Second Maroon War of 1795–6. They had petitioned the British government for settlement elsewhere due to the climate in Nova Scotia.

=== Abolition and slaves-in-transit (1807 - 1830s) ===
Britain outlawed the slave trade throughout its empire on 29 March 1807 with the Slave Trade Act 1807, though the practice continued in the British Empire until it was finally abolished in the 1830s. The Royal Navy's West Africa Squadron operating from Freetown took active measures to intercept and seize ships participating in the illegal Atlantic slave trade. The slaves that were held on these vessels were released into Freetown and were initially called 'Captured negroes', 'Recaptives' or 'Liberated Africans'.

=== Formation of the Sierra Leone Creole ethnicity (1870 onwards) ===
The Sierra Leone Creole people (Krio: Krio people) are descendants of the Black Poor, freed African Americans (Nova Scotian Black Loyalists), Afro-Caribbeans (Jamaican Maroons), and Liberated Africans who settled in the Western Area of Sierra Leone between 1787 and about 1885. The colony was established by the British, supported by abolitionists, under the Sierra Leone Company as a place for freedmen. The settlers called their new settlement Freetown.

== Colonial era (1808–1961) ==
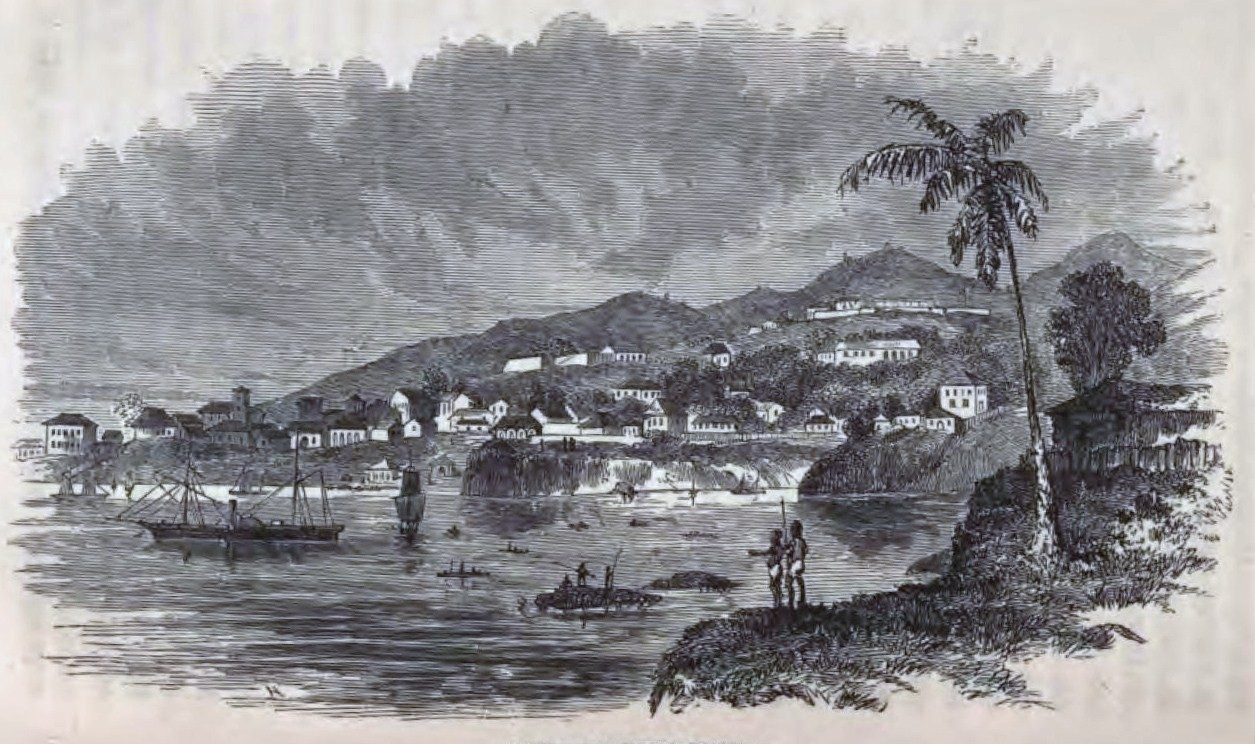
The colony of Freetown in 1856

=== Establishment of the British Crown Colony (1808) ===
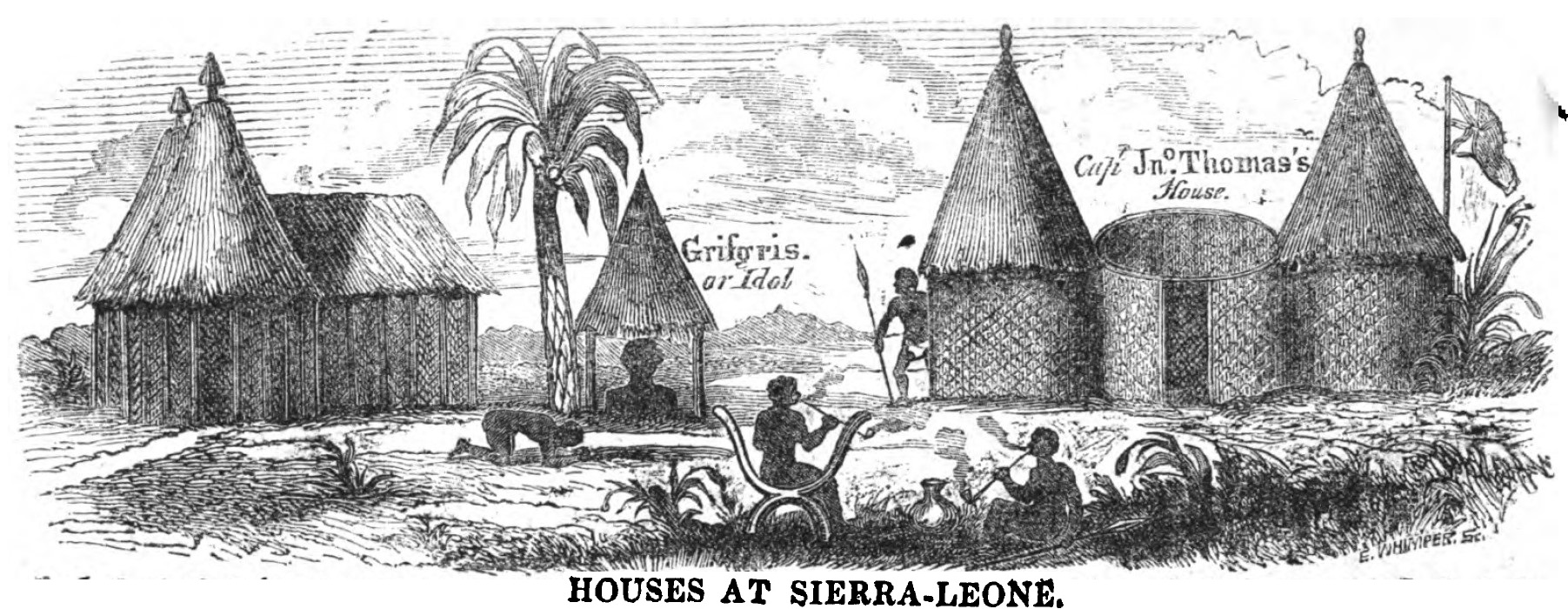
Houses at Sierra Leone (May 1853, X, p.55)

In 1808, the Sierra Leone Colony and Protectorate was founded, with Freetown serving as the capital of British West Africa. The city's population expanded rapidly with freed slaves, who established suburbs on the Freetown Peninsula. They were joined by West Indian and African soldiers who settled in Sierra Leone after fighting for Britain in the Napoleonic Wars.

=== Intervention and acquisition of the hinterland (1800s–1895) ===
In the early 1800s, Sierra Leone was a small colony extending a few kilometres (a few miles) up the peninsula from Freetown. The bulk of the territory that makes up present-day Sierra Leone was still the sovereign territory of indigenous peoples such as the Mende and Temne, and was little affected by the tiny population of the Colony. Over the course of the 19th century, that gradually changed: the British and Creoles in the Freetown area increased their involvement in—and their control over—the surrounding territory by engaging in trade, which was promoted and increased through treaty-making and military expeditions.

In their treaties with the native chiefs, the British were largely concerned with securing local peace so that commerce would not be interrupted. Typically, the British government agreed to pay a chief a stipend in return for a commitment from him to keep the peace with his neighbours; other specific commitments extracted from a chief might include keeping roads open, allowing the British to collect customs duties, and submitting disputes with his neighbours to British adjudication. In the decades following Britain's prohibition of the slave trade in 1807, the treaties sometimes also required chiefs to desist from slave-trading. Suppression of slave-trading and suppression of inter-chiefdom war went hand-in-hand because the trade thrived on the wars (and caused them). Thus, to the commercial reasons for pacification could be added anti-slavery ones.

When friendly persuasion failed to secure their interests, the British were not above (to borrow Carl von Clausewitz's phrase) "continuing diplomacy by other means". At least by the mid-1820s, the army and navy were going out from the Colony to attack chiefs whose behaviour did not conform to British dictates. In 1826, Governor Turner led troops to the Bum–Kittam area, captured two stockaded towns, burnt others, and declared a blockade on the coast as far as Cape Mount. This was partly an anti-slaving exercise and partly to punish the chief for refusing territory to the British. Later that year, acting-Governor Macaulay sent out an expedition which went up the Jong river and burned Commenda, a town belonging to a related chief. In 1829, the colonial authorities founded the Sierra Leone Police Corps. In 1890, this force was divided into the Civilian Police and the Frontier Police.

The British developed a modus operandi which characterised their interventions throughout the century: army or frontier police, with naval support if possible, would bombard a town and then usually torch it after the defenders had fled or been defeated. Where possible, local enemies of the party being attacked were invited by the British to accompany them as allies.

In the 1880s, Britain's intervention in the hinterland received added impetus because of the "Scramble for Africa": an intense competition between the European powers for territory in Africa. In this case, the rival was France. To forestall French incursion into what they had come to consider as their own sphere, the British government renewed efforts to finalise a boundary agreement with France and on 1 January 1890 instructed Governor Hay in Sierra Leone to get from chiefs in the boundary area friendship treaties containing a clause forbidding them to treat with another European power without British consent.

Consequently, in 1890 and 1891 Hay and two travelling commissioners, Garrett and Alldridge, went on extensive tours of what is now Sierra Leone obtaining treaties from chiefs. Most of these were not, however, treaties of cession; they were in the form of cooperative agreements between two sovereign powers.

In January 1895, a boundary agreement was signed in Paris, roughly fixing the line between French Guinea and Sierra Leone. The exact line was to be determined by surveyors. As Christopher Fyfe notes, "The delimitation was made almost entirely in geographical terms—rivers, watersheds, parallels—not political. Samu chiefdom, for instance, was divided; the people on the frontier had to opt for farms on one side or villages on the other."

More generally, the arbitrary lumping-together of disparate native peoples into geographical units decided by the colonial powers has been an ongoing source of trouble throughout Africa. These geographical units are now attempting to function as nations but are not naturally nations, being composed in many cases of peoples who are traditional enemies. In Sierra Leone, for example, the Mende, Temne and Creoles remain as rival power blocs between whom lines of fission easily emerge.

=== Establishment of the British Protectorate and further land acquisition (1895) ===
In August 1895, an Order-in-Council was issued in Britain authorising the Colony to make laws for the territory around it, extending out to the agreed-upon boundary (which corresponds closely to that of present-day Sierra Leone). On 31 August 1896, a Proclamation was issued in the Colony declaring that territory to be a British Protectorate. The Colony remained a distinct political entity; the Protectorate was governed from it.

Most of the chiefs whose territories the Protectorate subsumed did not enter into it voluntarily. Many had signed treaties of friendship with Britain, but these were often expressed as being between sovereign powers, with there was no subordination to the British. Only a handful of chiefs had signed treaties of cession, and in some cases it is unknown if the chiefs had understood the implications of the treaty. In more remote areas, no treaties had been signed at all. The creation of the Sierra Leone Protectorate was more in the nature of a unilateral acquisition of territory by the British.

Almost every chieftaincy in Sierra Leone responded to the British arrogation of power with armed resistance. The Protectorate Ordinances (passed in the Colony in 1896 and 1897) abolished the title of King and replaced it with "Paramount Chief". Chiefs and kings had formerly been selected by the leading members of their own communities; now all chiefs, even paramount ones, could be deposed or installed at the will of the Governor, and most of the judicial powers of the chiefs were removed and given to courts presided-over by British "District Commissioners". The Governor decreed that a house tax of 5s to 10s was to be levied annually on every dwelling in the Protectorate. To the chiefs, these reductions in their power and prestige were unbearable.

During these conflicts, British officers used the practice of cutting the hands of people to account for bullets spent, similar to what had occurred under the regime Leopold II of Belgium in the Congo Free State. British doctor, John Lancelot Todd, who had travelled to West Africa on an LSTM expedition together with Joseph Everett Dutton, wrote down the testimonies of British officers who had been involved in putting down rebellions in British Sierra Leone and had practiced cutting the hands of the people they shot. The exact number of living victims who ended up mutilated is unknown.

=== Hut Tax War of 1898 ===
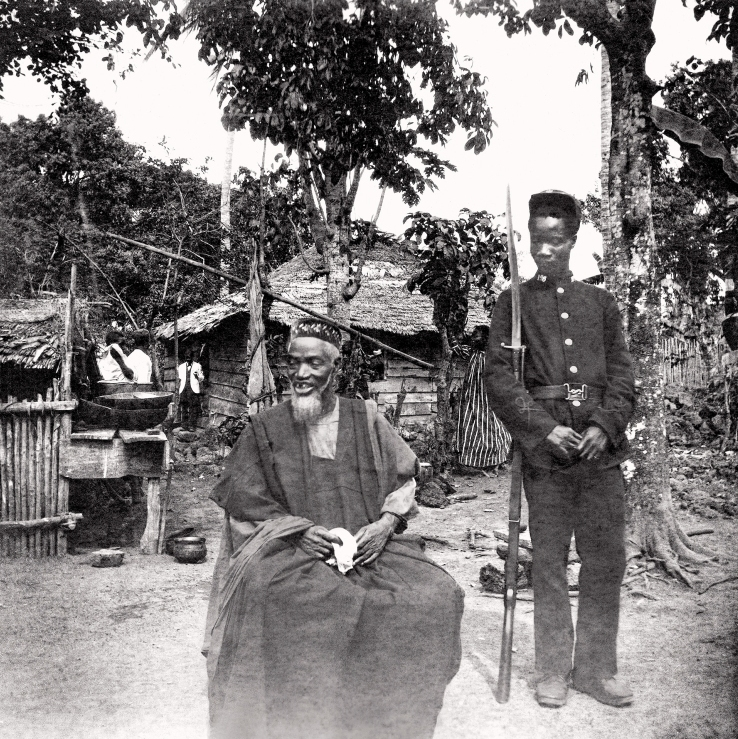
A photograph of Bai Bureh under arrest in 1898

In 1898, two rebellions broke out against British colonial rule in Sierra Leone in response to the introduction of a new hut tax by Governor Frederic Cardew. On 1 January 1898, Cardew introduced the hut tax as a way to pay for the colonial administration's financial expenditures. However, the tax proved to be beyond the financial means of many in the colony, provoking discontent. In February 1898, an attempt by colonial officials to arrest Temne chief Bai Bureh led to him and rebels under his command to revolt against British rule. Bureh's forces launched attacks on British officials and Creole traders.

Despite the ongoing rebellion, Bureh dispatched two peace overtures to the British in April and June of that year, aided by the mediation of Limba chief Almamy Suluku. Cardew rejected both offers, as Bureh would not agree to surrender unconditionally. Bureh's forces conducted a disciplined and skillfully executed guerrilla campaign which caused the British considerable difficulty. Hostilities began in February; Bureh's harassing tactics confounded the British at first but by May they were gaining ground. The rainy season interrupted hostilities until October, when British colonial forces resumed the slow process of capturing rebel stockades. When most of these defences had been eliminated, Bureh was captured or surrendered (accounts differ) in November.

The second revolt in the southeast was a mass uprising, planned somehow to commence everywhere on 27 and 28 April, in which almost all "outsiders"—whether European or Creole—were seized and summarily executed. Although more fearsome than Bai Bureh's rising, it was amorphous, lacked a definite strategy, and was suppressed in most areas within two months. Some Mende rebels in the centre of the country were not beaten until November, however; and Mende king Nyagua's son Maghi, in alliance with some Kissi rebels, continued the revolt in the extreme east of the Protectorate until August 1899. The principal of the uprisings, Bureh, Nyagua and Kpana Lewis, were exiled to the Gold Coast on 30 July 1899. Nine months after the rebellion, the colonial government convicted and executed ninety-six rebels which had been found guilty of murder by hanging. In 1905, Bureh was allowed by the British to return to Sierra Leone, where he continued reassumed his chieftaincy at the settlement of Kasseh.

=== Creole dissent in the high colonial period (1898–1956) ===
Timeline of riot and resistance in the high colonial period

1884, Mechanics Alliance trade union is formed.

1885, Carpenters Defensive Union (trade union) formed.

1893, army barracks workers strike in Freetown; other workers stage sympathy strike. Governor Fleming swears-in 200 special constables to suppress it.

1919. Strike and riot. Railway and Public Works department strikes, in part "on account of the nonpayment of War Bonus gratuities to African workers, although these had been paid to other government employees, especially European personnel." Major riots occur in Freetown. The Creole intelligentsia remain neutral.

1920, Sierra Leone Railway Skilled Workmen Mutual Aid Union formed.

1923–1924. Moyamba riot.

1925. The 1920 union is renamed the Railway Workers' Union.

1926. Strike and riot. Railway Workers' Union strikes 13 January to 26 February. Rioting erupts in Freetown. Creole intelligentsia supports the strikers. According to Wyse this is the first time workers and intelligentsia acted in harmony. The strike was viewed as a threat to stability by the government, and suppressed by troops and police.

1930. Kambia riot.

1930–1931. Haidara Kontorfilli rebellion, named after its charismatic Muslim leader. Wyse gives the causes as "heavy handedness of chiefly rule and the deteriorating social and economic conditions, as well as the erosive nature of colonial rule." Ended after Kontorfilli was killed in a confrontation with Royal West African Frontier Force troops.

1931. Pujehun riot.

1934. Kenema riot.

1938–39. Series of strikes and civil disobedience. WAYL blamed.

1939. Army mutiny. January, led by Creole gunner Emmanuel Cole.

1948. Riot at Baoma Chiefdom of Bo District. One hundred people committed for trial before supreme court for their part in it.

1950, October. African United Mine Workers' Union (Secretary-General was Siaka Stevens) strikes in Marampa and Pepel, Northern Province. Strikers riot and burn the house of the African personnel officer.

1950, 30 October, Kailahun. 5,000 people riot. Cause was a rumour that the Paramount Chief of Luawa Chiefdom would be upheld and reinstated by the government.

1951. Pujehun, South Eastern Province.
3 March: Armed attack at night on chief's house repelled by police.
15 March: Several villages refuse to pay house tax to government unless chief deposed. Intimidation practised on government sympathisers.
2 June: About 300 "rioters" from outlying villages attack the town of Bandejuma. 101 people committed for Supreme Court trial. Others dealt with summarily.

1955, February. Freetown General Strike over rising cost-of-living and low pay. Lasted several days: looting, property damage, including residences of government ministers. Leader: Marcus Grant.

1955–56 riots. From the Northern province district of Kambia to the South-Eastern Pujehun district. "It involved 'many tens of thousands' of peasants and hinterland town dwellers."

In the early 19th century Freetown served as the residence of the British governor who also ruled the Gold Coast (now Ghana) and the Gambia settlements. Sierra Leone also served as the educational centre of British West Africa. Fourah Bay College, established in 1827, rapidly became a magnet for English-speaking Africans on the west coast. For more than a century, it was the only European-style university in western Sub-Saharan Africa.

After the Hut Tax War there was no more large-scale military resistance to colonialism. Resistance and dissent continued, but took other forms. Vocal political dissent came mainly from the Creoles, who had a sizeable middle and upper class of business-people and European-educated professionals such as doctors and lawyers. In the mid-19th century they had enjoyed a period of considerable political influence, but in the late 19th century the government became much less open to them.

They continued to press for political rights, however, and operated a variety of newspapers which governors considered troublesome and demagogic. In 1924, a new constitution was put in place, introducing elected representation (3 out of 22 members) for the first time, with the first elections held on 28 October. Prominent among the Creoles demanding change were the bourgeois nationalist H.C. Bankole-Bright, General Secretary of the Sierra Leone Branch of the National Congress of British West Africa (NCBWA), and the socialist I.T.A. Wallace-Johnson, founder of the West African Youth League (WAYL).

African resistance was not limited to political discussion. Sierra Leone developed an active trade union movement whose strikes were often accompanied by sympathetic rioting among the general population.

Besides the colonial employers, popular hostility was targeted against the tribal chiefs who the British had transformed into functionaries in the colonial system of indirect rule. Their role was to provide policing, collect taxes, and obtain corvée labour (forced labour exacted from those unable to pay taxes) for the colonial government; in return, the government maintained them in a privileged position over the other Africans. Chiefs not willing to play this role were replaced by more compliant ones. According to Kilson, the attitude of the Africans toward their chiefs became ambivalent: frequently they respected the office but resented the exactions made by the individual occupying it. From the chiefs' point of view, the dilemma of an honourable ruler faced with British ultimatums cannot have been easy.

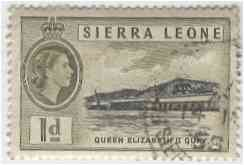
Postage stamp with portrait of Queen Elizabeth II, 1956

Throughout the 20th century, there were numerous riots directed against tribal chiefs. These culminated in the Freetown riot of 1955, which was suppressed by a combined force of police and Royal Sierra Leone Regiment troops. After those riots, reforms were introduced: the forced-labour system was completely abolished and reductions were made in the powers of the chiefs.

Sierra Leone remained divided into a Colony and a Protectorate, with separate and different political systems constitutionally defined for each. Antagonism between the two entities escalated to a heated debate in 1947, when proposals were introduced to provide for a single political system. Most of the proposals came from the Protectorate. The Krio, led by Isaac Wallace-Johnson, opposed the proposals, the main effect of which would have been to diminish their political power. It was due to the astute politics of Sir Milton Margai that the educated Protectorate elite was won over to join forces with the paramount chiefs in the face of Krio intransigence. Later, Margai used the same skills to win-over opposition leaders and moderate Krio elements for the achievement of independence.

In November 1951, Margai oversaw the drafting of a new constitution, which united the separate Colonial and Protectorate legislatures and provided a framework for decolonization. In 1953, Sierra Leone was granted local ministerial powers, and Margai was elected Chief Minister of Sierra Leone. The new constitution ensured Sierra Leone a parliamentary system within the Commonwealth of Nations. In May 1957, Sierra Leone held its first parliamentary election. The Sierra Leone People's Party (SLPP), which was then the most-popular political party in the colony of Sierra Leone, won the most seats in Parliament. Margai was also re-elected as Chief Minister by an overwhelming majority.

=== Sierra Leone in World War II ===
Throughout the war, Freetown served as a critical convoy station for Allied ships.

== 1960 Independence Conference ==
On 20 April 1960, Sir Milton Margai led the Sierra Leonean delegation in the negotiations for independence at the constitutional conferences held with Queen Elizabeth II and British Colonial Secretary Iain Macleod, at Lancaster House in London. All twenty-four members of the Sierra Leonean delegation were prominent and well-respected politicians including Sir Milton's younger brother lawyer Sir Albert Margai, trade unionist Siaka Stevens, SLPP-strongman Lamina Sankoh, Creole activist Isaac Wallace-Johnson, Paramount chief Ella Koblo Gulama, educationist Mohamed Sanusi Mustapha, Dr John Karefa-Smart, Professor Kande Bureh, lawyer Sir Banja Tejan-Sie, former Freetown Mayor Eustace Henry Taylor Cummings, educationist Amadu Wurie, and Creole diplomat Hector Reginald Sylvanus Boltman.

On the conclusion of talks in London, Britain agreed to grant Sierra Leone Independence on 27 April 1961. Stevens was the only delegate who refused to sign Sierra Leone's Declaration of Independence, on the grounds that there had been a secret defence-pact between Sierra Leone and Britain; another point of contention by Stevens was the Sierra Leonean government's position that there would be no elections held before independence which would effectively shut Stevens out of Sierra Leone's political process. Upon their return to Freetown on 4 May 1960, Stevens was promptly expelled from the People's National Party (PNP).

== Opposition to the SLPP government ==
In 1961, Siaka Stevens, a trade unionist and outspoken critic of the SLPP government, took advantage of the dissatisfaction with the ruling SLPP among some prominent politicians from the Northern part of Sierra Leone. He formed an alliance with Sorie Ibrahim Koroma, Christian Alusine-Kamara Taylor, Mohamed.O.Bash-Taqi, Ibrahim Bash-Taqi, S.A.T. Koroma and C.A. Fofana, and formed a new political party called the All People's Congress (APC) in opposition of the SLPP government, using the northern part of Sierra Leone as their political base.

== Early independence (1961–1968) ==
=== Sir Milton Margai administration (1961–1964) ===
On 27 April 1961, Sir Milton Margai led Sierra Leone to Independence from Britain and became the country's first prime minister. Sierra Leone retained a parliamentary system of government and was a member of the Commonwealth of Nations. In May 1962, Sierra Leone held its first general election as an independent nation. The Sierra Leone People's Party (SLPP) won plurality of seats in parliament and Sir Milton Margai was re-elected as prime minister. The years just after independence were prosperous, with money from mineral resources being used for development and the founding of Njala University.

Margai was very popular among Sierra Leoneans during his time in power. An important aspect of his character was his self-effacement; he was neither corrupt nor did he make a lavish display of his power or status. His government was based on the rule of law and the notion of separation of powers, with multiparty political institutions and fairly viable representative structures. Margai used his conservative ideology to lead Sierra Leone without much strife. He appointed government officials with a clear eye to satisfy various ethnic groups. Margai employed a brokerage style of politics by sharing political power between political groups and the paramount chiefs in the provinces.

=== Sir Albert Margai administration (1964–1967) ===
Upon Sir Milton Margai's death in 1964, his half-brother, Sir Albert Margai, was appointed as prime minister by parliament. Sir Albert's leadership was briefly challenged by Sierra Leone's Foreign Minister John Karefa-Smart, who questioned Sir Albert's succession to the SLPP leadership position. Kareefa-Smart received little support in Parliament in his attempt to have Margai stripped of the SLPP leadership. Soon after Margai was sworn in as prime minister, he immediately dismissed several senior government officials who had served under his elder brother's government, as he viewed them as traitors and a threat to his administration.

Unlike his late brother, Sir Milton, Sir Albert Margai proved unpopular and resorted to increasingly authoritarian actions in response to protests, including the enactment of several laws against the opposition All People's Congress (APC) and an unsuccessful attempt to establish a one-party state. Unlike his late brother, Sir Albert was opposed to the colonial legacy of allowing the country's paramount chiefs executive powers, and he was seen as a threat to the existence of the ruling houses across the country—almost all of whom were strong supporters and key allies of the previous administration. In 1967, riots broke out in Freetown against Sir Albert's policies. In response, Margai declared a state of emergency across the country. He was accused of corruption and of a policy of affirmative action in favour of his own Mende ethnic group

Leading up to the 1967 election, Sir Albert took significant action to cement his control of the country. He gave the SLPP control over parliament, and attempted to co-opt the paramount chiefs in order to rig the election in his favor. Upon failing, Margai considered a military or political coup, but recognizing that he would not be able to rely on the full support of the army nor parliament, he chose to back down and give up power voluntarily.

=== Three military coups (1967–1968) ===
The APC narrowly won a small majority of seats in Parliament over the SLPP in a closely contested 1967 Sierra Leone general election, and APC leader Siaka Stevens was sworn in as prime minister on 21 March 1967 in Freetown. Within hours of taking office, Stevens was ousted in a bloodless military coup led by the commander of the army, Brigadier General David Lansana, a close ally of Sir Albert Margai who had appointed Lansana to the position in 1964. Lansana placed Stevens under house arrest in Freetown and insisted the determination of office of the prime minister should await the election of the tribal representatives to the house. On 23 March, a group of senior military officers in the Sierra Leone Army led by Brigadier Andrew Juxon-Smith overrode this action by seizing control of the government, arresting Lansana, and suspending the constitution. The group constituted itself as the National Reformation Council (NRC) with Juxon-Smith as its chairman and Governor-General. On 18 April 1968, a group of senior military officers who called themselves the Anti-Corruption Revolutionary Movement (ACRM) led by Brigadier General John Amadu Bangura overthrew the NRC junta. The ACRM juntas arrested many senior NRC members. The democratic constitution was restored, and power was handed back to Stevens, who assumed the office of prime minister.

== Stevens government and one-party state (1968–1985) ==
Stevens assumed power in 1968 with a great deal of hope and ambition. Much trust was placed upon him as he championed multi-party politics. Stevens had campaigned on a platform of bringing the tribes together under socialist principles. During his first decade or so in power, Stevens renegotiated some of what he called "useless prefinanced schemes" contracted by his predecessors, Albert Margai of the SLPP and Juxon-Smith of the NRC, which were said to have left the country in an economically deprived state. Stevens reorganized the country's refinery, the government-owned Cape Sierra Hotel, and a cement factory. He cancelled Juxon-Smith's construction of a church and mosque on the grounds of Victoria Park. Stevens began efforts that would later bridge the distance between the provinces and the city. Roads and hospitals were constructed in the provinces, and paramount chiefs and provincial peoples became a prominent force in Freetown.

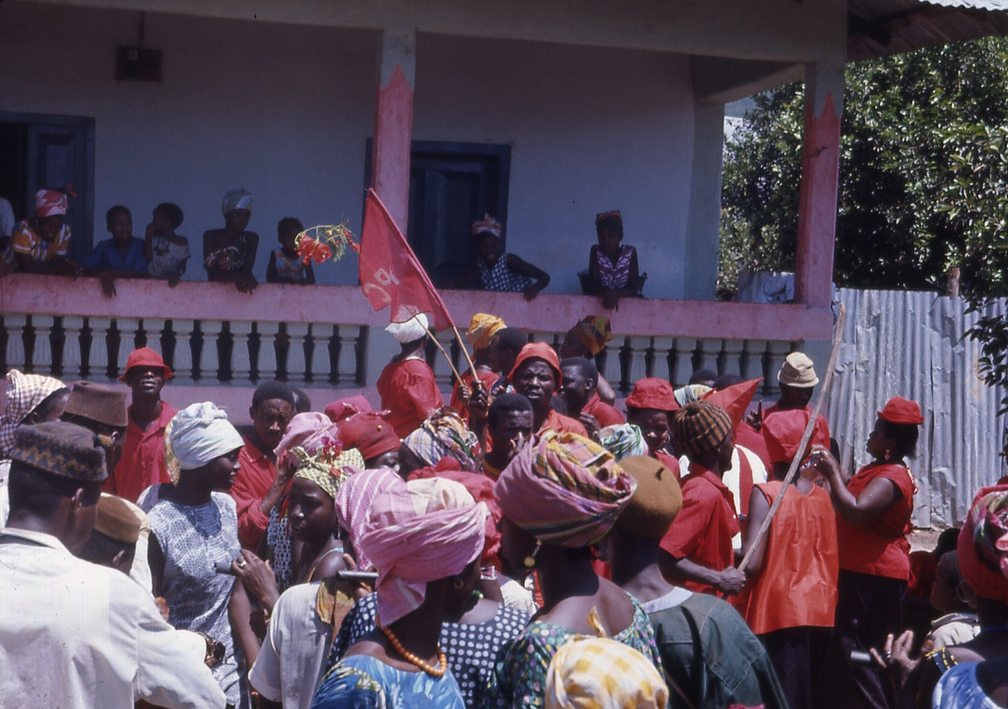
APC political rally in Kabala outside the home of supporters of the rival SLPP, 1968

Under pressure of several coup attempts—real and perceived—Stevens' rule grew more and more authoritarian, and his relationship with some of his ardent supporters deteriorated. He removed the SLPP from competitive politics in general elections, some believed, through the use of violence and intimidation. To maintain the support of the military, Stevens retained the popular John Amadu Bangura as the head of the Sierra Leone Armed Forces.

After the return to civilian rule, by-elections were held (beginning in autumn 1968) and an all-APC cabinet was appointed. Calm was not completely restored. In November 1968, unrest in the provinces led Stevens to declare a state of emergency.

Many senior officers in the Sierra Leone military were greatly disappointed with Stevens' policies, but none could openly confront Stevens. Brigadier General Bangura, who had reinstated Stevens as prime minister, was widely considered the only person who could put the brakes on Stevens. The army was devoted to Bangura and it was believed, in some quarters, that this made him potentially dangerous to Stevens. In September 1970, Stevens declared another state of emergency in response to a perceived military plot against him.

On 23 March 1971, Brigadier John Amadu Bangura led a coup in Freetown in opposition to the Stevens government, announcing Stevens' deposition on national radio. By the end of the day, the coup attempt had been repulsed. Bangura and other senior officers were arrested and executed shortly afterward for treason. Several soldiers were arrested for their involvement in the mutiny, including Corporal Foday Sankoh who was convicted and jailed for seven years at the Pademba Road Prison. Afterwards, in September 1971, Stevens named a junior officer, Joseph Saidu Momoh, as the deputy force commander; he would take up this post the next month. Momoh was a close ally and very loyal to Stevens.

Stevens was also a close ally of Guinean President Sékou Touré from his time in exile; such were the ties between the two presidents that in June 1970 Toure proposed unifying their countries. Although nothing came of this, a mutual defense treaty was announced in November 1970 and would be signed after the coup attempt. At Stevens' request, Guinean soldiers were stationed in Sierra Leone from 1971 to 1974 to help protect the government.

In April 1971, a new republican constitution was adopted under which Stevens became president. In the 1972 by-elections, the opposition SLPP complained of intimidation and procedural obstruction by the APC and militia. These problems became so severe that the SLPP boycotted the 1973 general election; as a result the APC won 84 of the 85 elected seats.

In the early 1970s, Siaka Stevens formed his own personal force known as the State Security Division (SSD), in order to protect him and to maintain his hold on power. Many of the SSD officers were from the provinces, and were very loyal to Stevens. The SSD was very powerful and operated independently under Stevens' direct command. The SSD officers guided Stevens and were deployed across Sierra Leone to put down any rebellion or demonstration against the Stevens government.

An alleged plot to overthrow President Stevens failed in 1974. On 19 July 1975, 14 senior army and government officials including Brigadier David Lansana, former cabinet minister Dr. Mohamed Sorie Forna, former cabinet minister and journalist Ibrahim Bash-Taqi and Lieutenant Habib Lansana Kamara were executed after they were convicted for attempting a coup. In March 1976, Stevens was re-elected president, without opposition.

In 1977, a nationwide student demonstration against the government disrupted Sierra Leone politics. However, the demonstration was quickly put down by the army and SSD officers. A general election was called later that year in which corruption was again endemic. The APC won 74 seats and the SLPP won 15 seats.

In May 1978, the Sierra Leone Parliament, dominated by close allies of President Stevens' APC administration, approved a new constitution, which made the APC the only legally permitted party. Stevens claimed that the new system was more "African" than Western-style democracy. On 12 July 1978, official figures released by the government showed 97 per cent of Sierra Leoneans voted in favour of the one-party state. The SLPP, other opposition parties and civil right groups said the referendum was massively rigged, and that voters were intimidated by security forces loyal to Stevens. Indeed, official figures showed landslide margins for one-party rule even in SLPP strongholds.

With the passage of the new constitution, all other political parties were banned, including the main opposition (the SLPP). This move led to another major demonstration against the government in many parts of the country, which was put down by the army and the SSD officers.

The first elections under the new one-party constitution took place on 1 May 1982. Elections in about two-thirds of the constituencies were contested. Because of irregularities, the government cancelled elections in 13 constituencies. By-elections took place on 4 June 1982. The new cabinet appointed by Stevens after the election included several prominent members of the disbanded SLPP who had defected to the APC, including the new Finance Minister Salia Jusu-Sheriff, a former leader of the SLPP. Jusu-Sheriff's accession to the cabinet was viewed by many as a step toward making the APC a true national party.

Stevens, who had been leader of Sierra Leone for 18 years, retired from that position in November 1985 at the end of his term, although he continued his role as chairman of the ruling APC party. Many in the country had expected Stevens to name his vice president and loyal ally, Sorie Ibrahim Koroma, as his successor. However, at the APC convention in August 1985, the APC named Major General Joseph Saidu Momoh as Stevens' choice to succeed him as president. Momoh was very loyal to Stevens who had appointed him to head of the military fifteen years earlier; Momoh and Stevens were both members of the minority Limba ethnic group. Momoh retired from the military and was elected president without opposition on 1 October 1985. A formal inauguration was held in January 1986, and new parliamentary elections were held in May 1986.

Siaka Stevens is generally criticised for dictatorial methods and government corruption, but he reduced the ethnic polarization in government by incorporating members of various ethnic groups into his all-dominant APC government. Another legacy of Stevens was that for eighteen years while he was in power, he kept the country safe from civil war and armed rebellion.

Despite his dictatorial governing style, Stevens regularly interacted with the people of Sierra Leone by making surprise visits. Stevens also regularly made surprise visits to the poor merchants, where he was often seen buying his own food at a local market with his security team keeping their distance. Stevens often stood and waved to the Sierra Leonean people from an open car when travelling with his convoy.

== Momoh government and RUF rebellion (1985–1991) ==
President Momoh's strong links with the army and his verbal attacks on corruption earned him much-needed initial support among Sierra Leoneans. With the lack of new faces in his cabinet, however, criticisms soon arose that Momoh was simply perpetuating the rule of Stevens. Momoh differed himself by integrating the powerful and independent State Security Force (SSD) into the Sierra Leone Police force.

The first years under the Momoh administration were characterised by corruption, which Momoh defused by sacking several senior cabinet ministers. To formalise his war against corruption, President Momoh announced a "Code of Conduct for Political Leaders and Public Servants". After an alleged attempt to overthrow Momoh in March 1987, more than 60 senior government officials were arrested, including Vice-president Francis Minah, who was removed from office, convicted for plotting the coup, and executed by hanging with five others in 1989.

In October 1990, due to mounting domestic and international pressure for reforms, President Momoh created a commission to review the 1978 one-party constitution. Based on the commission's recommendations, a constitution re-establishing a multi-party system, guaranteeing fundamental human rights and the rule of law, and strengthening democratic structures, was approved by a 60% majority of the APC Parliament, ratified by referendum in September 1991 and became effective on 1 October. There was great suspicion that President Momoh was not serious about his promise of political reform, as APC rule continued to be increasingly marked by abuses of power.

Several senior government officials in Momoh's administration resigned to oppose the APC in upcoming elections. Salia Jusu Sheriff, Abass Bundu, J.B. Dauda and Sama Banya resuscitated the previously disbanded SLPP, while Thaimu Bangura, Edward Kargbo and Desmond Luke formed their own respective political parties to challenge the ruling APC. However, the vast majority of government officials including Victor Bockarie Foh, Edward Turay, Hassan Gbassay Kanu and Osman Foday Yansaneh remained loyal to Momoh and the APC.

Meanwhile, an increasing burden was placed on the country by the rebellion in the eastern part of Sierra Leone.

== Civil war (1991–2002) ==
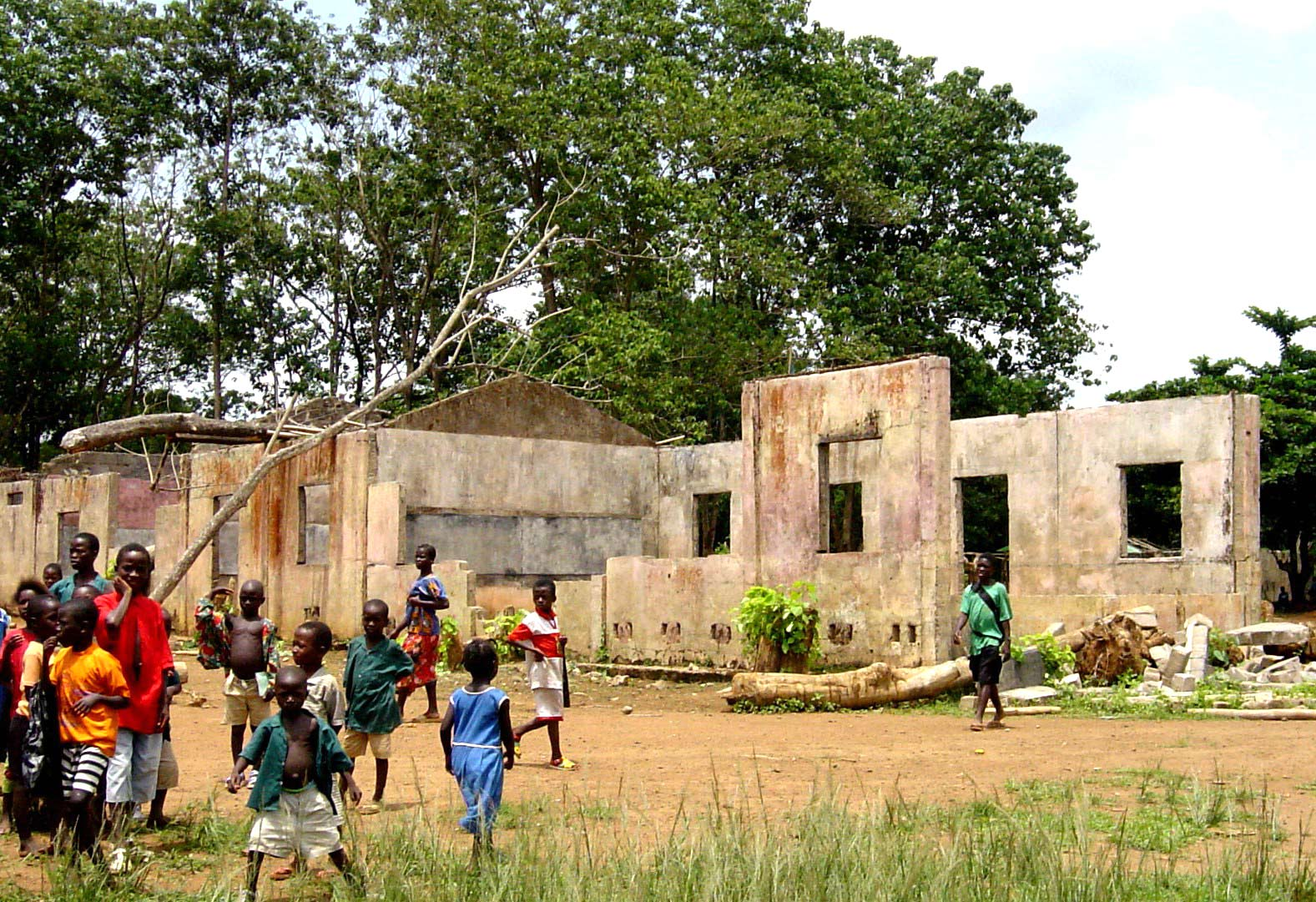
A school in Koindu destroyed during the Civil War. In total 1,270 primary schools were destroyed in the War.

The brutal civil war in neighbouring Liberia played an undeniable role in the outbreak of fighting in Sierra Leone. Charles Taylor—leader of the National Patriotic Front of Liberia—reportedly helped form the Revolutionary United Front (RUF) under the command of former Sierra Leonean army corporal Foday Sankoh, a critic of both the Stevens and Momoh administrations. Sankoh had been an ally of Brigadier General Bangura and was among those who mutinied following Bangura's execution. Sankoh was British-trained and had undergone guerrilla training in Libya. Taylor's aim was for the RUF to attack the bases of Nigerian-dominated peacekeeping troops in Sierra Leone who were opposed to his rebel movement in Liberia. Sankoh's RUF rebels entered the country in March 1991, and within a month controlled much of Eastern Sierra Leone, including the diamond-mining area in Kono District. The government of Sierra Leone, overwhelmed by a crumbling economy and corruption, was unable to mount significant resistance.

At this time, the Momoh government was crumbling. Several senior government officials had resigned to form opposition parties, while there were suspicions that President Momoh was not serious about political reform. Abuses of power had continued and the APC was alleged to have been hoarding arms and planning a violent campaign against the opposition parties ahead of multi-party general elections scheduled for late 1992. The state had been unable to pay civil servants, leading to the looting of government property and a population of aimless youth when schools were closed.

=== NPRC Junta (1992–1996) ===
On 29 April 1992, twenty-five-year-old Captain Valentine Strasser led a group of young Sierra Leone Army officers—including Lieutenant Sahr Sandy, Seargent Solomon Musa, Lieutenant Tom Nyuma, Captain Komba Mondeh, Captain Julius Maada Bio and Captain Komba Kambo—from their barracks in Kailahun District and launched a military coup in Freetown, which sent President Momoh into exile in Guinea. The young soldiers established the National Provisional Ruling Council (NPRC) with Strasser as its chairman and Head of State of the country. Captain Solomon Musa, a close friend of Strasser and one of the leaders of the coup, became the deputy leader of the NPRC Junta. The coup was largely popular because it promised to bring peace, but the NPRC Junta immediately suspended the constitution, banned all political parties, limited freedom of speech and freedom of the press and enacted a rule-by-decree policy, in which soldiers were granted unlimited powers of administrative detention without charge or trial. The NPRC established a Supreme Council, consisting of the highest-ranking soldiers in the Junta government.

On the same day the NPRC Junta took power, one of the coup leaders, Lieutenant Sahr Sandy, was assassinated—reportedly by Major Sim Turay, the head of Sierra Leone Military Intelligence, and a close ally of the deposed president. A heavily armed military manhunt took place across Sierra Leone to find Turay and others suspected to have participated in the assassination, forcing Turay to flee to Guinea.

The NPRC Junta fought the RUF rebels, recaptured most of the RUF-held territories, and pushed the rebels back to the border with Liberia. The NPRC Junta maintained relations with the Economic Community of West African States (ECOWAS) and strengthened support for Sierra Leone–based ECOWAS Monitoring Group (ECOMOG) troops fighting in Liberia.

In December 1992, an alleged coup attempt against the NPRC administration of Strasser was foiled; it had aimed at freeing from detention Colonel Yahya Kanu, Lt-Colonel Kahota M.S. Dumbuya and former inspector-general of police Bambay Kamara. Seargent Mohamed Lamin Bangura and some junior army officers were identified as being behind the coup. Seventeen soldiers were executed, including Bangura, Kanu and Dumbuya. Several prominent members of the Momoh government who had been in detention at the Pa Demba Road prison, including former inspector-general of police Bambay Kamara were also executed.

On 5 July 1994, deputy NPRC leader Solomon Musa was arrested and sent into exile in Guinea. Musa was accused by Strasser, on the advice of high-ranking NPRC soldiers, that he had become too powerful and was a threat to Strasser. Musa, who was a close ally and childhood friend of Strasser, denied the allegation and claimed his accusers were the threat. Strasser replaced Musa as deputy NPRC chairman with Captain Julius Maada Bio, and immediately promoted him to brigadier.

Due to internal divisions between soldiers loyal to Musa and those who supported Strasser's decision to oust him, the NPRC's campaign against the RUF became ineffectual. More and more of the country fell to RUF fighters, and by 1994 the RUF held much of the diamond-rich Eastern Province and were at the edge of Freetown. In response, the NPRC hired several hundred mercenaries from the private firm Executive Outcomes. Within a month, they had driven RUF fighters back to enclaves along Sierra Leone's borders and cleared the RUF from the Kono diamond-producing areas of Sierra Leone.

On 16 January 1996, after about four years in power, Strasser was arrested by his own bodyguards in a coup led by Bio and backed by many high-ranking soldiers of the NPRC junta. Strasser was immediately flown into exile in Conakry, Guinea. Bio stated in a public broadcast that his support for returning Sierra Leone to a democratically elected civilian government and his commitment to ending the civil war were his motivations for the coup.

=== Return to civilian rule and first Kabbah Presidency (1996–1997) ===
Promises of a return to civilian rule were fulfilled by Bio, who handed power over to Ahmad Tejan Kabbah of the Sierra Leone People's Party (SLPP), after the conclusion of elections in early 1996. President Kabbah took power with a great promise of ending the civil war, opened dialogues with the then-defeated RUF and invited RUF-leader Sankoh for peace negotiations, signing the Abidjan Peace Accord on 30 November 1996.

In January 1997, under international pressure, the Kabbah government ended their contract with Executive Outcomes even though a neutral monitoring force had not arrived. This created an opportunity for the RUF to regroup and renew military attacks. Sankoh was arrested in Nigeria, and by the end of March 1997 the peace accord had collapsed.

=== AFRC junta (1997–1998) ===
On 25 May 1997, a group of seventeen soldiers in the Sierra Leone army led by Corporal Tamba Gborie freed and armed 600 prisoners from the Pademba Road Prison in Freetown. One of the prisoners, Major General Johnny Paul Koroma, emerged as the leader of the group. Calling itself the Armed Forces Revolutionary Council (AFRC), the group launched a military coup and sent President Kabbah into exile in Guinea. Koroma became head of state, with Gborie as deputy-in-command of the AFRC. Koroma suspended the constitution, banned demonstrations, closed all private radio stations, and granted unlimited powers to soldiers.

Koroma invited the RUF rebels to join his coup. Facing little resistance from army loyalists, five thousand rag-tag rebel fighters overran the capital. Koroma appealed to Nigeria for the release of Foday Sankoh, appointing the absent leader to the position of deputy chairman of the AFRC. The joint AFRC/RUF coalition government then proclaimed the war had been won, and gave the soldiers and rebels unlimited powers in a great wave of looting and reprisals against civilians in Freetown (dubbed "Operation Pay Yourself" by some of its participants).

The AFRC Junta government was not recognized by any country—whereas President Kabbah's government in exile in Conakry, Guinea was recognized by the United Nations, the African Union, the United States, the United Kingdom and ECOWAS as the legitimate government of Sierra Leone.

The Kamajors, a group of traditional fighters mostly from the Mende ethnic group under the command of Deputy Defence Minister Samuel Hinga Norman, remained loyal to President Kabbah and defended the Southern part Sierra Leone from the rebels. The Kamajors and rebels, including the RUF soldiers, regularly fought each other, and human rights violations were committed by both sides.

ECOWAS, led by Nigerian Head of State Sani Abacha, created a military force to defeat the AFRC/RUF junta in Freetown and to reinstate President Kabbah's government. Many West-African countries sent troops to reinstate the Kabbah Government, assembling a force largely from Nigeria but also including soldiers from Guinea, Ghana, Togo, Gambia, Mali, Ivory Coast and Senegal.

After 10 months in office, the AFRC junta government was ousted and driven out of Freetown by the Nigeria-led ECOMOG forces. The democratically elected government of President Kabbah was reinstated in March 1998. Koroma fled to the rebel strongholds in the east of the country.

=== President Kabbah's return and the end of civil war (1998–2001) ===
Kabbah returned to power with Albert Joe Demby as vice-president. President Kabbah named Solomon Berewa as attorney general and Sama Banya as foreign minister. On 31 July 1998, President Kabbah disbanded the Sierra Leone military and introduced a proposal for a new military. On 12 October 1998, twenty-five soldiers—including Gborie, Brigadier Hassan Karim Conteh, Colonel Samuel Francis Koroma, Major Kula Samba and Colonel Abdul Karim Sesay—were executed by firing squad after they were convicted by court martial for orchestrating the 1997 coup. AFRC leader Johnny Paul Koroma was tried in absentia and sentenced to death.

ECOMOG was unable to achieve a tactical victory over the RUF, and the international community promoted peace negotiations. The Lomé Peace Accord was signed on 7 July 1999 to end the civil war, granting amnesty for all combatants, and controversially granting Sankoh the position of vice president and chairman of the commission that oversaw the diamond mines. In October 1999, the United Nations established the UNAMSIL peacekeeping force to help restore order and disarm the rebels. The first of the 6,000-member force began arriving in December, and the UN Security Council voted in February 2000 to increase the force to 11,000, and later to 13,000. In May, when nearly all Nigerian forces had left and UN forces were trying to disarm the RUF in eastern Sierra Leone, the RUF took more than 500 peacekeepers hostage, some of the rebels using captured weapons and armoured personnel carriers to advance on the capital. The 75-day hostage crisis resulted in more fighting between the RUF and government forces as UN troops launched Operation Khukri to end the siege. The Operation was successful with Indian and British Special Forces being the main contingents.

The situation in the country deteriorated to such an extent that British troops were deployed in Operation Palliser, originally simply to evacuate foreign nationals. However, the British exceeded their original mandate, and took full military action to finally defeat the rebels and restore order. The British were the catalyst for the cease-fire that ended the civil war. Elements of the British Army, together with administrators and politicians, remained in Sierra Leone, helping to train the new armed forces, improve the infrastructure of the country and administer financial and material aid. Tony Blair, the prime minister of Britain at the time of the British intervention, is regarded as a hero by the people of Sierra Leone, many of whom are keen for more British involvement. Sierra Leoneans have been described as "The World's Most Resilient People". In 2004, Parliament passed a Local Government Act of 2004 which re-introduced local government councils back to Sierra Leone after thirty years. On 4 August 2006, in a broadcast to the nation, President Kabbah announced that 2007 presidential and parliamentary elections would be held on 28 July 2007.

Between 1991 and 2001, about 50,000 people were killed in Sierra Leone's civil war. Hundreds of thousands of people were forced from their homes and many became refugees in Guinea and Liberia. In 2001, UN forces moved into rebel-held areas and began to disarm rebel soldiers. By January 2002, President Kabbah declared the civil war officially over. In May 2002, Kabbah was re-elected president by an overwhelming majority. By 2004, the disarmament process was complete. Also in 2004, a UN-backed war crimes court began holding trials of senior leaders from both sides of the war. In December 2005, UN peacekeeping forces departed from Sierra Leone.

== 2002 to present ==
=== Kabbah re-elected (2002–2007) ===
Elections were held in May 2002. President Kabbah was re-elected, and the SLPP won a majority of the parliamentary seats. In June 2003, the UN ban on the sale of Sierra Leone diamonds expired and was not renewed. The UN disarmament and rehabilitation program for Sierra Leone's fighters was completed in February 2004, by which time more than 70,000 former-combatants had been helped. UN forces returned primary responsibility for security in the area around the capital to Sierra Leone's police and armed forces in September 2004; it was the last part of the country to be turned over. Some UN peacekeepers remained to assist the Sierra Leone government until the end of 2005.

The 1999 Lomé Accord called for the establishment of a Truth and Reconciliation Commission, which would provide a forum for both victims and perpetrators of human rights violations during the conflict to tell their stories and facilitate genuine reconciliation. Subsequently, the Sierra Leonean Government and the UN agreed to establish the Special Court for Sierra Leone to try those who "bear the greatest responsibility for the commission of crimes against humanity, war crimes and serious violations of international humanitarian law, as well as crimes under relevant Sierra Leonean law within the territory of Sierra Leone since 30 November 1996." Both the Truth and Reconciliation Commission and the Special Court began operating in the summer of 2002. The Truth and Reconciliation Commission released its Final Report to the government in October 2004. In June 2005, the government issued a White Paper on the commission's final report which accepted some but not all of its recommendations. Members of civil society groups dismissed the government's response as too vague and continued to criticize the government for its failure to follow-up on the report's recommendations.

In March 2003, the Special Court for Sierra Leone issued its first indictments. Foday Sankoh, already in custody, was indicted, along with notorious RUF field commander Sam "Mosquito" Bockarie, Johnny Paul Koroma, and Hinga Norman (the Minister of Interior and former head of the Civil Defence Force), among several others. Norman was arrested when the indictments were announced, while Bockarie and Koroma remained in hiding. On 5 May 2003, Bockarie was killed in Liberia, allegedly on orders from President Charles Taylor, who feared Bockarie's testimony before the Special Court. Koroma was also rumoured to have been killed, though his death remains unconfirmed. Two of the accused, Foday Sankoh and Hinga Norman, have died while incarcerated. On 25 March 2006, with the election of Liberian President Ellen Johnson-Sirleaf, Nigerian President Olusegun Obasanjo permitted the transfer of Charles Taylor—who had been living in exile in the Nigerian coastal town of Calobar—to Sierra Leone for prosecution. Two days later, Taylor attempted to flee Nigeria, but he was apprehended by Nigerian authorities and transferred to Freetown under UN guard.

=== Koroma's government (2007–2018) ===
In August 2007, Sierra Leone held presidential and parliamentary elections. They had a good turnout and were initially judged by official observers to be "free, fair and credible". However, no presidential candidate won the 50% plus one vote majority stipulated in the constitution on the first round of voting. A run-off election was held in September 2007, and Ernest Bai Koroma, the candidate of the APC, was elected president and sworn in the same day. In his inauguration address at the national stadium in Freetown, President Koroma promised to fight corruption and the mismanagement of the country's resources.

By 2007, there had been an increase in the number of drug cartels, many from Colombia, using Sierra Leone as a base to ship drugs to Europe. It was feared that this might lead to increased corruption and violence and turn the country, like neighbouring Guinea-Bissau, into a narco state. President Koroma quickly amended the existing legislation against drug trafficking—inherited at independence in 1961—to address the international concerns, increasing punishment for offenders in terms of prohibitive fines, lengthier prison terms, and provision for extradition of offenders wanted elsewhere, including the United States.

In 2008, an aircraft carrying almost 700 kg of cocaine was caught at Freetown's airport and 19 people, including customs officials, were arrested, and the minister for transport was suspended.

In 2014, the country was impacted by the 2014 Ebola virus epidemic in Sierra Leone.

=== Julius Maada Bio presidency (2018-present) ===
In 2018, Sierra Leone held a general election. President Koroma, who had served maximum two terms, was not able to seek re-election. The presidential election, in which neither candidate reached the required threshold of 55%, went to a second round of voting, in which Julius Maada Bio was elected with 51% of the vote against the candidate of ruling All People's Congress (APC). On 4 April 2018, opposition candidate Julius Maada Bio of Sierra Leone People's Party (SLPP), was sworn in as president.

== See also ==
- History of Africa
- History of West Africa
- Chiefdoms of Sierra Leone
- List of colonial heads of Sierra Leone
- List of heads of state of Sierra Leone
- List of heads of government of Sierra Leone
- President of Sierra Leone
- Politics of Sierra Leone
- Freetown history and timeline
