= 1992 Sierra Leonean coup d'état =

Coup d'état against the government of Sierra Leone

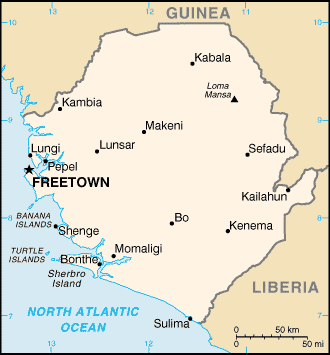
- Map of Sierra Leone.
Date	29 April 1992
Location	Sierra Leone
Result	Coup attempt succeeds.: Joseph Saidu Momoh is overthrown.; National Provisional Ruling Council (NPRC) is established; Civil War intensifies

Belligerents
Government of Sierra Leone	Military faction

Commanders and leaders
Joseph Saidu Momoh; Yahya Kanu (unclear)	Valentine Strasser; Sahr Sandy; Solomon Musa; Tom Nyuma; Komba Mondeh; Julius Maada Bio; Komba Kambo

The 1992 Sierra Leonean coup d'état was a coup d'état against the government of Sierra Leone by a group of young military officers led by 25-year-old Captain Valentine Strasser on 29 April 1992. Strasser took control of the government, deposing President Joseph Saidu Momoh.

== Background ==
Sierra Leone had been governed since 1968 by the All People's Congress, which, after a constitutional referendum in 1978 suspected of being rigged, had become the sole legal party. Corruption and mismanagement had run rampant, both under Momoh and his predecessor, Siaka Stevens.

In March 1991, the country was plunged into a civil war, pitting the government against the invading Revolutionary United Front, under the command of Foday Sankoh. Front-line government soldiers were poorly supplied and fed, and some complained they had not been paid for three months. Captain Strasser witnessed the deplorable conditions firsthand, being assigned to a unit fighting the rebels. When he received a shrapnel wound, he became disgruntled when he found he could not be evacuated.

== The coup ==
Strasser and other junior officers organised a coup. They took a convoy to Freetown, the capital, and seized the State House, where Momoh's office was located, though Momoh had not yet arrived. The State House was briefly recovered by loyal troops, but soon fell back into the mutineers' hands. When Momoh was found, he was sent into exile by helicopter to Guinea.

== Results ==
Joseph Opala, an American historian who had spent much of his adult life in the country, was rounded up and dispatched to the American ambassador to see if the US government would recognise the new regime. African-American ambassador Johnny Young stated that, while it was not generally done, an exception would be made in this case because the previous government had not been democratically elected and also because of the desperate state of the country.

Banning all political parties, the National Provisional Ruling Council was formed as the new government. Parliament was dissolved.

== See also ==
- Yahya Kanu
