= Solomon Musa =

Sierra Leonean politician and military figure (1966–1999)

Solomon Anthony James Musa (1966, Freetown, Sierra Leone – January 1999), also known as SAJ Musa, was an important military and political figure in the Sierra Leone Civil War.

== Overview ==
In late April 1992, the Sierra Leone Army was in disarray. They had not been paid their monthly wages for three months, they were hungry, and morale was very low. Along with around 100 others, Lt. Solomon Musa and Valentine Strasser went to Freetown, the capital of Sierra Leone to protest against president Joseph Momoh. The situation escalated to a coup, and in the confusion Strasser emerged as chairman of the National Provisional Ruling Council, and leader of Sierra Leone.

During the four-year reign of the young Strasser, Musa played the role of Strasser's deputy, advisor and henchman. In December 1992, Musa was responsible for the execution of a group of Momoh's supporters, including Bambay Kamara, Yahya Kanu, and Colonel K. M. S. Dumbaya, who were accused of organizing a counter-coup against Strasser, although the trio had been in jail since May. During the period from November 1992 to 5 July 1993, Musa served as Chairman of the Council of State Secretaries. He and his wife, Tina, left the country, allegedly at gunpoint, after a series of arguments with Strasser. After this, they lived in Ladywood, Birmingham, UK, where they were given refugee status, a Local Authority house, and a UN grant to enable Musa to study at Birmingham University. When Johnny Paul Koroma, of the Armed Forces Revolutionary Council removed elected president Ahmad Tejan Kabbah from power in May 1997, Musa returned and was appointed to the position of chief secretary of state of the Kono district.

There is some confusion about the exact sequence of events, and who actually initiated the coup. One of the first actions of the revolting soldiers was to seize the Parliament building and hang out placards calling for Musa to return as president. He travelled via Guinea, where he was briefly arrested, and by the time he reached Freetown, Koroma, who had been in Pademba Road Jail after a previous coup attempt, had declared himself President. Musa continued to be an important figure in the military and politics of the country, as his voice and actions were highly influential, and state politics in Kono, as elsewhere in Sierra Leone, were beset with corruption, especially relating to diamond mining.

On 15 November 1998, a group of rebels led by Musa kidnapped an Italian Catholic missionary, Father Mario Guerra. Musa demanded a satellite telephone, medical supplies, and radio contact with his wife, who had been arrested in September. He wanted to surrender to either the UN or the ECOMOG force, as things were not going well for him, and he was afraid of being captured by the Kamajors. This did not happen, however, and he and his group were heavily involved in the rebel advance on Freetown at the end of 1998. (Archives of Sierra Leone Web)

== Death ==
In late December 1999, Solomon Musa died, allegedly of wounds received from shrapnel after an ammunition store exploded in Benguema prior to the AFRC attack on Freetown in January 1999. It now appears that he was killed, probably by his own lieutenants, on the orders of Charles Taylor, whose orders he had been refusing. This version of his death could also be traced back to rumours spread by Tejan Kabbah.
