= Samuel Komba Kambo =

Samuel Komba Kambo is a retired captain in the Republic of Sierra Leone Armed Forces. Kambo was one of six young soldiers in the Sierra Leonean Army that ousted president Joseph Saidu Momoh and the All People's Congress government on April 29, 1992. (the 1992 Sierra Leonean coup d'état)

He later became Energy Minister in the Sierra Leone Government

In August 1994, Kambo quit the NPRC and fled to the United States to study at the University of Texas on a diplomatic visa, where he received a master's of business administration, and then worked as a fuels analyst for a Texas utility,

In October 2007, he was arrested by United States immigration authority in San Antonio, Texas for his alleged role in summary executions of 29 counter-revolutionaries in his home country. He denied any involvement, and an immigration judge agreed there was no credible evidence that he had any role in the suppression of counter-revolutionaries, and ordered him released and entitled to permanent residence. The immigration authorities appealed, and he was held in prison during the appeal. NPRC soldiers. He was ordered released on bond October 18, 2007 by U.S. District Judge Xavier Rodriguez. The immigration authorities appealed this ruling to the Board of Immigration Appeals. On November 28, 2008, the appeals board ruled that though he may not have participated or ordered the killings, he has "aware of them and ... continued to serve in a leadership post", and ordered him denied residency. In 2009 the United States Board of Immigration Appeals ordered Komba Kambo removed from the U.S.
