= Allen Town =

- Location within Sierra Leone
- Coordinates: 8.442081°N 13.170929°W
- Country: Sierra Leone
- Province: Western Area
- District: Western Area Urban District

Allen Town is a residential neighborhood in the East End of Freetown, Sierra Leone. It is densely populated, with an ethnically diverse population.

Allen Town is the home of Former head of state Captain Valentine Strasser.
