= Valentine Strasser =

Head of State of Sierra Leone from 1992 to 1996

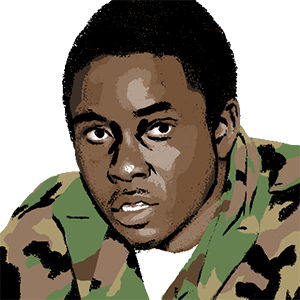
- Illustration of Strasser produced by Voice of America

4th Head of State of Sierra Leone
- In office 1 May 1992 – 16 January 1996
- Deputy: Solomon Musa (1992–1993); Julius Maada Bio (1993–1996)
- Preceded by: Yahya Kanu
- Succeeded by: Julius Maada Bio

2nd Chairman of the National Provisional Ruling Council
- In office 1 May 1992 – 16 January 1996
- Deputy: Solomon Musa; Julius Maada Bio
- Preceded by: Yahya Kanu
- Succeeded by: Julius Maada Bio

Personal details
- Born: Valentine Esegragbo Melvine Strasser; 26 April 1967 (age 59) Freetown, Sierra Leone
- Spouse: Gloria Strasser
- Children: 2
- Education: University of Warwick, Coventry, England, UK
- Profession: Army officer

Military service
- Allegiance: Sierra Leone
- Branch/service: Republic of Sierra Leone Military Forces
- Years of service: 1985–1996
- Rank: Captain
- Battles/wars: Sierra Leone Civil War

Valentine Esegragbo Melvine Strasser (born 26 April 1967) is a Sierra Leonean former military officer who served as the head of state of Sierra Leone from 1992 to 1996. He became the world's youngest head of state in 1992, seizing power three days after his 25th birthday.

Strasser was born and raised in the neighbourhood of Allen Town in the east end of Sierra Leone's capital Freetown to Creole parents. He enlisted in the Republic of Sierra Leone Military Forces (RSLMF) at age eighteen, immediately after graduating from secondary school. In the context of the Sierra Leone Civil War which had erupted in the previous year, he led a coup d'état in 1992 which overthrew president Joseph Saidu Momoh. He then established the National Provisional Ruling Council (NPRC) military junta. During the war, he hired Executive Outcomes, a South African mercenary firm to repel the Revolutionary United Front (RUF) rebel group.

As the war continued, after nearly four years in power, Strasser was ousted in a second military coup in 1996, led by his deputy, Brigadier General Julius Maada Bio. Following his overthrow, he lived in England where he unsuccessfully sought asylum. He later unsuccessfully attempted to enter the Gambia in 2000 before eventually returning to Sierra Leone.

== Early life ==
Valentine Esegragbo Melvin Strasser was born on 26 April 1967 in Freetown, the capital of Sierra Leone, to parents from the Creole ethnic group. At the time of Strasser's birth, Sir Albert Margai was the Prime Minister of Sierra Leone when the country was a parliamentary government. Strasser grew up in the neighbourhood of Allen Town, in the extreme East End of Freetown.

Strasser completed his secondary education at the Sierra Leone Grammar School in Freetown and graduated in 1985 at age eighteen. While in secondary school, Strasser was a gifted student in math and chemistry.

== Military career ==
On graduation from secondary school in 1985, he enlisted in the Republic of Sierra Leone Military Forces (RSLMF) at the age of eighteen during the government of President Siaka Stevens, and was deployed for military training as a cadet officer at the Benguema Military Training Academy in Benguema, a town located just outside Freetown. After his training, he was commissioned into the Sierra Leone army at the young age of nineteen. He was posted to a military barracks in Daru, Kailahun District in Eastern Sierra Leone.

The Revolutionary United Front (RUF) led by Foday Sankoh began their first attack on 25 March 1991 in Buedu villages in Kailahun District. Strasser and other soldiers who were already in a military barracks in Kailahun, were sent to command and rout the rebellion against the RUF.

Before President Momoh was removed by his successor, Valentine Strasser fought against the Liberian invasion in Sierra Leone, particularly in the East and South of Sierra Leone. Strasser in his fight had to go up against domestic rebels, also known as sobels. President Momoh's presidency was not long-lasting because he denied the demands of the people of Sierra Leone who at the time of his regime wanted a more cooperative political system and thought Momoh provided nothing different than his predecessor.”

== 1992 coup and tenure as head of state ==
During Strasser's time at the war front in Kailahun District against the RUF, the Government of Sierra Leone led by president Joseph Saidu Momoh hardly supplied enough boots to the soldiers and the necessary military equipment to help fortify Strasser and his fellow soldiers in the war against the RUF. The soldiers never received their salaries on time and their welfare was hardly at the top of the government's list of priorities.

After many appeals, warnings or threats, the young soldiers decided to march down in their combat from Kailahun to the State House in Freetown on 29 April 1992, to protest about their setbacks in pursuing the war, demanding their outstanding salaries. The group of soldiers was led by Strasser himself and his two best friends and fellow soldiers Sergeant Solomon Musa and Captain Sahr Sandy. The appearance of the soldiers in the capital city forced president Momoh to flee the country and he went into exile in Conakry, Guinea. This power vacuum motivated Strasser and his men to seize power, forming the NPRC, with Strasser as its leader and the Head of State of the country. Strasser became the youngest Head of State in the world at just twenty five years old.

== 1996 coup ==
In January 1996, after nearly four years in power, Strasser was ousted in another military coup, but this time it was his own NPRC members who were not satisfied with his handling of the peace process. The coup was led by his deputy, Brigadier General Julius Maada Bio, along with Colonel Tom Nyuma and Captain Komba Mondeh. Bio quickly rose as the leader of the coup, with the support of Nyuma and Mondeh and took over as Head of State of Sierra Leone.

== Post-leadership ==
Following his overthrow, Strasser was given a fellowship by the UN to study law at the University of Warwick in Coventry, England, but stopped his studies after 18 months. In 2000, Strasser's application for asylum in England was rejected; he then left for the Gambia, only to be denied entry. He eventually returned to Sierra Leone, where he lived in poverty on a small pension in Grafton, east of Freetown, and worked at the ICT Institute providing computer skills for youths.

In January 2019, he fell gravely ill and was flown to Ghana for treatment. His left leg was partially amputated due to peripheral artery disease. After undergoing rehabilitation, he returned to Sierra Leone in July 2021, and received an apartment from President Bio. Amadu Makalo Koita, a member of the opposition All People's Congress, later alleged that the government was keeping Strasser under house arrest.

Political offices
Preceded by Yahya Kanu	Chairman of the National Provisional Ruling Council of Sierra Leone; 1992–1996	Succeeded by Julius Maada Bio
