= Yahya Kanu =

Sierra Leonean politician

Colonel Yahya Kanu (born in Magburaka, Tonkolili District, Sierra Leone, died 29 December 1992) Kanu was a loyalist to President Joseph Saidu Momoh. He was first reported by Reuters to have led the coup, but that same day he went onto the BBC's Focus on Africa to deny that role, claiming instead that he was attempting to negotiate with the mutineers. He was imprisoned by Valentine Strasser, who eventually took power in the coup. Kanu was later executed by Valentine Strasser, Solomon Musa, Maada Bio and Idriss Kamara on a beach near Freetown, after being accused of organizing a counter-coup with All People's Congress supporter James Bambay Kamara. The pair were at the time housed in the Pademba Road jail in Freetown.

The British-trained Kanu had won a reputation as one of the most dynamic battlefront commanders during the war that broke out when Revolutionary United Front rebels of Foday Sankoh crossed into Sierra Leone in 1991 from part of Liberia under the control of the Liberian rebel leader Charles Taylor. After the rebels approached the eastern Sierra Leone city of Kenema in mid-1991, they were pushed back by Kanu's Cobra battalion with the help of Liberian irregular forces, mostly refugees from Samuel Doe's army, who went on to become a component of ULIMO. The combined force quickly routed the rebels from the towns of Gandorhun and Zimmi before reaching the Mano River Bridge crossing into Liberia. These gains were lost later in the war as control of towns frequently changed hands, something that battlefront soldiers often blamed on a lack of resources from Freetown. This was a major factor contributing to the 1992 coup.

Political offices
Preceded by Joseph Saidu Momoh	President of Sierra Leone; 1992	Succeeded by Valentine Strasser
