= James Bambay Kamara =

Sierra Leonean Inspector General (Died 1992)

- Died: 29 December 1992
- Cause of death: Execution
- Citizenship: Sierra Leone
- Occupation: Police Officer
- Years active: 1987-1992

James Bambay Kamara (died 1992) served as Inspector General of the Sierra Leone Police Force from 1987 until 1992.

== Early life and education ==
He was an ethnic Limba.

== Career ==
Bambay Kamara became Inspector General of the Sierra Leone Police in 1987.

=== 1987 Treason Trial ===
In 1987 Bambay Kamara fell out with Vice President Francis Minah over politics. The dispute ended with Bambay Kamara implicating Minah in the 1987 attempted coup against President Joseph Saidu Momoh. Kamara claimed that Minah knew about the plot and did not report it. After a 5 month trial, Minah was executed for treason.

== 1992 Military Junta ==
In April 1992, Bambay Kamara was one of 29 senior politicians arrested by Solomon Anthony James Musa on orders from the National Provisional Ruling Council (NPRC), the military junta regime led by Valentine Strasser.

== Execution ==
Former Sierra Leone Foreign Minister Dr. Abdul Karim Koroma named Bambay Kamara's executioners in his book.

Strasser had signed the execution order.

He was executed 29 or 30 December 1992. Also executed with him on that day was Colonel James Yayah Kanu,

== Legacy ==
His son Julius is the leader of the 29 Memorial Foundation For Justice and Development, an organization which advocates for accountability for the extrajudicial executions that took place on 12 December 1992.

In 2015, the organization sent an open letter to President Ernest Bai Koroma calling for a formal apology for the execution of Inspector General Bambay Kamara which stated that they held the former head of state Captain Valentine Strasser personally responsible as he was Chairman of NPRC and Head of State at the time.

The organization expressed admiration for Brig. (Rtd.) Julius Maada Bio who had taken collective responsibility for the execution of Bambay Kamara.
