= Military ranks of Sierra Leone =

The Military ranks of Sierra Leone are the military insignia used by the Republic of Sierra Leone Armed Forces. Being a former British colony, Sierra Leone shares a rank structure similar to that of the United Kingdom. While possessing an air force, the status of its equipment is unknown.

== Commissioned officer ranks ==
The rank insignia of commissioned officers.

| Rank group | General / flag officers | | | | Senior officers | | | Junior officers |
|---|---|---|---|---|---|---|---|---|---|---|
| Sierra Leone Army |
| Sierra Leone Army | General | Lieutenant general | Major general | Brigadier | Colonel | Lieutenant colonel | Major | Captain | First lieutenant | Second lieutenant |
| Sierra Leone Navy |
| Sierra Leone Navy | | | Rear admiral | Commodore | Captain | Commander | Lieutenant commander | Lieutenant | Lieutenant (junior grade) | Sub-Lieutenant |
| Rank group | General / flag officers | | | | Senior officers | | | Junior officers |

== Other ranks ==
The rank insignia of non-commissioned officers and enlisted personnel.

| Rank group | Senior NCOs | | | | Junior NCOs | | Enlisted |
|---|---|---|---|---|---|---|---|---|
| Sierra Leone Army | | | | | | | No insignia |
| Sierra Leone Army | Warrant officer class 1 | Warrant officer class 2 | Staff sergeant | Sergeant | Corporal | Lance corporal | Private (or equivalent) |
| Sierra Leone Navy |
| Sierra Leone Navy | Warrant officer class 1 | Warrant officer class 2 | Chief petty officer | Petty officer | Leading seaman | | Able seaman | Seaman |
| Rank group | Senior NCOs | | | | Junior NCOs | | Enlisted |
