= Tom Nyuma =

Tom Nyuma (1971-January 26, 2014) was a Sierra Leonean military commander and the chairman of the Kailahun District council. He was elected as the chairman of Kailahun District council on July 6, 2008, with 87% of the vote, running on the opposition Sierra Leone People's Party (SLPP) ticket.

Nyuma was born in Kailahun, and was very popular in the Southern and Eastern regions of the country. In March 2012, Nyuma left the SLPP and joined the All People's Congress (APC) of President Ernest Bai Koroma.

He held the rank of lieutenant colonel in the Republic of Sierra Leone Armed Forces when he retired from active military service. On 29 April 1992, Nyuma was one of the young officers in the Sierra Leonean army who ousted the APC government led by Joseph Saidu Momoh. They established the National Provisional Ruling Council (NPRC) to run the government. During the NPRC administration, Nyuma was the commander of the Eastern Province. He was a member of the Kissi ethnic group and an alumnus of Ohio State University in Columbus, Ohio, US.
