= Joseph Saidu Momoh =

President of Sierra Leone from 1985-92

Major General Joseph Saidu Momoh OOR OBE
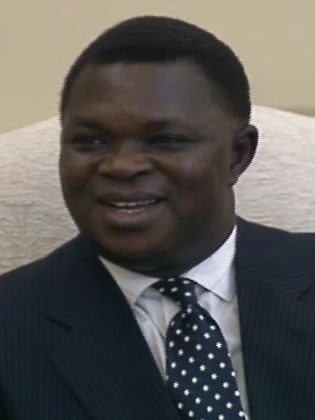
- Momoh in 1988

2nd President of Sierra Leone
- In office 28 November 1985 – 29 April 1992
- Vice President: Francis Minah (1985–1987); Abu Bakar Kamara (1987–1991); Abdulai Conteh (1991–1992)
- Preceded by: Siaka Stevens
- Succeeded by: Valentine Strasser

Personal details
- Born: 26 January 1937 Binkolo, Bombali District, British Sierra Leone
- Died: 3 August 2003 (aged 66) Conakry, Guinea
- Party: All People's Congress (APC)
- Spouse(s): Fatmata Momoh, Hannah Momoh
- Children: JS Momoh jr

Military service
- Allegiance: Sierra Leone
- Branch/service: Royal West African Frontier Force; Sierra Leone Army
- Years of service: 1958–1985
- Rank: Major General

Joseph Saidu Momoh OOR OBE (26 January 1937 – 3 August 2003) was a Sierra Leonean politician and military officer who served as the second President of Sierra Leone from November 1985 to 29 April 1992.

Momoh was a member of the Limba ethnic group and briefly began a career in civil service before joining the military in 1958. Following the rise to power of Siaka Stevens, Momoh was appointed force commander in 1971, promoted to major-general in 1983, and became the secretary general of the country's sole legal party, the All People's Congress in 1985.

Stevens' retired later that year and was succeeded by Momoh after a presidential election in which Momoh was the only candidate. He inherited a deteriorating economy, but made significant improvements in combatting corruption. In foreign policy, he enjoyed positive relations with the United States and the United Kingdom. In 1991, the Revolutionary United Front (RUF) rebel group incited the Sierra Leone Civil War with the goal of overthrowing him. Later that year, he introduced a new constitution allowing for a multiparty system. Despite this, he was overthrown in a coup d'état the following year led by Valentine Strasser, who cited his government's unpaid salaries and poor logistical supply to frontline soldiers fighting against the RUF as motives. He fled into exile in Guinea, where he died in 2003, one year after the end of the war.

== Early life ==
Joseph Saidu Momoh was born on 26 January 1937 in Binkolo, Bombali District in the Northern Province of British Sierra Leone to Limba parents. In the early 1940s, his family moved to Freetown, ultimately settling in Wilberforce. His family were Christians.

From 1951 to 1955, he was educated at the West African Methodist Collegiate School. Momoh was very athletic and enjoyed playing tennis, basketball and volleyball. He played competitive football for the Young Stars FC at Makeni and Blackpool FC.

He completed his education at the Government Clerks School, Technical Institute.

== Career ==
=== Civil service ===
In 1956, Momoh worked as third grade clerk in Sierra Leone's civil service. He resigned from this position in 1958 in order to join the armed forces.

=== Military career ===
Momoh's military career began in 1958, when he enlisted in the Royal West African Frontier Force (RWAFF) as a private. He trained at the Regular Officers Training School in Ghana and the Nigerian Military Training Academy. He then travelled to the United Kingdom to train at the School of Infantry at Hythe and the Mons Officer Cadet School in Aldershot.

He was commissioned as second lieutenant in the Royal Sierra Leone Military Forces in 1963. He was elevated to the rank of major and given command at Moa Barracks, Kailahun.

In 1969, Momoh became lieutenant colonel and commanding officer of the First Battalion. A year later, he was promoted to the rank of Colonel.

He was appointed deputy force commander in 1971 by President Siaka Stevens, after a coup attempt by Brigadier John Amadu Bangura. Momoh succeeded Bangura as force commander in November 1971.

In 1974, he was appointed minister of state with cabinet status. He became major-general in 1983.

=== President of Sierra Leone ===
In 1985, Momoh became secretary-general and head of the All People's Congress (APC). The same year, he succeeded President Siaka Stevens by becoming the only candidate in a one-party election in the form of a referendum on 8 October 1985.

Momoh became the second President of Sierra Leone and he served from 28 November 1985 to 29 April 1992.

Momoh declared a state of economic emergency early in his rule, granting himself greater control over Sierra Leone's economy, but he was not regarded as a dictator. Instead, his people viewed him as far too weak and inattentive to the affairs of state, allowing his notoriously corrupt advisors to manipulate matters behind the scenes.

Momoh had inherited a disintegrating economy from his predecessor and he was unable to stop the trend. The country's currency decreased in value. Sierra Leone reached the point under President Momoh where it could not afford to import gasoline and fuel oil, and the country went without electricity for months at a time.

Momoh had also inherited a system that was rife with corruption and the instability which corruption led to. Momoh took huge strides to root out graft, cronyism, embezzlement, influence peddling and extortion from within Sierra Leone's government. International observers considered him mostly successful in these endeavors. This led to him forming a good relationship with British Prime Minister Margaret Thatcher and American President Ronald Reagan, who were encouraged by advisors to meet with Momoh and form a good partnership with him as a way of welcoming Sierra Leone out of the instability it had fallen into for so much of the 1970s and 1980s. Both leaders increased aid to Sierra Leone and increased governmental cooperation between their governments and that of Momoh's administration throughout 1987 and early 1988.

=== 1987 treason trial ===
On 23 March 1987, police reported that a group of conspirators was plotting to assassinate Momoh and stage a coup d'état after they raided a house in Freetown and discovered a cache of weapons, including rocket launchers.

James Bambay Kamara, the Inspector General of the Sierra Leone Police, gave the order to arrest First Vice President Francis Minah, G.M.T. Kaikai, Jamil Sahid Mohamed and fifteen others.

Minah was a personal friend of Momoh and while he did not personally believe that Minah was involved in the plot, he did not want to oppose Inspector General Kamara. Momoh did not intervene on behalf of Minah.

The treason trial went on for five months until October 1987 when the jury delivered a guilty verdict. The former First Vice President and 17 others were convicted of treason and sentenced to death. Jamil Sahid Mohamed escaped to Lebanon where he remained in exile. They were executed on warrants signed by Momoh. A team of international observers from Norway, Sweden, Switzerland, Algeria and South Korea all concurred that the trial was justified, and was not politically motivated.

=== The 1991 Persian Gulf War ===
Under Momoh's leadership, Sierra Leone joined the coalition of nations that opposed Saddam Hussein's occupation of Kuwait.

=== The SCIPA Group ===
The SCIPA Group was an Israeli mineral company led by Nir Guaz that arrived in Sierra Leone in 1989. SCIPA bought its way into Momoh's favor by providing the government with loans and enabling Sierra Leone to enter into negotiations with the International Monetary Fund. On Christmas Eve 1989, Momoh had Guaz arrested, charged with economic sabotage and deported from Sierra Leone.

In September 1991, after the start of the Sierra Leone Civil War, Momoh ushered in a new constitution which dismantled the one-party state established in 1978 and instituted multiparty democracy. He also played a great part in dissolving tribalism. He was congratulated on this by British Prime Minister John Major and American President George H. W. Bush, who both declared these reforms as "important steps towards democratization" and "essential steps forward." Momoh said John Major had proven to be a "genuine friend of Sierra Leone" and he referred to George H.W. Bush as a "great leader of the world."

== Military coup ==
Momoh's efforts at reform came too late to rescue Sierra Leone from chaos. He was overthrown in a military coup staged by Valentine Strasser, a 25-year-old army captain, in April 1992.

In April 1992, a group of young soldiers marched to Freetown from the war front where they had been fighting the Revolutionary United Front (RUF) led by Foday Sankoh. Incensed by terrible working conditions, unpaid salaries and a lack of government support they staged a coup d'état.

On 29 April 1992, the soldiers, led by Captain Valentine Strasser announced the military coup on the radio.

Momoh fled to Guinea and sought political asylum.

== Exile and death ==
Momoh was granted political asylum in neighboring Guinea by President Lansana Conté. He took up residence in a mansion in Nongo Tadi, Conakry. Momoh died on 3 August 2003 at the age of 66, Momoh spent the last years of his life as a guest of the military government in Guinea. Foday Sankoh had died a few days earlier.

== Honours ==
In 1971, Momoh was made an Officer of the Most Excellent Order of the British Empire. He was decorated as an Officer of the Order of the Rokel in 1974 by President Siaka Stevens.

- Sierra Leone: Order of the Rokel (1974)
- United Kingdom: Order of the British Empire (1971)

Political offices
Preceded by Siaka Stevens	President of Sierra Leone; 1985–1992	Succeeded by Ahmad Tejan Kabbah
