= Republic of Sierra Leone Armed Forces =

Combined armed forces of Sierra Leone

- Sierra Leone Armed Forces insignia
- Founded: 1961
- Current form: 2002
- Service branches: Sierra Leone Army; Sierra Leone Navy; Sierra Leone Air Force
- Headquarters: Military Forces HQ, Murray Town Barracks, Freetown, Sierra Leone
- Website: Official website

Leadership
- Commander-in-chief: Julius Maada Bio
- Minister of Defence: Kellie Hassan Conteh
- Chief of Defence Staff: Lt. General Amara Idara Bangura

Personnel
- Military age: 17
- Active personnel: 13,000

Expenditure
- Budget: $10.6 million (2006 est)
- Percent of GDP: 2.3% (2006)

Industry
- Foreign suppliers: Brazil; China; India; Indonesia; Israel; Russia; South Africa; Turkey; Ukraine; Vietnam

Related articles
- History: Congo Crisis; Ndogboyosoi War; Sierra Leone Civil War
- Ranks: Military ranks of Sierra Leone

The Republic of Sierra Leone Armed Forces are the armed forces of Sierra Leone, responsible for the territorial security of Sierra Leone's borders and defending the national interests of Sierra Leone within the framework of the 1991 Sierra Leone Constitution.

The RSLAF was formed after independence in 1961, on the basis of elements of the former British Royal West African Frontier Force, then present in the Sierra Leone Colony and Protectorate.

== Organization ==
=== Leadership ===
- The President of Sierra Leone is constitutionally the commander-in-chief of the armed forces.
- The Sierra Leone Ministry of Defence and National Security is in charge of supervising the military. The department is headed by a civilian minister of defence and national security, part of the president's cabinet.
- The Chief of the Defence Staff (CDS) is the professional head of the RSLAF. The CDS is responsible for the administration and the operational control of the RSLAF. It is the highest rank military position within the armed forces.

=== Military education ===
The Horton Command and Staff College (HCSC) is attached to the Institute of Public Administration and Management (IPAM) at the University of Sierra Leone.

== History ==
Prior to Sierra Leone becoming a republic in 1971, the military was known as the Royal Sierra Leone Military Force.

The RSLAF seized control in 1968, bringing the National Reformation Council into power. On 19 April 1971, when Sierra Leone became a republic, the Royal Sierra Leone Military Force was renamed as the Republic of Sierra Leone Military Force (RSLMF). The RSLMF remained a single service organisation until 1979, when the Sierra Leone Navy was established. It then remained largely unchanged for 16 years until in 1995 when the Defence Headquarters was established and the Sierra Leone Air Wing was established. The RSLMF was then renamed into the Republic of Sierra Leone Armed Forces with the unification of the Sierra Leone Air Force and Navy by at the time president Ahmad Tejan Kabbah.

The Sierra Leone Armed Forces is headed by the Chief of Defence Staff, who is the most senior military officer in the Sierra Leone Army. The President of Sierra Leone has the constitutional authority to dismiss the Chief of Defence Staff of the Sierra Leone Armed Forces at any time.

Major General Brima Sesay was the Chief of Defence Staff from 30 November, 2017, when he succeeded John Milton.

Currently, the incumbent Chief of Defence Staff of the Sierra Leone Armed Forces is Lt. General Amara Idara Bangura who was appointed on November 19, 2024.

== Sierra Leone Army ==
Sierra Leone brigade headquarters

The Army is modelled on the British Army and came into existence after independence in 1961. The core of the army was based on the Sierra Leone Battalion of the Royal West African Frontier Force, which became the Royal Sierra Leone Regiment and later the Republic of Sierra Leone Regiment.

In 1991, around the start of the Sierra Leone Civil War, the army went on the offensive towards the end of the year with support from Guinea. In 1992, the army had grown to 6,150 personnel under President Joseph Saidu Momoh in a 'poorly designed strategy that eradicated the few remaining elements of cohesion in the military... recruits were mainly drifters, rural and urban unemployed, a fair number of hooligans, drug addicts, and thieves.'

A similar expansion effort after Valentine Strasser took over aimed to build the army to 14,000, using young criminals, school drop-outs, and semi-literate youths. 'In consequence, the army became further fragmented, leading to the complete breakdown of command and control during the war, and again after the AFRC coup of 1997.'

During the long Sierra Leone civil war which the government fought against the Revolutionary United Front from 1991 to 2002, the 1992 Sierra Leonean coup d'état brought the armed forces into power again. In 1997 the Armed Forces Revolutionary Council seized power. Over 15,000 perished during the war. After peace returned, the armed forces were slowly reduced in size, from around 13,500 personnel in 2007 to 8,500 in 2010. The British Armed Forces, in the shape of the roughly 100-strong International Military Assistance Training Team (IMATT), is assisting in the formation of the new armed forces. IMATT is slated to downsize to 45–55 personnel by the end of 2010.

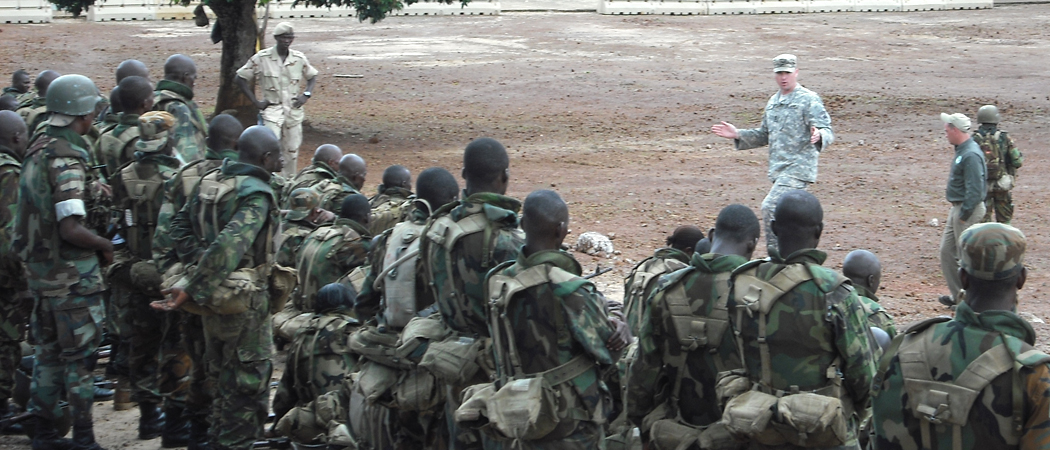
Maj. Gen. David R. Hogg (center), commander U.S. Army Africa inspects Sierra Leonean troops during a deployment ceremony on May 20, 2011.

Today the army is by far the largest Armed Forces branch and is responsible for protection of the state borders, the security of administered territories and defending the national interests of Sierra Leone within the framework of its international obligations. It had an active force of about 13,300 personnel circa 2007. There were plans to reduced strength to 8,500 by 2011. However, the reduction in strength to 8,500 was achieved by the end of 2009.

The force appears to consist of three brigades, 3 Brigade, in the past headquartered at Kenema, but as of 2011 seemingly at Murray Town Barracks, Freetown, which covers the Eastern Province. 3 Brigade probably includes 9th Battalion RSLAF at Simbakoro outside Koidu).

From 1985 to 1991, 1st Battalion was at Wilberforce Barracks, Freetown. Elsewhere are 4 Brigade, at Teko Barracks, Makeni, which covers the Northern Province (including 2nd Battalion RSLAF at Teko Barracks, Makeni, as of 2003), and 5 Brigade, which covers the Southern Province from headquarters at Gondama Barracks, Bo. As of 2002, about six IMATT advisors were deployed with each RSLAF brigade to assist with training, planning, personnel, and operations.

As stability and peace deepened in Sierra Leone, the RSLAF aimed to create a capability to contribute to international peace support operations. Official websites stated that '..To this end the RSLAF has targeted 2007 as the base year to initiate a Company for Peace Support Operations for the Economic Community of West African States (ECOWAS), the African Union and the UN. This would be gradually increased to a battalion strength by 2010. As a demonstration of this desire, a Peace Support Operations Course was introduced into the curriculum of the Horton Military Academy in Freetown. The course was intended to enhance capacity building, and to train and prepare officers of the RSLAF for their future role and participation in international peace support operations, and especially for the proposed ECOWAS Standby Force.'

The hoped-for initial operational capability date for peacekeeping slipped until late 2009, when a Sierra Leonean reconnaissance company was deployed to Darfur as part of UNAMID.() International donors and the Government of Sierra Leone provided the $6.5 million required to equip the unit and build the base camp in-theatre, some 2,300 kilometers inland from Port Sudan. The contingent is under the command of Lieutenant Colonel S.E.T. Marah.

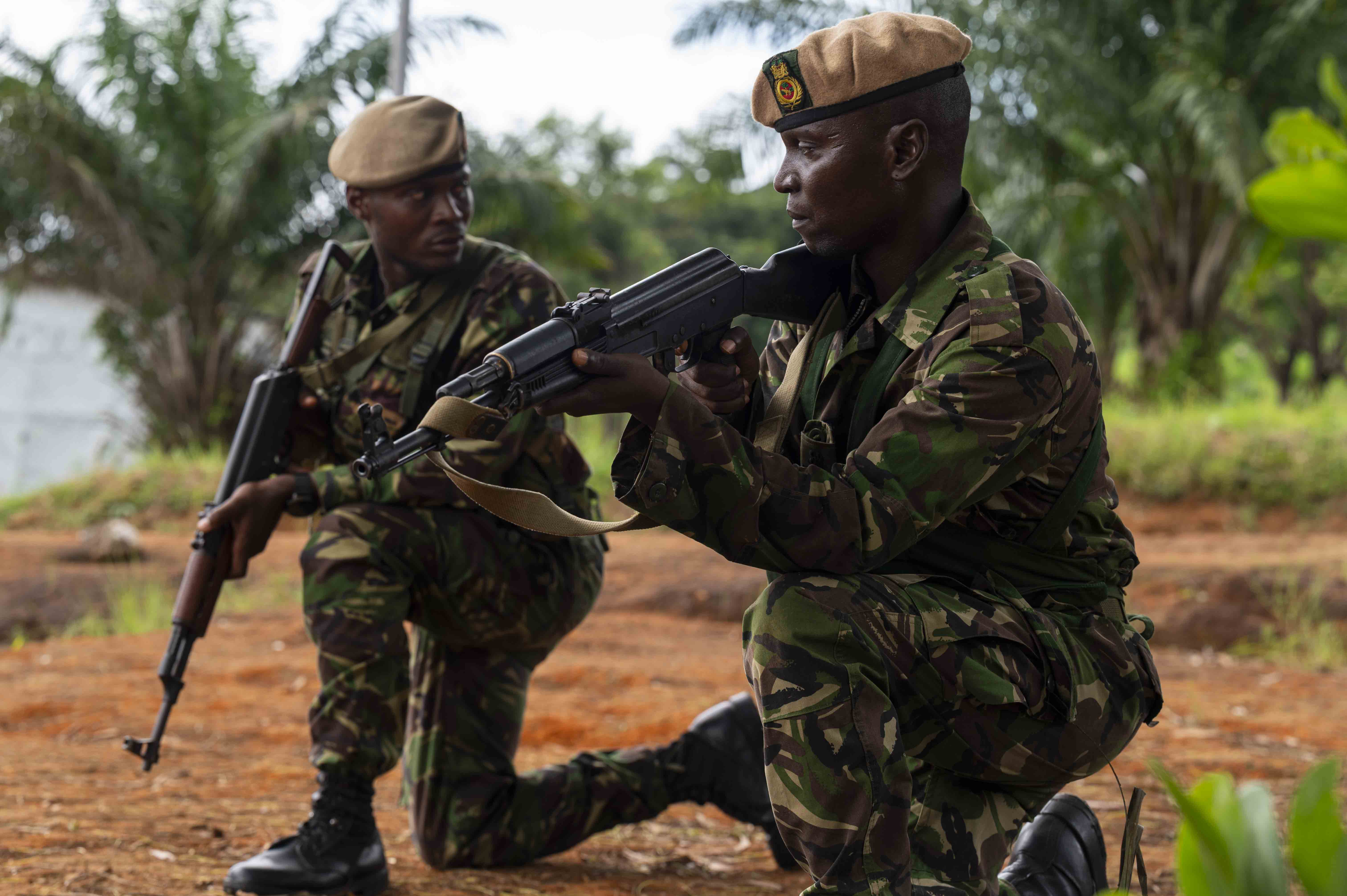
Sierra Leone Soldiers training in Freetown, 2025

Despite the enormous resources invested by the UK into security sector reform in Sierra Leone, there are continuing financial pressures. Pay for soldiers is only GBP 45 plus some rice for a private per month, rising to GBP 350 for the Chief of Defence Staff. There are continued serious financial pressures on monthly running costs, with fuel, rations, stationery, and maintenance 'for both equipment and the estate' rarely funded. Housing is generally of low quality. 'Operation Pebu' planned to build new barracks for the force, was badly planned and thus extremely over-ambitious. As a result, it was cut down to only two sites (Albrecht and Jackson 2009). In 2010 Robertshawe said that 'living accommodation for soldiers and their families is generally appalling with no running water or ablutions and often is a self-built shack or mud hut.'

Official sources said in 2012:

Without holidaying, commanders at all levels are steadfast to project on the force outfits and outputs. This line of thought strictly conforms to the dynamics of the strategically, operational and tactical construction of our thinking. Thus, the establishment of Artillery, tailoring and the Armed forces Agricultural Units sit between these initiatives. The translation of these efforts is the Establishment review of 2010. Painstakingly as a force we are striving to catch up with information technology. The Africa Endeavour programme pioneered by the United States of Africa Command (AFRICOM) has however served an eye opener to our communications need both within and out. Our data over HF communication platform continue to play a central role in facilitating communication force wide.

=== Equipment ===
Sierra Leone has very limited modern weaponry. The country has a wide variety of used second-hand foreign imported arms. The IISS Military Balance 2020 lists 31 mortars, Carl Gustav recoilless rifles, and three air defence guns in service. Other army equipment may include the Heckler & Koch G3, FN FAL, AK-47, RPD light machine gun, and the RPG-7. Special forces use the L85 bullpup rifle.

Two T-72 tanks were ordered from Ukraine in 1994 and were delivered to Sierra Leone via Poland in 1995. Although briefly serviced and maintained by South African firm Executive Outcomes, their operational status is currently unknown. Freetown's mechanized forces are backed by at least ten ex-Slovak OT-64 and three Casspir wheeled armoured personnel carriers.

== Naval component ==
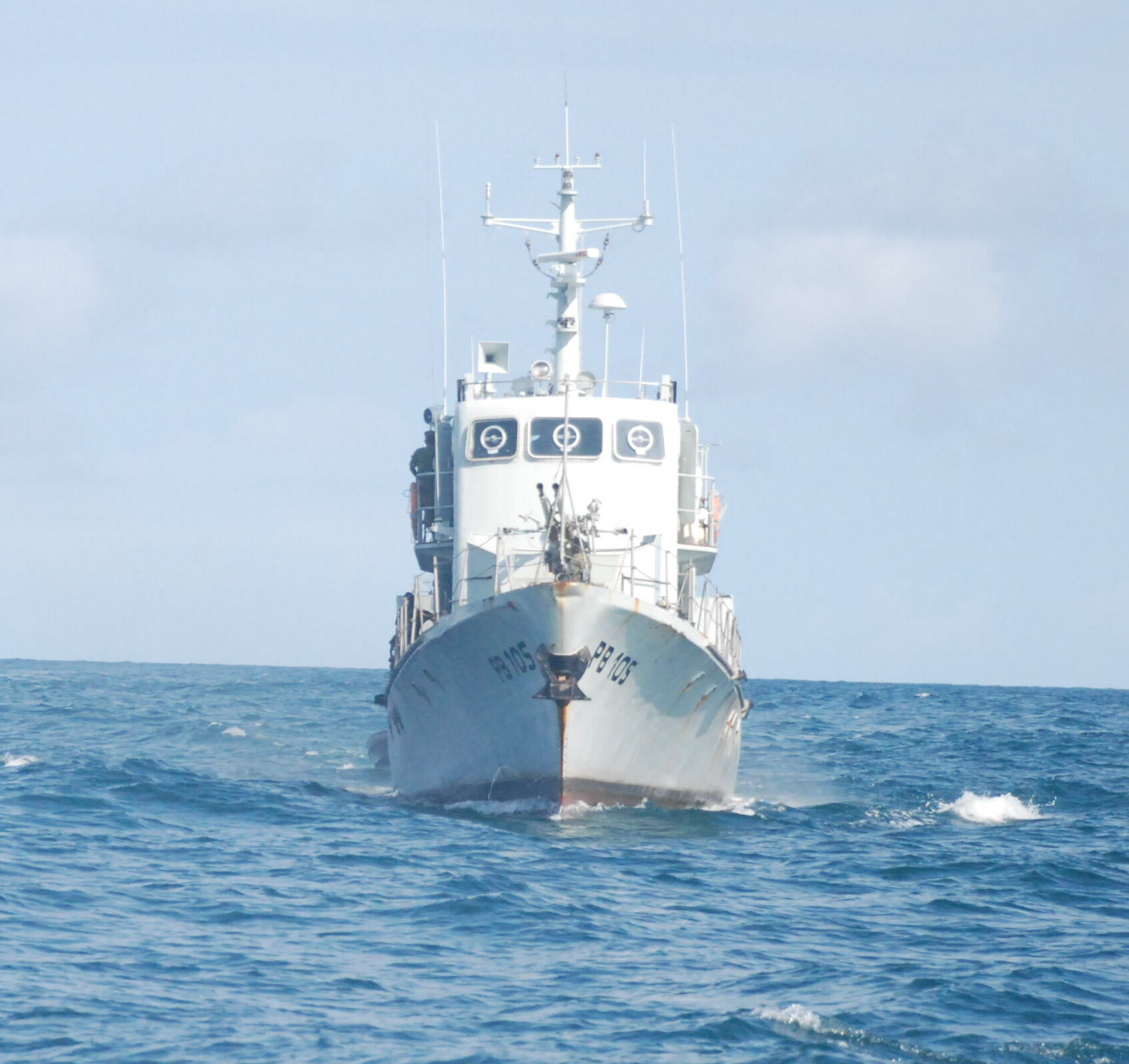
Patrol vessel PB-105

The RSLN was an arm of the Republic of Sierra Leone Armed Forces that is responsible sea patrol of Sierra Leone's territorial waters. In 2002 it was merged with the other service branches. Today the naval force has about 500 personnel and operates several small patrol craft and barges. Their primary responsibility is to protect and safeguard the territorial integrity of Sierra Leone's sea. Sierra Leone naval officers are trained by British forces. They received financial support from Britain and China.

On 25 September 2007, eight Guinean Naval officers were arrested by the Sierra Leone Navy for an act of piracy against locally licensed fishermen inside Sierra Leonean waters. British-trained Sierra Leone naval officers interrupted the high-seas hold-up by armed men in two launches on Sunday, 18 nautical miles (33 km) off the capital Freetown inside the country's 200-mile (320-km) economic exclusion zone. One of the attacking speedboats escaped north towards Guinea, while the other was seized. The eight men arrested were found with AK-47 automatic rifles and bags of fish, including high-value snapper, taken off the Sierra Leone-licensed vessels.

=== Equipment ===
- 7 Type-62 FAC, delivered between 1973 and 2006
- 3 Pompoli class LSU (delivered from Japan in 1980)

== Republic of Sierra Leone Air Force ==
Air Force roundel

In 1973, the Republic of Sierra Leone Air Force was established with Swedish help via donating two Saab-MFI 15 two seat trainers. In 2002, the air force would later be merged with other branches of the country's military to form the Republic of Sierra Leone Armed Forces, though the country still has an extremely small air component with a limited offensive capability.

The status of its equipment is unknown, but its current aircraft, being a Mil Mi-17, is currently not operable.

=== Current inventory ===
Aircraft	Origin	Type	Variant	In service	Notes
Helicopters
Mil Mi-17	Russia	Transport / Utility		1	
