= 1996 Sierra Leonean general election =

← 1985	26 and 27 February 1996 (first round); 15 March 1996 (second round)	2002 →
- Presidential election
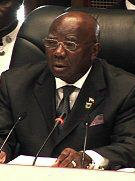

Nominee	Ahmed Tejan Kabbah	John Karefa-Smart
Party	SLPP	UNPP
Popular vote	608,419	414,335
Percentage	59.49%	40.51%
President before election
Julius Maada Bio
Military head of state
Elected President
Ahmed Tejan Kabbah
SLPP
- Parliamentary election
- 68 of 80 seats in Parliament
Party	Leader	Vote %	Seats	+/–
SLPP	Ahmed Tejan Kabbah	36.17	27	New
UNPP	John Karefa-Smart	22.14	17	New
PDP	Thaimu Bangura	15.33	12	New
APC	Edward Turay	5.69	5	−100
PDP	John Karimu	5.26	4	New
DCP	Abu Aiah Koroma	4.78	3	New
This lists parties that won seats. See the complete results below.

General elections were held in Sierra Leone on 26 and 27 February 1996 to elect the President and members of Parliament, with a second round of the presidential election on 15 March. They were the first elections since multi-party democracy had been reintroduced following a referendum on a new constitution in 1991, and the first multi-party elections held in the country since 1977.

The presidential elections were won by Ahmed Tejan Kabbah of the Sierra Leone People's Party (SLPP), who defeated John Karefa-Smart of the United National People's Party in the second round by 60% to 40%. In the parliamentary elections, the SLPP became the largest party for the first time in 29 years, winning 27 of the 68 elected seats, whilst the UNPP finished second with 17 seats.

The All People's Congress, which had governed from 1968 to 1992 (from 1978 to 1991 as the only legal party), ran in a contested election for the first time in two decades. It finished fourth in the parliamentary election, whilst its presidential candidate, Edward Turay, finished a distant fifth with only 5.1 percent of the vote.

The elections were characterized by violence.

== Electoral system ==
The elections were a transitional event as the country moved to implement the 1991 constitution and move from military rule to civilian rule. The president was elected using the two-round system. The parliamentary elections were held using proportional representation with a single nationwide constituency with a 5% electoral threshold. Previously the country had used first-past-the-post voting for parliamentary elections. The use of proportional representation in 1996 and 2002 has been described as Sierra Leone's "brief experiment" with proportional representation.

== Results ==
=== President ===
As no candidate won more than 55% of the vote in the first round, a second round of voting was held.

Candidate	Party	First round		Second round	
Candidate	Party	Votes	%	Votes	%
Ahmad Tejan Kabbah	Sierra Leone People's Party	266,893	35.80	608,419	59.49
John Karefa-Smart	United National People's Party	168,666	22.62	414,335	40.51
Thaimu Bangura	People's Democratic Party	119,782	16.07		
John Karimu	National Unity Party	39,617	5.31		
Edward Turay	All People's Congress	38,316	5.14		
Abu Aiah Koroma	Democratic Centre Party	36,779	4.93		
Abass Bundu	People's Progressive Party	21,557	2.89		
Amadu Jalloh	National Democratic Alliance	17,335	2.33		
Edward Kargbo	People's National Convention	15,798	2.12		
Desmond Luke	National Unity Movement	7,918	1.06		
Andrew Lungay	Social Democratic Party	5,202	0.70		
Andrew Turay	National People's Party	3,925	0.53		
Mohamed Sillah	National Alliance Democratic Party	3,723	0.50		
Total		745,511	100.00	1,022,754	100.00
Source: African Elections Database

=== Parliament ===
The SLPP won the most seats in the elections, but fell well short of a majority, with only 27 of the 68 elected seats.

Party	Votes	%	Seats
Sierra Leone People's Party	269,888	36.17	27
United National People's Party	165,219	22.14	17
People's Democratic Party	114,429	15.33	12
All People's Congress	42,467	5.69	5
National Unity Party	39,285	5.26	4
Democratic Centre Party	35,632	4.78	3
People's Progressive Party	21,361	2.86	0
National Democratic Alliance	20,125	2.70	0
People's National Convention	19,019	2.55	0
National Unity Movement	8,885	1.19	0
Social Democratic Party	5,900	0.79	0
National People's Party	3,992	0.53	0
Indirectly elected paramount chiefs			12
Total	746,202	100.00	80
Source: Elections Today

== Aftermath ==
On 25 May 1997 Kabbah was deposed by a coup led by Johnny Paul Koroma. However, he was returned to power by Nigerian-led ECOWAS forces on 10 March 1998.
