= Alice Koroma =

Personal details
- Born: Alice Rosalyn Koroma; June 27, 1932 Kamabai, Biriwa Chiefdom, Bombali District, British Sierra Leone
- Died: July 6, 2012 (aged 80) Makeni, Sierra Leone
- Party: All People's Congress (APC)
- Spouse: Sylvanus Koroma
- Children: Seven children, including President Ernest Bai Koroma
- Profession: teacher, politics and advocate for women rights.

Alice Rosalyn Koroma (June 27, 1932 – July 6, 2012) was the mother of Sierra Leone's president, Ernest Bai Koroma, and a longtime primary school teacher in Makeni. She was a longtime member of the Wesleyan Church congregation in Makeni, and in the 1960s she was a member of the Makeni city council from the All People's Congress (APC) party. Koroma, whose political career stems back to the 1960s, "was a strong supporter" and "advocate of women's rights". She was very active in the political scene of Sierra Leone and was a former leader of the All People's Congress (APC) Women's Congress in Bombali District in the later half of the 1960s.

Koroma, who was reportedly not suffering from any illness, died unexpectedly on June 6, 2012, in her home in the northern city of Makeni. Her death was a shocking news across Sierra Leone and many Sierra Leoneans, including politicians regardless of political parties, civil servants, religious leaders, journalists and the general population express condolences and sympathy to President Koroma and his family.

== Early life ==
Koroma was born on June 27, 1932, in the village of Kamabai, Biriwa Chiefdom, Bombali District in the Northern Province of British Sierra Leone to ethnic Limba parents. She was raised in a deeply religious Christian household. She later moved to Makeni to further her education.

== Family ==
Koroma was married to a deeply religious Christian preacher, Sylvanus Koroma, a native of Makeni. The couple had seven children and resided in Makeni. She and her husband where longtime members of the Wesleyan Church congregation in Makeni. Their oldest son is Sierra Leone's president Ernest Bai Koroma.

== Death ==
Koroma, who was reportedly not suffering from any illness, died unexpectedly on July 6, 2012, in her home in the northern city of Makeni. Her death was a shocking news across Sierra Leone and many Sierra Leoneans, including politicians, civil servants, religious leaders, journalists and the general population express condolences and sympathy to President Koroma and his family.

== Funeral service ==
Alice Koroma funeral was held at the Wesleyan Church in Makeni and was attended by many senior Sierra Leonean politicians regardless of political parties, including her son President Ernest Bai Koroma, First Lady Sia Koroma, Vice President Alhaji Samuel Sam-Sumana, former President Ahmad Tejan Kabbah former Vice President Solomon Ekuma Berewa, speaker of Parliament Abel Nathaniel Stronge, Chief Justice Haja Umu Hawa Tejan Jalloh, leader of the main opposition Sierra Leone People's Party (SLPP) John Oponjo Benjamin, leader of the PMDC Party Charles Francis Margai, defense minister, and former deputy defense minister Joe Blell.

Also in attendance at the funeral in the Wesleyan Church in Makeni included Christians and Muslims religious leaders, senior Sierra Leone Police officers, including Inspector General of the Sierra Leone Police Francis Alieu Munu, and members of the international delegations, mainly from West Africa including the First Lady of Nigeria Patience Jonathan.
