= Richard Konteh =

APC Sierra Leone Presidential Candidate Aspirant for 2023

Dr. Richard Konteh
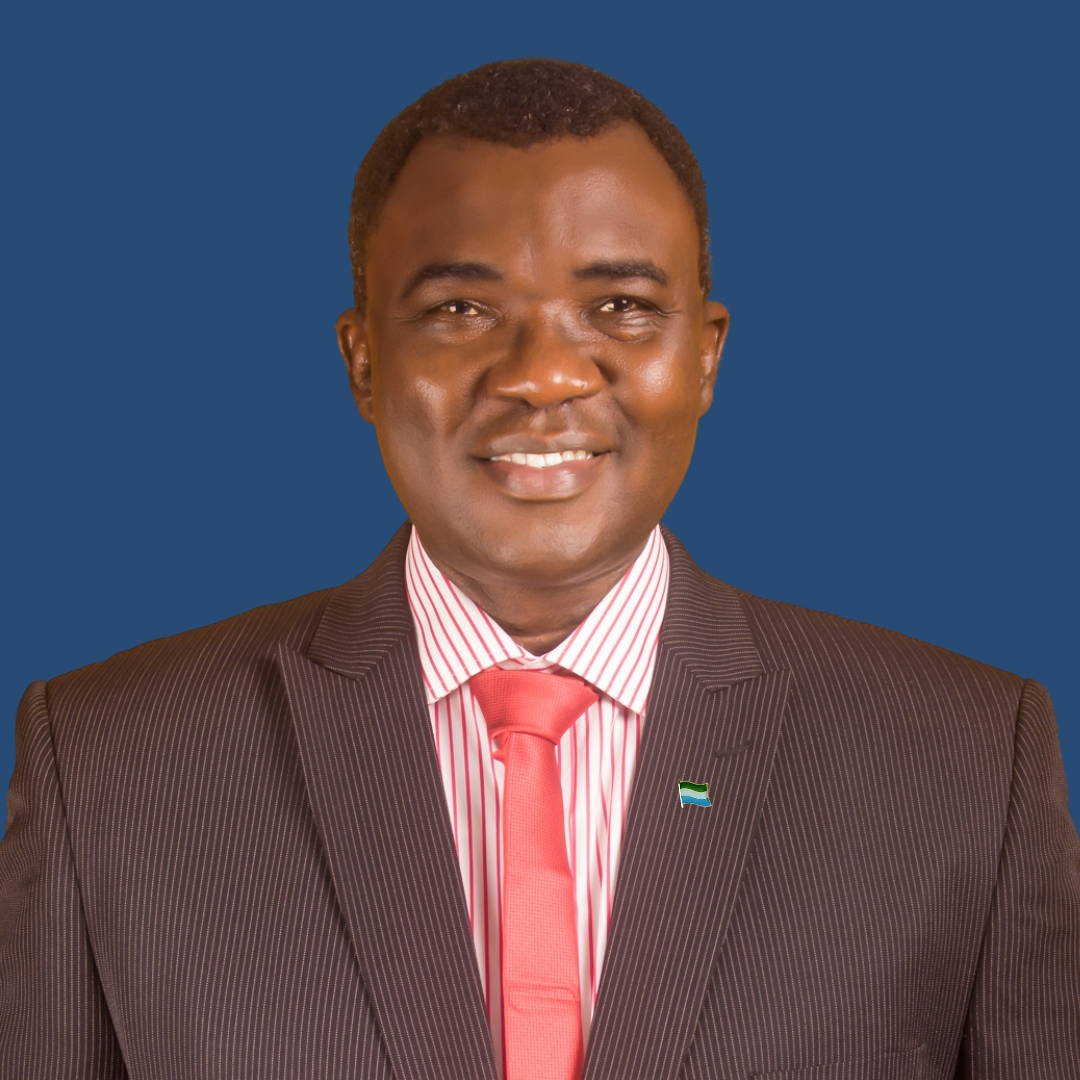

Chief of Staff to President Ernest Bai Koroma
- In office December 2012 – June 2014
- Preceded by: Kaifala Marah
- Succeeded by: Saidu Conton-Sesay

Deputy Minister of Finance and Economic Development
- In office November 2007 – November 2010
- Preceded by: Dr. James D. Rogers
- Succeeded by: Mabinty Daramy

Minister of Trade and Industry
- In office November 2010 – December 2012
- Preceded by: David Carew
- Succeeded by: Usman Boie Kamara

Personal details
- Born: 4 February 1963 (age 63) Gbendembu Village, Sierra Leone
- Party: All People's Congress
- Spouse: Isatu Zama Konteh (m. 1992)
- Children: Iyerich; Richard Jr.
- Education: Njala University
- Religion: Christianity (Wesleyan)
- Website: APC party Flagbearer website

Richard Konteh (born February 4, 1963) is a Sierra Leonean educator, public servant, and businessman.

Born in Gbendembu Village in the Gbendembu Ngowahun Chiefdom, Bombali District, Northern Province. He married his wife Isatu Zama Konteh (née Sankoh) in 1992. Together they have two children: Iyerich and Richard Jr. Richard has a bachelor's degree, a post-graduate diploma and a master's degree from Njala University, as well as a master's degree, a post-graduate diploma, and a doctoral degree from the University of Dortmund in Germany. He taught English and Geography at the Wesleyan Secondary School in Kamakwie for 2 years and lectured at Njala University College from 1993 to 2003. He also worked as Programme Manager, Monitoring and Evaluation for the Catholic Relief Services (CRS) Sierra Leone between 2000 and 2003, and later worked as Programme Manager for ECOWAS/UNDP Regional Programme from 2003 to 2005 in Peacebuilding and Post Conflict Reconstruction in West Africa.

Konteh was first appointed to Cabinet as Deputy Minister of Finance and Economic Development by President Ernest Bai Koroma shortly after his election on 17 September 2007. He was later appointed Minister of Trade and Industry in 2010, and Chief of Staff in the Office of the President in 2013.

Konteh is currently a candidate for the leadership of the All People's Congress (APC party) ahead of the 2023 Sierra Leone presidential and parliamentary elections. He is one of several candidates contesting for the APC leadership. Konteh is campaigning under the platform of unity, hence nicknamed "D-Unifier."

== Early life and education ==
=== Early life ===
Born in Gbendembu Ngowahun Chiefdom (a multicultural settlement with significant number of Loko, Temne, Fula and Mandingo tribes), Richard Konteh is the son of Kanda Barnet Konteh, a Head Teacher and school Administrator for the Wesleyan Church Sierra Leone Primary Schools, and Alice Boroma Konteh, a business woman. Konteh has eight siblings, Steven, Agnes, William, Hudson, Elizabeth, Philip (late) and Edna (late).

Konteh was born into a Christian family in the predominantly Muslim north. He became a strong Christian and member of the Wesleyan Church in Sierra Leone (WCSL) - a Protestant Christian denomination with presence in the United States, Canada, the United Kingdom, South Africa, Namibia, Sierra Leone, Liberia, Indonesia, Asia, and Australia.

=== Education ===
Konteh attended several primary schools in the Northern Region as his father who was a teacher moved many times around the region. He mostly attended the Wesleyan Church of Sierra Leone Primary Schools in the surrounding villages between Gbendembu and Kamakwie, before his parents sent him to St. Francis Secondary School in Makeni where he attended secondary School. Between 1980 and 1982, Konteh was Assistant Teacher with the Wesleyan Secondary School in Kamakwie. He furthered his education at the Njala University College in 1986 and graduated with a Bachelor of Arts Degree in Education. Upon graduation, Konteh returned again to Kamakwie as a full-time teacher at the Wesleyan Secondary School where he taught for two years.

In 1991, Konteh enrolled for a postgraduate degree in Development Planning and Management, in the faculty of Spatial Planning at the University of Dortmund in Germany. Through a scholarship offered by the university, Konteh pursued a Master of Science Degree in Development Planning and Management, jointly offered by the University of Dortmund, Germany, and the Kwame Nkrumah University of Science and Technology in Kumasi, Ghana. In 1994, Konteh went on to study Energy Planning and the Environment at the Center for Development and the Environment, University of Oslo, Norway, where he earned a post-graduate diploma. In 1996, Konteh returned to Sierra Leone and pursued another Master of Arts in Education, specializing in Geography at the Njala University College, University of Sierra Leone. In 1999, he earned a Doctorate Degree (PhD) in Spatial Planning (Specializing in Development Coordination) from the University of Dortmund in Germany.

In-between life and work, Konteh continued to educate himself in short courses and certificates in Small Scale Industries Promotion; Public Relations; Non-violent CONFLICT PREVENTION THROUGH EARLY WARNING AND EARLY RESPONSE; conflict resolution, peacebuilding and reconciliation jointly awarded by the Kroc Institute, University of Notre Dame and Catholic Relief Services conducted at the University of Notre Dame in the United States of America.

== Professional career ==
Konteh's professional career started with the Wesleyan Church of Sierra Leone (WCSL) where he served as associate director of Planning and Development from 1992 to 1993. He joined GEKO – Sierra Leone in 1994 has executive director, an affiliate of GEKO e.V in Germany. Between May 2000 and July 2002, Konteh was the Planning, Monitoring and Evaluation Specialist, for the Adventist Development and Relief Agency (ADRA) in Babadorie, Freetown. Konteh joined the Catholic Relief Services - Sierra Leone (CRS-SL) in August 2000 as Programme Manager, Monitoring and Evaluation; Justice and Peace.

In 2003, Konteh was appointed Programme Manager for ECOWAS/UNDP Regional Programme to strengthen Africa's Regional capacities in peacebuilding and ECOWAS Civil Society Focal Point. In 2005, Konteh served as General Secretary of the West African Civil Society Forum (WACSOF).

Konteh is also a proprietor of small to medium size businesses in the hospitality industry, education industry, agriculture and real estate in Sierra Leone.

== Political career ==
Konteh was first appointed as Deputy Minister of Finance and Economic Development in 2007 in the first cabinet of President Ernest Bai Koroma. A cabinet reshuffle in 2010 saw him appointment as Minister of Trade and Industry by President Ernest Bai Koroma. After the elections of 2012, where Koroma and his APC party won a second five-year term, Konteh was appointed as Chief of Staff to the President.

=== Political Controversies ===
In June 2014, Konteh was relieved of his duty as Chief Minister, detained for some time, released on bail and prosecuted for various alleged offences. A State House press release at the time stated that. “It has come to the attention of His Excellency the President that Dr. Richard Konteh, Chief of Staff in the Office of the President was not open and transparent in the conduct of official negotiations for a mining agreement with a private sector operator, thereby violating established policy, undermining existing institutional arrangements, and exposing government to potential loss of revenue. In another matter involving the illegal export of timber from Sierra Leone, the Sierra Leone Police are investigating an unauthorized executive order allegedly issued by Dr. Konteh granting an open-ended mandate to the timber harvesters, processors and exporters (SL) LTD to undertake the export of an unlimited quantity of value-added processed timber, in direct contravention of the approval granted by His Excellency the President for a fixed quantity of 30 containers only. Against this background, His Excellency the President has decided to relieve Dr. Konteh of his duties with immediate effect while the police continue with their investigations."

After 3 years of investigations and court appearances, Konteh's case was thrown out of court in Freetown for lack of evidence. During his trial, experts from the Criminal Investigation Department in Sierra Leone (CID) submitted proof that it was Konteh's signature that was forged, and not Konteh forging the president's signature as was alleged. Konteh is cleared of all wrongdoings and allegations. Dr. Konteh said in an interview that the case against him is “fake news” and a political smear campaign to damage his reputation and political career. In another interview, Konteh said “ it is the greatest misconception and lies he has ever known.”

=== SLPP’s commission of inquiry ===
In 2018, immediately after taking office, President Julius Maada Bio’s administration announced a Commissions of Inquiry (COI) approved to look into the performance of former All People’s Congress (APC) Government officials and that the scope of the inquiry will cover the period November, 2007 to April, 2018. Over 300 persons who served in senior positions in the former Koroma administration including Dr. Richard Konteh were indicted. Honourable Justice John Rosolu Bankole Thompson who headed Commission Number 2 of the three Commissions of Inquiry blasted the Bio regime for misusing the COI in a manner that was "not reasonable or permissible" and also "not cognizable" under the COI legal framework that President Bio had sent for approval to Parliament

=== Vindication ===
After a lengthy appeals court process, on February 9, 2023, the Appeals Court of Sierra Leone vindicated Dr. Richard Konteh and issued him a "Certificate of Discharge," clearing him of all adverse findings contained in the infamous Justice Biobele Commission of Inquiry (COI) report and the associated "White Paper."

=== APC party leadership campaign ===
In 2020 it was announced that the All People's Congress (APC) would hold their convention to elect a new leader that will challenge president Julius Maada Bio of the SLPP who is facing re-election for a second five-year term in 2023. Konteh announced his candidacy for the leadership of the All People's Congress (APC party) ahead of the 2023 Sierra Leone presidential and parliamentary elections. He is one of many candidates for the APC leadership.

Konteh is considered an underdog by many to the previous APC leader Samura Kamara, who became leader in 2018 by selection by then outgoing president and APC party chairman Ernest Bai Koroma, instead of election - a move that was unpopular with the majority of APC supporters APC ultimately lost the elections to the SLPP

Konteh and the other aspirants have also claimed that under the APC leadership of Samura Kamara, the party had lost a very important election that was easily winnable and, as a result, lost a significant number of seats in parliament, and has also lost trust among Sierra Leoneans, even in its traditional stronghold in Northern Sierra Leone. Konteh and the other aspirants said the party would continue to lose even more support unless there was a change in leadership, and the party would put more effort into promoting unity and taking a new direction to care more about the interests of Sierra Leoneans. The APC is divided between the old guard wing and the younger generation wing of the party seeking reforms.

During the February 18th and 19th, 2023 National Delegates Conference of the All People's Congress (APC) party held at the party's Regional Office in Makeni City, Dr. Richard Konteh finished in second place in the delegate voting exercise. Several reports have raised concerns regarding irregularities in the voting process, with some observers characterizing the event as resembling a coronation rather than a conventional competitive election.

== Publications ==
- Konteh, R. (2000) - Enhancing Community Development in Sierra Leone: The need for co-ordination (SPRING RESEARCH SERIES, Vol. 27, 2000 ISBN 3-934525-27-X).
- Konteh, R. (2000) - Co-ordination: A core problem in community development in Sierra Leone (SPRING RESEARCH SERIES, Vol. 31, pp. 54–68, 2000 ISBN 3-934525-31-8).
- Konteh, R. (2000) - Community Participation in Primary Health Care in Ghana. (SPRING RESEARCH SERIES, Vol. 31, pp. 110–119, 2000 ISBN 3-934525-31-8).
- Konteh, R. and Kamara J. (2000) - Constraints to Community Development in Sierra Leone. (SPRING RESEARCH SERIES, Vol. 31, pp. 69–84, 2000 ISBN 3-934525-31-8).
- Sankoh, O. A. and Konteh, R. (1998) - The need to harmonize environmental policies of international donor agencies with those of developing countries, (SPRING Newsletter, Number 6, 1998).
- Konteh, R. (1997) - Saving mothers' lives: Things can go wrong (WORLD HEALTH FORUM, Volume 2, Number 2, 1998).
- Konteh, R. (1997) - Socio-economic and other variables affecting maternal mortality in Sierra Leone (COMMUNITY DEVELOPMENT JOURNAL; 323:1, 1997).
- Konteh, R. (2006) - RESPONDING TO CONFLICTS: The role of civil society in West Africa (Published by United Nations University for Peace).
- Konteh, R. (2004) – The Role of Civil Society in Peace and Development (AFRICAN REGIONAL PEACE EXCHANGE, Vol. 1, No. 2, October 2004).
- Konteh, R. (2005) - RESPONDING TO CONFLICTS: The role of civil society in West Africa (Accepted for publication by UN University for Peace).
- Aiah A. Gbakima, Konteh, R. et al. (2005) - Nutritional Status of Children in Displacement Camps in Sierra Leone (Submitted for publication).
- Aiah A. Gbakima, Konteh, R. et al. (2007) - Intestinal Protozoa and Intestinal Helminthic Infections in Displacement Camps in Sierra Leone (AFRICAN JOURNAL OF MEDICINE AND MEDICAL SCIENCES (2007) 36, 1–9.)
