= Mohamed Sillah =

Sierra Leonean politician (born 1949)

Mohamed Yahya Sillah (born December 12, 1949) is a Sierra Leonean politician, journalist and human rights activist. He was active in the transition efforts from military to civilian rule in Sierra Leone. As the National Chairman of the National Alliance Democratic Party (NADP), he was an unsuccessful candidate in the 1996 Presidential elections.

== Early life ==
Sillah was born on December 12, 1949, in Massam Kpaka, Pujehun District, British Sierra Leone to Acting Paramount Chief Alhaji Yahya Sillah of Dama Chiefdom, Kenema District and Haja Mamie Zoe Mansaray.

== Career ==
=== Journalism ===
Mohamed Yahya Sillah started his career in journalism in 1978 as Senior Reporter with the Liberian News Agency (LINA), Ministry of Information and Broadcasting in Monrovia, Liberia. He became Managing Editor of Third World News at the Atlanta Voice Newspaper, Atlanta, Georgia, US in 1981. In 1983, he founded the African World News magazine in Atlanta, Georgia.

=== First Liberian Civil War ===
In 1990, Sillah traveled to Liberia to cover the First Liberian Civil War for African World News. He reported about rebels drinking human blood from freshly slaughtered civilians.

==== Hunger relief efforts ====
Thousands of Sierra Leoneans were stranded in Liberia during the war. The Sierra Leone embassy in Monrovia closed and the Sierra Leone government under president Joseph Saidu Momoh (APC) declared its inability to rescue the stranded Sierra Leoneans. He worked with other concerned Sierra Leonean refugees to take charge at the embassy. Sillah negotiated with the rebels to sell bags of rice that he purchased and distributed for free to all refugees at the embassy.

==== Evacuation ====
As the assault on the embassy intensified, Sillah undertook to rescue those stranded in the embassy and convey them to safety at Monrovia's free port facility. He did so by paying combatant factions with his own money to facilitate passage through ambush points along the way. He succeeded evacuating all the refugees with the help of ECOMOG soldiers less than an hour before a rebel missile destroyed the embassy. At the Monrovia Freeport, Sillah formed the Sierra Leone Evacuation Organization.

He aided in the successful evacuation of approximately 5000 people to Freetown over a period of 90 days via the Nigerian gunboat known as The Ambe, earning him the nickname 'Junior Moses'.

=== National Alliance Democratic Party ===
The leadership ability Sillah demonstrated attracted the attention of American diplomats in Monrovia, Liberia. He entered politics in 1995 and became the Party Leader and National Chairman of the National Alliance Democratic Party (NADP). He also began his campaign for the Sierra Leone presidency the same year.

==== 1996 presidential campaign ====
Sillah ran as the NADP candidate in the 1996 Presidential elections. He received 0.5% of the votes (3,723 total votes). He contested the election results on BBC's Focus on Africa.

=== Activism against deportation of Sierra Leoneans in the US ===
In 2004, Sillah opposed the deportation of Sierra Leoneans from the United States after the US withdrew their protective privilege known as Temporary protected status (TPS). He made an appeal to the US government on their behalf.

Sillah won the support of Georgia Congressman John Lewis, who sent a request to the Secretary of Homeland Security urging them to reconsider the TPS issue, which led to a reprieve for the refugees.

=== Support for Paul Kamara ===
In 2004, as NADP leader Sillah protested the imprisonment of Sierra Leonean journalist, Paul Kamara, editor of For Di People Newspaper. Sillah viewed Kamara's imprisonment and the subsequent banning of his newspaper as a breach of the SLPP government’s commitment to freedom of the press and the constitutional exercise of free speech.

He criticized President Ahmad Tejan Kabbah for allowing the imprisonment of Kamara and held that the exercise of democracy and the protection of human rights were fundamental to people's right to free speech.

=== 2007 Presidential and Parliamentary elections ===
In 2007 Sillah withdrew his bid for national leadership in the Presidential and Parliamentary elections, citing inadequate funding and ineffective campaign management. He supported the Sierra Leone People's Party (SLPP) presidential candidate, Vice President Solomon Berewa, who lost the election.

Sillah congratulated the winning candidate, Ernest Bai Koroma of the All People's Congress (APC) party. He vowed to respect any Sierra Leonean who was legitimately and democratically elected to office.
