= Kargbo =

Kargbo is a surname. Notable people with the surname include:

- Abu-Bakarr Kargbo (born 1992), Sierra Leonean football player
- Augustus Kargbo (born 1999), Sierra Leonean football player
- Edward Kargbo (born 1963), Sierra Leonean politician
- Hamzad Kargbo (born 2002), English footballer
- Ibrahim Ben Kargbo (born 1944), Sierra Leonean journalist and politician
- Ibrahim Kargbo (born 1982), Sierra Leonean football player
- Ibrahim Kargbo Jr. (born 2000), Sierra Leonean football player
- Karefa Kargbo, Sierra Leonean politician
- Mariatu Kargbo (born 1985), Sierra Leonean beauty pageant contestant
- Michaela Kargbo (born 1991), Sierra Leonean sprinter
- Momodu Kargbo, Sierra Leonean politician and economist
- Saidu Kargbo (born 1982), Sierra Leone boxer
- Samuel Kargbo (born 1974), Gambian football player
- Sidney Kargbo (born 1986), Sierra Leonean football player
