= Jacob Jusu Saffa =

Sierra Leonean politician

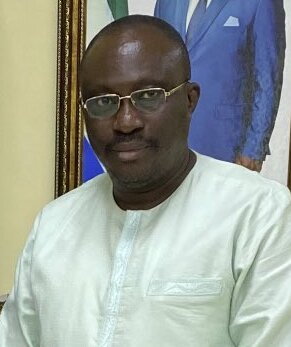
- Saffa in 2021

Chief Minister of Sierra Leone
- In office 30 April 2021 – 10 July 2023
- President: Julius Maada Bio
- Preceded by: David J. Francis
- Succeeded by: David Moinina Sengeh

Minister of Finance
- In office 12 April 2018 – 12 May 2021
- President: Julius Maada Bio
- Preceded by: Momodu Kargbo
- Succeeded by: Dennis Vandi

Personal details
- Party: Sierra Leone People's Party (SLPP)
- Education: Institute for Economic Development and Planning; Fourah Bay College
- Website: statehouse.gov.sl

Jacob Jusu Saffa is a Sierra Leonean politician who served as Chief Minister of Sierra Leone from 30 April 2021 to 10 July 2023.

Saffa holds a Bachelor of Science (honours) degree in economics from Fourah Bay College, University of Sierra Leone and a Master of Arts degree in Economic Development and Planning from the Institute for Economic Development and Planning (IDEP) of the United Nations Economic Commission for Africa in Dakar, Senegal.

From 2005 to 2011, Saffa was the National Secretary General of the Sierra Leone People's Party.

From 2018 until his appointment as Chief Minister in 2021, Saffa was Minister of Finance. During Saffa's tenure, Patricia Nyanga Laverley served as the Deputy Minister of Finance, representing Moyamba and Bonthe Districts, from June 2018–July 2021.

== Other activities ==
- African Development Bank (AfDB), Ex-Officio Member of the Board of Governors (since 2018)
- ECOWAS Bank for Investment and Development (EBID), Ex-Officio Member of the Board of Governors (since 2018)

Political offices
Preceded by David J. Francis	Chief Minister of Sierra Leone; 2021–2023	Succeeded by David Moinina Sengeh
Preceded by Momodu Kargbo	Minister of Finance; 2018–2021	Succeeded by Dennis Vandi
