= Abdul Kady Karim =

Sierra Leonean politician (died 2014)

United National People's Party nominee for President of Sierra Leone
- Election date 11 August 2007
- Opponents: Solomon Berewa; Ernest Bai Koroma; Charles Margai; Kandeh Baba Conteh; Amadu Jalloh; Andrew Turay
- Incumbent: Ahmad Tejan Kabbah

Personal details
- Died: November 2014 Maryland, U.S.
- Party: United National People's Party

Abdul Kady Karim (died 12 or 13 November 2014) was a Sierra Leonean politician, accountant and academic. He was a member of the United National People's Party (UNPP). He ran for President in Sierra Leone's August 2007 general election and finished in 7th place with 7,260 votes (.39 percent of total votes) nationally.

== Life and career ==
He joined the UNPP as a member in 2001. He was elected leader of the party in 2006 at its convention in Freetown. Upon election he stated "It will not be easy to reverse these ills that the APC and the SLPP have afflicted on this nation, but we can do it together, it will require an equality of sacrifice not a sacrifice of equality."

He resigned as a leader from the party in 2010; in 2012 it was necessary for him to deny the accuracy of a press report indicating that he was still chairman and leader of the UNPP.

He died in Maryland, in the United States, in November 2014; his death may have related to knee surgery he underwent several months before. It was noted that "The late professor acted as head of many family homes within his family circles who depended on him for their livelihood."

An obituary stated: "The late Professor is a father whose determination was to serve his country of birth by creating jobs and change the political landscape by joining the political race."

== Education ==
Karim, an accountant by trade, was educated at George Washington University. He has taught his trade at Bowie State University, Southeastern University, and Strayer University, the last being his occupation at the time of the 2007 presidential election.

== Family ==
Karim had 6 children, which were evenly split between Sierra Leone and the United States. His wife was currently employed by the United States State Department in the Voice of America - Africa.
