= Abu Kamara =

Abu Kamara may refer to:

- Abu Bakar Kamara (born 1929), Sierra Leonean politician
- Abu Kamara (footballer, born 1997), Liberian football forward for Kuching FA
- Abu Kamara (footballer, born 2003), English football forward for Hull City
