= Kaifala Marah =

Sierra Leonean politician and accountant

Minister of Finance of Sierra Leone
- In office January 2013 – March 2016
- Preceded by: Samura Kamara
- Succeeded by: Momodu Kargbo

State House Chief of Staff to president Ernest Bai Koroma
- In office 2010–2012
- Succeeded by: Richard Konteh

Personal details
- Born: Koidu Town, Kono District, Sierra Leone
- Education: Fourah Bay College; University at Albany (State University of New York); University of Hull
- Profession: Accountant

Kaifala Marah (born in Koidu Town, Sierra Leone) is a Sierra Leonean politician, accountant, Governor of the Bank of Sierra Leone (2016–2017), and Minister of Finance (2013–2016). On 7 March 2017, Dr. Marah resigned as governor to seek the nomination of the All People's Congress (APC) for the presidential election of 2018.

He served as State House chief of staff and senior economic advisor to Sierra Leone's president Ernest Bai Koroma from 2010 until his appointment as finance minister in 2013.

Marah served as a deputy town clerk at the Koidu-New Sembehun city council. He later served as a budget analyst at the New York State Senate. Marah was the public expenditure management adviser at the commonwealth secretariat in London, before he was appointed as chief of staff to president Ernest Bai Koroma.

Marah was born and raised in Koidu Town, Kono District, in Eastern Sierra Leone. His family is originally from Koinadugu District in Northern Sierra Leone. Marah is a Muslim and a member of the Kuranko ethnic group.

== Early life and education ==
Kaifala Marah was born and raised in Koidu Town, Kono District, in the Eastern province of Sierra Leone to Kuranko parents from Koinadugu District in the north of Sierra Leone.

Marah attended Ansarul Islamic Boys Secondary School in Koidu Town. Marah holds a bachelor's degree in international relations from Fourah Bay College in Sierra Leone; a master's degree in public policy from the University at Albany of the State University of New York; and a doctorate degree in political finance (political economy) from the University of Hull.

== Career ==
Marah had served as a deputy town clerk at the Koidu-New Sembehun city council. He later served as a budget analyst at the New York State Senate. Marah was the public expenditure management adviser at the commonwealth secretariat in London, before he was appointed as chief of staff to president Ernest Bai Koroma.

== Political career ==
Marah was appointed by Sierra Leone's president Ernest Bai Koroma to serve as his chief of staff and senior economic advisor from 2010 up until December 2012, when president Koroma moved him to become Minister of Finance of Sierra Leone.

=== SLPP's commission of inquiry ===
In 2018, immediately after taking office, President Julius Maada Bio’s administration announced a Commissions of Inquiry (COI) approved to look into the performance of former All People's Congress (APC) government officials and that the scope of the inquiry will cover the period November 2007 to April 2018. Over 300 persons who served in senior positions in the former Koroma administration, including Kaifala Marah, were indicted. Justice John Rosolu Bankole Thompson, who headed Commission Number 2 of the three Commissions of Inquiry, blasted the Bio regime for misusing the COI in a manner that was "not reasonable or permissible" and also "not cognizable" under the COI legal framework that President Bio had sent for approval to Parliament.

=== APC party leadership campaign ===
In 2020 it was announced that the All People's Congress (APC) would hold their convention to elect a new leader that will challenge president Julius Maada Bio of the SLPP who is facing re-election for a second five-year term in 2023. Marah, a former Minister of Finance and a former Chief Minister (Chief of Staff to the President) announced his candidacy for the leadership of the All People's Congress (APC) ahead of the 2023 Sierra Leone presidential and parliamentary elections. He is one of seven candidates for the APC leadership.

Marah is a clear underdog to the previous APC leader Samura Kamara who became leader in 2018 by selection by then outgoing president and APC party chairman Ernest Koroma, instead of election – a move that was unpopular with the majority of APC supporters[9]. APC ultimately lost the elections to the SLPP[10].
