= Andrew Lungay =

Sierra Leonean politician

Member of Parliament of Sierra Leone from Kailahun District
- In office 2002–present

Personal details
- Born: May 16, 1942 (age 83) Kenema District, British Sierra Leone
- Party: All People's Congress (APC)

Andrew Victor Lungay (born May 16, 1942) is a Sierra Leonean politician from the Sierra Leone People's Party (SLPP). He is a member of parliament of Sierra Leone from Kenema District since 2002.

Lungay ran in the 1996 presidential election as a member of the Social Democratic Party, receiving .7% of the national vote. An interesting note on that election is Lungay and Andrew Turay, the 2 worst finishers in the election, had equal numbers of votes from all the regions, something the top-finishers could not claim. Lungay has been a member of the Parliamentary Education, Social Services, Youths & Sports, Human Rights and Internal Affairs committees.
