= Sierra Leone–Timor-Leste relations =

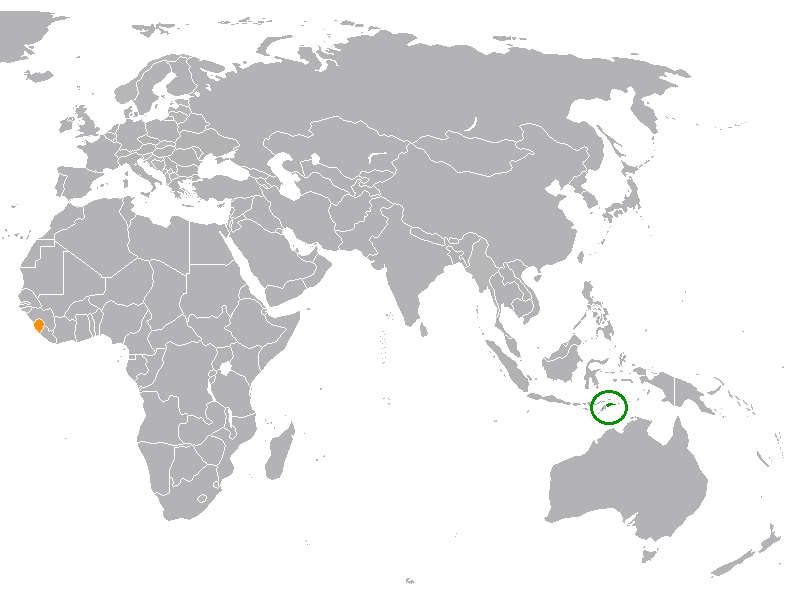

- Timor-Leste: Sierra Leone

Sierra Leone–Timor-Leste relations refers to the current and historical relationship between Sierra Leone and Timor-Leste.

== Political relations ==
- 2002 - UN missions in East Timor & Sierra Leone launch campaigns for the International Day for the Elimination of Violence Against Women.
- 2015 - H.E. Dr. Kaifala Marah, Chair of g7+, visits Timor-Leste to strengthen political support for g7+.
- 2015 - Dr. Kaifala Marah meets with PM H.E. Dr. Rui Araujo, reaffirming Timor-Leste’s support for g7+.
- 2015 - Dr. Kaifala Marah meets H.E. Xanana Gusmão, who pledges continued support for g7+ peace and reconciliation efforts.
- 2015 - Kay Rala Xanana Gusmão attends UN General Assembly meetings. He shares Timor-Leste’s development experiences, including insights from Africa and Sierra Leone.
- 2022 - H.E. Francis Kai-Kai visits Timor-Leste as the Chair of g7+ and meets multiple national leaders.
- 2022 - Francis Kai-Kai meets the President of the National Parliament of Timor-Leste, Dr. Aniceto Guterres, discussing democracy and the g7+ Parliamentary Assembly.
- 2022 - Francis Kai-Kai meets the Minister of Foreign Affairs and Cooperation of Timor-Leste, Adaljiza Magno, to strengthen the g7+ platform.
- 2026 - On April 14, a high-level virtual meeting of Eminent Persons of the g7+ resulted in an agreement to establish formal diplomatic relations between Sierra Leone and Timor-Leste, reflecting a shared commitment to deepening South-South cooperation and expanding collaboration in areas such as governance reform, peacebuilding, and youth empowerment.

== Economic relations ==
- 2002 - UN Population Fund (UNFPA) supports Timor-Leste’s campaign against gender violence.
- 2015 - Dr. Kaifala Marah visits the National Petroleum Authority to exchange knowledge on natural resource management.
- 2022 - Ambassador Rui Carreira highlights Timor-Leste’s WTO accession progress, its and strong national support.
- 2022 - Timor-Leste and Sierra Leone plan a high-level side summit at the 76th UN General Assembly to advance g7+ advocacy for peace and statebuilding.

== Military relations ==
- 2022 - The g7+ discuss the role of conflict-affected countries in strengthening peace and security cooperation. The President of the National Parliament of Timor-Leste raises Afghanistan’s situation, urging g7+ attention.

== Cultural relations ==
- 2002 - Sierra Leone’s 16-day campaign against gender violence includes radio call-in shows focusing on rural, disabled, and uprooted women.
- 2002 - Timor-Leste organizes debates, film screenings, and distributes educational materials on gender violence.
- 2002 - Churches, NGOs, and women's groups participate in awareness events in Dili, Timor-Leste.
- 2010 - Holly L. Guthrey writes a thesis on Women's Participation in Transitional Justice Mechanisms, concluding that women's participation in transitional justice in Timor Leste and Sierra Leone is influenced by gender-specific mandates.
- 2015 - Dr. Kaifala Marah acknowledges Timor-Leste’s assistance to Guinea, Liberia, and Sierra Leone in combating Ebola.
- 2022 - Francis Kai-Kai attends Timor-Leste’s 20th Anniversary of the Restoration of Independence and Presidential Swearing-in Ceremony.
- 2022 - Francis Kai-Kai meets Centro Nacional Chega to discuss integrating the Chega Report into the education curriculum for historical awareness.
- 2022 - Francis Kai-Kai meets the President of National Election Commission of Timor-Leste to discuss election observation and cooperation among g7+ members.
