= 1977 Sierra Leonean parliamentary election =

Parliamentary election of Sierra Leone in 1977

Parliamentary elections were held in Sierra Leone on 6 May 1977. They were the last multi-party elections held in the country until 1996.

== Background ==
Elections were called ahead of schedule by president Siaka Stevens following his declaration of a state of emergency after student riots earlier in the year.

In the election itself, only 41 of the directly elected and one of the indirectly elected paramount chief seats were contested (in the remaining 36 directly elected and 11 indirectly elected seats, the All People's Congress was the only party with a candidate). In a campaign marred by violence, elections in eight constituencies were not held on the day of the election, but were contested at a later date.

For the first time, there were also three presidential appointees in the parliament.

== Results ==
Party	Votes	%	Seats	+/–
All People's Congress	425,358	61.93	70	–14
Sierra Leone People's Party	205,976	29.99	15	New
Democratic National Party	478	0.07	0	New
Independents	54,998	8.01	0	–1
Paramount chiefs			12	0
Presidential appointees			3	New
Total	686,810	100.00	100	+3
Source: IPU

== Aftermath ==
The following year, a referendum approved a new constitution that made the country a one-party state with the APC as the sole legal party. Elections were held under this system in 1982, 1985 and 1986. Another referendum in 1991 returned the country to multi-party politics, and the next pluriform elections were held in 1996.
