= J. B. Dauda =

Sierra Leonean politician (1942–2017)

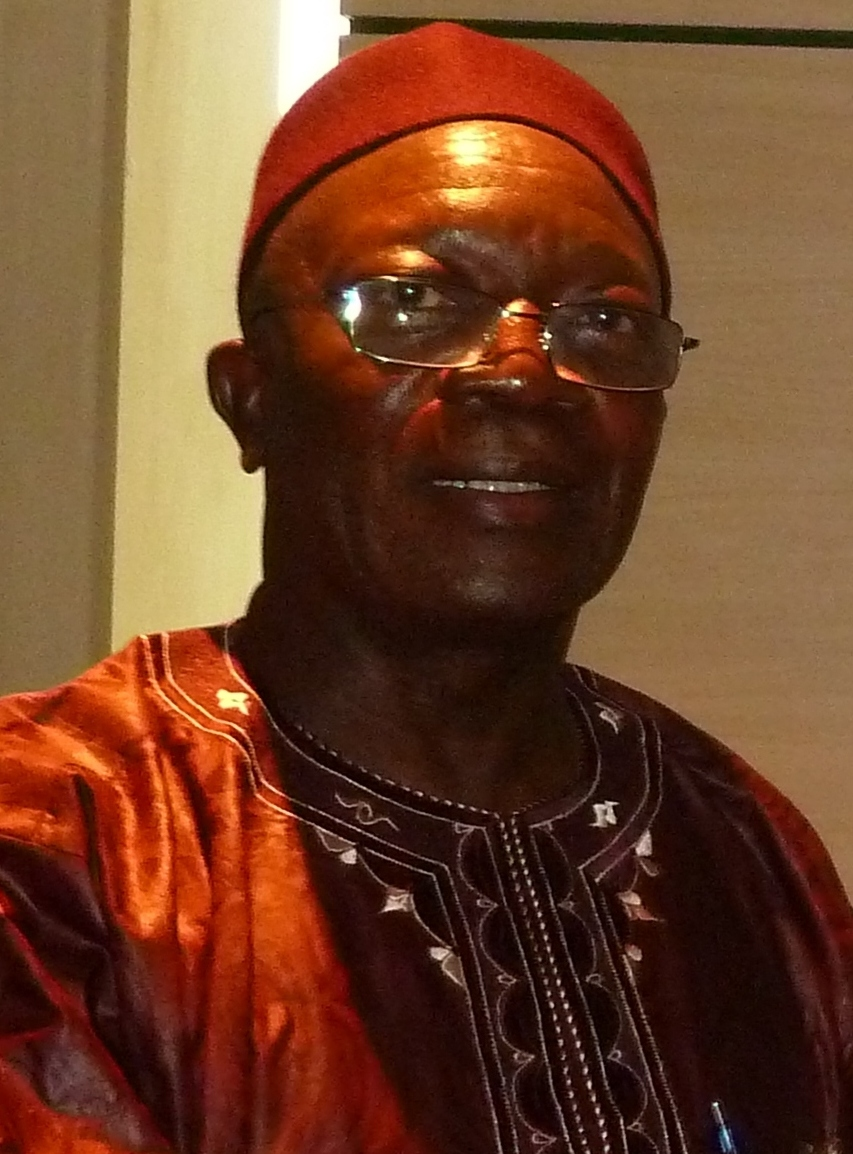

Minister of Foreign Affairs of Sierra Leone
- In office December 2010 – 2012
- President: Ernest Bai Koroma
- Deputy: Ebun Jusu
- Preceded by: Zainab Hawa Bangura
- Succeeded by: Samura Kamara

Second Vice-President of Sierra Leone
- In office November 1991 – 29 April 1992
- President: Joseph Saidu Momoh
- Preceded by: Salia Jusu-Sheriff
- Succeeded by: Albert Joe Demby (As Vice President)

Members of the Parliament of Sierra Leone for Kenema
- In office 1986–1992

Personal details
- Born: Joseph Bandabla Dauda; 24 December 1942 Kenema District, British Sierra Leone
- Died: 1 June 2017 (aged 74) Accra, Ghana
- Party: All People's Congress (APC), Sierra Leone People's Party (SLPP)
- Education: Fourah Bay College; King's College London
- Profession: Economist

Joseph Bandabla Dauda (24 December 1942 – 1 June 2017) widely known as J. B. Dauda, was a Sierra Leonean politician. He was Second Vice-President of Sierra Leone, Attorney-General and Minister of Justice from November 1991 to April 1992. Later he was Minister of Finance in 2002, Minister of Foreign Affairs from 2010 to 2012, and Minister of Internal Affairs from 2013 to 2016.

== Education ==
Dauda attended Fourah Bay College for undergraduate studies and earned a degree with honors in history from 1964 to 1967. He then moved to King's College London of the University of London from 1968 to 1969, where he also studied history.

== Politics ==
From 1972 to 1986, Dauda was engaged in a private legal practice. In the 1986 election, Dauda was elected to Parliament from Kenema, where he served until 1992. From April 1987 to 1988, he was Minister of State in the Office of the Attorney-General and Minister of Justice, and from November 1988 to September 1991 he was Minister of Trade. He then served as Second Vice-President, Attorney-General and Minister of Justice from November 1991 to April 1992, at which point the government was overthrown in a military coup led by Valentine Strasser. Dauda returned to politics under President Ahmed Tejan Kabbah in 1999 as the Minister of Rural Development and Local Government, where he remained until June 2002, when he became Minister of Finance of Sierra Leone.

Dauda sought the leadership of the ruling Sierra Leone People's Party (SLPP) at its national convention in Makeni on September 3–4, 2005. He took fourth place, with 28 votes, behind Vice-President Solomon Berewa, who won 291 votes, Charles Margai, who won 34 votes, and Julius Maada Bio, who won 33 votes. Shortly afterward, on September 6, he was replaced as Finance Minister by John Oponjo Benjamin.

== Death ==
Dauda died at a medical center in Accra, Ghana from an undisclosed long illness on the morning of 1 June 2017 at the age of 74.
