= Patricia Nyanga Laverley =

Sierra Leonean economist and politician

Minister of Finance
- In office 4 June 2018 – 30 July 2021
- President: Julius Maada Bio
- Preceded by: Patrick Conteh; Richard Konteh; Momodu Kargbo
- Succeeded by: Sheku Ahmed Fantamadi Bangura

Personal details
- Born: Freetown, Sierra Leone
- Party: Sierra Leone People's Party (SLPP)
- Children: 1
- Education: University of Sierra Leone; American University, Washington, D.C., USA
- Website: www.patricia-laverley.com

Patricia Nyanga Laverley is a Sierra Leonean economist and politician. She served as the Deputy Minister of Finance representing Moyamba and Bonthe Districts from 2018–2021. On 12 April 2018, President Julius Maada Bio appointed her as the Deputy Minister of Finance. Before this appointment, she served in various professional and managerial roles at the African Development Bank Group, HSBC, World Bank Group, International Monetary Fund, and Amnesty International.

== Background and education ==
Patricia Laverley was born in Freetown, Sierra Leone. She holds a Bachelor of Arts degree in International Development (Financial Economics) and a Master's degree in Public Administration (Financial Economics), both from the American University, Washington, D.C. She also holds a Doctorate in Business Administration (Financial Economics) from the American University, London.

== Career ==
Before joining Sierra Leonean politics, Patricia Laverley worked as a Principal Macroeconomist and Public Financial Management Specialist at the Economic Governance Coordination Unit at the African Development Bank Group, after serving in different professional and managerial positions at the World Bank Group, International Monetary Fund, HSBC, and Amnesty International.

In 2018, Patricia Laverley successfully led the policy dialogue on the restoration of the IMF program with the Government of Sierra Leone.

She also led the Parliamentary ratification of all financial legislative instruments from 2018–2021. Over 60 financial legislative instruments were approved by the House of Parliament, including the National Budget for three consecutive years (2018, 2019, and 2020), and the Banking Act of Sierra Leone (2019).

From 2018–2021, she managed Sierra Leone's Public Financial Management Reform Strategy and Action Plan, which focused on policy measures undertaken by the Ministry of Finance.

== Personal life ==
Patricia Laverley has one son. She also speaks English and French fluently.

== See also ==
- Ministry of Finance (Sierra Leone)
- Cabinet of Sierra Leone
- African Development Bank Group
