= Sawula =

Village in Pujehun District in the Southern Province of Sierra Leone

Sawula is a village in Pujehun District in the Southern Province of Sierra Leone. It is the birthplace of Francis Minah, the second vice-president of Sierra Leone.

It comes from a mendelised phonetic for "Swaray-lah" which means the town/settlement of the Swaray clan a prominent madingo group that started the village. It was close to Massa-a-lah which was founded by the Mansaray clan who claim descendancy from the Keita clan (rulers of ancient Mali empire).
