= 2007 Sierra Leonean general election =

- Presidential election
- 11 August 2007 (first round); 8 September 2007 (second round)
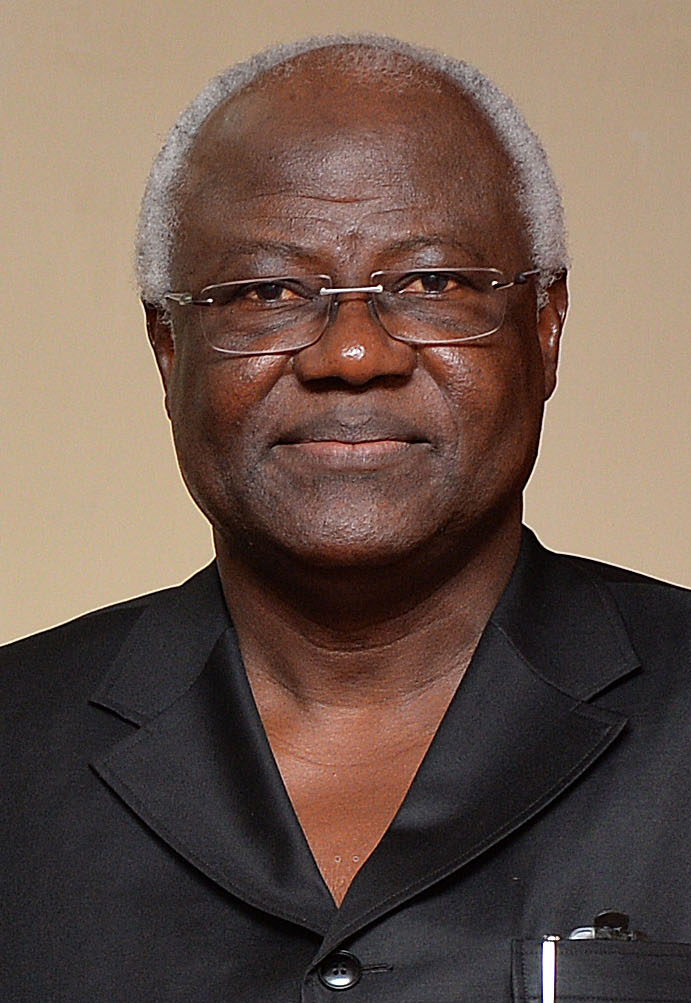

Nominee	Ernest Bai Koroma	Solomon Berewa
Party	APC	SLPP
Popular vote	950,407	789,651
Percentage	54.62%	45.38%
- Results by district Koroma: 60-70% 70-80% 80-90% Berewa: 50-60% 60-70% 70-80% 80-90% >90%
President before election
Ahmad Tejan Kabbah
SLPP
Elected President
Ernest Bai Koroma
APC
- Parliamentary election
- 11 August 2007
- 112 of the 124 seats in Parliament
Party	Leader	Vote %	Seats	+/–
APC	Ernest Bai Koroma	40.73	59	+32
SLPP	Momodu Koroma	39.54	43	−40
PMDC	Charles Margai	15.39	10	New
This lists parties that won seats. See the complete results below.
Results by constituency

General elections were held in Sierra Leone on 11 August 2007. Seven candidates competed in the first round of the presidential election; no candidate received the necessary 55% of the vote to win in the first round, and a second round was held between the top two candidates, Ernest Bai Koroma of the All People's Congress (APC) and Solomon Berewa of the Sierra Leone People's Party (SLPP), on 8 September. According to official results, Koroma won the election with 54.6% of the vote.

566 candidates stood in the parliamentary election, in which 112 seats, out of a total of 124, were at stake. Voting for seats in parliament was done on a first-past-the-post constituency basis, rather than the system of proportional representation used previously. 12 members of parliament were chosen by traditional chiefs, who have been considered to be allied with the SLPP, in a separate election. The election was described as "free and fair" and "orderly" by international observers.

== Background ==
Vice-President Solomon Berewa was chosen as the presidential candidate of the ruling SLPP, as well as the party's leader, in early September 2005. The incumbent president, Ahmed Tejan Kabbah of the SLPP, was prohibited from running again by term limits. On July 2, 2007, Foreign Minister Momodu Koroma was named as the party's vice-presidential candidate. Ernest Bai Koroma was nominated as the presidential candidate of the main opposition party APC, with Samuel Sam-Sumana as his vice-presidential candidate. Charles Margai was nominated as the presidential candidate of the People's Movement for Democratic Change (PMDC), with Ibrahim Tejan-Jalloh as his vice-presidential candidate. Margai formed the PMDC as a split from the SLPP in 2005, and this was seen as weakening the latter party. Prior to the election, Berewa, Koroma, and Margai were considered the main three presidential candidates.

In May 2007, the National Electoral Commission (NEC) delayed the election by two weeks from the previously set date of 28 July, saying that it was necessary to have additional time after parliament was dissolved in late June 2007. This decision was sharply criticized by the opposition, since it meant the election would be held when the rainy season was at its peak, potentially making voting difficult for many people. On 11 May, NEC Chairperson Christiana Thorpe rejected requests for the election to be delayed until December, saying that it would be unconstitutional to hold them so late. Acknowledging the impact the rain would likely have on voter turnout, Thorpe said that there would be more polling stations in order to make voting more convenient.

=== Campaigning ===
Campaigning for the election began on 10 July. The campaign was marred by some violence, but on 2 August an army spokesman described the country as "relatively calm and peaceful" and predicted a "peaceful, credible and violence-free" election. He also said that the army would not intervene in politics.

APC candidate Koroma was allegedly the target of an assassination attempt in the early hours of July 23, 2007, when, according to the APC, a group of armed men led by Tom Nyuma, who was a participant in the 1992 coup that ousted the APC, attempted to enter his hotel room in the southern city of Bo to kill him. In a letter to the Inspector General of Police in early August, Berewa alleged that the APC and the PMDC were planning to disrupt the election and intimidate SLPP supporters. He claimed that they planned to send their own supporters dressed in Operational Support Division uniforms to polling stations. APC Secretary-General Victor Foh accused the SLPP of planning electoral fraud.

== Election violence ==
Acts of violence escalated in the run up to the polls, especially in the capital, Freetown, and the south-eastern cities of Bo Kenema and Koidu Town. In July, police arrested scores of people after clashes in Bo between SLPP and PMDC supporters.

=== Election day and counts ===
There were about 2.6 million registered voters at the time of the election and 6,171 polling stations. Voting was reported to be peaceful, although in some places young people were said to have tried to disrupt vote counting, leading to increased security measures. An electoral commission official described the voting process as "smooth and successful". Turnout was reported to be high, despite the rains, with long lines at polling stations. Observers gave the election a positive appraisal and placed voter turnout at more than 70%. Marie-Anne Isler, head of the European Union observer mission, described voting as "well organized, positive and transparent", but also said that the SLPP enjoyed a strong advantage due to incumbency and the support of some traditional chiefs, and that it was "extremely dominant" in state television coverage. EU observers also said that Berewa appeared to have distributed money to voters at his home, a claim that the SLPP denounced as "baseless and unfounded".

Vote counting was done publicly at polling stations, with party representatives present. On August 13, Kabbah discouraged "provocative or inflammatory statements" and said that police would "deal firmly with any threats to the peace and stability of the nation". On the same day, NEC Chairperson Thorpe announced results from 7.4% of polling stations; out of these 150,374 votes, Koroma had 107,341 and Berewa had 33,041. Further results on August 14, from about 19% of polling stations, showed Koroma remaining well ahead of Berewa, with 204,774 votes against 106,487 for Berewa. Margai, in third place, had 43,904 votes. Meanwhile, United Nations Secretary-General Ban Ki-moon appealed for the preservation of "an atmosphere of calm and public order" and said that "any potential dispute" should be resolved "within the established legal channels".

On August 15, an APC spokesman claimed that, based on its own count, the party had won 61 seats in parliament, which would be a majority, although at the time official results for only four seats had been announced, two for the APC, one for the SLPP, and one for the PMDC. Partial results for the presidential election released by the National Electoral Commission on August 15, accounting for 34.3% of polling stations, showed Koroma still leading, although more narrowly; Koroma had 297,206 votes, compared to 227,353 for Berewa and 97,669 for Margai. Further results on August 16, accounting for 45.3% of polling stations, showed Koroma with 400,027 votes, Berewa with 310,321 votes, and Margai with 120,231 votes. Results from about 62% of polling stations on August 17 showed Koroma with 516,442 votes, Berewa with 421,812 votes, and Margai with 169,408 votes.

On August 18, results from 81% of polling stations showed Koroma with 44% of the vote and Berewa with 38%. On August 20, results from 93.1% of polling stations showed Koroma with 754,696 votes, Berewa with 654,756 votes, and Margai with 239,637 votes. In the parliamentary election, the APC had 21 seats, the SLPP had 10, and the PMDC had four. Turnout is placed at about 76%.

On August 19, Margai stated his support for Koroma in the second round of the election. On August 20, the PMDC's Karamoh Kabba explained what he said was the reasoning behind the decision: the PMDC sought to "ensure a more representative government, the survival of the PMDC as a political party and the creation of a third formidable political force for smooth running of democracy in Sierra Leone". According to Kabba, backing the APC would help to bridge the regional political divide marking Sierra Leone's politics (the SLPP and PMDC draw their main support from the south, while the APC draws its main support from the north), while backing the SLPP would deepen it; furthermore, he said that the APC had a natural reason to want the PMDC to survive, while the SLPP had a natural reason to want to destroy it. Margai's support for the APC provoked controversy in the PMDC, however, with some feeling that his decision was made without properly consulting the party.

SLPP spokesman Victor Reider expressed confidence for his party ahead of the second round, to be held in September, and said that the SLPP would warn voters about "the risk of destroying everything that we have been able to put together since 2002 when the war ended".

Full provisional results announced on August 23 showed Koroma with 815,523 votes (44.3%), Berewa with 704,012 votes (38.3%), and Margai with 255,499 votes (13.9%). Thorpe confirmed that a second round would be necessary between Koroma and Berewa. In the parliamentary election, the APC won 59 seats, the SLPP won 43 seats, and the PMDC won 10 seats. Turnout was placed at 75.8%.

Results by region reveal how Margai's PMDC party cut into the SLPP's support in the south and east. Especially significant was the PMDC's winning of 41% of the vote in the SLPP stronghold of Southern Province. In Northern Province, which has the largest voting population, the APC maintained its support and Koroma got almost 77% of the vote, the largest share by region for any of the candidates. The APC also received strong support in Western Area. Comparing the first-round performances of the SLPP and APC presidential candidates in 2002 and 2007 makes clear the SLPP's loss of ground in the south and east. While in 2002 the SLPP's candidate Kabbah won 92% and 95% in Eastern and Southern provinces, respectively, five years later the SLPP's candidate Berewa won just 66% and 46% there.

The SLPP's biggest losses were in the Western Area districts around Freetown. While the SLPP won more than half the seats in Western Area parliamentary elections in 2002, voters turned away from the SLPP in droves and the party lost all 21 seats in Western Area to the APC in 2007.

Margai said on August 24 that the APC and the PMDC would campaign together for the second round. Koroma's campaign called for Berewa to recognize defeat and back out of the second round in order to save the money that would have to be spent on it, but the SLPP refused to do so. Reider predicted victory for Berewa and said that the government should receive credit for being democratic and law-abiding, enabling the APC to win the parliamentary election.

On August 25, the NEC confirmed the provisional results, announced that the second round of the presidential election would take place on September 8, and said that second round campaigning would take place from August 25 until September 6.

The results were strongly marked by the regional divide between support for the APC, which won overwhelmingly in the north and also by a large margin in the west, and the SLPP, which won in the south and east, although it split its support there with the PMDC. The parties performed poorly outside of their regional support bases; the APC won only two of its 59 parliamentary seats outside of the north and west. Koroma received his best results in Bombali District (83.9%), Tonkolili District (82.2%), and Port Loko District (78.6%), while Berewa received his best results in Kailahun District (77.1%), Kenema District (63.0%), and Kono District (57.1%). Margai received a majority only in Bonthe District (61.1%).

Reider of the SLPP said that, despite "reservations over the conduct of the elections", his party accepted the results. The APC's Victor Foh said that his party accepted the results as well.

Foh alleged that a paramount chief in an eastern district had brought mercenaries from neighboring Guinea to intimidate voters by firing near polling stations.

Two small parties, the National Democratic Alliance (NDA) and the Peace and Liberation Party (PLP), respectively led by Amadu Jalloh, the fifth place presidential candidate, and Kandeh Baba Conteh, the sixth place candidate, announced their support for Berewa in a press conference on August 27. Fourth place candidate Andrew Turay of the Convention People's Party (CPP) also announced his support for Berewa in early September.

After clashes between supporters of the two sides in Freetown and Koidu Town, President Kabbah on August 27 warned that he would declare a state of emergency "if the current state of intimidation, molestation and violent acts is not stopped". A curfew was imposed in Koidu. In an interview with Voice of America, Reider claimed that Berewa had actually received 20,000 more votes than Koroma and that there were irregularities, particularly in the north and west, regarding which he said the SLPP had requested an investigation from the NEC. He also blamed the violence on the APC. Clashes were reported in Segbwema, in the south, on August 30, after SLPP supporters pelted an APC convoy with rocks; the local SLPP headquarters was burned. The violence led Koroma to end his campaigning in the south. Clashes erupted in Freetown on September 1 and reportedly left dozens of people injured; police intervened with tear gas. On the same day, Koroma and Berewa agreed to hold a peace march on September 3 in hopes of deescalating the violence. The two candidates also agreed to allow the police to handle their security, instead of entrusting it to private bodyguards.

Voter awareness of the concept of a second round and the need for it is said to be low, and it is speculated that voter turnout may be lower in the second round as a result. The NEC has been working to inform voters about the importance of the second round.

The peace march agreed to by Berewa and Koroma was eventually held on September 6, but it was boycotted by Koroma. The APC said that the SLPP had not corrected the problems that it said led to the previous violence and alleged that its supporters were being harassed that the Kamajor militia, active during the civil war, was being rearmed. Berewa made an appearance, but he did not participate in the actual march.

In the election on September 8, the parties traded accusations of harassment of their polling agents at polling stations. Berewa alleged that police mistreated SLPP agents and the SLPP's Alhaji Jah said there were reports that between 40 and 50 of his party's agents "were harassed, intimidated and taken out of polling stations". For his part, Koroma alleged that APC representatives were being harassed and kept away from polling stations in Kailahun. He also said that five APC agents were attacked and kidnapped in Bo and that many people had voted twice in Kenema. Police imposed a curfew in Kailahun.

European Union observers gave a positive assessment of the day of the election. In a statement on September 10, UN Secretary-General Ban Ki-Moon praised the election as proceeding in a "generally orderly and peaceful atmosphere, in spite of the tensions and violence that marred the campaign period" and urged people to "exercise restraint".

As vote counting occurred, both the SLPP and the APC claimed to be ahead and both said that they would reject results from areas where their agents were allegedly not allowed access to polling stations. The SLPP's Reider said that in three districts in the north the party's agents were kept away from the polling stations, and that there were 50 polling stations where SLPP agents were not present; he alleged that SLPP agents were arrested for two hours and that people from the APC took advantage of this to stuff the ballot boxes. APC spokesman Alpha Kanu said that his party's agents had been unable to access polling stations in parts of Kailahun, Kenema, and Pujehun districts in the south.

The first official results, released by the NEC on September 10, showed Koroma well ahead with 64% of the vote against 36% for Berewa, based on results from slightly more than 20% of polling stations; however, officials said that these results came primarily from the west of the country, where the APC is stronger. Thorpe emphasized the importance of an "atmosphere of calm" while votes are counted and results are released. Koroma claimed victory, saying it was "not possible" for him to lose, but Reider of the SLPP accused him of "trying to steal victory" and said that according to the SLPP's figures, Berewa was in the lead. Reider was also strongly critical of a report from the EU's observers that alleged that the number of votes in parts of the south and east exceeded the number of registered voters there.

Results released on September 11, based on about 37% of polling stations, showed Koroma with about 60% of the vote and Berewa with about 40%. With 50.8% of the vote counted on 12 September, Koroma had about 58.5%; out of the country's 14 districts, Koroma and Berewa each led in seven of them. On the same day, Kabbah urged people to accept the final results when they are released, regardless of who is declared the winner.

Results released on September 13, with 76.1% of the vote counted, showed Koroma leading with 60.2% (859,144 votes) against 39.8% (567,449 votes) for Berewa. The APC's Alpha Kanu said that his party held an "unassailable lead" and was waiting for a concession from Berewa. The SLPP's Reider, however, said that his party was filing a court injunction to prevent the publication of any further results due to what he described as discrepancies in the results. There have been allegations that the NEC has withheld some results from the SLPP's support bases in the south and east, and on September 15 a protest outside NEC offices was broken up by police.

On September 17, 2007, the NEC said that Koroma had won the election with 54.6% of the vote to Berewa's 45.4%; Koroma had 950,407 votes and Berewa had 789,651. Results from a total of 477 polling stations were invalidated because there were more ballots than there were registered voters: 426 of these polling stations were in the pro-SLPP Southeast, while 45 were in the Northern Province and six were in the Western Area. This decision was taken by Thorpe and two of the four Regional Commissioners; the two remaining Regional Commissioners, representing the south and east, left in protest when Koroma was declared the winner. Berewa promptly conceded defeat. According to Kanu, both Kabbah and Berewa called Koroma and congratulated him. Although the SLPP's injunction was scheduled to be heard on the same day, a judge postponed it. The official results can be challenged within seven days of the official proclamation.

Koroma was sworn in as President at State House in Freetown on 17 September, the same day that the results were announced, at a ceremony attended by Berewa and Kabbah. Koroma said on this occasion: "Let us begin the process of healing the wounds that suddenly and unnecessarily appeared during the course of this political campaign. Let us endeavour to reconcile ourselves as one nation under God." Shortly afterward, the SLPP headquarters in Freetown was looted. Police intervened, using tear gas and firing into the air to end the looting; some looters were reported arrested and at least one person was reported killed.

The 124 members of parliament were sworn in on September 25. Justice Abel Stronge was elected as Speaker and the APC's Victor Chukuma Johnson was elected as Deputy Speaker. Edward Turay was chosen as Leader of the Majority Party, and Momoh Pujeh was chosen as Leader of the Minority Party.

Some in the SLPP have accused Kabbah of contributing to its defeat, alleging that he betrayed the party due to distrust and jealousy that he harbored towards Berewa.

== Results ==
=== President ===
Candidate	Running mate	Party	First round		Second round	
Candidate	Running mate	Party	Votes	%	Votes	%
Ernest Bai Koroma	Samuel Sam-Sumana	All People's Congress	815,523	44.34	950,407	54.62
Solomon Berewa	Momodu Koroma	Sierra Leone People's Party	704,012	38.28	789,651	45.38
Charles Margai	Ibrahim Tejan-Jalloh	People's Movement for Democratic Change	255,499	13.89		
Andrew Turay	Lansana K. Conteh	Convention People's Party	28,610	1.56		
Amadu Jalloh	Margaret B. Sidikie	National Democratic Alliance	17,748	0.96		
Kandeh Baba Conteh	Abu Tarawallie	Peace and Liberation Party	10,556	0.57		
Abdul Kady Karim	Sei Mohammad	United National People's Party	7,260	0.39		
Total			1,839,208	100.00	1,740,058	100.00
Valid votes			1,839,208	92.70	1,740,058	97.55
Invalid/blank votes			144,898	7.30	43,793	2.45
Total votes			1,984,106	100.00	1,783,851	100.00
Registered voters/turnout			2,619,397	75.75	2,619,397	68.10
Source: African Elections Database

=== Parliament ===
Party	Votes	%	Seats	+/–
All People's Congress	728,898	40.73	59	+32
Sierra Leone People's Party	707,608	39.54	43	–40
People's Movement for Democratic Change	275,435	15.39	10	New
National Democratic Alliance	31,388	1.75	0	New
Convention People's Party	15,303	0.86	0	New
United National People's Party	14,078	0.79	0	0
Peace and Liberation Party	6,752	0.38	0	–2
Independents	10,127	0.57	0	New
Paramount chiefs			12	0
Total	1,789,589	100.00	124	0
Valid votes	1,789,589	91.06		
Invalid/blank votes	175,606	8.94		
Total votes	1,965,195	100.00		
Registered voters/turnout	2,619,397	75.02		
Source: African Elections Database
