= Ministry of Finance (Sierra Leone) =

Government ministry of Sierra Leone

Sierra Leone Ministry of Finance
Agency overview
- Formed: 1961
- Jurisdiction: Government agency
- Headquarters: Freetown, Sierra Leone
- Agency executive: Sheku Ahmed Fantamadi Bangura, Minister of Finance
- Parent agency: Government of Sierra Leone

Sierra Leone Ministry of Finance is a ministerial department of the Government of Sierra Leone, and is in charge of managing the revenue and finances of the Sierra Leone government. The ministry implements the economic policies and is responsible for public financial management. The ministry advises the President of Sierra Leone on economic issues. The headquarters of the Sierra Leone Ministry Of Finance is located on George Street in Freetown, Sierra Leone.

The Ministry of Finance is headed by the Minister of Finance, who is appointed by the president of Sierra Leone, and must be confirmed by the Parliament of Sierra Leone before taking office. The current Sierra Leone Minister of Finance is Sheku Ahmed Fantamadi Bangura, who was previously Deputy Finance Minister. Since some days his brother has been double rank promoted to CDS in the Sierra Leone army. The President of Sierra Leone has the constitutional authority to fire the Minister of Finance at any time.

== Responsibilities ==
- The responsibilities of the Sierra Leone Ministry of Finance include:
- Manages the country's revenue and finances
- Implement the Sierra Leone Government economic policies and public finances
- Ensure efficient allocation of public resources to promote stable economic growth
- Advises the President and the Government of Sierra Leone on economic issues
- Collecting the Sierra Leone Government taxes
- Releases data about the country's economy
- Enforcing Tax laws
- Manages the country's debts
- Pay debts and loans of the government
- Pay government bills
- Allocating finances of departments within the Sierra Leone government
- Manages and supervises all national banks owned by the Sierra Leone Government
- Set up rules and regulations of all private banks in Sierra Leone
- Ensure the correct, timely and accurate payment of monthly salaries to the President of Sierra Leone, the Vice President of Sierra Leone and members of the Sierra Leone Parliament
- Receives money deposited in the Sierra Leone Government treasury
- Edit finances of departments of the Sierra Leone
- Print out paper bills and mint coins of the currency of Sierra Leone
- Gives approved financial loan from national banks owned by the Sierra Leone Government

== Ministers of Finance ==
- Mohammad Sanusi Mustapha, 1958–1962
- Albert Michael Margai, 1962–1964
- Robert Granville Ojumiri King, 1964–1967
- Andrew Juxon-Smith, 1967
- Shecku B. Daramy, 1967–1968
- Mohamed Sorie Forna, 1968–1970
- Christian Alusine Kamara-Taylor, 1971–1975
- Sorie Ibrahim Koroma, 1975–1977
- Abu Bakar Kamara, 1977–1978
- Francis Minah, 1978–1981
- Sama Banya, Jan 1981–Dec 1981
- Siaka Stevens, Dec 1981–1982
- Salia Jusu-Sheriff, May 1982–Sept 1984
- Abdulai Conteh, 1984–1985
- Joe Amara Bangali, 1985
- Sheka Kanu, 1985–1987
- Hassan Gbassay Kanu, 1987–1989
- Tommy Taylor-Morgan, 1989–1991
- James S. A. Funna, 1991–1992
- Jim Fornah, 1992–1993
- John Karimu, 1993–1996
- Samura Kamara, January 1996–March 1996
- Thaimu Bangura, March 1996–May 1997
- Joe Amara Bangali, May 1997 – 1998
- James O. C. Jonah, April 1998–February 2001
- Peter Jiwa Kuyembeh, February 2001–May 2002
- Joseph B. Dauda, May 2002–September 2002
- John Oponjo Benjamin, September 2002–September 2007
- David Carew, September 2007–February 2009
- Samura Kamara, February 2009–January 2013
- Kaifala Marah, January 2013–March 2016
- Momodu Kargbo, March 2016–April 2018
- Jacob Jusu Saffa, April 2018–May 2021. Patricia Nyanga Laverley served as the Deputy Minister of Finance, representing Moyamba and Bonthe Districts, from June 2018–July 2021.
- Dennis Vandi, May 2021–January 2023
- Sheku Ahmed Fantamadi Bangura, January 2023–present

== See also ==
- Bank of Sierra Leone
- Finance ministry
- Economy of Sierra Leone
- Politics of Sierra Leone
