= David Carew =

Sierra Leonean economist and politician

David Omashola Carew

Minister of Trade and Industry
- Incumbent
- Assumed office February 26, 2009
- President: Ernest Bai Koroma
- Preceded by: Ahmad Tejan Kabbah

Minister of Finance of Sierra Leone
- In office September 2007 – February 2009
- President: Ernest Bai Koroma
- Preceded by: John Oponjo Benjamin
- Succeeded by: Samura Kamara

Personal details
- Born: Freetown, Sierra Leone
- Party: non

David Omashola Carew (born January 1955 in Freetown) is a Sierra Leonean economist and politician. He is Sierra Leone's Minister of Trade and Industry. He had also served as Minister of Finance of Sierra Leone from September 2007 to February 2009.

== Education and career ==
Carew is married to a Creole and has two children.

== Cabinet positions ==
Carew was appointed as Minister of Finance of Sierra Leone under President Ernest Bai Koroma. It was announced on 28 February 2009 that he was being moved to the position of Minister of Trade and Industry.

David Carew has held the office of Minister of Trade and Industry in Sierra Leone since late April 2009.
