= Albert Academy =

Coordinates: 8.47652°N 13.22963°W

Location
- Berry Street; Freetown; Sierra Leone

Information
- Type: Public school
- Motto: Esse Quam Videri (Rather to be, than to seem)
- Religious affiliation: United Methodist Church
- Established: October 4, 1904; 122 years ago
- Founder: Ira Albert
- Gender: Boys and girls until the 6334 system, now it's purely For Boys
- Age: 10 to 20
- Enrolment: B.E.C.E and W.A.C.E

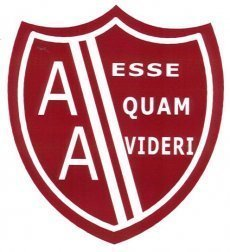
Albert Academy logo

The Albert Academy (AA) is a secondary school in Freetown, Sierra Leone.

The school's motto is Esse Quam Vederi (Rather to be than to Seem). It is situated at Berry Street in Freetown.

AA students have also been referred to as Okamory Boys due to the area in which the school is located in Freetown. However, the school has students from everywhere in Sierra Leone and it is not restricted to any tribe.

Although the school has a Christian tradition, the United Methodist Church, students from all religious background can attend. It has alumni associations in the UK, USA and Freetown. The alumni associations make contributions to the school including, for example, giving scholarships and grants to students.

== History ==
A girls' school had been established in the British colony of Sierra Leone in Moyamba in 1900, and it was decided to establish a similar boys' school. The UBC mission was responsible for finding land for the school, and originally proposed locating it in Shenge, the home of missionary Ira Albert. Eventually, however, the board decided that Shenge was too small, so they established the school in the colony's capital at Freetown.

The Albert Academy was founded on 4 October 1904, and was named after Ira Albert, who had recently been killed in a boating accident. When the academy was founded, it had just one teacher, a Mr L Turner, and four pupils. The first principal was Reverend Raymond P. Dougherty, with Edwin Hursh as vice principal. The original location was in Freetown's East Street.

In 1907, the academy relocated to its present location on Berry Street.

== Notable alumni ==
- Sir Milton Margai, led Sierra Leone to independence and became prime minister from 1961 to 1964
- Siaka Stevens, First President of Sierra Leone
- John Karefa-Smart, doctor and politician
- Abdulai Conteh, former Attorney General and Vice President
- Isaac Lebbie, Minister Of Information and Civic Education of Africa web, Africa Student Union President 2019/20, The First Legal Adviser to Information S.U Council, The First President of Elder council In West Africa Union,The Director of Child for Learn Book West Africa.
