= David J. Francis (politician) =

Sierra Leonean politician

The Honourable David J. Francis PhD
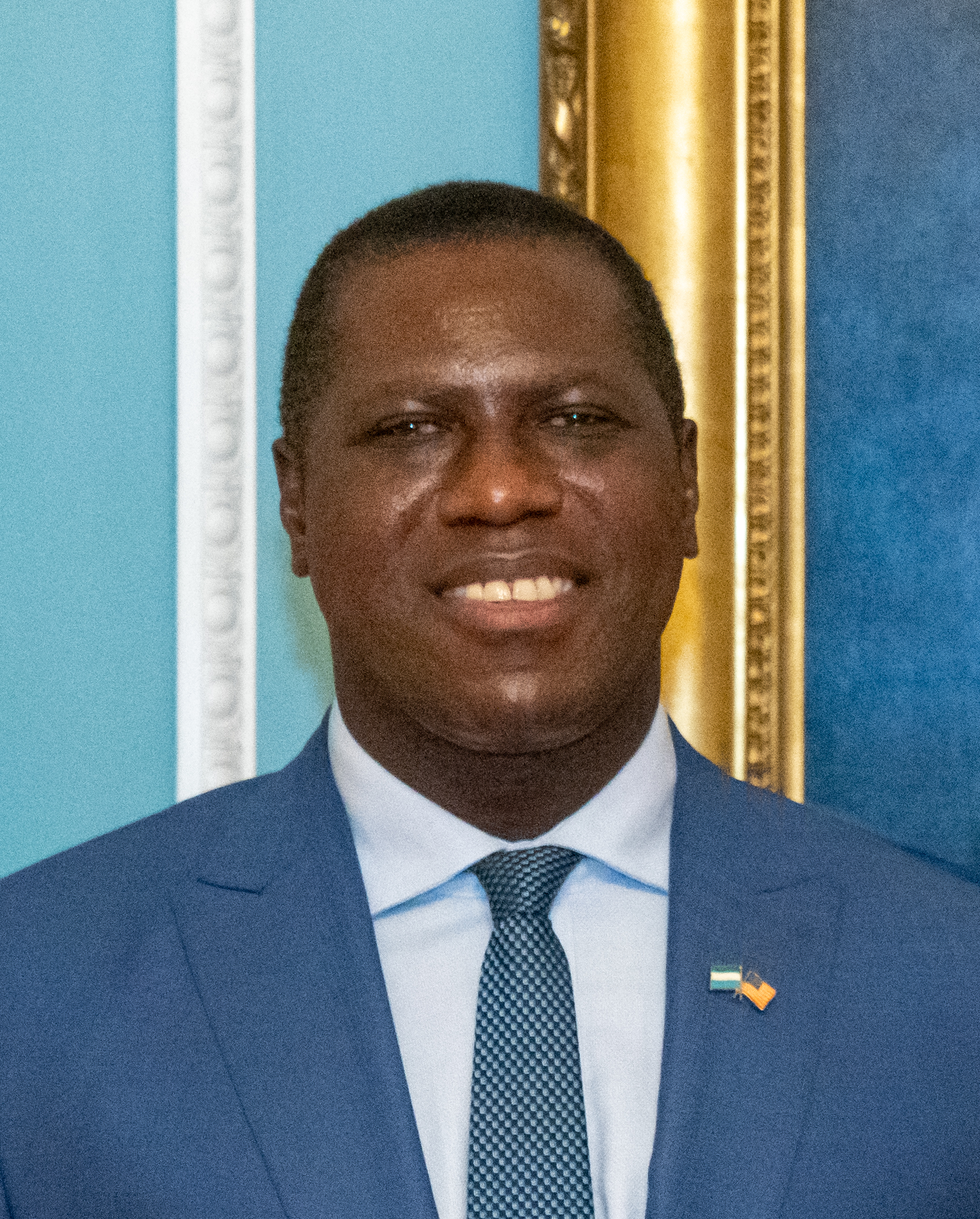
- David J. Francis, 2021

Foreign Minister of Sierra Leone
- In office 30 April 2021 – 10 July 2023
- President: Julius Maada Bio
- Succeeded by: Timothy Kabba

Chief Minister of Sierra Leone
- In office 20 April 2018 – 30 April 2021
- President: Julius Maada Bio
- Preceded by: None, position created
- Succeeded by: Jacob Jusu Saffa

Personal details
- Born: David John Francis; 5 October 1965 (age 60) Kenema, Sierra Leone
- Party: Sierra Leone People's Party (SLPP)
- Education: University of Southampton; International Institute of Social Studies; Raoul Wallenberg Institute of Human Rights and Humanitarian Law; Fourah Bay College; Holy Trinity Secondary School Kenema
- Profession: Educator
- Religion: Roman Catholicism

David John Francis (born 5 October 1965) is a Sierra Leonean politician, academic and author, who served as Chief Minister of Sierra Leone from April 2018 to April 2021. He is the first person to hold the office of Chief Minister since it was abolished in 1978. He is widely seen as the most highly influential government official in Sierra Leone, after the president and the vice president.

Francis studied at Fourah Bay College, Raoul Wallenberg Institute of Human Rights and Humanitarian Law and International Institute of Social Studies. From 1994 to 1998 he was a postdoctoral research associate at University of Southampton. Prior to his current position in the government of Sierra Leone, he was a professor at the University of Bradford where he was the coordinator of the UNESCO Chair in African Peace and Conflict Studies. He is the author of nine books and over fifty journal articles and commissioned-policy papers.

== Early life ==
Francis was born and raised in Kenema in Eastern Sierra Leone, and he is a member of the Mende ethnic group.

== Education ==
In 1993, he earned a Bachelor of Arts with Honours in History at Fourah Bay College, University of Sierra Leone, Sierra Leone. In 1994, he earned a master's degree in Human Rights at the Raoul Wallenberg Institute of Human Rights and Humanitarian Law and a second degree in 1995 in Diploma in Law, Development and Social Justice at the International Institute of Social Studies, The Hague, The Netherlands. In 1998, he received his doctorate in International Relations at the University of Southampton, in the United Kingdom.

== Career ==
Since 2015, Francis has been a member of the board of trustees and joined the Advocates Coalition for Development and Environment (ACODE). He was the Head of Department of Peace Studies & Director of the John & Elnora Ferguson Centre for African Studies (JEFCAS) at the University of Bradford. He was as Interim Vice Chancellor of the UNESCO-Affiliated African Peace University project in Sierra Leone.

Prior to his appointment as Chief Minister, he was appointed Chair of the Governance Transition team by President Julius Maada Bio.

He was a professor at the University of Bradford, where he was director of the Africa Centre for Peace and Conflict Studies and Personal Research Chair.

== Selected publications ==
- When War Ends in Africa: building peace in divided communities. Ashgate. May 2012 (edited)
- Policing in Africa. Palgrave /Macmillan, April 2012 (edited)
- National States and the Challenges of Regional Integration in West Africa. Paris. Karthala, December 2011 (ed.) (UNESCO – SHS MOST Project)
- US Strategy in Africa: AFRICOM, Terrorism and Security Challenges. Routledge, Feb. 2010 (Edited)
- Peace and Conflict in Africa (ed.) London: Zed Books, September 2008 (Translated into Arabic in May 2010 by the Egypt-based Arabic Translation Institute)
- Uniting Africa: Building Regional Security Systems, Aldershot. Ashgate January 2006
- Civil Militias: Africa’s Intractable Security Menace? (ed.) Aldershot. Ashgate, 2005
- Dangers of Co-deployment: UN Cooperative Peacekeeping in Africa. Aldershot. Ashgate, December 2004 (co-authored with Mohamed Faal, Alex Ramsbotham & John Kabia)
- The Politics of Economic Regionalism: Sierra Leone in ECOWAS, Aldershot. Ashgate, December 2001

== See also ==
- Chief Minister of Sierra Leone
- Government of Sierra Leone

Political offices
Preceded by Christian Alusine Kamara-Taylor (as Prime Minister)	Chief Minister of Sierra Leone; 2018–2021	Succeeded by Jacob Jusu Saffa
