= Convention People's Party (Sierra Leone) =

Political party in Sierra Leone

The Convention People's Party is a political party in Sierra Leone. In the August 2007 general election, the party did not win any seats in parliament, and its presidential candidate, Andrew Turay, won only 28,610 votes, 1.56% of the total.
