= Salia Jusu-Sheriff =

Sierra Leonean politician

Second Vice President of Sierra Leone
- In office 4 April 1987 – 1991
- President: Joseph Saidu Momoh
- Preceded by: Abu Bakar Kamara
- Succeeded by: J. B. Dauda

Personal details
- Born: 1 June 1929 Jojoima, Malema Chiefdom, Kailahun District, British Sierra Leone
- Died: 19 December 2009 (aged 80) London, United Kingdom
- Party: Sierra Leone People's Party (SLPP), All People's Congress (APC)
- Spouse: Gladys Jusu-Sheriff
- Children: Five children: Yasmin; Salia Junior; Nalinie; Sheku; Nadia

Salia Jusu-Sheriff (1 June 1929 – 19 December 2009) was a Sierra Leonean politician who served as Vice President of Sierra Leone from 1987 to 1991. He was the leader of the SLPP party.

== Life ==
Jusu-Sheriff was born in 1929 in Freetown. He was an economist and a lawyer. He was Minister of Finance of Sierra Leone from May 1982 to September 1984. Sierra Leone had two Vice Presidents, the First and Second, Jusu-Sheriff was the Second from 1987 to 1991. Jusu-Sheriff retired after Joseph Saidu Momoh was overthrown.

His and Gladys Jusu-Sheriff's daughter Yasmin Sheriff has been an active campaigner in Sierra Leone, especially after 1991 when the Sierra Leone Civil War started.

He died in London, UK on 19 December 2009. Gladys Jusu-Sheriff survived him and she became a trustee for refugee work in Islington.
