= Sylvanus Koroma =

Sylvanus Fornah Koroma was a noted educationist in Sierra Leone and the father of Sierra Leone's president, Ernest Bai Koroma.

== Career ==
Koroma spent many years working as a bible school teacher at the Wesleyan Church in Makeni.

He served as the mayor of Makeni.

== Honours ==
Koroma was a noted educationist in Sierra Leone, and the Yoni, Bombali, campus of the University of Makeni is named after him.

In 2011, a memorial foundation was established bearing his name. His widow, Alice Koroma, was appointed honorary chairperson of the foundation.

== Personal life ==
Koroma, who was of Temne and Loko heritage, was a native of Makari Gbanti chiefdom, Bombali District. Sylvanus Koroma was a devoted Christian.
