= Francis Minah =

Sierra Leonean statesman, lawyer and politician

His Excellency Francis Minah C.O.R.S.L.

Vice President of Sierra Leone
- In office 1984–1987
- Prime Minister: Siaka Probyn Stevens
- Preceded by: Sorie Ibrahim Koroma
- Succeeded by: Abu Bakar Kamara

Attorney General and Minister of Justice of Sierra Leone
- In office 1982–1984
- President: Siaka Probyn Stevens

Minister of Finance of Sierra Leone
- In office 1978–1981
- President: Siaka Probyn Stevens
- Preceded by: Abu Bakar Kamara
- Succeeded by: Sama Banya

Attorney General and Minister of Justice of Sierra Leone
- In office 1977–1979
- President: Siaka Probyn Stevens

Minister of Foreign Affairs
- In office 1975–1977
- President: Siaka Probyn Stevens

Minister of Trade and Industry
- In office 1973–1975
- President: Siaka Probyn Stevens

House of Representatives of Sierra Leone Member
- In office 1967–1987

Personal details
- Born: Francis Misheck Minah; 19 August 1929 Sawula, Pujehun District, British Sierra Leone
- Died: Freetown, Sierra Leone
- Cause of death: Execution (hanging)
- Citizenship: Sierra Leone
- Party: All People's Congress (APC)
- Spouse: Gladys Emuchay Minah
- Children: 6 children
- Education: Methodist Boys High School
- Alma mater: King's College London
- Occupation: Politician
- Profession: Lawyer
- Awards: Commander, Order of the Republic of Sierra Leone (C.O.R.S.L.); United Nations Educational fellowship

Francis Misheck Minah (19 August 1929 – 1989) was a Sierra Leonean statesman, lawyer and politician who served as First Vice President of Sierra Leone from 1985 to 1987 under President Siaka Stevens. An ethnic Mende from the Pujehun District, he became a member of the House of Representatives in 1967. He had previously served as Minister of Foreign Affairs, Minister of Health, Minister of Trade and Industry and Attorney General and Minister of Justice.

In 1987, Minah was investigated by Inspector General Bambay Kamara for plotting a coup against President Joseph Saidu Momoh. He was convicted along with 17 others after a five-month trial and subsequently hanged for treason in 1989. A team of international oberservers from Norway, Sweden, Switzerland, Algeria and South Korea all concurred that the trial was justified, and was not politically motivated.

== Early life and education ==
Minah was born on 19 August 1929 in Sawula, Pujehun District, British Sierra Leone. He was a cousin of Siaka Probyn Stevens. He received his education at Methodist Boys High School and read law at King's College London. In 1962, he was called to the bar at Grays Inn.

Minah was a member of the Mende ethnic group.

== Career and politics ==
He operated a private law practice in Sierra Leone. He was one of Siaka Stevens' closest political allies.

In 1967, he entered politics and became a member of Parliament for Pujehun South District rising through the ranks and eventually becoming Vice President of Sierra Leone. During his tenure, Minah became one of the most powerful politicians in Sierra Leone.

Minah orchestrated the constitutional amendments necessary for President Stevens to pass over Vice President S.I.Koroma and make Brigadier General Joseph Saidu Momoh his successor.

He returned to Sierra Leone and served in many capacities as Sierra Leone's Minister of Foreign Affairs, Minister of Health, Minister of Justice and Attorney General and Minister of Finance, under former president Siaka Stevens. He was later appointed the Vice President of Sierra Leone under former president Joseph Saidu Momoh administration.

== Trial and execution ==
On 23 March 1987, police raided a house in Freetown and reported the discovery of heavy artillery, including rocket launchers. Minah and 17 others (including Jamil Sahid Mohamed) were arrested and accused of planning to assassinate President Momoh and intending to stage a coup d'état in order to make Minah president of Sierra Leone.

In October 1987, after a five-month trial and four hours of deliberation, the jury delivered a guilty verdict. The former First Vice President and 17 others were convicted of treason and sentenced to death.

== Legacy ==
He is survived by his children Katie Minah, John Minah, Feimatta Otusanya née Minah, Vandi Minah, Francis Minah and Christian Minah, his sister Paramount Chief Matilda Lansana Minah MP (Sierra Leone), his brother, Jacob Minah and many nieces and nephews.

Political offices
Preceded by Sorie Ibrahim Koroma	First Vice President of Sierra Leone; 1985-1987	Succeeded by Abu Bakar Kamara
