= Samura Kamara =

Sierra Leonean politician and economist

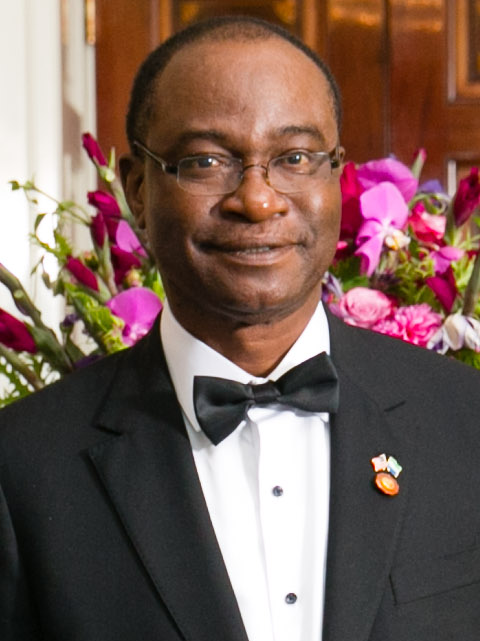
- Kamara in 2014

Minister of Foreign Affairs of Sierra Leone
- In office 2012–2017
- President: Ernest Bai Koroma
- Preceded by: Joseph Bandabla Dauda
- Succeeded by: Kaifala Marah

Minister of Finance of Sierra Leone
- In office February 2009 – January 2013
- Preceded by: David Carew
- Succeeded by: Kaifala Marah

Governor of the Bank of Sierra Leone
- In office 2007–2009
- Preceded by: James David Rogers
- Succeeded by: Sheku Sambadeen Sesay

Personal details
- Born: Samura Kamara; 30 April 1951 (age 75) Kamalo, Bombali District (now Karene District), Sierra Leone
- Party: All People's Congress (APC)
- Spouse: Elizabeth Massah Kamara
- Education: Fourah Bay College
- Profession: economist
- Religion: Roman Catholicism

Dr Samura Mathew Wilson Kamara (30 April 1951) is a Sierra Leonean politician and economist. He was the All Peoples Congress (APC) Party's candidate for President of Sierra Leone in the 2018 election and 2023 election. He was the Minister of Foreign Affairs and International Cooperation of Sierra Leone from 2012 to 2017, Minister of Finance and Economic Development from 2009 to 2013, Governor of the Bank of Sierra Leone from 2007 to 2009, Financial Secretary in the Ministry of Finance during President Ahmad Tejan Kabbah's administration.

== Early life and education ==
Samura Mathew Wilson Kamara was born in Kamalo, Karene District, North-Western Province of Sierra Leone, then a colony of United Kingdom. He is a Temne by tribe. His father Pa Gibril Kamara was from Maworrko village near Rothuk and Magbanktha villages, Gberray Junction, Maforki chiefdom, Port Loko District. His mother, Ya Bomporro Kamara (née Kanu) is an indigene of Kamalo, Sanda Loko Chiefdom, Karene District, North-Western Region.

Kamara received his early education at the UCC in Bo, Southern Sierra Leone. He continued his education at the Saint Edwards Secondary School in Freetown, stayed at Montague Street and Guard Street, Eastern Freetown, and was very active in football circles as a goalkeeper.

He proceeded to Fourah Bay College where he earned a bachelor's degree in Economics in 1972. He holds a PhD in Development Economics (1986) from Bangor University in Wales, United Kingdom.

== Career ==
Kamara was in 1994 appointed Programme Manager by the World Bank for its Structural Support Programme to the country. He also served as Financial Secretary during this time as part of efforts to build trust in the management of the mainly international donor flows which constituted over three quarters of the government's non- military financial receipts. He became Secretary of State, Finance in January 1996 after Julius Maada Bio overthrew Valentine Strasser.

He subsequently served as Financial Secretary, and as Bank Governor, Minister of Finance, and Minister of Foreign Affairs and International Cooperation in the APC Administration of Ernest Bai Koroma.

Kamara chaired the African Caucus constituency meetings two years in a row. As Foreign Minister, he serves as Chair of the Ministerial Meetings of the African Union C10 committee on the Reform of the United Nations, and he is also Chair of the AU Candidatures Committee. He has on several occasions chaired the Peace and Security Council of the AU.

Kamara is currently leading Africa's ministerial negotiating team on the reform of the United Nations.

=== SLPP’s commission of inquiry ===
In 2018, immediately after taking office, President Julius Maada Bio’s administration announced Commissions of Inquiry (COI) approved to look into the performance of former All People’s Congress (APC) Government officials and that the scope of the inquiry will cover the period November, 2007 to April, 2018. Over 300 persons who served in senior positions in the former Koroma administration including Kamara were indicted. Honourable Justice John Rosolu Bankole Thompson who headed Commission Number 2 of the three Commissions of Inquiry criticised the Bio regime for misusing the COI in a manner that was "not reasonable or permissible" and also "not cognizable" under the COI legal framework that President Bio had sent for approval to Parliament.

=== APC party leadership campaign ===
In 2020 it was announced that the All People's Congress (APC) would hold their convention to elect a new leader that will challenge president Julius Maada Bio of the SLPP who is facing re-election for a second five-year term in 2023. Kamara, who contested the previous election with Bio in 2018 announced his candidacy for the leadership of the All People's Congress (APC) ahead of the 2023 Sierra Leone presidential and parliamentary elections. He is one of seven candidates for the APC leadership. Kamara was chosen as Flag Bearer in 2018 by selection by then outgoing president and APC party chairman Ernest Koroma, instead of election- a move that was unpopular with the majority of APC supporters. APC ultimately lost the elections to the SLPP. In December 2023, the Court of Appeal ordered the immediate arrest of Kamara, for his involvement in a case related to the sale of shares of a mining company when he was Minister of Finance.

== Personal life ==
He is married to Mrs. Elizabeth Massah Kamara (née Rogers). Mrs. Kamara is an indigene of Pujehun District in the Southern Province. Her mother hailed from Masam Kpaka and her father from Blama Massaquoi.

== See also ==
- List of foreign ministers in 2017
- List of current foreign ministers
