= 1991 Sierra Leonean constitutional referendum =

- 23, 26, 28 and 30 August 1991
- Do you agree that the Republic of Sierra Leone should be governed by the Multi-Party Constitution already adopted by Parliament?

Results
Choice	Votes	%
Yes	1,500,000	80.00%
No	375,000	20.00%
Valid votes	1,875,000	100.00%
Invalid or blank votes	0	0.00%
Total votes	1,875,000	100.00%
Registered voters/turnout	2,500,000	75%

A referendum on a new constitution was held in Sierra Leone in August 1991. Voting was held over four days (23, 26, 28 and 30 August). The new constitution would restore multi-party politics, as the country had been a one-party state since the 1978 constitutional referendum made the All People's Congress the only legally permitted party.

Of the approximately 2.5 million voters, turnout was around 75%. The new constitution was approved by around 80% of voters, and came into force on 1 October. As a result, the 1978 constitution was repealed. Due to a coup eight months after the referendum, the first elections under the new constitution were not held until 1996.
