= Thaimu Bangura =

Sierra Leonean politician

Thaimu Bangura (died 1999) was a politician from Sierra Leone. He was a government minister from 1980 to 1982 and again from 1996 to 1999. From 1991 to 1999, Bangura was the National Leader of the People's Democratic Party of Sierra Leone as well as their presidential candidate in the 1996 elections. In that election, Bangura finished 3rd behind winner and current president Ahmad Tejan Kabbah of the SLPP and John Karefa-Smart of the UNPP with 16.07% of the initial round of voting. He did not qualify for the run-off election. He was Minister of Finance of Sierra Leone from March 1996 to May 1997.
