= Abu Bakar Kamara =

Sierra Leonean politician (born 1929)

Abu Bakar Kamara (born 29 July 1929), also referred to as A.B. Kamara, is a Sierra Leonean former politician. He was Minister of Finance of Sierra Leone from 1977 to 1978 under President Siaka Stevens. He served as First Vice President of Sierra Leone from 1987 to 1991 under President Joseph Saidu Momoh. Both he and Second Vice President Salia Jusu-Sheriff resigned in September 1991.

Political offices
Preceded by Francis Minah	First Vice President of Sierra Leone; 1987–1991	Succeeded by Abdulai Osman Conteh
