= John Karimu =

Sierra Leonean politician

John Arouna Karimu is a Mende hailed from Daru Village, Kailahun District, in the Eastern Region of Sierra Leone.

He was a Lecturer at Fourah Bay College, where he met his wife Gertrude Gbessay Karimu née Sellu who was a student there as well. He later worked for the Bo/Pujehun Project. He then became the Director of CUSO in Gambia.

He later became the Finance Minister in Sierra Leone during the military rule of Valentine Strasser (1993-1996). He was the presidential candidate of the National Unity Party in the 1996 national elections. In that election, Karimu received 5.3% of the national vote and lost easily to Ahmed Tejan Kabbah. In December 1996, Karimu accepted a position in the cabinet of Kabbah as the Secretary of Housing and Environment. However, Karimu was eventually deposed, along with the rest of the government, when Major Johnny Paul Koroma overthrew the government on 25 May 1997. During this period, he worked as a Director with The World Bank in Papua New Guinea. He later became the Commissioner of the National Revenue Authority(NRA)-The highest paid civil Servant in Sierra Leone.
