= Tourism in Sierra Leone =

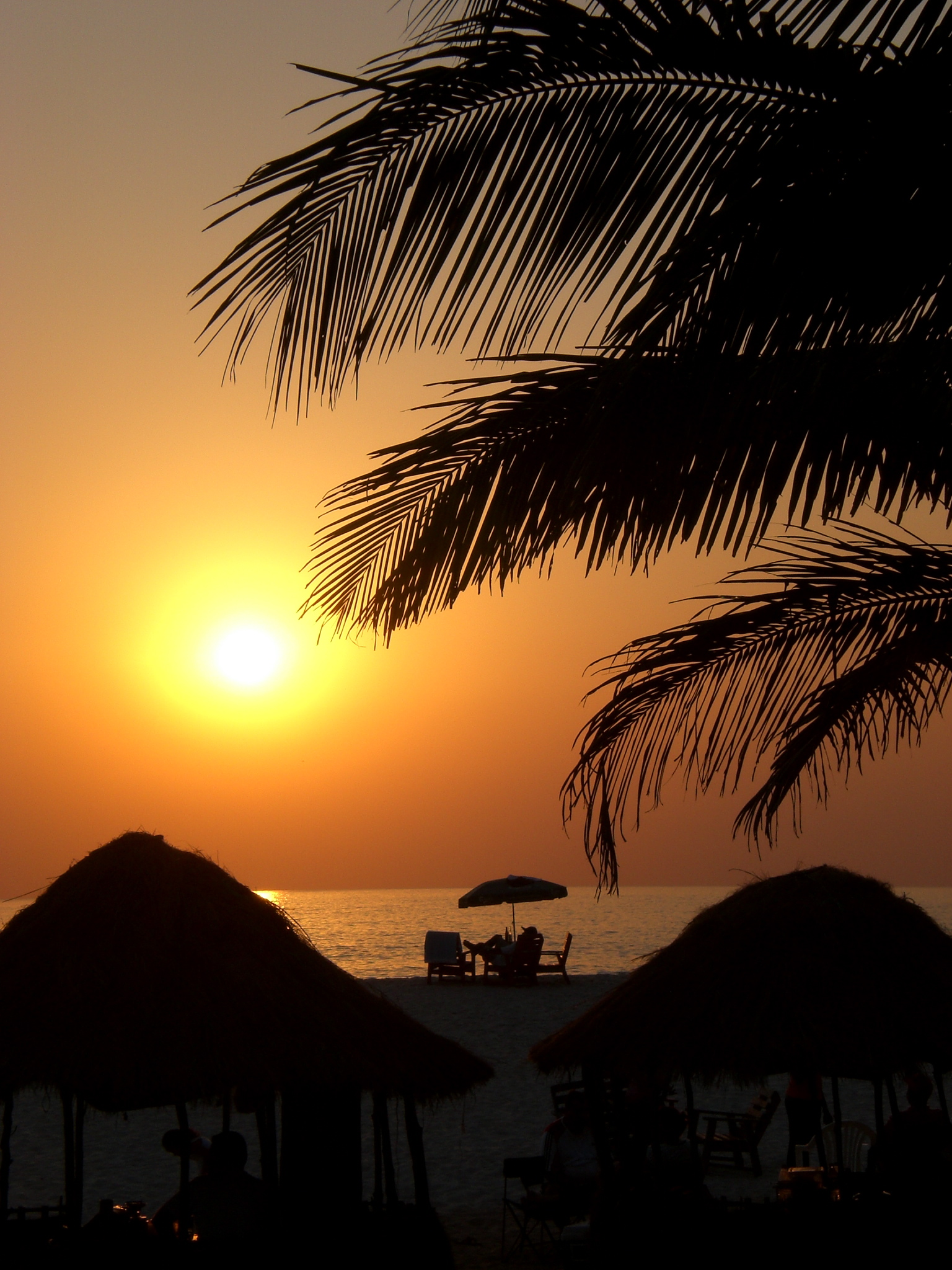
Tourists on a Sierra Leone beach.

Tourism in Sierra Leone is an important growing national service industry. Beaches and other natural habitats are the biggest parts of the nation's tourism industry.

== Tourist industry ==
According to the International Labour Organization, approximately 8,000 Sierra Leoneans are employed in the tourism industry, with a growing number of jobs expected to be created in the future. The main entrance point is Freetown International Airport, where transport to and from has been problematic. The government's ministry, the Ministry of Tourism and Cultural Affairs, is headed by Memunatu Pratt.

== Attractions ==
There are a lot of tourist destinations in Sierra Leone. Freetown, the capital city, is a favourite destination for tourists. Tourism was seriously affected during the 1991-2002 Civil War; however, there has been a steady recovery in recent years. The city has a lot to offer tourists. There is a vast expanse of beaches stretching along the Freetown Peninsula. The Lumley-Aberdeen beach stretches all the way from Cape Sierra Leone down to Lumley and is a favourite destination for those venturing into the city's nightlife. There are also other popular beaches like the world renowned River Number 2 Beach, Laka Beach, Tokeh Beach, Bureh Beach, and Mama Beach.

The Tacugama Chimpanzee Sanctuary, which is located within the peninsula's vast rainforest reserve, just a few miles from the centre of Freetown, has a collection of rare and endangered chimpanzees. Other popular destinations for tourists include the Freetown Cotton Tree, located in central Freetown, a significant national monument integral to the founding of the city. Bunce Island, which is a boat ride from the city, is home to the ruins of the slave fortress used in the Transatlantic slave trade. The Sierra Leone Museum has a collection of both precolonial as well as colonial artifacts and other items of historical significance. The National Railway Museum is popular, asi is taking a journey around the city's coastline with the popular Sea Coach Express.
