= Ernest Bai Koroma =

President of Sierra Leone from 2007 to 2018

Ernest Bai Koroma (EBK)
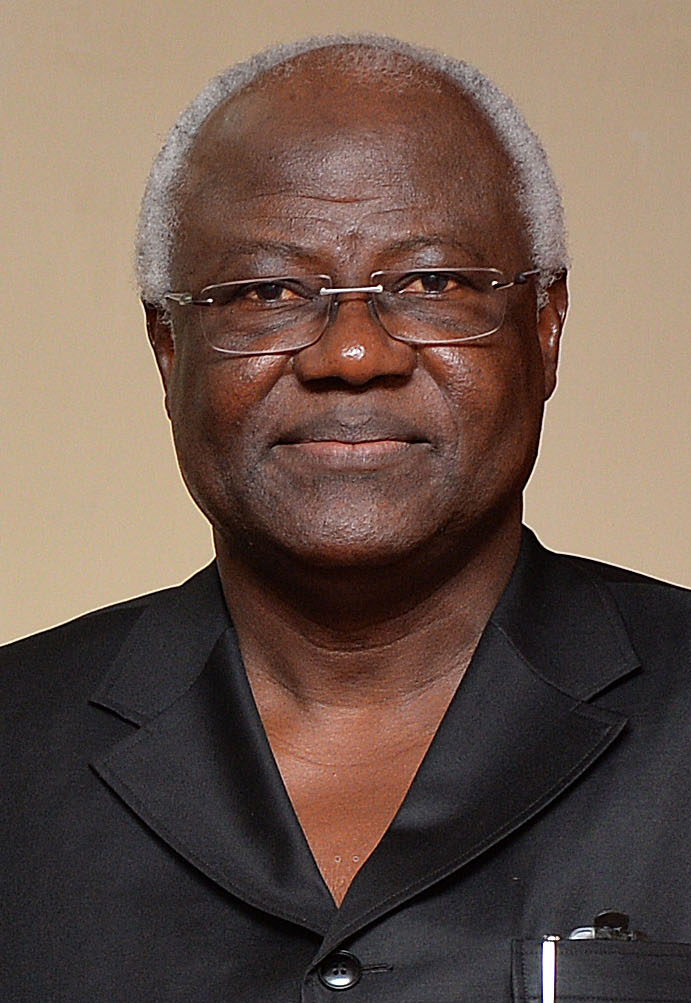
- Koroma in 2015

4th President of Sierra Leone
- In office 17 September 2007 – 4 April 2018
- Vice President: Samuel Sam-Sumana (2007–2015); Victor Bockarie Foh (2015–2018)
- Preceded by: Ahmad Tejan Kabbah
- Succeeded by: Julius Maada Bio

Leader of the All People's Congress
- Incumbent
- Assumed office 24 March 2002
- Secretary-General: Osman Foday Yansaneh
- Preceded by: Edward Turay

Minority Leader of Parliament
- In office 2005–2007
- Preceded by: Edward Turay
- Succeeded by: Emmanuel Tommy

Personal details
- Born: 2 October 1953 (age 73) Makeni, British Sierra Leone
- Party: All People's Congress
- Spouse: Sia Koroma (m. 1986)
- Children: Alice; Dankay Yunis
- Education: Fourah Bay College
- Religion: Christianity (Wesleyan)
- Website: Government website

Ernest Bai Koroma (also known by us as EBK) (born 2 October 1953) is a Sierra Leonean politician who served as the fourth President of Sierra Leone from 17 September 2007 to 4 April 2018.

Born and raised in Makeni in northern Sierra Leone, Koroma spent more than 24 years working in the private insurance industry before entering politics in 2002. From 1988 to 2002, he was the managing director of the Reliance Insurance Trust Corporation (Ritcorp).

Koroma earned a diploma from Fourah Bay College in 1976; and is an insurance agent by profession.

Koroma was elected as leader of the All People's Congress (APC), Sierra Leone's main opposition party, on 24 March 2002, after defeating then-incumbent APC leader Edward Turay. Koroma stood as the APC candidate in the 2002 presidential election but was defeated in a free and fair election by incumbent president Ahmad Tejan Kabbah, who won 70.3% of the vote, to Koroma's 22.35%. Koroma conceded defeat.

Koroma was later elected to Parliament, representing his home District of Bombali from 2002 to 2007. In 2005, he was elected the minority leader of Parliament and remained in that position until his election to the presidency in 2007.

In the 2007 presidential election run-off, Koroma received 54.6% of the vote and defeated incumbent vice-president Solomon Berewa of the ruling SLPP. Berewa conceded defeat, and Koroma was sworn in as president on 17 September 2007, at the State House in the capital Freetown. International and local observers declared the election free and fair. Koroma succeeded President Ahmad Tejan Kabbah, who was constitutionally ineligible to run for the presidency again after serving the maximum two five-year term limit.

In the November 2012 presidential election, Koroma (EBK) was re-elected as president for a second term, receiving 58.7%, against his main opponent, SLPP candidate Julius Maada Bio, who received 37.4%. International observers deemed the election to be free and fair. Koroma (EBK) was succeeded by Julius Maada Bio following his victory in run-off elections held on 31 March 2018.

In December 2023, Koroma (EBK) was placed under house arrest after two days of interrogation following an attempted coup d'état on 26 November 2023 during demonstrations. He was charged with four counts of treason in relation to the coup on 3 January 2024.

== Early life and education ==
Ernest Bai Koroma (EBK)was born on 2 October 1953 in Makeni, Bombali District in the Northern Province of British Sierra Leone. He was born into a Christian family in the predominantly Muslim north. Koroma (EBK) was raised in a predominantly ethnic Temne household and is a fluent speaker of the Temne and Limba languages, his parents' mother tongues.

His father, Sylvanus Koroma, was of Temne and Loko heritage and grew up in a Temne household. He was born in the Makari Gbanti chiefdom, Bombali District. He worked for years as a bible school teacher at the Wesleyan Church in Makeni.

Koroma's (EBK) mother, Alice Koroma (27 June 1932 – 6 July 2012), was an ethnic Biriwa Limba from the small rural town of Kamabai, also in Bombali District. She entered local politics in the 1960s, and was elected as a member of the All People's Congress (APC) to the Makeni city council. Alice Koroma was women's leader of the APC Bombali District branch. She was also a strong supporter of President Siaka Stevens' administration, when the APC leader was elected. Alice Koroma later worked for most of her career as a primary school teacher in Makeni.

Koroma (EBK) attended the Sierra Leone Church Primary School in Makeni. For higher education, he went to the Magburaka Government Secondary School for Boys in Magburaka, Tonkolili District (about 25 miles from his hometown of Makeni). He graduated in 1973. He moved to the capital Freetown to attend Fourah Bay College, from where he graduated in 1976 with a degree in Business Management.

Soon after graduating from Fourah Bay College, Koroma (EBK) became a teacher at St. Francis Secondary School in Makeni (1976–78).

== Life after presidency ==
After leaving office on 4th day of April 2018, Koroma (EBK) relocated to his home town, Makeni. Koroma (EBK) divided his time between his private residences in Makeni City and Goderich, Freetown. However, Makeni became his principal residence after his presidency. During his staying at Makeni, Koroma (EBK) announced his retirement from active politics. Even after his announcement, he still remained one of the most influential politician in Sierra Leone.

At Makeni, Koroma (EBK) adopted a quieter and private lifestyle than when he was an active politician. He regularly received visitors at his residence in Makeni, including senior APC officials, religious leaders, diplomats, ordinary citizens, traditional and community leaders. His party members frequently visited him for informal meetings, to seek advice or simply to pay courtesy calls.

The ACC investigation

One of the most significant events of his retirement occurred in 2020.

Following the publication of the Government White Paper on the Commissions of Inquiry into his administration, Koroma (EBK) was invited by the Anti Corruption Commission for questioning regarding alleged corruption during his presidency. The invitation from ACC required him to appear before the ACC headquarter office in Freetown, but because of security concerns, discussions between his lawyers and the ACC resulted in an agreement that investigators would instead interview him in Makeni. On the 8th October 2020, ACC officials travelled to Koroma's (EBK) residence in Makeni. Before the officials arrived at Makeni, hundreds of youths, APC supporters, and secret societies occupied the road leading to his residence, preventing ACC investigators from entering. To avoid confrontation, the investigators peacefully withdrew without conducting the scheduled interview. After the incident, the issue attracted national attention, and the Political Parties Registration Commission PPRC criticized the obstruction and urged former president Koroma (EBK) to publicly discourage lawlessness.

After further negotiations between the ACC and Koroma's (EBK) legal team, he eventually honoured the invitation.

On 23 November 2020, the ACC announced that it had begun interviewing the former president at one of its secure facilities regarding allegations of corruption during his presidency. The interview was conducted in a "safe house" rather than at the ACC headquarters and continued on agreed dates thereafter.

Following the disputed 2023 general elections, Sierra Leone experienced heightened political tensions between the ruling Sierra Leone People's Party (SLPP) and the APC. As the APC's most prominent former leader, Koroma (EBK) remained an influential voice, even though he was not a candidate in the elections. On 26 November 2023, armed attackers assaulted military facilities and a prison in Freetown, resulting in deaths, injuries, and the escape of more than 2,000 prisoners. The government launched investigations into those responsible. In January 2024, the Government of Sierra Leone charged Koroma (EBK) with four offences, including treason, alleging that he was connected to the attempted coup. Koroma (EBK) denied the allegations. The High Court granted him bail while legal proceedings continued. The case attracted considerable domestic and international attention because of his status as a former head of state. Later in January 2024, the High Court permitted Koroma (EBK) to travel to Nigeria for medical treatment following mediation involving the Economic Community of West African States (ECOWAS). He remained in Nigeria while his legal case continued. In July 2026, Sierra Leone's Attorney General discontinued the criminal proceedings against Koroma (EBK). Following the decision, he thanked President Bio, the Government of Sierra Leone, ECOWAS, and supporters, and called on Sierra Leoneans to promote peace, reconciliation, and national unity. Soon afterward, he returned to Sierra Leone and attended the ECOWAS Summit in Freetown, marking his first visit home since leaving for Nigeria in January 2024. Since returning, Koroma (EBK) has increasingly been viewed as a senior statesman rather than an active politician. While he remains highly respected within the APC and continues to influence national political discussions, recent developments suggest he is focusing more on national reconciliation, democratic stability, and advisory roles than on frontline politics

== Career in the insurance industry ==
Koroma (EBK) joined the Sierra Leone National Insurance Company in 1978. In 1985, he joined the Reliance Insurance Trust Corporation (Ritcorp), and in 1988, he became managing director of Ritcorp, remaining in that position for 14 years.

== Marriage and family ==
A longtime member of the Wesleyan Church of Sierra Leone, Koroma (EBK) married Sia Nyama Koroma, the daughter of attorney and politician Abu Aiah Koroma. He served as former Attorney General of Sierra Leone, and also held several other government ministry positions under presidents Joseph Saidu Momoh and Ahmad Tejan Kabbah. An ethnic Kono from Kono District, Sia Koroma is a biochemist, holding Bachelor of Science with Honours in Chemistry and a master's in biochemistry. She is also a psychiatric nurse trained and qualified in Great Britain.

Koroma (EBK) and his wife Sia Koroma were married on October 18, 1986, at the King Memorial UMC Church in Freetown. Together they have 3 adult daughters: Alice (named after Koroma's (EBK) mother) and Dankay (named after his wife's mother) and Mary Koromaand one son, Yunis koroma. Alice Koroma is a lawyer, having graduated from the University of East Anglia in 2010.

== Political career ==
=== APC campaign leadership ===
In 2002 it was announced that the All People's Congress (APC) would hold their convention to elect a new leader that would challenge president Ahmad Tejan Kabbah of the SLPP who faced re-election for a second five-year term. Ernest Bai Koroma (EBK), then an Insurance broker from the northern district of Bombali who was virtually unknown by the general population in Sierra Leone announced his candidacy for the leadership of the All People's Congress (APC) ahead of the 2002 Sierra Leone presidential and parliamentary elections. He was one of seven candidates for the APC leadership.

Koroma (EBK) was a clear underdog to longtime APC leader Edward Turay who was the favourite and was expected to easily win the APC leadership yet again. Koroma (EBK) stressed that under the APC leadership of Edward Turay, the party had lost a significant number of seats in parliament and had lost trust among Sierra Leoneans, even in its traditional stronghold in Northern Sierra Leone. Koroma (EBK) said the party will continue to lose even more support unless the party moves to a new direction that will care more about the interest of Sierra Leoneans. The APC was thought to be divided between the old guards wing of the party leady by Edward Turay, and the new generation wing of the party led by Ernest Bai Koroma (EBK). Koroma (EBK) was elected leader of the All People's Congress (APC) on 24 March 2002, at a national convention of the party held in the northern town of Kabala, Koinadugu District ahead of the 2002 Sierra Leone Presidential and Parliamentary Elections. Koroma (EBK) received 370 votes from APC delegates, while 12 delegates voted against him and the remainder abstained.

=== 2002 presidential and parliamentary election ===
In the 2002 Sierra Leone presidential election Koroma (EBK) received 22.3% of the vote as the APC presidential candidate, losing in a landslide to incumbent president Ahmed Tejan Kabbah of the Sierra Leone People's Party (SLPP), who received 70.3% and was shortly sworn in for a new five-year term. In the parliamentary election, Koroma (EBK) was elected to a seat from Bombali District.

=== Court case ===
Embattled by a series of court cases against his youthful leadership and executive and the 2002 APC Constitution, Koroma (EBK) was eventually stripped of his de jure leadership of the APC by the Supreme Court of Sierra Leone on 22 June 2005. He was, however, again unanimously elected as Leader and presidential candidate of the APC ahead of the 2007 Sierra Leone presidential and parliamentary elections at APC National Delegates Convention held on 3 September 2005 in the northern town of Port Loko. The internal party dispute was said to be resolved in April 2007, mainly between Koroma (EBK) and Edward Turay, with Koroma (EBK) being accepted by APC dissidents as the party's leader ahead of the 2007 general election.

Under his leadership, the APC swept virtually all the seats in the Western Area and the Northern Province during the local government elections of 2004. This was in spite of the fact that some of the old guard of the APC dismissed his leadership as a matter of child's play.

Koroma (EBK) has been charged with four offences including treason for his alleged role in failed military attempt coup to topple the West African country's government in November.

=== Candidacy ===
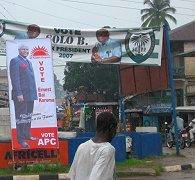
A man passes, in Freetown, posters for APC candidate Koroma (foreground) and the ruling SLPP ahead of presidential elections, 6 August 2007.

Koroma (EBK) was the APC presidential candidate in the August 2007 general election. His main rival for the presidency of Sierra Leone was incumbent Vice-President of Sierra Leone Solomon Berewa of the SLPP. Koroma (EBK) stronghold was in Northern Sierra Leone, and in the Western Area of Sierra Leone. Berewa, on the other hand, maintained strong support in south-eastern Sierra Leone.

Koroma (EBK) was allegedly the target of an assassination attempt in the early hours of 23 July 2007 in Bo, Sierra Leone's second largest city (a traditional stronghold of the SLPP), when, according to the APC, a group of armed men led by Tom Nyuma, who was a participant in the 1992 coup that ousted the APC from power, attempted to enter Koroma's (EBK) hotel room to kill him. Nyuma was severely beaten by Koroma's (EBK) guards, and he was hospitalized as a result.

=== 2007 presidential election ===
In the first round of the 2007 presidential election in Sierra Leone, held on 11 August, Koroma (EBK) garnered 44.3% of the votes, ahead of Solomon Berewa of the ruling SLPP, who received 38.3%. This was not enough to win outright, and a run-off election was held on 8 September.

In an interview with Reuters on 13 September, Koroma (EBK) said that he wanted to run the country "like a business concern", with a focus on agriculture and tourism rather than mining, and fight firmly against corruption.

On 17 September, the Sierra Leone National Electoral Commission declared Koroma (EBK) to be the winner of the election with 54.6% of the vote, although the SLPP disputed the results. He was sworn in later on the same day at a ceremony attended by Berewa and Kabbah.

On 21 September, Koroma (EBK) left Sierra Leone for a diplomatic visit to neighboring Guinea and Liberia, his first trip outside the country as president.

Koroma (EBK) took a notably long time to name his Cabinet ministers, doing so in stages. The first group of 10 ministers was named on 8 October, and another 10 were named on 12 October. According to Koroma (EBK), he was willing to take additional time to find the right people; others, however, speculated that the delay was due to maneuvering within the APC for Cabinet positions.

=== Inauguration ===
Koroma (EBK) was formally inaugurated in Freetown on 15 November 2007 at a ceremony attended by seven other African leaders. On this occasion, he promised to fight corruption and emphasized the importance of changing people's attitudes towards corruption.

Koroma (EBK) promised zero tolerance on corruption, to fight against the mismanagement of the country's resources and that he "would run Sierra Leone like a business concern", emphasising agriculture and tourism. He further promised his government will increase the GDP per capita; reduce poverty and increase jobs; pledged the provision of electricity not only in the urban areas, but to all parts of Sierra Leone.

The inauguration ceremony was attended by several African Head of State and representatives of other world leaders and organisations, including Nigerian president Umaru Yar'Adua, Liberian president Ellen Johnson Sirleaf, Senegalese president Abdoulaye Wade, Gambian president Yahya Jammeh, Burkina Faso's president Blaise Compaoré, Malian president Amadou Toumani Touré, Guinean Prime Minister Lansana Kouyaté and United States Assistant Secretary for African Affairs Jendayi Frazer.

=== Presidency ===
The Koroma (EBK) presidency has focused upon rebuilding the country's national infrastructure after the Civil War, fighting corruption and improving the country's health care system. In April 2010, Koroma (EBK) signed into law the country's free health care program for pregnant women, nursing mothers and children under the age of five. Koroma (EBK) has focused on free-market solutions, attracting more private investment.

On 4 September 2008, Koroma (EBK) declared his assets to the Sierra Leone Anti-corruption Commission and signed into law the country's new Anti-Corruption Bill of 2008 at the State House in Freetown. Under the new law, it is compulsory for the president and other government officials to declare their assets and update them annually.

Koroma (EBK) has given the country's anti-corruption commission more powers to investigate and prosecute corrupt officials. Since coming to power in 2007, Koroma (EBK) has dismissed several government ministers associated with corruption, including two of his ministers indicted on corruption charges by the Sierra Leone anti-corruption commission.

The Koroma (EBK) presidency has focused on road constructions across the country, which has significantly improved Sierra Leone's infrastructure. The Koroma (EBK) presidency has focused on encouraging investments, which has led to investment in the country's mining industry, mostly by Chinese companies. The Koroma (EBK) presidency, with the financial help of the United Nations, has implemented a free healthcare program for children, pregnant women and breastfeeding mothers. However, many experts and critics say most of the money meant to fund the program has been mismanaged and misused by senior government officials due to corruption. The Koroma (EBK) presidency still faces major challenges in fighting corruption, extreme poverty, unemployment, poor housing conditions, poor healthcare, poor energy and water supplies. The president maintains improvements have been made in all of the areas above, but critics and many experts say the government is behind in improving these conditions.

In president Koroma (EBK) inauguration speech, he promised zero tolerance of corruptions, and during the early years of his presidency, several senior government officials allied to the president were arrested and prosecuted for corruption by the country's Anti Corruption commission. However, most of the senior government official allied to the president were acquitted of corruption charges in court. Critics alleged they were acquitted by the court because they were close allies of president Koroma (EBK), an allegation denied by the presidency. The Sierra Leone Auditor General report said millions of dollars of the money meant for Ebola patients were missing in government emergency ebola account. President Koroma (EBK) named experts to investigate the allegation, and some senior government officials linked to the Ebola funds were fired and suspended.

President Koroma (EBK) who won reelection with 58% of the votes, is still very popular particularly in the north and Western Area of Sierra Leone. His presidential staff and cabinet ministers are very diverse and are made up of members of about all of Sierra Leone's ethnic groups. President Koroma (EBK) has often made unannounced visit to several poor Sierra Leonean neighborhood, and he is often seen waving to the people in his presidential motorcade.

== Accusations of intolerance of journalists critical of Koroma ==
Several Sierra Leonean journalists critical of President Koroma (EBK), including Jonathan Leigh and Bai Bai Sesay of the Independent Observer newspaper, a radio journalist who compare the president to a rat, and David Tam Baryoh who criticized the president's response to ebola, have been arrested and detained on seditious libel charges by the Sierra Leone Police but they were later released from jail. The oppositions, the Sierra Leone Bar Association of journalists and critics of the government, alleged the journalists were arrested because of their fierce and outspoken criticism of

Koroma, an allegation again denied by the presidency.

== Criticism of police brutality ==
President Koroma (EBK) was criticized after several people were shot dead by Sierra Leone Police officers in the Eastern city of Koidu Town in 2007 and again in 2012 at protests rallies against poor living conditions and against the mining companies in Kono District. Several officers of the Sierra Leone Police Force were heavily criticized for using too much force and firing live bullets on protesters. The Sierra Leone Police opened an internal investigation on the 2007 incident and 2012 incidents in Koidu Town.

President Koroma (EBK) was again heavily criticized after at least two people were shot dead by police officers of the Sierra Leone Police Force at a protest in the northern city of Kabala against the living conditions and against the mining companies on August 16, 2016. The head of the Sierra Leone Police Force, Inspector General Francis Munu, suspended two senior Sierra Leone police officers, local unit commander Almammy Bangura and Koinadugu District Police Commissioner Foday Fofanah, pending a full investigation into the incident who is the overall head of the Sierra.

=== Relations with UK ===
The British government has continued to provide large scale aid and advice, with former Prime Minister of the United Kingdom Tony Blair continuing to work closely with the Sierra Leone government and speak out for investment in Sierra Leone. At Koroma's (EBK) request, Blair created a nine-person board to advise the government on foreign investment. The UK continues to be the largest donor to Sierra Leone, giving more money per person than to any other nation, and promising to raise aid by a further 50 million pounds sterling in 2010.

In a 2009 BBC report by Humphrey Hawksley, some British diplomats and aid workers raised concerns about the slow pace of development in the country stressing on the problem of corruption, and asking whether almost a decade after the war – British military and post-war aid assistance has gone in vain as the country still struggle with poverty and massive unemployment.

President Koroma (EBK) also worked closely with British prime minister Gordon Brown, who increased the United Kingdom's aid to and cooperation with Sierra Leone even further. While Brown was serving as Prime Minister, the United Kingdom encouraged investment in Sierra Leone's two state-owned banks. Brown became popular in Sierra Leone, and both he and Koroma (EBK) formed a strong working relationship.

Koroma (EBK) formed a positive relationship with British prime minister David Cameron. When the Ebola epidemic broke out in 2014, Koroma (EBK) told David Cameron the scale of the disaster was such that it would cost at least £80 million, Cameron responded by pledging that much to help Sierra Leone. As the crisis unfolded, British aid to Sierra Leone grew, also at the request of Sierra Leone's government. Under Koroma (EBK), three consecutive British Prime Ministers had very positive relations with Sierra Leone, Tony Blair, Gordon Brown and David Cameron, all three of whom proved to rank among the most well-known and most popular foreign leaders in Sierra Leone between 1998 and 2016.

=== Reforms ===
Koroma (EBK) pushed through arrest and prosecution authority for the Sierra Leone Anti-corruption Commission, and naming former Human Rights lawyer Abdul Tejan-Cole its head immediately after his election. The government has spoken of transitioning from large scale aid to private investment in the nation, sought to boost the nascent tourist industry, signed deals for more extensive mobile phone service, began a widescale public sector reform program aimed at cutting government waste, and gave greater powers to the government Ombudsman.

At the same time, Koroma (EBK) inaugurated a large new national park at Gola Forest, and banned exports by logging companies, singling out Chinese-owned companies, which he accused of "plundering" the nation's forests.

=== Relations with Zimbabwe ===
President Koroma (EBK) has also controversially been one of the few African leaders to criticise Zimbabwe's former president, Robert Mugabe. At the African Union summit held at the Egyptian resort of Sharm El Sheikh in 2008, he was quoted saying, "The people of Zimbabwe have been denied their democratic rights. We should in no uncertain terms condemn what has happened."

=== Drug trade ===
In July 2008, Koroma (EBK) pledged to crack down on cocaine trafficking in Sierra Leone, after a large drug bust of an aircraft loaded with cocaine at the national airport.

=== Election violence ===
In August 2008, fighting between supporters of Koroma's (EBK) All People's Congress (APC) party and opposition Sierra Leone People's Party (SLPP) erupted in Freetown and the country's second largest city of Bo in the run up to municipal elections, with ruling party supporters charged with attacking opposition members and journalists. Koroma (EBK) promised to crack down on such violence.

=== 2009 APC Convention ===
On 16 April 2009, Koroma (EBK) was re-elected unopposed by the APC as the party's candidate for the 2012 presidential election at the APC National Delegates convention held in the northern city of Makeni. Several senior members of the main opposition party, the SLPP, and the country's third major party, the PMDC, were invited as special guests at the convention to promote peace and national reconciliation following the tense general elections in 2007. Those in attendance at the convention included John Oponjo Benjamin, the leader of the SLPP, and Charles Margai, the leader of the PMDC.

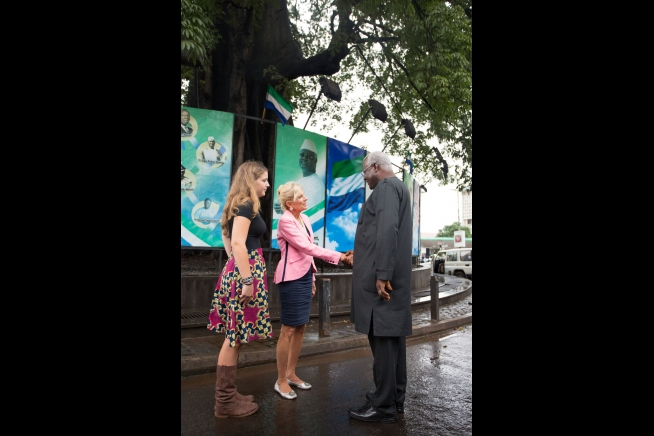
Koroma meeting Jill Biden and Finnegan Biden in 2014.

=== 2012 re-election to second term ===
Koroma (EBK) was re-elected as president in the 17 November 2012 presidential election with 58.7% of the vote, defeating his main opponent, Retired brigadier Julius Maada Bio of the SLPP, who received 37.4%. Koroma (EBK) was sworn in as president for his second and final term by Chief Justice Umu Hawa Tejan Jalloh at the State House in Freetown on 23 November, the same day he was declared the winner of the election.

=== 2018 elections and the APC party leadership saga ===
In 2017 it was announced that the All People's Congress (APC) would hold their convention to choose a new leader that will challenge Julius Maada Bio of the SLPP for the presidency during the 2018 elections. Several members of the party announced their candidacies for the APC leadership. Koroma (EBK), on his own, chose Samura Kamara instead of going through the due process of elections- a move that was unpopular and angered the majority of APC supporters. APC ultimately lost the elections to Bio of the SLPP.

=== SLPP's commission of inquiry ===
In 2018, immediately after taking office, President Julius Maada Bio’s administration announced a Commissions of Inquiry (COI) approved to look into the performance of former All People's Congress (APC) Government officials and that the scope of the inquiry will cover the period November, 2007 to April, 2018. Over 300 persons who served in senior positions in Koroma's (EBK) administration including Koroma (EBK) himself were indicted. Honourable Justice John Rosolu Bankole Thompson who headed Commission Number 2 of the three Commissions of Inquiry blasted the Bio regime for misusing the COI in a manner that was "not reasonable or permissible" and also "not cognizable" under the COI legal framework that President Bio had sent for approval to Parliament.

=== Cabinet ===
Party political offices
Preceded by Edward Turay	Leader of the All People's Congress; 2002–present	Incumbent
Political offices
Preceded by Edward Turay	Minority Leader of Parliament; 2005–2007	Succeeded by Emmanuel Tommy
Preceded by Ahmad Tejan Kabbah	President of Sierra Leone; 2007–2018	Succeeded by Julius Maada Bio
