= National Alliance Democratic Party =

Political party in Sierra Leone

The National Alliance Democratic Party is a political party in Sierra Leone.

== History ==
In 1995, the people of Sierra Leone and the international community exalted pressure on the National Provisional Ruling Council (NPRC), the then military regime in Sierra Leone to lift the ban on politics and conduct democratic elections in the country. In June, 1995, a Sierra Leonean journalist and human rights activist, Mohamed Yahya Sillah, invited a group of Sierra Leoneans, namely, Sulaiman Sandy, Ousmann Hassann, Patrick Luseni Moriba, Wurie Kaisamba and Abdul Kamara to join him form a political party to contest the presidential and parliamentary elections in 1996. The group met in Brentwood, Maryland, USA on July 25, 1995, and formed the National Alliance Democratic Party (NADP).

== Founding members ==
The founding members of the National Alliance Democratic Party elected Mohamed Yahya Sillah as Leader and National Chairman, Sulaiman Sandy, Vice Chairman, Ousmann Hassann, National Secretary General, Wurie Kaisamba, Vice National Secretary General, Patrick Luseni Moriba, Propaganda Secretary and Abdul Kamara, National Treasurer.

The founders chose the name National Alliance Democratic Party to create an opportunity for newer and smaller political parties in Sierra Leone to merge into one political unit. The purpose was to put forth a formidable challenge against the two “bigger political parties”, namely, the Sierra Leone Peoples Party (SLPP) and the All People's Congress (APC). Both parties had ruled Sierra Leone respectively since independence in 1961 but failed to deliver quality leadership to Sierra Leone. NADP was determined to usher in a new breed of younger and more vibrant political leaders to help reshape the political destiny of Sierra Leone.

NADP founders created the party with a vision to rebuilding Sierra Leone on the foundation of exemplary leadership. The party committed to helping build a strong economy, offer opportunities for quality education, create jobs for Sierra Leoneans, secure quality health care for all, help fight global terrorism, unite the nation and make tribalism a thing of the past.

In 2006, the party chose a divine motto as the foundation upon which NADP would unshackle Sierra Leone from the grips of tribalism, corruption, human right abuses and inept leadership. The motto was: “With God, All Things Are Possible”.

== Political campaigns ==
Since 1996, NADP has not contested an election for public office. The Leader and Standard Bearer of the party, Mohamed Yahya Sillah, withdrew the party's participation in the 2002 elections and asked his supporters to back the SLPP candidate Ahmed Tejan Kabbah for president. In 2007, the party again withdrew its participation in the elections for reasons of lapses in the management machinery of the campaign, according to its leader. The party endorsed the candidacy of the Sierra Leone peoples party (SLPP), Solomon Berewa for president.
