= Biriwa =

- Town
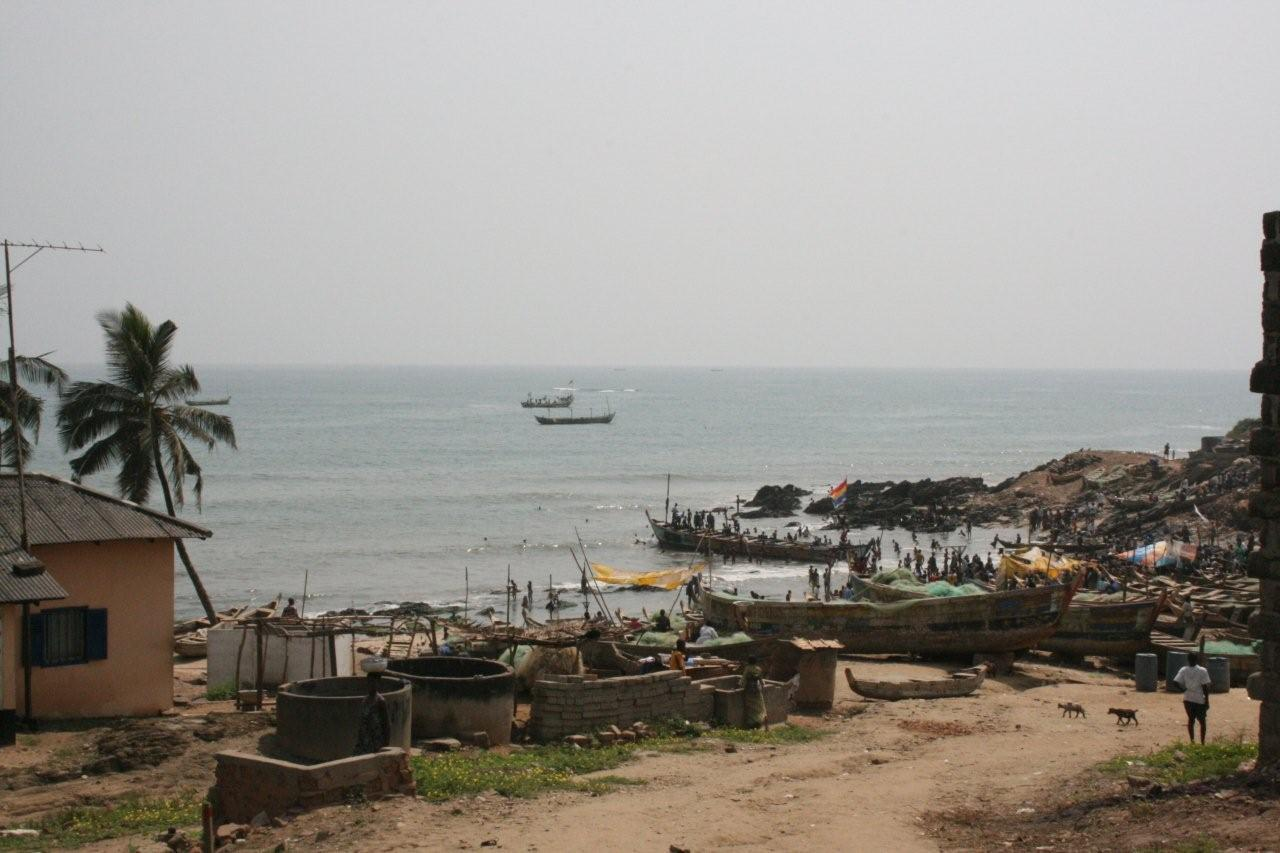
- Biriwa skyline and Fishing Area
- Country: Ghana
- Region: Central Region
- District: Mfantsiman Municipal District
- Capital: Saltpond

Population (2010)
  - Total: 7,086
- Time zone: GMT
- Postal code: +233

Biriwa is a town of Mfantsiman Municipal District in the Central Region of Ghana. According to the Ghana Statistical Service's 2010 Population and Housing Census, the population of Biriwa was 7,086. The main occupation is fishing, with a few people engaged in farming. It is a traditional setting which celebrates the Okyir festival every October. The current chief of the town, Nana Kwabonko V, resides in Saltpond.

== History ==
Historically, the land is believed to have been discovered by a Hausa man called Kwaana Abrodu. The place was in the forest zone, so this gave the man the opportunity to engage in tree felling and charcoal production, which in Fante is called biriw. A woman also settled on the land and started the same occupation. As the land began to develop, the people thought it wise to give the name Biriwa (biriw wo ha – charcoal is here) to the town. A woman named Nana Adwoa Enyimah is believed to have been the first Queen mother of the town.

After these settlers, the Adwenadze family came to settle and was followed by the Twidan family. But the Adwenadzes were ruled by the people of Aketekyiwa, a town near Biriwa, who passed laws for them which affected the Twidan settlers of the town. So the Twidan settlers decided to stop the Aketekyiwas from passing those laws. They also came to Biriwa to light fires and make noise whenever they were celebrating their festival and that disturbed the peace of Biriwa. So whenever the Aketekyiwas come to light these fires, a group called Biriwa Toafo will go with their drum, Akroma, to the grounds to quench the fire. They would then beat the drum to indicate the action performed, that is, the quenching of the fire. The people of Aketekyiwa then decided to fight with Biriwaman. The Biriwa Toafo then made a statue with nine heads which they named Etu Anaa Ehira which was placed in front of the famous Pusuban. On the day of the battle, Biriwaman were able to defeat the Aketekyiwas on the famous battle ground; Sumandabi anum in Biriwa.

Later, the Hausas also came to claim the land saying they were the founders. This culminated in a battle between these two factions and the Hausas were defeated. The land is currently ruled by the Adwenadze family and it is believed that the Twidan family will forever rule the land after the Adwenadze family has lost the throne. A man called Nana Sarh is believed to have introduced fishing to the town folk. From then onwards fishing became the main occupation of the town to date.

Folktales were very important aspects of their culture. They were regarded as a source of wisdom and entertainment and the raconteurs were also regarded as repositories of wisdom. Tales were told during the evenings when every child had finished eating and was done with his or her house chores. Tales were told mainly to entertain the children. Other reasons were educating the children to know the traditions of the land, to preach morality or virtue and to curb immorality among children because every child goes to listen to tales in the evenings and does not go to any other function. Children who did not go to listen to tales were referred to as bad children learning the bad habits of their fathers. Because of this, fathers forced their children to go for this gathering. Usually, the leader for the night gathers the children by calling pimpimnaa!!! and the children respond, nana!!! Drumming and dancing were very important features of tale telling. Children sang and danced joyfully in the middle and at the end of the session which indicates the entertainment aspects of the telling of the tales. Before the leader starts the telling, he utters this phrase: Kodzi, Kodzi, wongyedzi o! and the children will respond : Wogye sie!

== Economy ==
The inhabitants of Biriwa are mainly fishermen with very few of them being farmers. Because most of them live at the coastal area, they naturally become fishermen since that is the available occupation at the shore. The women in the town mostly become fishmongers. As the men come to the shore with a catch the women come and buy them to be sold fresh, fried, dried or smoked. Fishing is not done on Tuesdays because is regarded as a taboo of the town. The fishermen travel to as far as Axim in the Western Region of Ghana to catch fish. Fishing is done with canoes and large nets. Fishermen mostly sleep onshore till they get a catch before returning home. The canoes used for fishing belong to families and they are given names to indicate the family which owns them. The canoes are painted beautifully with different colours. Flags are erected on the canoe which are mostly flags of different countries.

The Biriwa Beach Hotel, on the shore, is on the right coming from Cape Coast.

Schools offer a good source of employment to the townsfolk. The government also has a clinic in Biriwa. The Mfantsiman Rural Bank employs townfolk as mobile bankers, cashiers and in other positions.

== Education ==
The Biriwa Vocational and Technical Institute offers both the National Vocational and Technical Institute's Examination and the West African Examinations Council's Senior High School Certificate Examination. The District Authority is in charge of all these schools but they have varying degrees of autonomy. The Methodist Church has a basic school which offers both primary and junior high education for both boys and girls.

AIMS-Ghana, a tertiary education and research centre for the mathematical sciences, is located in Biriwa. The centre was launched in 2012 by the African Institute for Mathematical Sciences (AIMS), a non-profit pan-African network of post-graduate education centres in South Africa, Senegal, Tanzania, and Cameroon.
