= Abu Aiah Koroma =

Sierra Leonean politician (1928–2005)

Honorable Abu Aiah Koroma J.D.

Sierra Leone Minister of Parliamentary Affairs
- In office 1998–2002

Attorney General of Sierra Leone and minister of Justice
- In office 1967–1971

Sierra Leone Minister of Mineral Resources
- In office 1990–1992

Minister of Parliamentary and Political Affairs
- In office 1996–2002

Personal details
- Born: 26 November 1928 Kono District, British Sierra Leone
- Died: 6 March 2005 Freetown, Sierra Leone
- Party: All People's Congress (APC)
- Spouse: Danke Koroma
- Children: 4, including Sia Nyama Koroma
- Education: King's College, London University
- Profession: Lawyer, Attorney

Abu Aiah Koroma (26 November 1928 – 5 March 2005) was a lawyer and politician in Sierra Leone. Koroma began his political career as Attorney General in 1967 and 1968. He returned to government in 1976 when he became Managing Director of the National Diamond Mining Company until 1987. In 1991 and 1992, Koroma was the Minister of Mineral Resources. In 1996, he ran as the presidential candidate of the Democratic Centre Party and gained just 4.9% of the national vote in the initial round of voting. After Ahmed Tejan Kabbah won the presidency, Koroma was named Minister of Political and Parliamentary Affairs, which lasted until Kabbah's re-election in 2002. Koroma died in 2005, at the age of 76.
