= Edward Kargbo =

Sierra Leonean politician (born 1963)

Edward Kargbo (born January 24, 1963) is a politician in Sierra Leone. He ran for President in 1996 but lost with 2.1% of the national vote.

== See also ==
- Politics of Sierra Leone
