= John Oponjo Benjamin =

Sierra Leonean politician (born 1952)

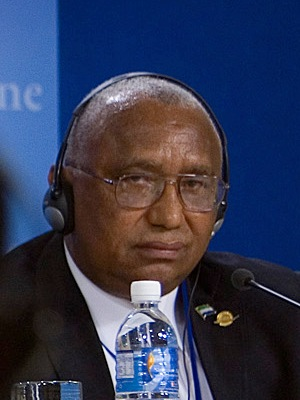

Minister of Finance of Sierra Leone
- In office September 2002 – 17 September 2007
- Preceded by: Joseph B. Dauda
- Succeeded by: David Carew

Personal details
- Born: November 29, 1952 (age 73) Segbwema, Kailahun District, British Sierra Leone
- Party: Sierra Leone People's Party (SLPP)

John Oponjo Benjamin (born 29 November 1952) is a Sierra Leonean economist and politician of Mende descent. He was the leader of the main opposition Sierra Leone People's Party (SLPP) to 2013. He served as Minister of Finance of Sierra Leone from 2002 to 2007. During that period, Benjamin helped lead Sierra Leone through the Paris Club's 100% debt cancellation program. Benjamin was the chairman of the Council of State Secretaries in 1992.
