= Andrew Turay =

Sierra Leonean politician

Presidential candidate of Sierra Leone

Personal details
- Party: Convention People's Party (2007); National People's Party (1996)
- Known for: 1996 and 2007 presidential candidate

Andrew Turay is a Sierra Leonean politician. He competed in the 1996 presidential election as part of the National People's Party (NPP). He received 0.5% of the vote (3,925 total votes).

Turay was the candidate for the Convention People's Party in the August 2007 presidential election. He received fourth place and 1.56% of the vote. In early September, prior to the second round of the election, he announced his support for Solomon Berewa of the Sierra Leone People's Party (SLPP).
