= Momodu Kargbo =

Sierra Leonean politician and economist

Momodu Kargbo is a Sierra Leonean politician and economist. He served as the Minister of Finance of Sierra Leone from 13 March 2016 to April 2018. Previously, he served as the governor of the Bank of Sierra Leone since 17 July 2014 until 2016.

Kargbo has degrees in economics and agriculture economics from Rutgers University. He also has an MBA from Texas A&M University.
