= Politics of Sierra Leone =

Sierra Leone is a country in West Africa, known officially as the Republic of Sierra Leone.

== Government of Sierra Leone ==
The government of Sierra Leone is the governing authority of the Republic of Sierra Leone, as established by the Sierra Leone Constitution. The Sierra Leone government is divided into three branches: the executive, legislative and the judicial. The seat of government of Sierra Leone is in the capital Freetown.

The Economist Intelligence Unit rated Sierra Leone a "hybrid regime" in 2022.

== Administrative divisions ==
Sierra Leone is divided into provinces, districts, and chiefdoms. Sierra Leone has 3 rural provinces, plus a capital city administrative province. There are then 14 districts - 12 rural, 2 for the capital Freetown.

Sierra Leone is further divided into 149 chiefdoms. The chiefdoms are hereditary, tribal units of local governance. The World Bank sponsored the creation of elected local councils in 2004.

== Political parties and elections ==
=== President ===
Incumbent president Julius Maada Bio was re-elected with 56% of the vote, a result which was contested by the main opposition party, the All People's Congress, which demanded a rerun, citing "glaring irregularities".

Candidate	Running mate	Party	Votes	%
Julius Maada Bio	Mohamed Juldeh Jalloh	Sierra Leone People's Party	1,566,932	56.17
Samura Kamara	Chernor Maju Bah	All People's Congress	1,148,262	41.16
Mohamed Bah	Mariatu Saudatu Turay	National Democratic Alliance	21,620	0.77
Charles Margai	Tony Hindolo Songa	People's Movement for Democratic Change	16,012	0.57
Nabieu Kamara	Saidu Mannah	Peace and Liberation Party	7,717	0.28
Abdulahi Saccoh	Alice Pyne	Revolutionary United Front	6,796	0.24
Prince Coker	Ibrahim Jalloh	People's Democratic Party	5,981	0.21
Iye Kakay	Ambrose Kobi	Alliance Democratic Party	4,336	0.16
Saa Kabuta	Gabriel Samuka	United National People's Party	4,059	0.15
Beresford Williams	Kadija Bangura	Republic National Independent Party	2,692	0.10
Mohamed Jonjo	Kaday Johnson	Citizen's Democratic Party	2,367	0.08
Mohamed Sowa-Turay	Olivette Walker	United Democratic Movement	1,665	0.06
Jonathan Sandy	Komba Mbawa	National Unity and Reconciliation Party	1,369	0.05
Total			2,789,808	100.00
Valid votes			2,789,808	99.61
Invalid/blank votes			10,883	0.39
Total votes			2,800,691	100.00
Registered voters/turnout			3,374,258	83.00

=== Parliament ===
The Sierra Leone People's Party won 81 seats in Parliament while the All People's Congress won 54 seats. The Sierra Leone People's Party did much better in the Kono District than it did in the previous election, winning seven of ten seats in this election after winning none in the district in the last election. It also made gains in northern and western Sierra Leone.

Party	Votes	%	Seats	+/–
Sierra Leone People's Party	1,578,259	56.68	81	+32
All People's Congress	1,113,882	40.00	54	–14
National Grand Coalition	18,169	0.65	0	–4
People's Movement for Democratic Change	17,390	0.62	0	0
National Democratic Alliance	3,819	0.14	0	0
Revolutionary United Front	1,502	0.05	0	0
Peace and Liberation Party	1,131	0.04	0	0
National Unity and Reconciliation Party	1,000	0.04	0	0
Republic National Independent Party	560	0.02	0	0
People's Democratic Party	516	0.02	0	0
Independents	48,464	1.74	0	−3
Paramount chiefs			14	0
Total	2,784,692	100.00	149	+3
Valid votes	2,784,692	99.60		
Invalid/blank votes	11,189	0.40		
Total votes	2,795,881	100.00		
Registered voters/turnout	3,374,258	82.86		

== See also ==
- List of ambassadors of Sierra Leone to Germany
- List of ambassadors of Sierra Leone to Russia
- Sierra Leone presidents and head of state by tribes
