= List of political parties in Sierra Leone =

This article lists political parties in Sierra Leone. Sierra Leone has a multi-party system, with two or three strong political parties and a third party that is electorally successful.

== Parties ==
=== Parliamentary parties ===
Party	Abbr.	Founded	Leader	Political position	Ideology	MPs
Sierra Leone People's Party	SLPP	1951	Julius Maada Bio	Centre to centre-left	Social democracy; Civic nationalism; Third Way	81 / 149
All People's Congress	APC	1960	Ernest Bai Koroma	Centre-left	African nationalism; Pan-Africanism	54 / 149

=== Other parties ===
- Coalition for Change (C4C)
- Grand Alliance Party (GAP)
- National Alliance Democratic Party (NADP)
- National Democratic Alliance (NDA)
- National Grand Coalition (NGC)
- National Unity and Reconciliation Party (NURP)
- Peace and Liberation Party (PLP)
- People's Democratic Party (PDP)
- People's Movement for Democratic Change (PMDC)
- Republic National Independent Party (ReNIP)
- Revolutionary United Front (RUF)
- Sierra Leone People's Party (SLPP)
- United National People's Party (UNPP)
- Unity for National Development (UND)
- Unity Party (UP)
- Young People's Party (YPP)
- Alliance Democratic Party (ADP)

== Ethnic groups and national politics ==
The largest contest within Sierra Leone's political culture centres upon the competition between the ethnic Temne in Sierra Leone's north-west, and the Mende in Sierra Leone's south-east.

The vast majority of the Mende support the Sierra Leone People's Party (SLPP). The majority of the Temne support the All People's Congress (APC).

== See also ==
- Politics of Sierra Leone
- List of political parties by country
