= Abortion in Sierra Leone =

In Sierra Leone, abortion is a criminal offence. Its abortion law does not specify any grounds for legal abortion. It is unclear whether abortion is permitted to save the life of the mother, as a British judicial decision allowing such abortions is untested in Sierra Leone. (Note: Some sources say abortion is illegal under any circumstances. Some say it is only legal to save the life of the mother.) Abortion is covered in the country's medical code of ethics, but there is no government training for providers. Prosecution of abortion is uncommon.

Abortion is illegal under an 1861 British law, though the British colonial government never officially codified an abortion law. In the 2010s and 2020s, activists, politicians, and international organizations supported proposals to legalise abortion. Religious groups have supported the ban. Sierra Leone ratified the Maputo Protocol in 2015. A bill allowing abortion, first raised in 2010, was approved by Parliament after being introduced by Isata Kabia in 2015. The bill failed as President Ernest Bai Koroma refused to sign it. This law was heavily debated despite a stigma against the subject. In 2022, the government of Julius Maada Bio backed a new reproductive health bill that would lift the abortion ban.

Unsafe abortions are a major factor in Sierra Leone's maternal mortality rate, one of the highest in the world. Post-abortion care is available, primarily using the dilation and curettage method. The country has a stigma surrounding abortion, and many girls have little knowledge of it. Some rely on clandestine providers. Others acquire drugs for self-induced abortions without medical advice. Factors that motivate abortions include the inability to afford a baby, disapproval of the relationship by the family, and lack of contraceptives. Factors leading women not to have abortions include lack of knowledge and lack of access to providers.

== Legislation ==
The abortion ban in Sierra Leone has not been modified since the British colonial era. The Offences Against the Person Act 1861, an act of the British Parliament grouped with the Criminal Law Consolidation Acts 1861, criminalises acts performed to terminate a pregnancy. Sierra Leone is the only former British colony to still apply this act. The law does not specify any grounds for legal abortion. The British judicial decision Rex v Bourne on the same law's application found that it permits abortions to save the life of the mother. This has not been brought up in Sierra Leone's courts, so it is unclear whether such abortions are permitted.

Public-sector health providers do not have training or guidelines about providing abortions. Sierra Leone's medical code of ethics addresses abortion, and a WHO survey in 2021 found that the country's health benefit package included abortion. The National Protocols and Guidelines for Emergency Obstetric and Newborn Care (2018) sanction post-abortion care using misoprostol. Private organizations have legally imported abortion drugs, but distribution is legally limited.

Due to the stigma, abortion cases are resolved within families, and are only pursued in court if they result in death, according to AdvocAid. Nurses have been charged with manslaughter for aiding in abortions that resulted in death. In January 2011, a pregnant woman with heavy bleeding was detained for allegedly having an abortion and was released after proof that she was still pregnant.

== History ==
During the British colonial era, Sierra Leone lacked an official abortion law and was subject to English common law. The Offences Against the Person Act 1861, an act of the British Parliament grouped with the Criminal Law Consolidation Acts 1861, criminalises acts performed to terminate a pregnancy. This law was in effect in Sierra Leone, while common law applied to an unclear extent. It is unclear whether Sierra Leone applied a common law principle that permitted abortions before the quickening of the pregnancy. It is also unclear whether Sierra Leone applied the decision of Rex v Bourne, permitting life-saving abortions.

In July 2015, Sierra Leone became a party to the Maputo Protocol, which includes provisions about abortion. Members of parliament heavily debated the ratification. Opponents said that the protocol was an example of Western imperialist morality and that a policy against abortion defended Sierra Leone's cultural sovereignty.

=== Safe Abortion Act (2015–2016) ===
In 2010, the Planned Parenthood Association of Sierra Leone introduced the Medical Termination of Pregnancy Bill, which was renamed to the Termination of Pregnancy Bill before becoming the Safe Abortion Act. Activists and organizations such as Marie Stopes International (MSI) began advocating for reform. The People's Alliance for Reproductive Health Advocacy, an advocacy coalition that campaigns for safe abortion and reproductive education, was established that year.

After the 2012 Sierra Leonean general election, activists called for the new parliament to pass the bill. Supporters cited that few could afford the cost of 200,000 leones (US$46) for certified abortions and that between 4 and 10 percent of abortion recipients required surgical procedures. Most health and legal professionals supported easing abortion laws, according to a survey by the Ministry of Health.

The Safe Abortion Act was introduced to the Parliament of Sierra Leone by Isata Kabia of the ruling All People's Congress. The Ministry of Social Welfare, Gender and Children's Affairs supported the law under Minister Moijueh Kaikai and later under Kabia, who became Acting Minister in March 2016. On 8 December 2015, the Parliament unanimously passed the act.

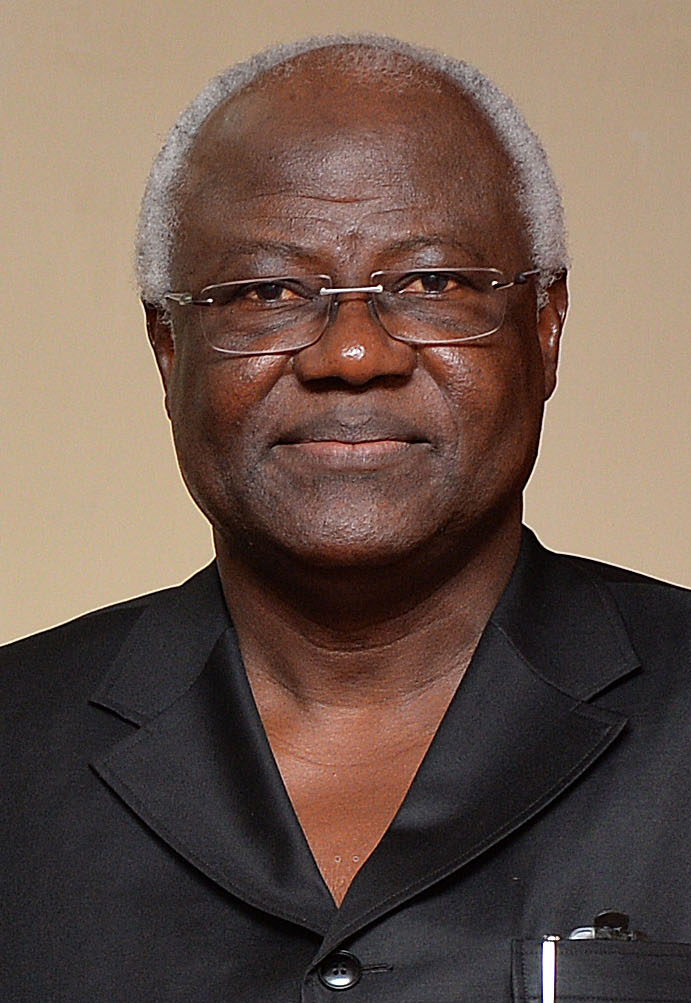
President Ernest Bai Koroma declined to sign the Safe Abortion Act in 2016, despite his previous support.

The passed law allowed abortion during the first twelve weeks of pregnancy on request or twenty-four weeks in cases of pregnancy from rape or incest or risk to the health of the mother or fetus. It said minors could have abortions with parental consent. It mandated a four-year jail sentence for conducting unlicensed abortions.

President Ernest Bai Koroma and First Lady Sia Koroma initially supported the bill's introduction, and the public expected it to pass. Meetings with religious groups and widespread anti-abortion protests influenced his opposition to the law. Koroma asked for Parliament to review the law since the Maputo Protocol only provided for abortion in cases of rape and medical emergencies. In an address on International Women's Day, he argued that the law violated the right to life and that it did not clearly define its scope. Opposition politicians claimed that Koroma was building up support ahead of the upcoming election and that he planned to negate the term limit to run for another term. Koroma refused to sign the bill and sent it back to parliament on 6 January 2016.

While the votes for the bill were higher than the two-thirds majority needed to overrule a presidential veto, the speaker of the house refused to give the bill his assent, so it did not pass. Parliament returned the unchanged bill to the president on 11 February. Koroma blocked the bill again and referred it to the Constitutional Review Committee, saying that the abortion law should be included in changes to the Constitution that would be put to a referendum.

==== Public opinion on the Safe Abortion Act ====
Public opinion in Sierra Leone was against the bill. Some groups called for the withdrawal of the bill due to Christian and Islamic beliefs that condemn abortion. Opponents included the Inter-Religious Council of Sierra Leone (IRCSL) and the country's Pentecostal church. The IRCSL was influenced by the Catholic Church, which argued that abortion violated a clause in the Constitution that said, "No person shall be deprived of his life intentionally". The president of the IRCSL, Sheikh Abu Bakarr Conteh, said that the law should consider the rights of the sexual partner and the family of the woman getting an abortion. In January 2016, religious groups led a protest in which hundreds of people marched to the House of Parliament. Catholic leaders voiced opposition to the law more frequently than Muslim leaders. Supporters of the bill believed that opponents were influenced by American religious leaders and a member of the United States Congress.

Proponents of the bill said that unsafe abortions were a large contributor to maternal mortality in Sierra Leone, which was the highest in the world, and that the law would support victims of rape and sexual violence. Groups such as AdvocAid said that the anti-abortion law was largely unenforced yet led to unsafe abortions being common. In January 2016, alongside the anti-abortion protest, dozens of people, mostly middle-class women, attended a demonstration in support of the proposal. The following week, three letters urged Koroma to approve the bill. One by the International Campaign for Women's Right to Safe Abortion received over 200 signatures. Another letter was sent on 4 February by Human Rights Watch, Amnesty International, and the Sierra Leonean organizations 50/50, AdvocAid, Centre for Accountability and Rule of Law, Ipas Sierra Leone, and Wi Di Uman Dem Coalition. Human rights leaders who called for Koroma to sign the bill included the African Commission on Human and Peoples' Rights's special rapporteur on women's rights, Lucy Asuagbor, and the United Nations Special Rapporteur on Violence Against Women, Dubravka Šimonović. The U.S.–based organization Ipas was a long-term proponent of abortion law reform. It faced criticism for its influence on the Ministries of Social Welfare and Justice.

Supporters of the decriminalization of abortion were divided over the act's support of on-demand abortions. Anti-abortion activists raised concerns that Sierra Leone lacked the medical facilities to perform abortions. The group representing Sierra Leone's female lawyers made a statement advocating for legalizing abortion with restrictions and for the training of nurses.

=== Safe Motherhood and Reproductive Health Bill (2022–2025) ===
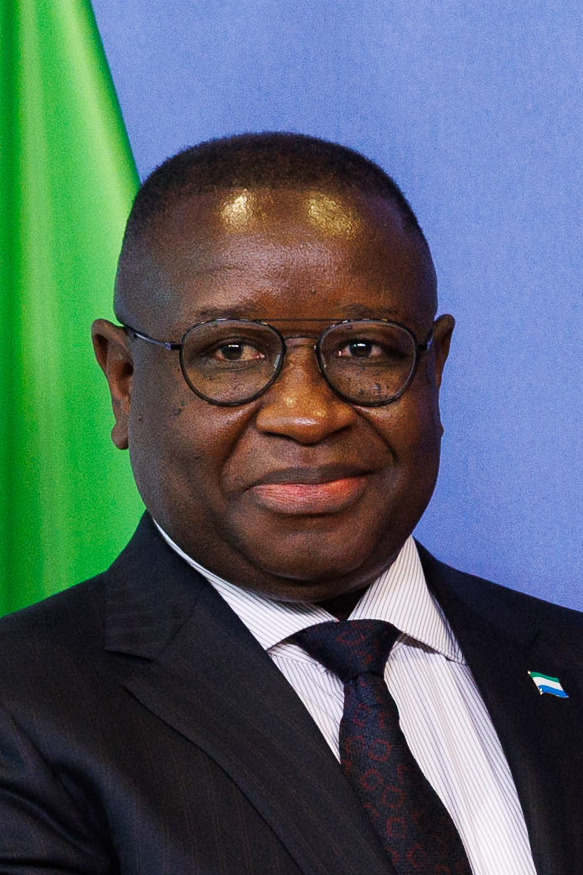
President Julius Maada Bio and his cabinet proposed the Safe Motherhood and Reproductive Health Bill in 2022.

The Cabinet of President Julius Maada Bio backed the Safe Motherhood and Reproductive Health Bill to decriminalise abortion. Bio announced his plan on 1 July 2022, at the 10th Africa Conference on Sexual Health and Rights in Freetown, to the approval of the audience and the conference's organisers. He said at the conference, "At a time when sexual and reproductive health rights for women are either being overturned or threatened, we are proud that Sierra Leone can once again lead with progressive reforms. My government has unanimously approved a safe motherhood bill that will include a range of critical provisions to ensure the health and dignity of all girls and women of reproductive age in this country." The speech referred to the Supreme Court of the United States's recent decision to overturn the constitutional right to abortion.

The bill's provisions were drafted by government officials and women's rights groups including MSI. The bill included a constitutional right to abortion. It would permit abortions up to 14 weeks on demand and at any stage under certain conditions. It covered other aspects of reproductive health including maternal health, access to contraceptives, post-abortion care, and access to the healthcare system. The drafters hoped to pass the law by the end of 2022. Observers said that the bill would be difficult to pass ahead of the 2023 Sierra Leonean general election as members of Parliament would avoid the risk of losing support. By January 2025, the parliament was in favor of the law, supporting the terms of the Maputo Protocol.

Campaigners for the bill said unsafe abortions were the cause of 10% of the country's maternal deaths and a factor in the country's high rate of teenage pregnancy. The girls' rights group Purposeful called the decision "a monumental step forward" and the international feminist group Fòs Feminista wrote in a tweet, "A major victory for women and girls, won through the tireless organising of feminist movements." The American advocacy group African Population and Health Research Centre lobbied for the bill to be "fast-tracked". The United States government under Joe Biden supported the bill. The Embassy of the United States, Freetown, denied allegations that the United States threatened to withhold funding from the Millennium Challenge Corporation if the bill did not pass. A Republican member of the United States House of Representatives, Chris Smith, affirmed the allegations.

The law faced opposition from religious leaders and the largely conservative general public. Protests against the law began once it was announced. Some opponents said it was similar to the Safe Abortion Bill but used a less controversial name. The Africa Christian Professionals Forum urged the government to deny its passage, saying it violated the right to life. The Inter-Religious Council addressed the parliament on 30 December 2024 to discuss the extent of the bill. The government initiated a meeting with religious leaders; it reported that the meeting had reached a consensus but issued a correction after the Archbishop of Freetown, Edward Tamba Charles, said it had downplayed his opposition.

== Prevalence ==
The estimated abortion rate in Sierra Leone in 2015–2019 was 45 per 1,000 women, equating to 51% of unintended pregnancies or 45% of all pregnancies. This rose from 27 per 1,000 women (34% of unintended pregnancies or 27% of all pregnancies) in 1990–1994. The incidence of unintended pregnancies stayed about the same.

Unsafe abortions account for about 10% of maternal deaths in Sierra Leone. Among adolescents, nearly one-third of maternal deaths are caused by unsafe abortions. Girls often induce abortions using misoprostol, a drug that is available over-the-counter to treat stomach problems. Without medical advice, some of them take the drug too late, which leads to severe bleeding or fatal sepsis from being unable to remove the fetus. According to MSI, some pregnant girls ingest rat poison or put sharp objects in their uteri, ensuring that doctors will operate on them on the grounds that their life is threatened.

The typical cost of post-abortion care to treat complications ranges from $35 to $272. Dilation and curettage, a method not recommended by the World Health Organization, comprises 85% of post-abortion care. The health system costs of treating an unsafe abortion are twice that of performing a safe abortion.

=== Societal factors ===
Sierra Leone has a stigma surrounding abortion. Many teenage girls in Sierra Leone have little knowledge of pregnancy and feel ashamed to discuss abortion. In Freetown, they have access to midwives, but the stigma causes some to turn to unlicensed healthcare providers, who may perform unsafe abortions. The Safe Abortion Act became a popular topic of debate despite the stigma in West Africa.

Economic factors often motivate the decision to terminate pregnancies. Partners of women who get pregnant often cannot afford the cost of supporting women during pregnancy, especially for schoolgirls, whose partners are expected to provide for them. Some abortions are motivated by a stigma against unmarried parents. Parents and relatives often pressure couples to get abortions because they disapprove of the relationship, which is common for inter-ethnic couples, or because they want to avoid embarrassment. In other cases, friends and relatives convince couples not to get abortions, due to religious beliefs or commitment to caring for the baby. Many women do not follow through with abortions due to a lack of knowledge or a refusal from healthcare providers, who are mostly men. Sierra Leone's rate of contraceptive use is low, at 24% of women of reproductive age, as of 2019. Women who cannot access contraceptives may have unwanted pregnancies resulting in abortion. Rural areas have lower contraception use and higher rates of teenage pregnancy.

As of 2023, the most likely women to have abortions are those in the 45–49 age range, those who are employed, those who listen to the radio, and those with no children. As in most countries, women with primary and secondary education are more likely to have abortions. Unlike in most countries, unmarried women are less likely to have abortions.

== See also ==
- Abortion in Africa
- Health in Sierra Leone
- Women in Sierra Leone
