= 2018 Sierra Leonean general election =

- Presidential election
- 7 March 2018 (first round); 31 March 2018 (second round)
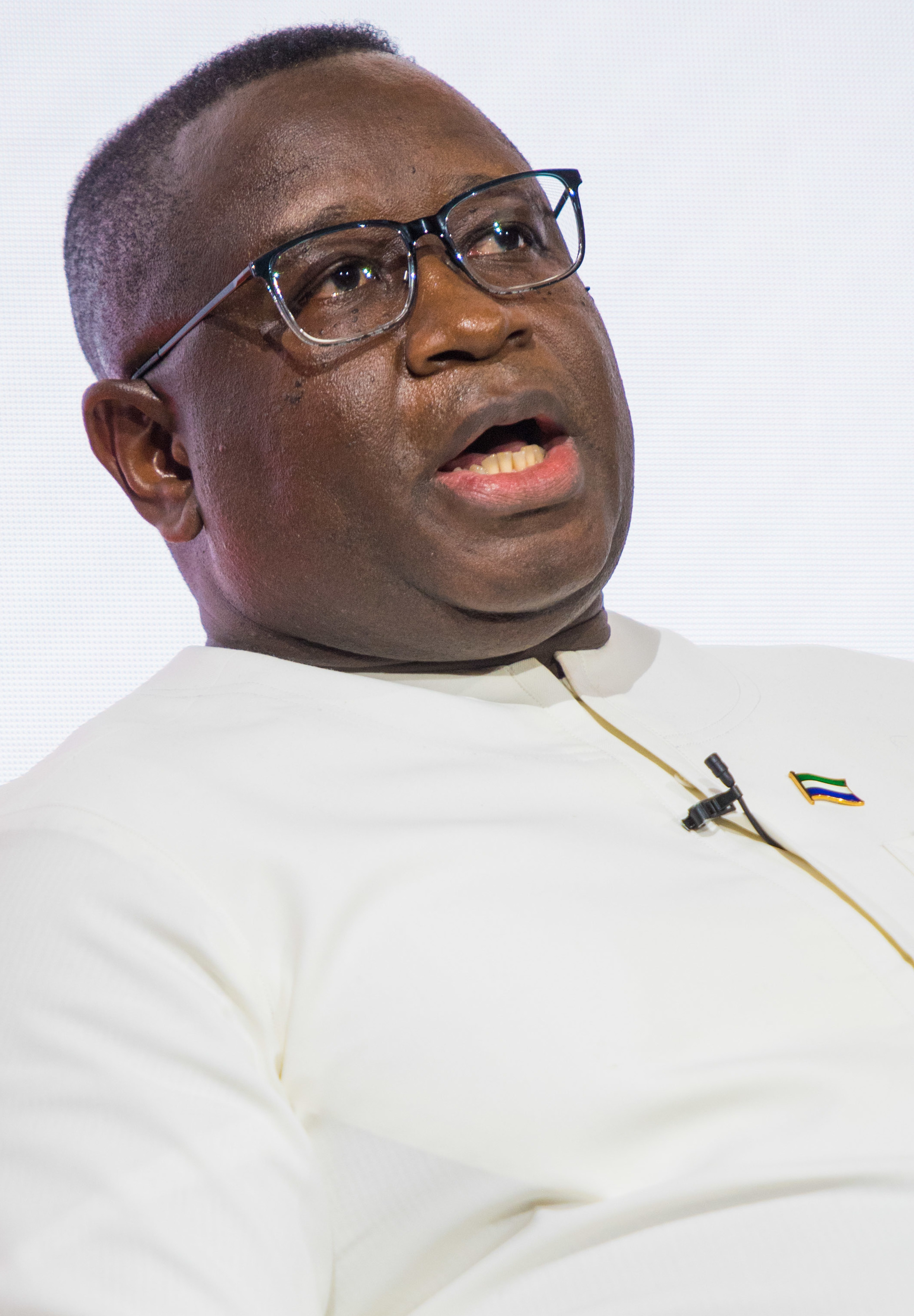

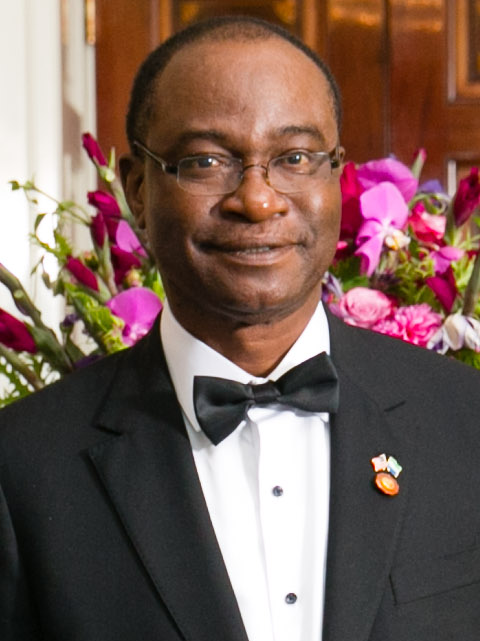
Nominee	Julius Maada Bio	Samura Kamara
Party	SLPP	APC
Running mate	Mohamed Juldeh Jalloh	Chernor Maju Bah
Popular vote	1,319,406	1,227,171
Percentage	51.81%	48.19%
- Results by district Bio: 80–90% 90+% Kamara: 50–60% 60–70% 80–90% 90+%
President before election
Ernest Bai Koroma
APC
Elected President
Julius Maada Bio
SLPP
- Parliamentary election
- 132 of 146 seats in Parliament
Party	Leader	Vote %	Seats	+/–
APC	Ernest Bai Koroma	39.93	68	+1
SLPP	Julius Maada Bio	38.93	49	+7
NGC	Kandeh Yumkella	8.69	4	New
C4C	Samuel Sam-Sumana	4.80	8	New
Independents	–	3.97	3	+3
This lists parties that won seats. See the complete results below.
Results by constituency

General elections were held in Sierra Leone on 7 March 2018 to elect the President, Parliament and local councils. Incumbent President Ernest Bai Koroma did not run for another term, as he was constitutionally ineligible, having served the maximum ten years in office.

No presidential candidate received the 55% of the vote required to win in the first round, meaning a second round of voting was held on 31 March between the top two candidates, opposition leader Julius Maada Bio of the Sierra Leone People's Party and Samura Kamara of the ruling All People's Congress; the two were separated by under 15,000 votes in the first round. Bio was subsequently elected with 51.8% of the vote. International observers hailed the election as being "orderly, free and fair" despite the fact it was "hotly contested."

== Electoral system ==
The President of Sierra Leone is elected using a modified two-round system, with a candidate having to receive more than 55% of the vote in the first round to be elected. If this is not achieved, a run-off will be held.

The 132 elected members of Parliament (increased from 112 in the 2012 elections) were elected from single-member constituencies by first-past-the-post voting. The remaining 14 seats are reserved for Paramount Chiefs, who are elected indirectly.

== Presidential candidates ==
A total of 16 candidates registered to contest the elections; 14 men and two women.

President Koroma personally selected foreign minister Samura Kamara as the All People's Congress candidate at the party's convention held on 15 November 2017 in the northern city of Makeni. The APC also selected deputy speaker of parliament Chernor Maju Bah as the party's vice presidential candidate.

The main opposition, the Sierra Leone People's Party (SLPP) selected former military Head of State, retired Brigadier general Julius Maada Bio as its presidential candidate at the party's national convention held on 15 November 2017 in Freetown. Bio's running mate was businessman Mohamed Juldeh Jalloh.

Former Vice President Samuel Sam-Sumana is the candidate of the Coalition for Change. His removal from office by President Koroma was challenged at the ECOWAS Court, which in November 2017 ruled that the removal of Sumana was illegal.

Former United Nations senior official Kandeh Yumkella was chosen to be the presidential candidate of the National Grand Coalition (NGC), a breakaway faction of the SLPP. Yumkella's running mate is mechanical engineer Andrew Keillie.

The newly formed Unity Party is fielding Femi Claudius Cole, one of two female presidential candidates.

Former Minister of Internal Affairs and Minister of Lands Musa Tarawally was nominated as the presidential candidate of the Citizens Democratic Party.

Party	Presidential candidate	Vice-Presidential candidate
All People's Congress	Samura Kamara	Chernor Maju Bah
Alliance Democratic Party	Mohamed Kamaraimba Mansaray	Isata Abdulai Kamara
Citizens Democratic Party	Musa Tarawally	Paul Alimamy Bangura
Coalition for Change	Samuel Sam-Sumana	David Bai Conteh
National Democratic Alliance	Mohamed Bah	Victoria Hunter
National Grand Coalition	Kandeh Kolleh Yumkella	Andrew Karmoh Keili
National Progressive Democrats	Patrick John O'Dwyer	Blanche Joko Samura
National Unity and Reconciliation Party	Jonathan Patrick Sandy	Safiatu Blango
Peace and Liberation Party	Kandeh Baba Conteh	Abu Bakarr Salaiman Tarawally
People's Movement for Democratic Change	Charles Francis Margai	Isata Dohra Bangura
Republic National Independence Party	Bresford Victor Williams	Septimus Mohamed Kemokai
Revolutionary United Front	Gbandi Jemba Ngobeh	Ansumama Mambu Porga Fowai
Sierra Leone People's Party	Julius Maada Bio	Mohamed Juldeh Jalloh
United Democratic Movement	Mohamed Sowa-Turay	Alex Brihim Matthew Kai Kai
United National People's Party	Saa Henry Kabuta	Benedit Lansana Kargbo
Unity Party	Femi Claudius Cole	Mohamed S.V Jr Tarawalley

== Controversy ==
Due to the fact that the election falls outside of the five-year term plus three months limit, constitutional lawyers have criticised the announcement.

=== Dual citizenship ===
The previously dormant issue of dual citizenship was raised during the election. The ruling party, APC, raised the issue citing Section 76(1) of the 1991 Constitution, which states that "No person shall be qualified for election as a Member of Parliament — if he is a naturalised citizen of Sierra Leone or is a citizen of a country other than Sierra Leone having become such a citizen voluntarily or is under a declaration of allegiance to such a country." The dual citizenship debate engulfed three presidential candidates: Kandeh Kolleh Yumkella of the National Grand Coalition (NGC), Samura Kamara of the All People's Congress (APC), and Mohamed Kamarainba Mansaray of the Alliance Democratic Party (ADP). Yumkella claimed he denounced his American citizenship in 2017, while Mansaray said he has never held any other citizenship. Two cases were brought to the Supreme Court: one filed on 5 February by an activist of the ruling All Peoples Congress party claiming that Yumkella is a naturalised citizen and therefore unqualified to contest the elections; and another filed by Charles Margai, a flag bearer for People's Movement for Democratic Change (PMDC), claiming that the APC’s standard bearer is unqualified to run for president because he is a dual citizen and did not resign his ministerial position – for which he was paid from the state’s consolidated revenue – long enough to meet the constitutional requirement. The defense of Yumkella appealed to the Supreme Court to have two of the judges removed from the case, then the matter was adjourned until 28 March (after the 7 March election) for the two new judges to study the case. The dual citizenship issue will be remembered by citizens for propagating the slang term two-SIM to describe a person with dual citizenship.

== Results ==
The National Electoral Commission reported 3,178,663 registered voters (of which 1,654,228 were female) and a voter turnout of 2,676,549 (84.2%) across 3,300 polling centres and 11,122 polling stations.

=== President ===
Candidate	Running mate	Party	First round		Second round	
Candidate	Running mate	Party	Votes	%	Votes	%
Julius Maada Bio	Mohamed Juldeh Jalloh	Sierra Leone People's Party	1,097,482	43.26	1,319,406	51.81
Samura Kamara	Chernor Maju Bah	All People's Congress	1,082,748	42.68	1,227,171	48.19
Kandeh Yumkella	Andrew Karmoh Keili	National Grand Coalition	174,014	6.86		
Samuel Sam-Sumana	David Bai Conteh	Coalition for Change	87,720	3.46		
Mohamed Kamaraimba Mansaray	Isata Abdulai Kamara	Alliance Democratic Party	26,704	1.05		
Gbandi Jemba Ngobeh	Ansumama Mambu Porga Fowai	Revolutionary United Front	12,827	0.51		
Musa Tarawally	Paul Alimamy Bangura	Citizens Democratic Party	11,493	0.45		
Charles Margai	Isata Dora Bangura	People's Movement for Democratic Change	9,864	0.39		
Mohamed Charnoh Bah	Victoria Hunter	National Democratic Alliance	8,344	0.33		
Mohamed Sowa-Turay	Alex Brihim Matthew Kai Kai	United Democratic Movement	5,695	0.22		
Patrick John O'Dwyer	Blanche Joko Samura	National Progressive Democrats	4,239	0.17		
Kandeh Baba Conteh	Abu Bakarr Salaiman Tarawally	Peace and Liberation Party	4,233	0.17		
Femi Claudius Cole	Mohamed S.V Jr Tarawalley	Unity Party	3,825	0.15		
Saa Henry Kabuta	Benedit Lansana Kargbo	United National People's Party	3,061	0.12		
Beresford Victor Williams	Septimus Mohamed Kemokai	Republic National Independent Party	2,555	0.10		
Jonathan Patrick Sandy	Safiatu Blango	National Unity and Reconciliation Party	2,318	0.09		
Total			2,537,122	100.00	2,546,577	100.00
Valid votes			2,537,122	94.79	2,546,577	98.77
Invalid/blank votes			139,427	5.21	31,694	1.23
Total votes			2,676,549	100.00	2,578,271	100.00
Registered voters/turnout			3,178,663	84.20	3,178,663	81.11
Source: NECSL, NECSL

==== By district ====
Second round
District	Samura		Bio	
District	Votes	%	Votes	%
Kenema District	27,308	11.45	211,232	88.55
Kono District	34,636	27.39	91,823	72.61
Kailahun District	13,343	10.04	119,502	89.96
Port Loko District	153,608	85.01	27,084	14.99
Kambia District	69,542	69.75	30,155	30.25
Karene District	73,514	88.94	9,146	11.06
Tonkolili District	143,500	86.32	22,748	13.68
Bombali District	144,056	90.68	14,807	9.32
Koinadugu District	40,210	67.91	19,004	32.09
Falaba District	22,562	57.23	16,862	42.77
Bo District	26,145	10.66	219,131	89.34
Moyamba District	21,045	17.91	96,456	82.09
Bonthe District	3,804	4.76	76,119	95.24
Pujehun District	6,701	8.39	73,121	91.61
Western Area Urban District	315,764	60.98	202,046	39.02
Western Area Rural District	131,433	59.31	90,170	40.69
Source: NECSL

=== Parliament ===
A total of 795 candidates contested the parliamentary elections, of whom 100 were female.

Party	Votes	%	Seats	+/–
All People's Congress	989,431	39.93	68	+1
Sierra Leone People's Party	964,659	38.93	49	+7
National Grand Coalition	215,315	8.69	4	New
Coalition for Change	119,006	4.80	8	New
Citizens Democratic Party	31,589	1.27	0	0
Alliance Democratic Party	19,849	0.80	0	New
People's Movement for Democratic Change	19,053	0.77	0	0
National Progressive Democrats	5,173	0.21	0	New
Unity Party	3,715	0.15	0	New
National Democratic Alliance	3,534	0.14	0	0
People's Democratic Party	2,428	0.10	0	0
Peace and Liberation Party	2,278	0.09	0	0
United Democratic Movement	1,645	0.07	0	0
Republic National Independent Party	678	0.03	0	New
United National People's Party	620	0.03	0	0
Revolutionary United Front	438	0.02	0	0
National Unity and Reconciliation Party	165	0.01	0	New
Independents	98,439	3.97	3	+3
Paramount chiefs			14	+2
Total	2,478,015	100.00	146	+14
Registered voters/turnout	3,178,663	–		
Source: EEAS, NECSL
