= 2023 Sierra Leonean general election =

- 24 June 2023
- Presidential election
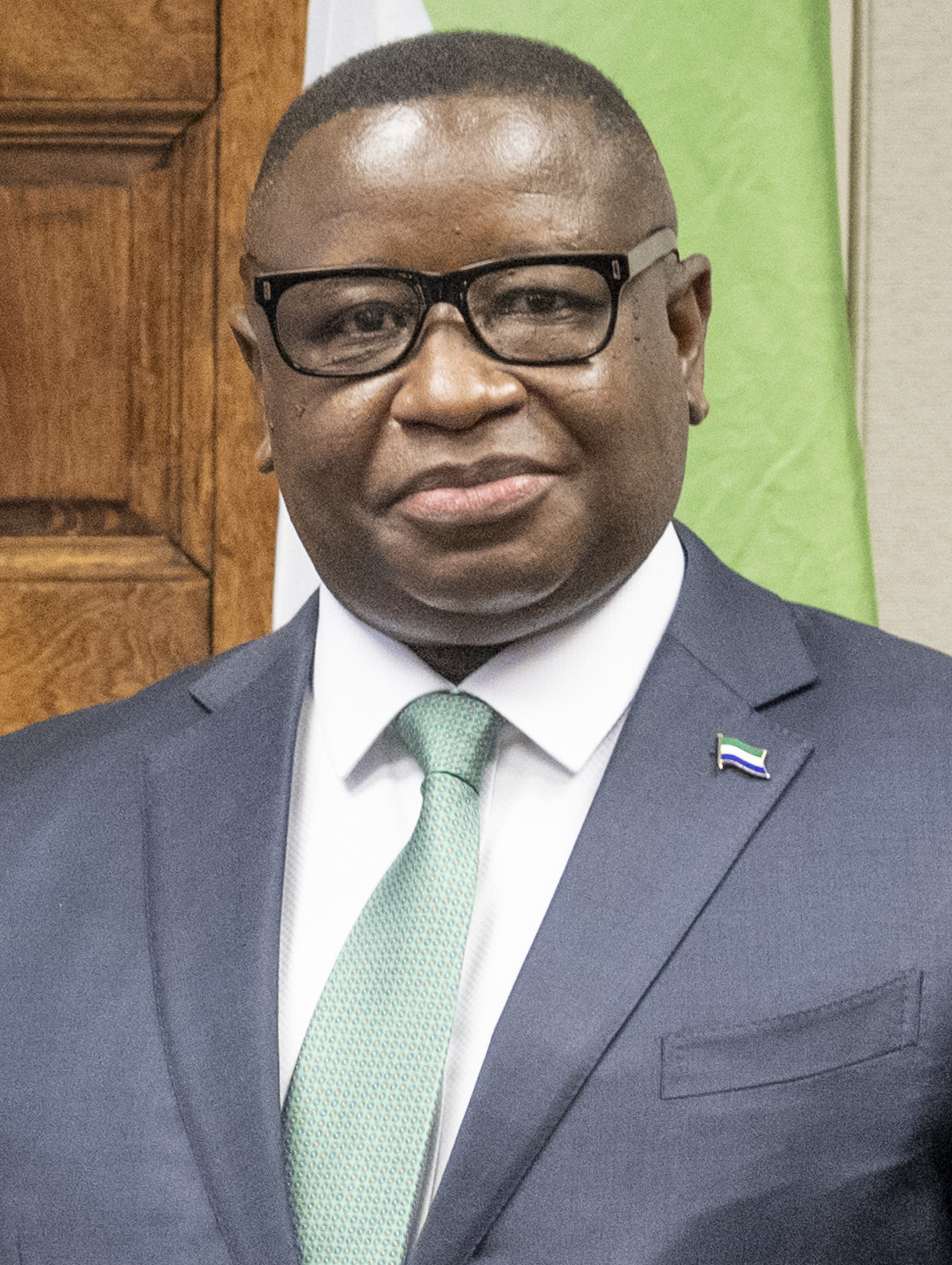

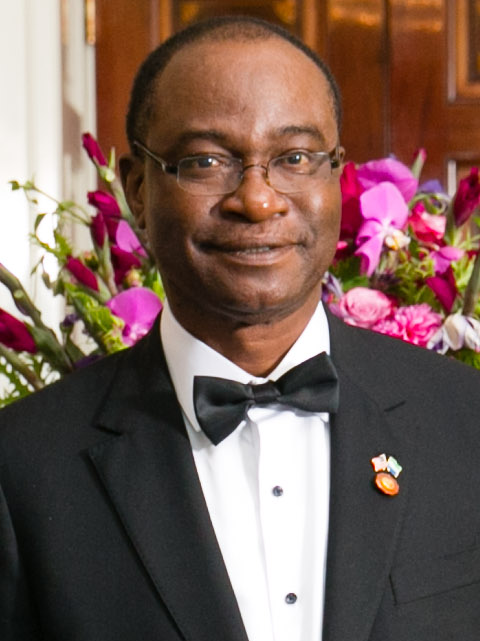
Nominee	Julius Maada Bio	Samura Kamara
Party	SLPP	APC
Running mate	Mohamed Juldeh Jalloh	Chernor Maju Bah
Popular vote	1,566,932	1,148,262
Percentage	56.17%	41.16%
- Parliamentary election
- 135 of the 149 seats in Parliament
Party	Leader	Vote %	Seats	+/–
SLPP	Julius Maada Bio	56.68	81	+32
APC	Ernest Bai Koroma	40.00	54	−14
This lists parties that won seats. See the complete results below.
Results by district
President before	President after
Julius Maada Bio; SLPP	Julius Maada Bio; SLPP

General elections were held in Sierra Leone on 24 June 2023 to elect the president and members of Parliament. Incumbent president Julius Maada Bio was re-elected with 56% of the vote and the Sierra Leone People's Party won 81 seats in Parliament compared to the main opposition party, the All People's Congress, which won 54 seats. The result was contested by the All People's Congress, which demanded a rerun, citing "glaring irregularities". European election observers stated that there were "statistical inconsistencies" in the presidential results published, with the European Union Election Observation Mission saying that the electoral commission should "publish disaggregated results data per polling station to allow for public scrutiny of the results." Unless that happened, it said that transparency was compromised. The Carter Center echoed these sentiments, as did the United States, Britain, Ireland, Germany, France and the European Union.

== Electoral system ==
=== President ===
The President of Sierra Leone is elected using a modified version of the two-round system, with a candidate having to receive more than 55% of the vote in the first round to be elected. If this is not done, a second round must be held two weeks after the announcement of the first-round result.

=== Parliament ===
Members of Parliament were elected in 16 multi-member constituencies (of between four and sixteen seats) coterminous with the Districts of Sierra Leone by proportional representation via the largest remainder method (with the Hare quota), after a presidential decree by Julius Maada Bio in October 2022 abolished the first-past-the-post system that had been used since 2008. Independent candidates are eligible to run and win seats if they exceed the quota required for one in a constituency. A total of 14 additional seats (one per district, excluding the two districts of the Western Area) are not elected, and are reserved for paramount chiefs.

The Supreme Court of Sierra Leone ruled that the decree changing the electoral system was constitutional in a case brought by opposition MP Abdul Kargbo and local councillor Hakiratu Maxwell-Caulker.

District	Elected Seats	Paramount Chiefs
Bo	12	1
Bombali	8	1
Bonthe	5	1
Falaba	4	1
Kailahun	10	1
Kambia	6	1
Karene	5	1
Kenema	12	1
Koinadugu	4	1
Kono	10	1
Moyamba	6	1
Port Loko	10	1
Pujehun	7	1
Tonkolili	10	1
Western Rural	10	0
Western Urban	16	0
Subtotal	135	14
Total	149	

== Results ==
=== President ===
Incumbent president Julius Maada Bio was re-elected with 56% of the vote, a result which was contested by the main opposition party, the All People's Congress, which demanded a rerun, citing "glaring irregularities".

Candidate	Running mate	Party	Votes	%
Julius Maada Bio	Mohamed Juldeh Jalloh	Sierra Leone People's Party	1,566,932	56.17
Samura Kamara	Chernor Maju Bah	All People's Congress	1,148,262	41.16
Mohamed Bah	Mariatu Saudatu Turay	National Democratic Alliance	21,620	0.77
Charles Margai	Tony Hindolo Songa	People's Movement for Democratic Change	16,012	0.57
Nabieu Kamara	Saidu Mannah	Peace and Liberation Party	7,717	0.28
Abdulahi Saccoh	Alice Pyne	Revolutionary United Front	6,796	0.24
Prince Coker	Ibrahim Jalloh	People's Democratic Party	5,981	0.21
Iye Kakay	Ambrose Kobi	Alliance Democratic Party	4,336	0.16
Saa Kabuta	Gabriel Samuka	United National People's Party	4,059	0.15
Beresford Williams	Kadija Bangura	Republic National Independent Party	2,692	0.10
Mohamed Jonjo	Kaday Johnson	Citizen's Democratic Party	2,367	0.08
Mohamed Sowa-Turay	Olivette Walker	United Democratic Movement	1,665	0.06
Jonathan Sandy	Komba Mbawa	National Unity and Reconciliation Party	1,369	0.05
Total			2,789,808	100.00
Valid votes			2,789,808	99.61
Invalid/blank votes			10,883	0.39
Total votes			2,800,691	100.00
Registered voters/turnout			3,374,258	83.00

=== Parliament ===
The Sierra Leone People's Party won 81 seats in Parliament while the All People's Congress won 54 seats. The Sierra Leone People's Party did much better in the Kono District than it did in the previous election, winning seven of ten seats in this election after winning none in the district in the last election. It also made gains in northern and western Sierra Leone.

Party	Votes	%	Seats	+/–
Sierra Leone People's Party	1,578,259	56.68	81	+32
All People's Congress	1,113,882	40.00	54	–14
National Grand Coalition	18,169	0.65	0	–4
People's Movement for Democratic Change	17,390	0.62	0	0
National Democratic Alliance	3,819	0.14	0	0
Revolutionary United Front	1,502	0.05	0	0
Peace and Liberation Party	1,131	0.04	0	0
National Unity and Reconciliation Party	1,000	0.04	0	0
Republic National Independent Party	560	0.02	0	0
People's Democratic Party	516	0.02	0	0
Independents	48,464	1.74	0	−3
Paramount chiefs			14	0
Total	2,784,692	100.00	149	+3
Valid votes	2,784,692	99.60		
Invalid/blank votes	11,189	0.40		
Total votes	2,795,881	100.00		
Registered voters/turnout	3,374,258	82.86		

== Conduct ==
European election observers stated that there were "statistical inconsistencies" in the presidential results published, with the European Union Election Observation Mission calling for the electoral commission to "publish disaggregated results data per polling station to allow for public scrutiny of the results," without which it said transparency was compromised. It said that there were discrepancies between the first and second batches of presidential results. The Carter Center echoed these sentiments, as did the United States, Britain, Ireland, Germany, France and the European Union. Sierra Leone's chief electoral commissioner, Mohamed Kenewui Konneh, said that it would take time to upload the disaggregated results to the internet.

The election itself was conducted largely peacefully according to observers from the Commonwealth of Nations, although one female nurse was killed at the headquarters of the All People's Congress after government forces fired shots and tear gas as voters awaited the announcement of the results. Other unconfirmed reports stated that others were also hurt or killed in the north of the country.

== See also ==
- List of elections in 2023
