= 2002 Sierra Leonean general election =

- 14 May 2002
- Presidential election
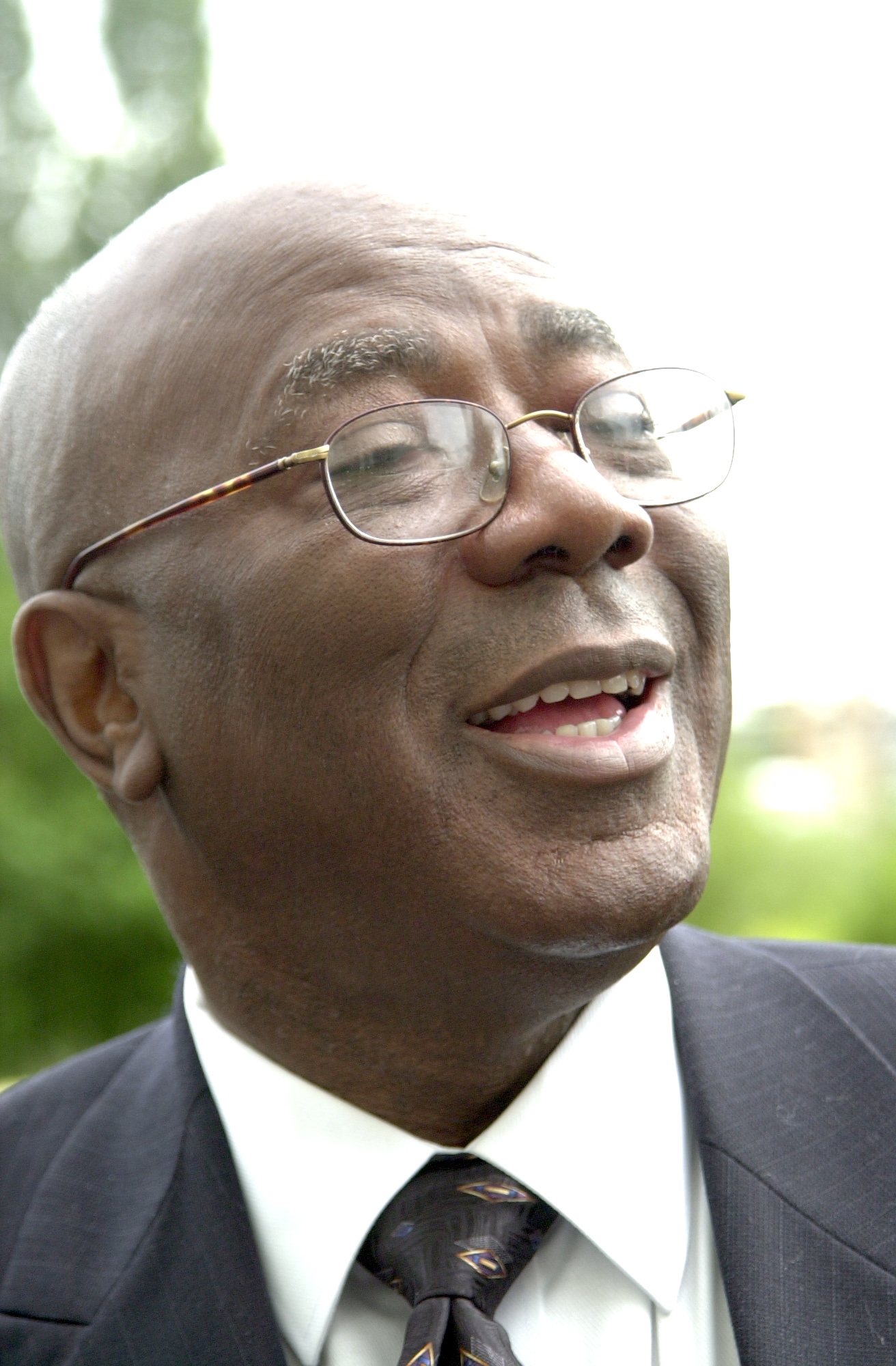

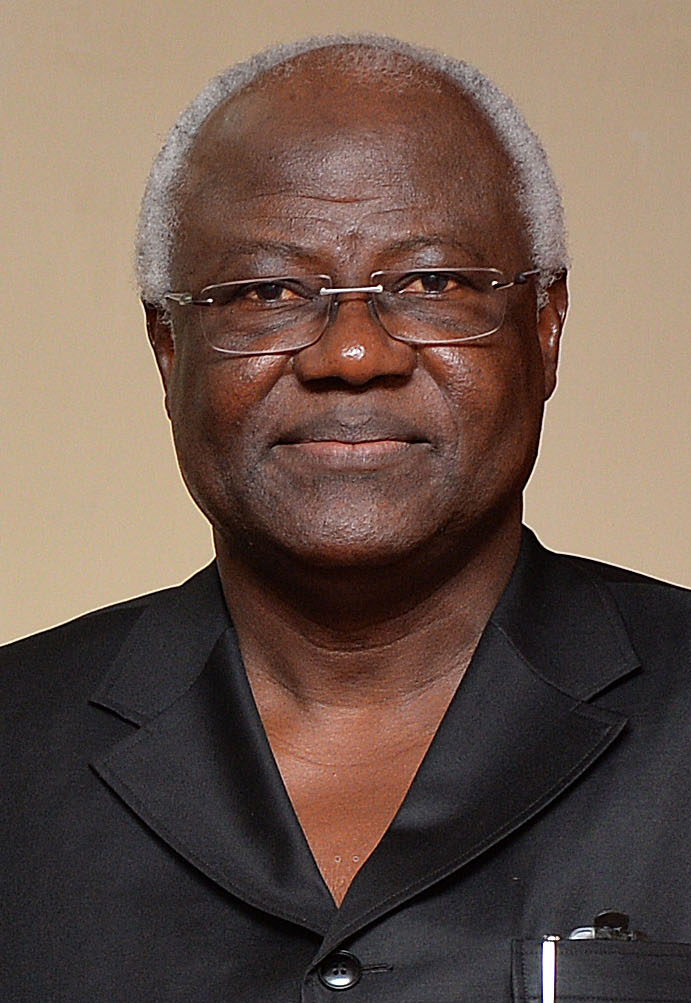
Nominee	Ahmed Tejan Kabbah	Ernest Bai Koroma
Party	SLPP	APC
Popular vote	1,336,423	426,405
Percentage	70.06%	22.35%
President before election
Ahmad Tejan Kabbah
SLPP
Elected President
Ahmed Tejan Kabbah
SLPP
- Parliamentary election
- 112 of 124 seats in Parliament
Party	Leader	Vote %	Seats	+/–
SLPP	Ahmed Tejan Kabbah	67.67	83	+56
APC	Ernest Bai Koroma	21.41	27	+22
PLP	Johnny Paul Koroma	3.65	2	New
This lists parties that won seats. See the complete results below.
Results by constituency

General elections were held in Sierra Leone on 14 May 2002 to elect a president and parliament. Incumbent President Ahmed Tejan Kabbah of the Sierra Leone People's Party (SLPP) was re-elected with more than 70% of the votes in the first round, meaning that a second round of voting was not required. In the parliamentary elections, the SLPP received almost 70% of the vote, winning 83 of the 112 seats. The All People's Congress became the main opposition party, replacing the United National People's Party.

The United Nations Mission in Sierra Leone was authorised, under Security Council Resolution 1389 (2002), to assist in the electoral process.

== Campaign ==
A total of 1,351 candidates contested the parliamentary elections, representing ten parties.

== Results ==
=== President ===
Candidate	Party	Votes	%
Ahmad Tejan Kabbah	Sierra Leone People's Party	1,336,423	70.06
Ernest Bai Koroma	All People's Congress	426,405	22.35
Johnny Paul Koroma	Peace and Liberation Party	57,233	3.00
Alimamy Pallo Bangura	Revolutionary United Front	33,074	1.73
John Karefa-Smart	United National People's Party	19,847	1.04
Raymond Kamara	Grand Alliance Party	11,181	0.59
Zainab Bangura	Movement for Progress	10,406	0.55
Raymond Bamidele Thompson	Citizens United for Peace and Progress	9,028	0.47
Andrew Turay	Young People's Party	3,859	0.20
Total		1,907,456	100.00
Registered voters/turnout		2,309,338	–
Source: Kandeh

=== Parliament ===
Party	Votes	%	Seats	+/–
Sierra Leone People's Party	1,293,401	67.67	83	+56
All People's Congress	409,313	21.41	27	+22
Peace and Liberation Party	69,765	3.65	2	New
Revolutionary United Front	41,997	2.20	0	New
Grand Alliance Party	25,436	1.33	0	New
United National People's Party	24,907	1.30	0	–17
People's Democratic Party	19,941	1.04	0	–12
Movement for Progress	15,036	0.79	0	New
National Democratic Alliance	6,467	0.34	0	0
Young People's Party	5,083	0.27	0	New
Paramount Chiefs			12	0
Total	1,911,346	100.00	124	+44
Registered voters/turnout	2,309,338	–		
Source: Kandeh
