= Amadu Jalloh =

Sierra Leonean politician

Alhaji Amadu Jalloh is a politician in Sierra Leone. He contested the 1996 presidential election as a member of the National Democratic Alliance, where he finished in 8th place with 2.3% of the first round voting. He ran again as the NDA candidate in the August 2007 presidential election, receiving 0.96% of the vote and fifth place.

On August 27, 2007, Jalloh announced his party's support for second place candidate Solomon Berewa of the ruling Sierra Leone People's Party (SLPP) in the second round of the election. He denounced claims that he had allied with the opposition All People's Congress (APC) based on a photograph of himself with APC leader Ernest Bai Koroma and People's Movement for Democratic Change (PMDC) leader Charles Margai, which he said was taken after a consultative meeting between the parties.
