= Moijueh Kaikai =

Sierra Leonean politician

Moijueh KaiKai

Sierra Leone Minister of Social Welfare, Gender and Children's Affairs
- Incumbent
- Assumed office 2013
- President: Ernest Bai Koroma
- Preceded by: Stephen Gaojia

Sierra Leone Resident Minister of the Southern Province
- In office December 3, 2010 – January 4, 2013
- Succeeded by: Muctarr Conteh

Sierra Leone Deputy Minister of Labour and Employment
- In office February 27, 2009 – December 3, 2010
- Succeeded by: Emmanuel Gaima

Personal details
- Born: Moijueh Emmanuel KaiKai Pujehun District, Sierra Leone
- Party: All People's Congress (APC)
- Education: Fourah Bay College

Alhaji Moijueh Emmanuel Kaikai is a Sierra Leonean politician and the Sierra Leone Minister of Social Welfare, Gender and Children's Affairs since 2013. He had previously served as the resident Minister of the Southern Province, and Deputy Minister of Labour.

KaiKai was one of the founding members of the People's Movement for Democratic Change (PMDC) political party in 2005, a breakaway faction of the Sierra Leone People's Party (SLPP). He later switched to the All People's Congress (APC).

Moijueh KaiKai is native of Pujehun District in Southern Sierra Leone. He is a devout muslim and a member of the Mende ethnic group.

== Early life and political career ==
Moijeh Kaikai was born and raised in Pujehun District in the Southern Province of Sierra Leone to ethnic Mende parents.

KaiKai was one of the founding members of the People's Movement for Democratic Change (PMDC) political party led by Charles Margai in 2005, a breakaway faction of the Sierra Leone People's Party (SLPP). He later switched to the All People's Congress (APC).

KaiKai served as Sierra Leone Deputy Minister Labour and Employment from February 27, 2009, to December 3, 2010, in the government of Sierra Leone's President Ernest Bai Koroma. He was moved to Resident Minister of the Southern Province from December 3, 2010, to January 4, 2013. He was appointed Minister of Social Welfare, Gender and Children's Affairs On January 4, 2013, by Sierra Leone's president, Ernest Bai Koroma. He was sacked in March 2016.
