= 2012 Sierra Leonean general election =

- 17 November 2012
- Presidential election
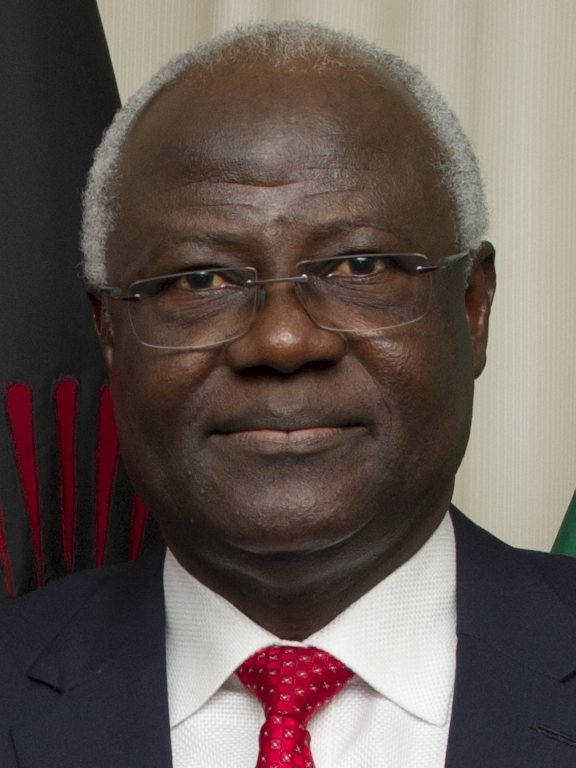

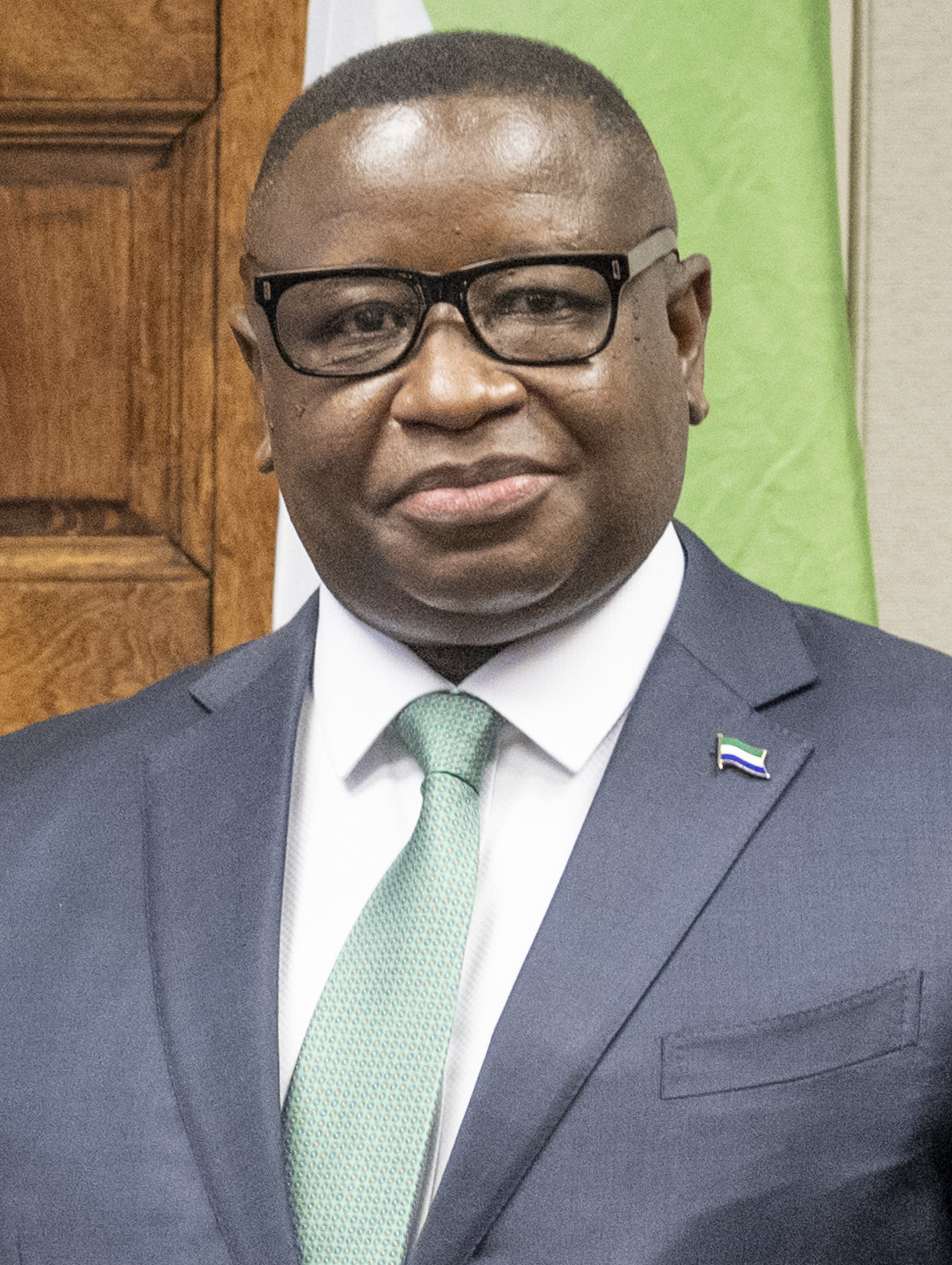
| Nominee | Ernest Bai Koroma | Julius Maada Bio |
| Party | APC | SLPP |
| Running mate | Samuel Sam-Sumana | Kadi Sesay |
| Popular vote | 1,314,881 | 819,185 |
| Percentage | 58.65% | 37.36% |
- Results by district
President before election
Ernest Bai Koroma
APC
Elected President
Ernest Bai Koroma
APC
- Parliamentary election
- 112 of the 124 seats in Parliament
| Party | Leader | Vote % | Seats | +/– |
|---|---|---|---|---|
| APC | Ernest Bai Koroma | 53.67 | 67 | +8 |
| SLPP | Julius Maada Bio | 38.25 | 42 | −1 |
This lists parties that won seats. See the complete results below.
Results by constituency

General elections were held in Sierra Leone on 17 November 2012. The result was a sweeping victory for the ruling All People's Congress. Its leader, incumbent president Ernest Bai Koroma, won 58.7% of the vote, enough to win a second term without the need for a runoff. The APC also won 67 of the 112 elected seats in Parliament. To date, it is the APC's best showing at an election since the restoration of multiparty politics in 1991.

== Candidates ==
In April 2007, the APC endorsed incumbent Ernest Bai Koroma for a second term. He was challenged by former President and general Julius Maada Bio of the Sierra Leone People's Party. On July 31, 2011, Bio defeated Usman Boie Kamara for the party's nomination.

In the elections for the twelve Chief seats in Parliament, only four were contested.

== Results ==
=== President ===
Koroma won 59% of the vote in the first round, exceeding the 55 percent threshold required to win the presidency in a single round.

| Candidate | Party | Votes | % |
|---|---|---|---|
| Ernest Bai Koroma | All People's Congress | 1,314,881 | 58.65 |
| Julius Maada Bio | Sierra Leone People's Party | 837,517 | 37.36 |
| Charles Margai | People's Movement for Democratic Change | 28,944 | 1.29 |
| Joshua Albert Carew | Citizens Democratic Party | 22,863 | 1.02 |
| Eldred Collins | Revolutionary United Front | 12,993 | 0.58 |
| Gibrilla Kamara | People's Democratic Party | 8,273 | 0.37 |
| Kandeh Baba Conteh | Peace and Liberation Party | 6,144 | 0.27 |
| Mohamed Bangura | United Democratic Movement | 5,069 | 0.23 |
| James Obai Fullah | United National People's Party | 5,044 | 0.23 |
| Total | | 2,241,728 | 100.00 |
| Valid votes | | 2,241,728 | 95.37 |
| Invalid/blank votes | | 108,898 | 4.63 |
| Total votes | | 2,350,626 | 100.00 |
| Registered voters/turnout | | 2,692,635 | 87.30 |
Source: National Electoral Commission

==== By district ====
| District | Koroma | | Bio | |
| District | Votes | % | Votes | % |
|---|---|---|---|---|
| Kailahun District | 26,331 | 22.6 | 85,525 | 73.3 |
| Kenema District | 39,180 | 18.7 | 163,303 | 77.9 |
| Kono District | 67,238 | 58.2 | 42,912 | 37.1 |
| Bombali District | 176,023 | 93.2 | 8,249 | 4.4 |
| Kambia District | 88,597 | 82.0 | 14,083 | 13.0 |
| Koinadugu District | 89,282 | 86.4 | 8,333 | 8.1 |
| Port Loko District | 182,761 | 90.2 | 11,329 | 5.6 |
| Tonkolili District | 145,479 | 92.6 | 6,864 | 4.4 |
| Bo District | 36,575 | 16.7 | 169,254 | 77.1 |
| Bonthe District | 7,667 | 11.7 | 52,762 | 80.6 |
| Moyamba District | 28,703 | 26.2 | 71,587 | 65.3 |
| Pujehun District | 10,565 | 15.5 | 50,796 | 74.7 |
| Western Area Urban District | 315,071 | 71.4 | 120,646 | 27.3 |
| Western Area Rural District | 101,409 | 74.3 | 31,874 | 23.4 |
Source: National Electoral Commission

=== Parliament ===
| Party | Votes | % | Seats | +/– |
|---|---|---|---|---|
| All People's Congress | 1,149,234 | 53.67 | 67 | +8 |
| Sierra Leone People's Party | 819,185 | 38.25 | 42 | –1 |
| People's Movement for Democratic Change | 69,202 | 3.23 | 0 | –10 |
| National Democratic Alliance | 27,706 | 1.29 | 0 | 0 |
| Revolutionary United Front | 12,573 | 0.59 | 0 | New |
| United Democratic Movement | 11,771 | 0.55 | 0 | New |
| People's Democratic Party | 8,387 | 0.39 | 0 | New |
| Citizens Democratic Party | 7,446 | 0.35 | 0 | New |
| United National People's Party | 4,734 | 0.22 | 0 | 0 |
| Peace and Liberation Party | 2,330 | 0.11 | 0 | 0 |
| Independents | 28,914 | 1.35 | 0 | 0 |
| Paramount chiefs | | | 12 | 0 |
| Vacant seats | | | 3 | – |
| Total | 2,141,482 | 100.00 | 124 | 0 |
Source: National Electoral Commission

==== By-elections ====
Three seats were left vacant, with no election taking place in constituencies 5, 12 and 92 (Western Area Rural District). The election was delayed in Western Area Rural District due to the death of PMDC candidate, and a by-election was held on 9 February 2013. The result was a victory for the APC candidate, who received 61% of the vote.

== Aftermath ==
Results showed Koroma winning in the first round of voting, receiving 58.7% of the vote against 37.4% for the SLPP candidate, Bio. If he had received less than 55% of the vote, a second round would have been necessary. Following the announcement of results, Koroma was promptly sworn in for another term as President on 23 November 2012. He said that he would "continue to attract investment" and "continue to fight corruption".
