= Kandeh Baba Conteh =

Sierra Leonean politician (born 1958)

Leader of the Peace and Liberation Party (PLP)

Personal details
- Born: 15 October 1958 (age 67) British Sierra Leone
- Party: Peace and Liberation Party (PLP)
- Education: Fourah Bay College
- Profession: Political scientist

Dr. Kandeh Baba Conteh (born 15 October 1958) is a Sierra Leonean politician and political scientist. He is the leader of the Peace and Liberation Party (PLP).

Conteh was appointed ambassador of the Armed Forces Revolutionary Council junta in 1997.

Conteh, as the PLP candidate, placed sixth in the presidential election held on August 11, 2007, receiving 0.57% of the vote. Following the first round, on August 27 Conteh announced his party's support for second place candidate Solomon Berewa of the ruling Sierra Leone People's Party (SLPP) in the second round of the election. With the All People's Congress (APC) of Berewa's rival, Ernest Bai Koroma, having already won a majority in the parliamentary election held concurrently with the first round, Conteh said that there would be "a better balance" for the country if the presidency and parliament were controlled by different parties.
