= Patrick Ojong =

Sierra Leonean politician and diplomat

Patrick George Ojong is a Sierra Leonean politician and diplomat, affiliated with the All People's Congress (APC).

Ojong served as Deputy Secretary-General of the World Federation of Democratic Youth, working at its headquarters in Budapest. In 1974 Ojong was appointed by the UN Secretary-General to the Ad Hoc Advisory Group on Youth, in which he served as rapporteur. He served as the deputy-general secretary of the National Youth League.

In the early 1980s Ojong was recalled from Budapest to work in the APC headquarters. He served as a Central Committee of the APC. Ojong was placed in charge of the International Department of the party. In the internal rifts inside the APC, Ojong was a key advocate for a strong party structure and held pro-Soviet positions. He came to hold the post of Assistant Secretary of the party.

In 1990 he was named High Commissioner to The Gambia.

Ojong went into exile during the NPRC junta rule. He moved to the United States, where he remained active in APC politics. The APC North America branch was founded at Ojong's residence in Gaithersburg, Maryland in the 1990s.
