= Usman Boie Kamara =

Sierra Leonean politician, businessman and mining engineer

Alhaji Usman Boie Kamara
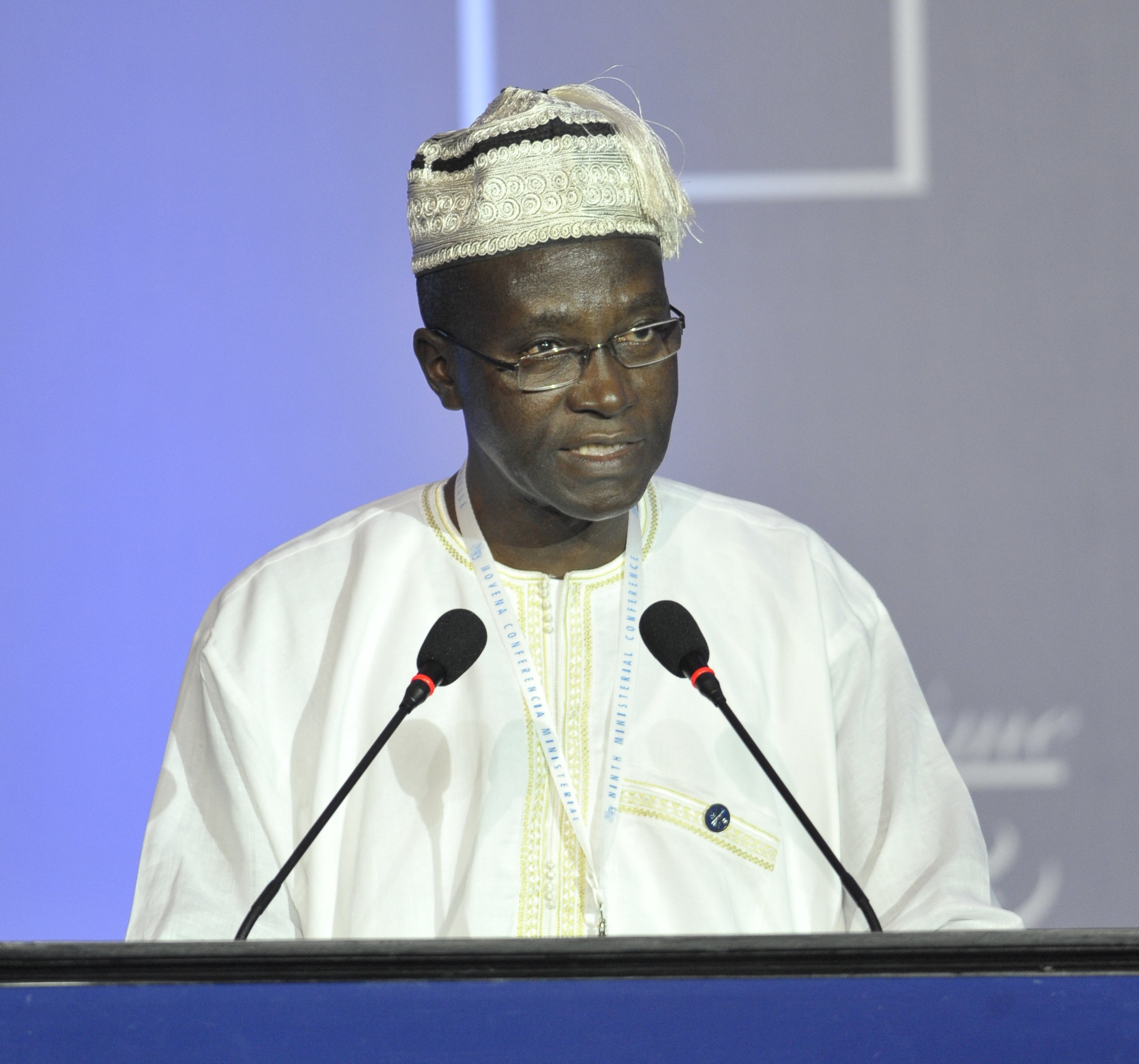
- Usman Boie Kamara at a WTO conference in Bali, December 2013

Minister of Trade and Industry
- Incumbent
- Assumed office 16 January 2013
- Preceded by: Richard Konteh

Personal details
- Born: 2 January 1949 Freetown, Sierra Leone
- Died: 11 December 2020 (aged 71) London
- Party: Sierra Leone People's Party (SLPP) (until 2012); All People's Congress (APC) (2012–2020)
- Children: 3
- Education: Imperial College London
- Profession: Mining engineer, businessman

Alhaji Usman Boie Kamara (2 January 1949 — 11 December 2020) was a Sierra Leonean politician, businessman and mining engineer. He became Minister of Trade and Industry of Sierra Leone in 2013, having previously worked as director of the Sierra Leone National Diamond Mining Company (NDMC).

Born and raised in Freetown to ethnic Mandingo parents, Usman Boie graduated witu a master's degree in mining engineering and Mineral Production management from Imperial College London.

His father Mohamed Boie Kamara was a prominent member of the Sierra Leone People's Party (SLPP) and served as the party's treasurer during the late 1960s and early 1970s. Mohamed Boie Kamara was also a close ally of Prime Minister Albert Margai.

Usman Boie Kamara unsuccessfully sought the nomination of the SLPP for the 2012 presidential election, placing second behind former military ruler Julius Maada Bio, who won the SLPP nomination at the party's convention held on 31 July 2011 at the miatta hall in Freetown.

After he lost the SLPP nomination to Julius Maada, Usman Boie Kamara defected from the SLPP in June 2012 and joined the ruling APC. He was officially welcomed and given an APC membership card by President Ernest Bai Koroma himself.

Usman Boie was a devout Muslim and a fluent speaker of his native Mandinka language. He was married and had three children.

== Early life and family background ==
Alhaji Usman Boie Kamara was born and raised in Freetown, the capital of Sierra Leone to prominent Mandingo parents and grew up in the neighbourhood of Magazine Cut in the East End of Freetown. Raised in a Mandingo family, he was a fluent speaker of the Mandinka language.

Usman Boie's father Mohamed Boie Kamara was a wealthy businessman and a popular member of the Sierra Leone People's Party (SLPP), serving as the treasurer of the party during the 1960s and 1970s. Mohamed Boie Kamara worked closely with other respected SLPP members including Albert Margai, Kande Bureh, Mohamed Sanusi Mustapha, and Alhaji A.B Tejan Jalloh to ensure the SLPP's victory in national and local elections across the country. As a young boy, Usman Boie traveled with his father to attend SLPP meetings, conventions and activities across Sierra Leone. When Prime Minister Albert Margai visited the Madingo Mosque in Freetown in 1965 for Friday prayer, it was Mohamed Boie Kamara who introduced him to the Muslim crowd.

== Education and career ==
Usman Boie Kamara is a graduate of the Prince of Wales Secondary school in Freetown. He later won a scholarship to study at Imperial College London in England. After completing his master's degree in mining engineering and Mineral Production Management, Usman Boie was employed by the government of Sierra Leone as a mining engineer in Kenema in 1972 under the Ministry of Mines and Mineral Resources. Boie Kamara quickly rose to Assistant Director of Mines, Deputy Director of Mines and finally, Director of Mines in 2008.

Usman Boie was later appointed as general manager of the Sierra Leone National Diamond Mining Company (NDMC), spending three years in the position. Usman Boie's greatest achievement in the position was the development of the Kimberley Process Certification Scheme (KPCS), a scheme designed to distinguish and certify Sierra Leone's rough diamonds from blood diamonds. Usman also acted as a mining consultant to the United Kingdom, Botswana, Zambia and Lesotho.

== Political career ==
Usman Boie Kamara unsuccessfully sought the nomination of the SLPP for the 2012 presidential election, placing second behind former military ruler Julius Maada Bio, who won the SLPP nomination at the party's convention held on 31 July 2011 at the miatta hall in Freetown.

After losing the election to Julius Maada Bio on 31 July 2011, there were great division among SLPP supporters and within the SLPP party itself. Some SLPP officials, including the SLPP chairman of the Western Area branch Lansana Fadika, the party's young generation leader Blamoh Robert and regional Secretary Alpha Mohamed Alghali resigned from the party in protest at Bio's nomination. Some of Usman Boie's supporters called for him to leave the SLPP and form his own party to challenge President Ernest Bai Koroma.

However, on 4 September 2011 Usman Boie delivered a speech in front of 15,000 of his supporters and senior members of the SLPP at the Attouga Stadium in Freetown. In his speech, he called for unity within the SLPP and gave his full support to Maada Bio ahead of the 2012 presidential election. Usman Boie stated that nothing would stop the SLPP from winning the 2012 elections and party members should be focused on how to win the 2012 elections. Osman Boie focused his speech on criticising President Koroma's government.

In June 2012, Usman Boie Kamara surprisingly defected from the SLPP and joined the ruling APC. He was officially welcomed and given an APC membership card by President Koroma himself.

In January 2013, Usman Boie Kamara was chosen by President Koroma to serve as Minister of Trade and Industry in his new second term cabinet. He was approved by the Sierra Leone House of Parliament on 15 January 2013 and was sworn in as Minister of Trade and Industry on 16 January 2013 at State House in Freetown.

== Death ==
Kamara died in London on 11 December 2020.
