= Young People's Party =

Young People's Party may refer to:

- Young People's Party (Sierra Leone), a political party in Sierra Leone
- Young People's Party (Austria), the youth wing of the Austrian People's Party
- Party of Young People, a political party in Romania

== See also ==
- People's Party (disambiguation)
