= National Grand Coalition =

Political party in Sierra Leone

The National Grand Coalition (NGC) is an opposition political party in Sierra Leone.

== History ==
The party was founded in 2017. They won four seats in the 2018 general election, but lost them all in the 2023 general election. An alliance was formed between the NGC and the ruling Sierra Leone People's Party. This was following many resignations from the party.

== Election results ==
=== Parliament ===
Election	Votes	%	Seats	+/–
2018	215,315	8.69	4	New
2023	18,169	0.65	0	–4

=== President ===
Election	Candidate	Running mate	First round	
Election	Candidate	Running mate	Votes	%
2018	Kandeh Yumkella	Andrew Karmoh Keili	174,014	6.86

== See also ==
- List of political parties in Sierra Leone
