= Isata Kabia =

Sierra Leonean politician

- Born: 1972 (age 53–54); Freetown, Sierra Leone
- Education: University of Milan
- Occupation: politician
- Known for: Sierra Leone Minister
- Political party: All People's Congress party

Isata Bussoh Kabia (born 1972 in Freetown) is a Sierra Leonean politician for the All People's Congress party. She has served in the national parliament, the Pan African Parliament and as a government minister.

== Life ==
Kabia was born in Freetown, Sierra Leone. She had an unusual early life as her parents left her and her younger brother with her grandmother in Lunsar when she was three, so that they could establish a life in Britain. They did not return until she was eight by which time she was very attached to her grandmother. They took her and her brother back to the UK and she spent some time having to readjust to her re-united family.

She was homesick for Sierra Leone and her grandmother and her parents paid for to have a vacation in Lunsar. She realised that she was living a very different life in England to her former peers and she and her English schoolmates became involved in fundraising even before the Sierra Leone Civil War began in 1991. Kabia would take holiday jobs to pay for her later visits to Sierra Leone. She graduated in biochemistry in England before she went to America. In the USA she organised a group called African Women of Substance who raised funds and conducted protests.

She later took an MBA with the University of Milan.

She is supported by Vital Voices as an "Engage Fellow" and by the Ellen Johnson Sirleaf Foundation as an Amujae Leader.

She was working in the office of her country's president as an advisor on diaspora affairs until she decided to be the first woman to contest the Port Loko District constituency. In the 2012 Sierra Leone election she gained nearly 90% of all the votes. She stood for the All People's Congress party.

She became the Rapporteur of the Pan African Parliament in May 2015. Later that year she made the media when she chose as her private members bill a Safe Abortion Bill.

In 2018, she was moved from being the Ministry of Foreign Affairs and International Cooperation to be the Minister of Social Welfare, Gender and Children's Affairs.

In 2018, her party named her as part of a group that would review the country's constitution and make it fit for purpose. Although the country was not scheduled to have new elections for five years her party wanted to suggest revisions to the constitution. The members chosen included Elvis Kargbo, Eddie Turay and Osman Foday Yansaneh, Abu Bakarr Kalokoh, Daniel Koroma, Africanus Sorie Sesay, Amadu Koroma, Ibrahim I. Mansaray, Dauda Kamara, Lansana Dumbuya, Lawyer Showers, Roland Nylander, Sulaiman Kabba Koroma, Warah Serry-Kamal and Sorie Tarawallie. The group had several more members and a draft was expected by the end of January 2019.
