= Dauda Kamara =

Sierra Leonean politician

Dauda Sulaiman Kamara (died in February 2024) is a Sierra Leonean politician. Kamara was selected to be Internal Affairs Minister under President Ernest Bai Koroma. He is a member of the All People's Congress from the Kambia District, one of only 3 APC Members of Parliament from that district. He is a member of the Parliament of Sierra Leone as well as the Pan-African Parliament.

In 2018 the All People's Congress party named a team who would review the country's constitution. Although the plan was to not have new elections for five years the party wanted to suggest a new constitution. The members chosen included Elvis Kargbo, Eddie Turay and Osman Foday Yansaneh, Abu Bakarr Kalokoh, Daniel Koroma, Africanus Sorie Sesay esq, Amadu Koroma, Ibrahim I. Mansaray, Ibrahim Sorie esq, Isata Kabia, Lansana Dumbuya, Lawyer Showers, Roland Nylander, Sulaiman Kabba Koroma, Warah Serry-Kamal and Sorie Tarawallie. The group had several more members and a draft was expected by the end of January 2019.

Dauda Kamara served as former ambassador of Sierra Leone to the United States and is known for his philanthropy.

== Sources ==
- List of members of parliament by district Sierra-Leone.org
