= Victor Chukuma Johnson =

Sierra Leonean entrepreneur and politician

Deputy Speaker of Parliament of Sierra Leone
- In office December 2007 – December 2012
- Preceded by: Santigie Sesay
- Succeeded by: Ajibola Manly-Spain

Deputy Leader and Chairman of the All People's Congress
- In office 2004–2012

Chairman of the Freetown City Council Committee of Management
- In office 1994–2000

Personal details
- Born: Victor Chukuma Johnson; 11 May 1944 Freetown, Sierra Leone
- Died: 15 July 2012 (aged 68) Makeni, Sierra Leone
- Party: All People's Congress (APC)
- Profession: Entrepreneur

Victor Chukuma Johnson (11 May 1944 – 15 July 2012) was a Sierra Leonean entrepreneur and politician who was the deputy leader and chairman of the All People's Congress between 2004 and 2012. He also held the position of deputy speaker of parliament of Sierra Leone in the erstwhile government of Ernest Bai Koroma. He had also served as chairman of the Freetown City Council Committee of Management.

== Biography ==
Born and raised in Waterloo in the capital Freetown to Creole parents Caleb Ethelbert Johnson and Marian Ekundayo Johnson, Johnson attended W.A.M Collegiate Secondary School before majoring in finance.

He was a member of the Sierra Leone Parliament from the Western Area Rural District, representing constituency 94, which is mainly made up of the neighbourhood of Waterloo in Freetown. Johnson was first elected a member of parliament in the 2002 Sierra Leone Parliamentary elections.

He was the recipient of the Commander of the Order of the Republic of Sierra Leone (CRSL), awarded in May 2012 by the President in recognition of his distinguished and dedicated service to the nation, in the areas of general commerce, public service and politics.
