= Unity Party (Sierra Leone) =

- Leader: Femi Claudius Cole
- Founder: Femi Claudius Cole
- Founded: 2017
- Headquarters: 4 Pademba Road, Freetown, Sierra Leone
- Ideology: African nationalism African socialism
- Political position: Centre-left to left-wing
- Colors: Light Blue
- Seats in Parliament: 0 / 132
- District Councils Chairperson: 0 / 13
- Municipalities Mayors: 0 / 6

Website
- Official Website

The Unity Party is a political party in Sierra Leone. It was founded on 25 October 2017 by Femi Claudius Cole.

It is the first political party founded by a woman in the history of Sierra Leone.

== History ==
The party has offices in Bo, Kenema, and Makeni.

In partnership with the West End Clinic, she established the Unity Movement Sierra Leone, a voter outreach initiative that used mobile medical outreach programmes to treat malaria, hypertension, diabetes, and other illnesses. The initiative included town meetings in marginalized communities.

== Ideology ==
The aim of the Unity Party is to bring Sierra Leoneans of all ethnic groups together in a common effort to improve the country. The party's main focus is education, health, job creation and increased international trade.

The aims of the Unity Party are:

1. A unified and multiethnic Sierra Leone.
2. A strategic outline for achieving growth and development.
3. Transparency, accountability, and integrity.
4. A smaller, focused, and more efficient government.
5. Commitment to minimize and as much as possible, to eliminate corruption.
6. Basic education, free and accessible to all.
7. A healthcare system designed to address the needs and challenges of life in Sierra Leone.
8. Investment and promotion of agriculture to achieve self-sufficiency in food production.

== Recent electoral history ==
The Unity Party participated in the 2018 General Election. So far the Unity Party does not hold any electoral seats.

=== In presidential elections ===
Cole began her presidential campaign before the party was officially registered in October 2017.

Cole stood as a candidate in the Sierra Leonean general election, 2018. She was the only female presidential candidate in the election and the first woman in history to run for the office of President of Sierra Leone.

Cole received the endorsements of Isata Jabbie Kabbah, the former First Lady of Sierra Leone and Dr.Nemata Majeks Walker, founder of the 50/50 Sierra Leone Group.

The Unity Party won 0.2% of the vote in the 2018 General Election.
