= John Karefa-Smart =

Sierra Leonean politician (1915–2010)

John Karefa Smart
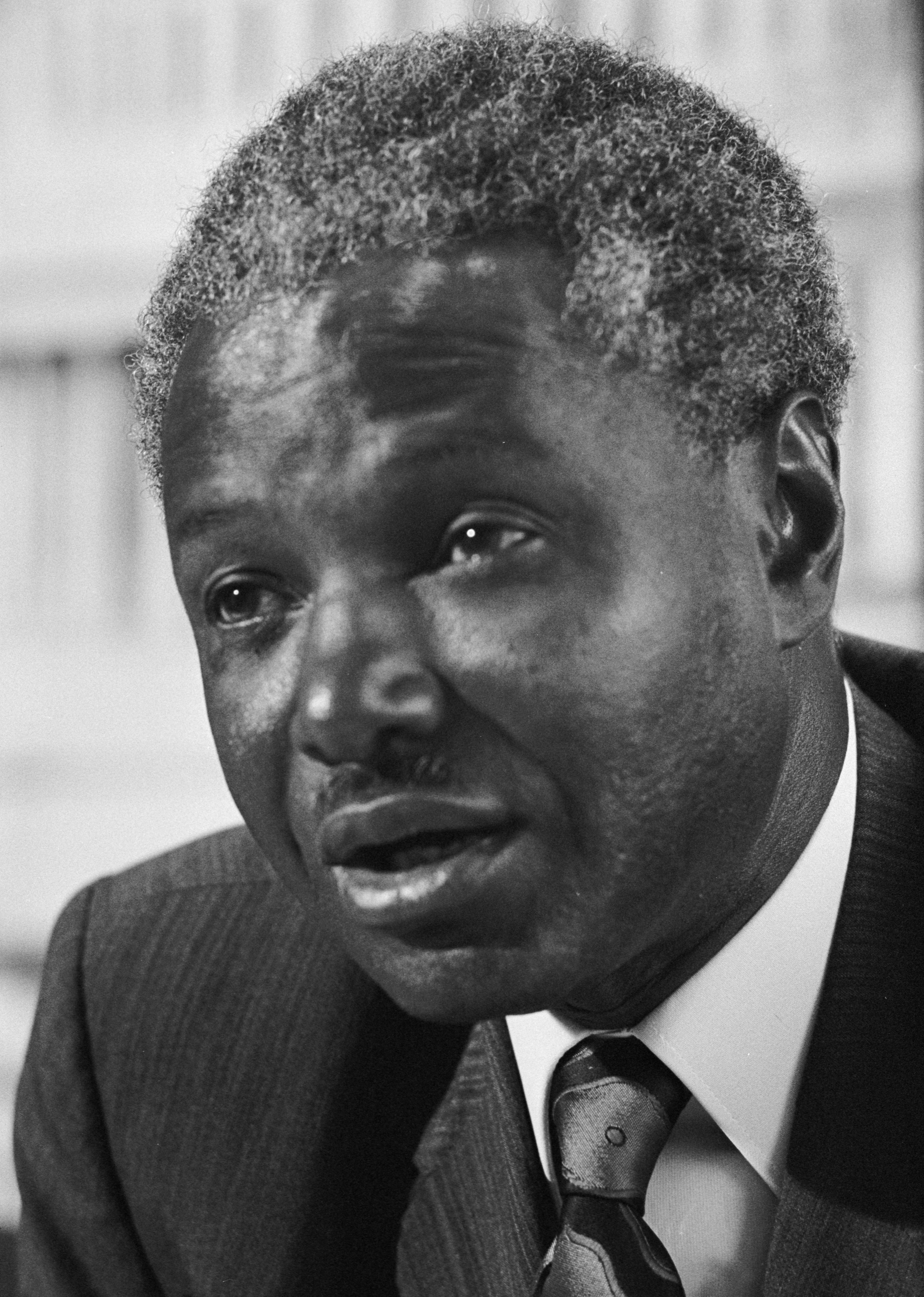
- Karefa-Smart in 1971

1st Minister of Foreign Affairs of Sierra Leone
- In office 27 April 1961 – 28 April 1964
- Monarch: Elizabeth II
- Preceded by: Position Created
- Succeeded by: Cyril B. Rogers-Wright

Leader of the United National People's Party (UNPP)
- In office 1996–2002
- Preceded by: Position created
- Succeeded by: Abdul Kady Karim

Personal details
- Born: John Albert Musselman Karefa-Smart; 17 May 1915 Rotifunk, Moyamba District, British Sierra Leone
- Died: 26 August 2010 (aged 95) Freetown, Sierra Leone
- Resting place: Rotifunk, Moyamba District, Sierra Leone
- Party: Sierra Leone People's Party (SLPP), United National People's Party (UNPP)
- Spouse: Rena Karefa-Smart
- Education: Fourah Bay College Freetown, Sierra Leone Otterbein College: Westerville, Ohio, US; McGill University: Montreal, Quebec, Canada; Harvard University: Boston, Massachusetts, US
- Profession: Medical Doctor

John Albert Musselman Karefa-Smart (17 June 1915 – 26 August 2010) was a Sierra Leonean politician, medical doctor and university professor. He served as the first Foreign Minister under Sierra Leone's first Prime Minister, Sir Milton Margai. He was an ordained Elder of the United Methodist Church.

A medical doctor by profession, Karefa-Smart was one of the founding fathers of the Sierra Leone People's Party (SLPP) in 1951. He was one of Sir Milton Margai's closest political advisors and a close personal friend. From 1957 to 1964, Karefa-Smart was a Member of Parliament of Sierra Leone from Tonkolili District.

After the death of Prime Minister Milton Margai in 1964, Karefa-Smart challenged Albert Margai for the SLPP leadership position, but he was unsuccessful, as Albert won the SLPP leadership and succeeded his brother as Sierra Leone's Prime Minister. Karefa-Smart ultimately left the SLPP and politics overall and moved abroad to continue his professional career.

From 1965 to 1970, Karefa-Smart served as Assistant Director-General to the World Health Organization (WHO). In 1970, he made an unsuccessful bid for the Presidency in Sierra Leone. From there, he returned to Geneva, then migrated to the USA to pursue his career in university teaching, research and public speaking.

In 1996, Karefa-Smart returned to Sierra Leone's politics as the founder of the newly formed United National People's Party (UNPP). He stood as the UNPP candidate in the 1996 presidential election, but he was defeated in the second round election runoff by the SLPP candidate Ahmad Tejan Kabbah.

== Education ==
An ethnic Sherbro, Karefa-Smart was educated by the Evangelical United Brethren primary School, in Moyamba District and the Albert Academy in Freetown. He received his BA from Fourah Bay College in Freetown in 1936. Four years later in 1940, he received his BS from Otterbein College in Westerville, Ohio, United States in 1940. From Otterbein, he went to McGill University in Montreal, where he received his MD and CM in 1944 and Diploma in Tropical Medicine in 1945. Finally, in 1948, he received his MPH from Harvard University in Boston.

== Academia ==
Karefa-Smart was also a fellow or professor at many colleges and universities across the world, including Bunumbu Union Teachers Training College in Sierra Leone (1936–38), University of Ibadan in Nigeria (1949–52), and several American universities such as Xavier University of Louisiana (1953), Columbia University (1964–65), Harvard University (1971–81), Boston University (1972–77), Wellesley College (1974), and Howard University (1980–83).

== Political career ==
Karefa-Smart's political career began with his election to Parliament in 1957. From 1957 to 1964, Karefa-Smart was a member of parliament for Tonkolili District. He also served as Minister of Lands, Mines, & Labor; Defense; and as Minister of Foreign Affairs (1961–1964). During that time period, he also served occasionally as acting Prime Minister. From 1965 until 1970, he was Assistant Director-General of the World Health Organization in Geneva, Switzerland. In 1996, he returned to Sierra Leonean politics as a member of parliament and presidential candidate. Karefa-Smart lost the 1996 and 2002 presidential elections to Ahmad Tejan Kabbah.

== Status as leader of the UNPP ==
It was initially reported on 12 June 2006 that Karefa-Smart had been replaced as leader of the UNPP at a party convention; however, Karefa-Smart subsequently refuted this claim and called the convention null and void.

== Death ==
Karefa-Smart was living in Connecticut when he was given a month to live and admitted to a hospice. In late July 2010, the Sierra Leonean government flew him back to Freetown, where he died on 26 August 2010.

Political offices
Preceded by none	Minister of Foreign Affairs of Sierra Leone; 1961–1964	Succeeded by Cyril B. Rogers Wright
