= Chernor Maju Bah =

Sierra Leonean politician (born 1972)

Chernor Ramadan Maju Bah

Deputy Speaker of Parliament of Sierra Leone
- In office December 8, 2012 – December 2017
- Preceded by: Victor Chukuma Johnson

Parliamentary Chairman of the Mines and Minerals Resources Committee
- In office 2010–2018

Chairman of the Parliamentary Legislative Committee
- In office 2010–2012
- Succeeded by: Ajibola Manly-Spaine

Personal details
- Born: Chernor Ramadan Maju Bah; 29 April 1972 (age 54) Freetown, Sierra Leone
- Party: All People's Congress (APC)
- Education: Fourah Bay College
- Profession: Lawyer

Chernor Ramadan Maju Bah (born April 29, 1972) also commonly known by his nickname Chericoco is Sierra Leonean lawyer and politician who is currently the leader of opposition since 2019 and previous held the position of Deputy speaker of parliament of Sierra Leone in the erstwhile government of Hon. Ernest Bai Korma and Parliamentary Chairman of the Mines and Minerals Resources Committee. He had also served as Chairman of the Parliamentary Legislative Committee.

== Biography ==
He is a member of the Sierra Leone Parliament from the Western Area Urban District, representing constituency 110, which is mainly made up of the neighborhood of Brookfields in Freetown. He is the ruling All People's Congress (APC) vice presidential candidate for the 2018 Sierra Leone presidential election, having named the APC vice presidential candidate at the party's convention in Makeni on October 15, 2017.

Chernor Maju Bah was first elected a member of parliament in the 2007 Sierra Leone Parliamentary elections. He was re-elected in the 2012 Sierra Leone Parliamentary elections with 68.45%, defeating his main opponent Joseph Maada Soyei of the main opposition Sierra Leone People's Party (SLPP).

Chernor Maju Bah was born and raised in the neighborhood of Brookfield in the capital Freetown. He is a practicing Muslim and a member of the Fula ethnic group from Freetown. He is a barrister-solicitor by profession.
