= 1986 Sierra Leonean parliamentary election =

Parliamentary elections were held in Sierra Leone on 29 and 30 May 1986. As the country was a one-party state at the time, the All People's Congress was the only party allowed to run. They were the last elections held under the 1978 constitution, as a 1991 referendum returned the country to multi-party politics.

== Background ==
The elections were held ahead of schedule following the early dissolution of parliament. This was reportedly done in order to "choose a Parliament that would reinforce the "new order" of economic reform and public probity advocated by the new President", Joseph Saidu Momoh.

Since the 1982 elections the parliament had been enlarged from 104 to 127 members, with an additional 20 elected MPs and a further three presidential appointees. The APC nominated 335 candidates to contest the elections, which had been due to be held on 15 and 16 May. There were around 2 million registered voters.

== Results ==
Party	Seats	+/–
All People's Congress	105	+20
Paramount chiefs	12	0
Presidential appointees	10	+3
Total	127	+23
Source: IPU
