= 1973 Sierra Leonean general election =

General elections were held in Sierra Leone on 15 May 1973. The result was a victory for the All People's Congress, which won 84 of the 85 elected seats. However, the main opposition, the Sierra Leone People's Party boycotted the election due to violence and alleged irregularities, and most APC candidates were elected unopposed.

== Results ==
Party	Seats	+/–
All People's Congress	84	+52
Independents	1	–5
Paramount chiefs	12	0
Total	97	+19
Source: African Elections Database
