= Femi Claudius Cole =

Sierra Leonean politician

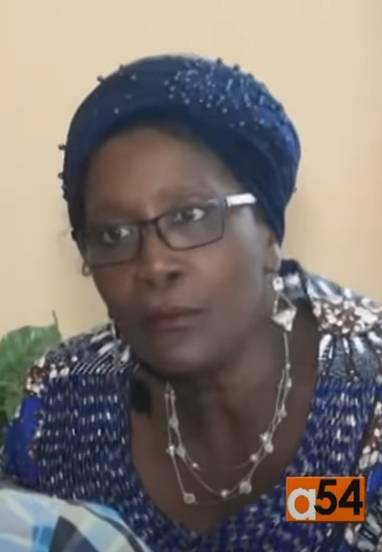
- Cole in 2018

Leader of the Unity Party
- Incumbent
- Assumed office November 2016

Personal details
- Born: Olufemi Claudius-Cole; 1962 (age 63–64)
- Party: Unity Party
- Parents: Dr. A.B. Claudius Cole (father); Rosalind Cole (mother)
- Profession: Politician
- Website: unitypartysl.com

Femi Claudius Cole (born 1962) is a Sierra Leonean politician. In 2016 she founded the Unity Party, making her the first Sierra Leonean woman to form a political party. In 2018, she was the first woman to run for the office of President of Sierra Leone. She is the only woman party leader in Sierra Leone.

== Early life ==
Olufemi Claudius-Cole was born in 1962 to Rosalind and Dr. A.B. Claudius Cole, a doctor. Her parents founded the West End Clinic in Freetown.

== Career ==
Cole was a nurse over twenty years. She worked as a nurse in Sierra Leone and abroad. She was chief matron of the West End Clinic in Freetown.

The gaps in available healthcare services between wealthy and poor Sierra Leoneans, the high maternal death rate and the high rate of deaths from preventable or treatable illnesses motivated her interest in politics. Cole considered joining a political party in 2013, but could not find one that she agreed with.

== Unity Party Sierra Leone ==
Claudius Cole founded the Unity Party in November 2016. She began her presidential campaign before the party was officially registered in October 2017.

The aim of the Unity Party is to bring Sierra Leoneans of all ethnic groups together in a common effort to improve the country. The party's main focus is education, health, job creation and increased international trade.

The party has offices in Bo, Kenema, and Makeni.

Cole stood as a candidate in the 2018 Sierra Leonean general election. She was the only female presidential candidate in the election and the first woman in history to run for the office of President of Sierra Leone.

In partnership with the West End Clinic, she established the Unity Movement Sierra Leone a voter outreach initiative through mobile medical outreach programs to treat malaria, hypertension, diabetes, and other illnesses. The initiative included town meetings in marginalized communities.

Cole received the endorsements of Isata Jabbie Kabbah, the former First Lady of Sierra Leone and Dr.Nemata Majeks Walker, founder of the 50/50 Sierra Leone Group.

The Unity Party won 0.2% of the vote in the 2018 General Election.
