= 1982 Sierra Leonean parliamentary election =

Parliamentary elections were held in Sierra Leone on 1 May 1982. They were the first elections since the country had become a one-party state under the 1978 constitution, with the All People's Congress being the sole legal party.

== Background ==
Following an amendment to the constitution in 1981, prior to the election, primaries were held to choose up to three candidates (all selected by the APC) to stand in each of the 85 constituencies. As a result, elections in 66 of the 85 constituencies were contested (13 of the 19 seats left uncontested were held by cabinet ministers).

The elections were marred by violence in which up to 50 people died. The APC used the army to crush opposition SLPP supporters in what became known as the "Ndogboyosoi [bush devil] war".

In addition to the 85 elected seats, the parliament consisted of 12 paramount chiefs elected through tribal councils and 7 MPs appointed by the president, Siaka Stevens.

== Results ==
Party	Seats	+/–
All People's Congress	85	+15
Paramount chiefs	12	0
Presidential appointees	7	+4
Total	104	+4
Source: IPU

== Aftermath ==
The results in 13 constituencies were cancelled due to "serious irregularities". By-elections took place on June 4.

40 sitting MPs and two ministers lost their seats, whilst a woman was elected to parliament in a constituency seat for the first time.
