= People's Movement for Democratic Change =

Political party in Sierra Leone

- Leader: Charles Margai
- Founder: Charles Margai
- Founded: January 19, 2006
- Headquarters: 44 Mahei Boima Rd; Bo
- Ideology: Liberalism
- Political position: Centre to centre-right
- Continental affiliation: Africa Liberal Network; Democrat Union of Africa (observer)
- Colors: Green, Orange
- Seats in Parliament: 0 / 149
- District Council Chairs: 0 / 14

The People's Movement for Democratic Change (PMDC) is a liberal party in Sierra Leone. It is a breakaway faction of the Sierra Leone People's Party (SLPP). It was officially registered on 19 January 2006. The party is led by Charles Margai, the son of Sierra Leone's second prime minister Sir Albert Margai and the nephew of Sir Milton Margai. The PMDC is based in the country's second largest city of Bo.

== 2007 Presidential Election ==
Margai, as the PMDC's candidate in August 2007 presidential election, received third place, behind Ernest Bai Koroma of the opposition All People's Congress (APC) and Solomon Berewa of the SLPP. On August 19, Margai stated his support for Koroma in the second round of the election. On August 20, the PMDC's Karamoh Kabba explained what he said was the reasoning behind the decision: the PMDC sought to "ensure a more representative government, the survival of the PMDC as a political party and the creation of a third formidable political force for smooth running of democracy in Sierra Leone". Furthermore, backing the APC would help to bridge the regional political divide marking Sierra Leone's politics (the SLPP and PMDC draw their main support from the south, while the APC draws its main support from the north), while backing the SLPP would deepen it. He added that the APC had a natural reason to want the PMDC to survive, while the SLPP had a natural reason to want to destroy it.

Margai's support for the APC provoked controversy in the PMDC, with some feeling that his decision was made without properly consulting the party. Margai said on August 24 that the PMDC would campaign together with the APC for the second round.

At the parliamentary election that was held on the same day as the first round of the 2007 presidential elections, the PMDC became the third largest party in Parliament with 10 seats (out of 112). In the 2008 Local Government elections, the PMDC did less well, winning only one Council Chairperson seat (out of 19), and 4% of the council seats. All seats won by the party were in the Southern region, specifically in the Bo, Bonthe, Moyamba and Pujehun districts.

In the 2012 elections the party lost all of its remaining seats.

== 2018 Presidential Election ==
Margai was a presidential candidate in Sierra Leone's 2018 General Election. He selected veteran educator Isata Dora Bangura to be his running mate.

The campaign struggled to gain traction as many Sierra Leonean's weren't willing to support Margai after he formed a political alliance with Ernest Bai Koroma and the All People's Congress in the 2012 General Election.

The PMDC won 0.4% of the vote and did not get any seats in parliament.

== Electoral history ==
=== Presidential elections ===
Election	Party candidate	Votes	%	Votes	%	Result
Election	Party candidate	First round		Second round		Result
2007	Charles Margai	255,499	13.89%	—		Lost ✗
2012	Charles Margai	28,944	1.29%	—		Lost ✗
2018	Charles Margai	9,864	0.39%	—		Lost ✗
2023	Charles Margai	16,012	0.57%	—		Lost ✗

=== Parliamentary elections ===
Election	Leader	Votes	%	Seats	+/–	Position	Government
2007	Charles Margai	275,435	15.39%	10 / 124	New	▲3rd	Opposition
2012	Charles Margai	69,202	3.23%	0 / 124	▼10	3rd	Extra-parliamentary
2018	Charles Margai	19,053	0.77%	0 / 146	0	▼7th	Extra-parliamentary
2023	Charles Margai	17,390	0.62%	0 / 149	0	▲4th	Extra-parliamentary
