= List of ambassadors of Sierra Leone to Germany =

Coordinates: 52.431476°N 13.314210°E

Ambassador of Sierra Leone to Germany
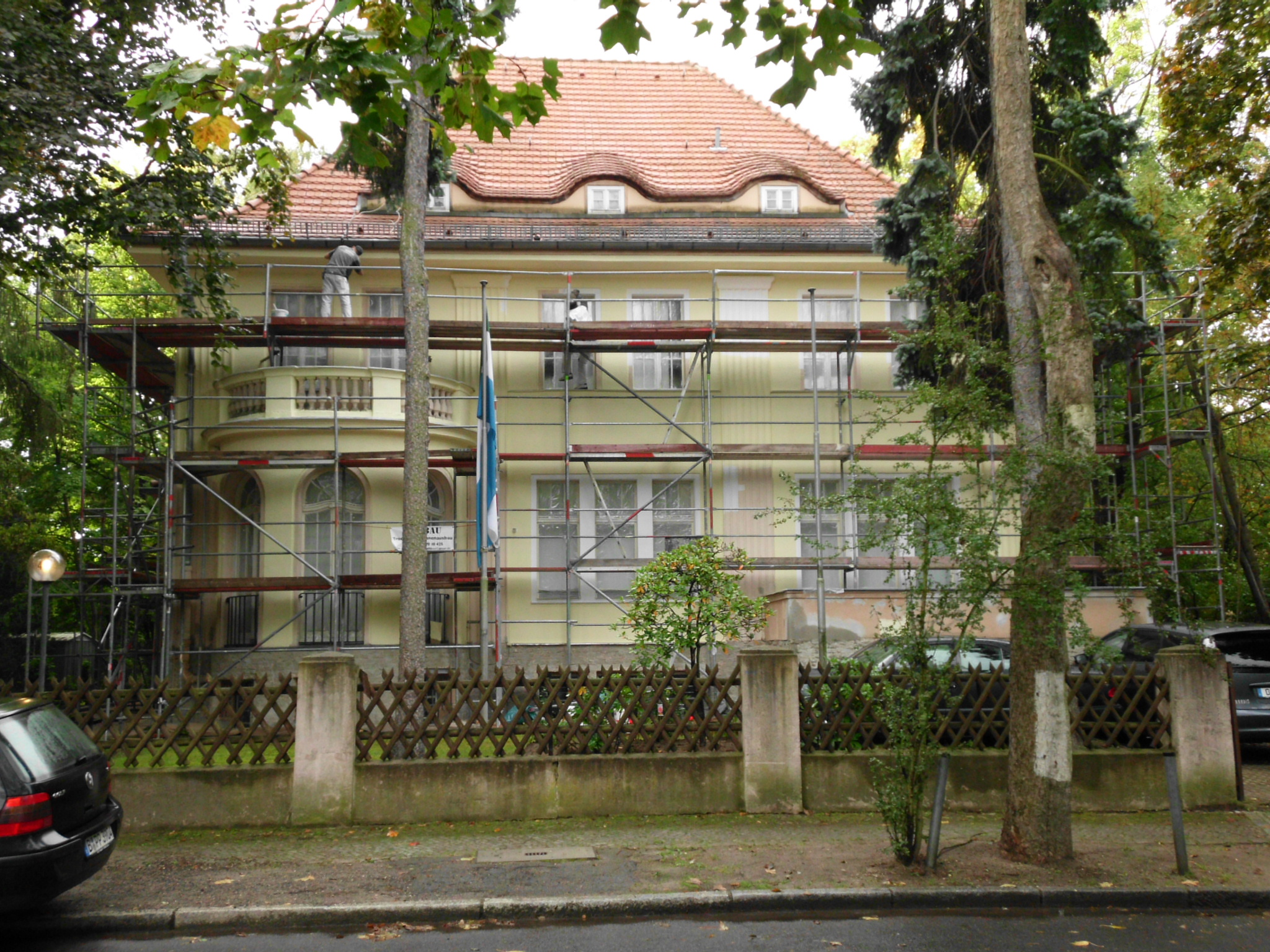
- Incumbent; Jongopie Siaka Stevens since April 28, 2009
- Inaugural holder: Desmond Luke
- Formation: September 25, 1969

The Sierra Leonean Ambassador to Germany is the official representative of the Government of Sierra Leone to the Government of Germany.

== List of representatives ==
Designated/accredited	Ambassador	Observations	List of heads of state of Sierra Leone	List of chancellors of Germany	Term end
September 25, 1969	Desmond Luke	In 1970, Desmond was appointed Sierra Leone's first ambassador to West Germany and combined this with an ambassadorship to France starting in 1971	Siaka Stevens	Willy Brandt	1973
1973	Sheka Hassan Kanu	(*born April 12, 1932, Petifu, Sierra)	Siaka Stevens	Helmut Schmidt	August 30, 1978
August 30, 1978	Gustav Harry Kashope		Siaka Stevens	Helmut Schmidt	
June 14, 1984	Sahr Thomas Matturi		Siaka Stevens	Helmut Kohl	1986
January 11, 1995	Colin Adeyemi Macauley		Valentine Strasser	Helmut Kohl	
September 24, 1996	Umaru Bundu Wurie		Ahmad Tejan Kabbah	Helmut Kohl	May 25, 2004
April 28, 2009	Jongopie Siaka Stevens	(*October 6, 1950)	Ernest Bai Koroma	Angela Merkel	
