= Milton Margai =

Sierra Leone head of government from 1954 to 1964

The Right Honourable Sir Milton Margai PC

1st Prime Minister of Sierra Leone
- In office 27 April 1961 – 28 April 1964
- Monarch: Elizabeth II
- Governors-General: Maurice Henry Dorman; Henry Josiah Lightfoot Boston
- Preceded by: position established
- Succeeded by: Sir Albert Margai

Chief Minister of Sierra Leone
- In office 9 July 1954 – 14 August 1958

Leader of the Sierra Leone People's Party (SLPP)
- In office 1951–1964
- Preceded by: Position created
- Succeeded by: Sir Albert Margai

Personal details
- Born: Milton Augustus Strieby Margai; 7 December 1895 Gbangbatoke, Moyamba District, British Sierra Leone
- Died: 28 April 1964 (aged 68) Freetown, Sierra Leone
- Resting place: At the Sierra Leone House of Parliament compound Tower Hill, Freetown, Sierra Leone
- Party: Sierra Leone People's Party (SLPP)
- Profession: Physician

Sir Milton Augustus Strieby Margai PC (7 December 1895 – 28 April 1964) was a Sierra Leonean physician and politician who served as the country's head of government from 1954 until his death in 1964. He was titled chief minister from 1954 to 1960, and then prime minister from 1961 onwards. Margai studied medicine in England, and upon returning to his homeland became a prominent public health campaigner. He entered politics as the founder and inaugural leader of the Sierra Leone People's Party. Margai oversaw Sierra Leone's transition to independence, which occurred in 1961. He died in office aged 68, and was succeeded as prime minister by his brother Albert. Margai enjoyed the support of Sierra Leoneans across classes, who respected his moderate style, friendly demeanor, and political savvy.

== Early life ==
Milton Augustus Strieby Margai was born on 7 December 1895 in the village of Gbangbatoke, Moyamba District, in the Southern Province of British Sierra Leone to Mende parents. He was the oldest of eighteen children. At the time of his birth, Sierra Leone was a British protectorate. His father was M.E.S. Margai, an affluent trader from Bonthe District. His grandfather was a Mende warrior chief. Margai received his primary education at the Evangelical United Brethren School in Bonthe, Bonthe District. He graduated from the Albert Academy in Freetown.

In 1921, Margai earned his bachelor's degree in history from Fourah Bay College. Margai went to medical school in England and graduated as a medical doctor from the Durham University College of Medicine (which went on to become Newcastle University Medical School) in 1926. Margai also attended the Liverpool School of Tropical Medicine. He became the first doctor from the protectorate.

Margai also played the piano, violin and organ.

== Medical career ==
Margai returned to Sierra Leone in 1928 after earning his medical degree and enjoyed an exceptional career in the Colonial Medical Service. He served in 11 of 12 districts in the protectorate. He waged informational campaigns on social welfare and hygiene.

=== Women's health reform ===
Margai trained health care workers to instruct female community leaders in the Mende women's religion, the Sande. The Sande religion served as a facilitation system of practical knowledge about midwifery passed down by generations of women in the region. In 1948, Margai wrote an article for African Affairs entitled "Welfare Work in a Secret Society", in which he discusses his successes in establishing a series of training camps which taught hygiene and domestic skills to young female Sande initiates. In the article, Margai states "It is simply natural that such a society, when correctly approached, will not be very much averse to the idea of infusing in its teachings a correct and more up-to-date information on the subjects it has been trying to teach, provided it does not interfere or expose the secrets of the society."

Working in concert with local women's groups, Margai helped introduce health and hygiene training into puberty initiation ceremonies. He also trained midwives and was the author of an instruction manual on midwifery in the Mende language. The women whom Margai trained became known as "Mamma Nurses", and were respected for their prowess in midwifery due to Margai's training.

== Political career ==
=== Early work ===
Margai's entry into politics occurred in the 1930s when he became a nonchief member of the Protectorate assembly representing the Bonthe region. By 1950, he was in charge of the Sierra Leone Organization Society. In 1951, Margai founded the nationalist Sierra Leone People's Party (SLPP) with Siaka Stevens, which won the 1951 election to the Legislative Council. After heading the departments of Health, Agriculture, and Forestry, Margai was elected chief minister in 1954. Although the SLPP won elections again in 1957, the following year Margai's leadership of the party was challenged by his younger brother, Albert, but even though he narrowly won the internal party election, he declined the leadership of the party, and left to form the opposition People's National Party, rejoining his brother in a coalition government in 1960.

=== Path to independence ===
Though Margai was pro-British and conservative in his political views, he felt that Sierra Leone would fare better as a self-determined state. In 1951, Margai oversaw the drafting of a new constitution which triggered the process of decolonisation. In 1953, Sierra Leone was granted local ministerial powers and Margai was made Chief Minister. The new constitution ensured Sierra Leone a parliamentary system within the Commonwealth of Nations and was formally adopted in 1958.

Margai led the Sierra Leonean delegation at the constitutional conferences that were held with British Colonial Secretary Iain Macleod in London in 1960. On 27 April 1961, Milton Margai led Sierra Leone to independence from the United Kingdom. The nation held its first general elections on 27 May 1962 and Margai was elected Sierra Leone's first Prime Minister by a landslide. His party, the Sierra Leone People's Party (SLPP) won a majority of seats in parliament. Margai then sought to heal divides between Sierra Leone's ethnic groups, as several northern ethnic groups felt underrepresented in the SLPP. To ameliorate their concerns, Margai appointed several elites from northern ethnic groups to key ministerial positions. However, this did little to lessen poverty in the north, and forced the SLPP to engage in clientelism in order to ease tensions with northern ethnic leaders.

=== Premiership ===
While Margai was only Prime Minister for three years, he served as a crucial first figurehead for Sierra Leone at the time of democratisation. In large part, Margai sought to unite the country and build a sense of national identity while becoming a member of the British Commonwealth. Margai was critical of colonialism as such, but also sought to give "credit where it was due", saying that if more colonial administrators "had been like Beresford-Stooke, Hodson, Wilkinson and Ransford Slater, colonialism would have had a better reputation. However, most simply were not." He also singled out the referendums held by Leslie Probyn as a point of praise. Margai sought good relations with the British government after independence. He said he felt "genuine respect" from Prime Minister Harold Macmillan and that "the respect was mutual." Margai gained the respect of the country's large illiterate population for his reputation as a skilled explainer. He also garnered support from local chiefs, who wielded significant social power at the time, because they respected the work he had done to achieve independence for the country. However, Margai faced criticism for suppressing the political activities of the All People's Congress (APC), Sierra Leone's opposition political party. Margai focused heavily on modernisation, particularly in the areas of education, health, and agriculture. Margai allowed local councils and governments to spearhead many improvement projects, but they were ultimately accountable to the central government, and Margai sometimes withheld funding from councils controlled by the opposition party.

When Margai became Prime Minister, he left control of the Sierra Leonean national army in the hands of the British. Slowly, Margai gave more control of the army over to Sierra Leoneans, and by 1964, the army was fairly ethnically heterogenous, with 26% of officers being Mende, 12% Temne, and 64% other groups. Once Margai died, however, his brother Sir Albert Margai took power and sought to make the army homogeneously Mende.

Margai struggled to handle issues of illegal immigration of the Fula people from Guinea. In 1962, his government rounded up several "strangers" under the assumption that they were illegal immigrants from Guinea, but released them upon learning they were local chiefs.

== Global policy ==
He was one of the signatories of the agreement to convene a convention for drafting a world constitution. As a result, for the first time in human history, a World Constituent Assembly convened to draft and adopt the Constitution for the Federation of Earth.

== Legacy ==
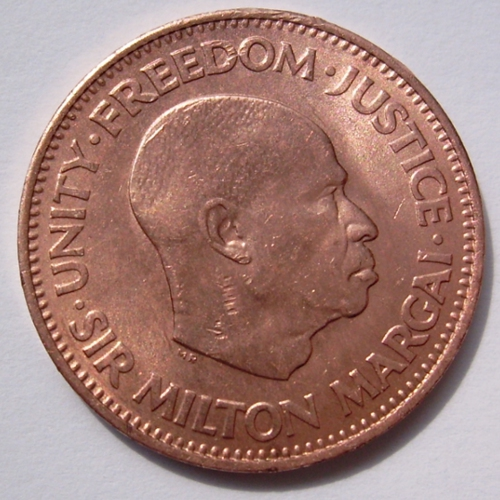
Sierra Leone 1964 Half Cent coin featuring Margai

=== Sir Milton Margai School for the Blind ===
In 1961, Margai appealed for funding to build a school for the blind in Freetown. In 1962, he set the foundation stone for the building at Wilkinson Road. The school motto is: "We cannot see but we will conquer". In 2006, the school was the subject of a three-part documentary on BBC News. The Milton Margai School for the Blind Choir has toured the UK twice in 2003 and 2006.

=== Milton Margai College of Education and Technology ===
In 1963, the Milton Margai College of Education and Technology was established. The first incarnation of the school was the Milton Margai Teacher's College but as the school grew and the curriculum expanded the name was changed to the Milton Margai College of Education. In 2000, the school merged with the Freetown Technical Institute.

== See also ==
- Sierra Leone People's Party
- Sir Albert Margai
- Charles Margai
- List of Durham University people

Preceded by none	Prime Minister of Sierra Leone; 1961–1964	Succeeded by Albert Margai
