= Young People's Party (Sierra Leone) =

Political party in Sierra Leone

The Young People's Party is a political party in Sierra Leone without parliamentary representation.
