= Charles Margai =

Sierra Leonean politician and lawyer (born 1945)

Charles Francis Margai
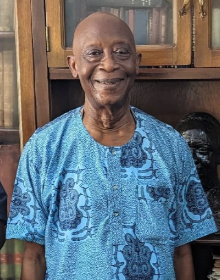
- Margai in 2023

Attorney General and Minister of Justice of Sierra Leone
- In office 16 April 2018 – 11 June 2018
- President: Julius Maada Bio
- Preceded by: Joseph Fitzgerald Kamara
- Succeeded by: Dr. Priscilla Schwartz

Sierra Leone Minister of Safety and Security
- In office 2 November 1999 – 2 February 2001

Sierra Leone Minister of Internal Affairs and Local Government
- In office 20 April 1998 – 2 November 1999

Personal details
- Born: Charles Francis Kondo Margai; 19 August 1945 (age 81) Bonthe, Bonthe District, British Sierra Leone
- Party: People's Movement for Democratic Change (PMDC)
- Spouse: Vivat Margai
- Relations: Sir Albert Margai (father); Sir Milton Margai (uncle)
- Education: Trinity College Dublin
- Profession: Constitutional lawyer

Charles Francis Kondo Margai (born 19 August 1945) is a Sierra Leonean politician and constitutional lawyer who served as Attorney General and Minister of Justice of Sierra Leone in 2018.

Margai is a former candidate for the office of President of Sierra Leone and the leader of the People's Movement for Democratic Change (PMDC). He was his party's candidate in the August 2007 presidential election, placing third with 10% of the vote. Though he received less than 3% of the votes in the 2012 and 2018 Sierra Leone presidential elections. Margai is the son of Albert Margai, former Prime Minister of Sierra Leone, and the nephew of Sierra Leone's first Prime Minister Milton Margai.

== Early life ==
Charles Francis Kondo Margai was born on 19 August 1945 in Bonthe, Bonthe District in southern British Sierra Leone. He is the natural son of Sir Albert Margai, second Prime Minister of Sierra Leone. His uncle, Sir Milton Margai, was Sierra Leone's first Prime Minister.

=== Education ===
Charles Margai attended St. Edward's Primary School in Freetown and then proceeded to the Christ the King College in Bo. He completed his secondary school education at Blackrock College in County Dublin, Ireland. Margai received a Bachelor of Arts in civil law in 1970 from Trinity College Dublin.

=== Family and personal life ===
Margai is married to Vivat Margai and has four children, a boy and three girls. The boy is called Albert Peter Margai, The girls are Gbatima Margai, Eluma Margai, and Ndanneh Margai.

=== Law career ===
Margai began working as a lawyer in 1971 as State Counsel in Freetown. He later opened his private law office in 1973 in Bo.

== Political career ==
=== Sierra Leone People's Party ===
Margai was a member of the Sierra Leone People's Party (SLPP), which was co-founded in 1951 by his uncle Milton Margai. Both his father and his uncle had been leaders of the SLPP. In 1996 Charles Margai sought the nomination to stand as the party's candidate in the 1996 presidential elections. When he failed to secure the nomination he left the SLPP.

=== National Unity Party ===
In the aftermath of Margai's failure to become the SLPP presidential candidate, he joined the National Unity Party and ran in the 1996 parliamentary election.

=== Return to the Sierra Leone People's Party ===
He subsequently returned to the SLPP and in April 1998, Margai became Minister of Internal Affairs and Local Government following the restoration of President Ahmed Tejan Kabbah; From November 1999 he was Minister of Safety and Security.

==== Infighting in the SLPP ====
On 6 January 2002, Kabbah requested that Margai clarify reports that the latter planned to seek the SLPP party leadership, which was held by Kabbah. Margai resigned as a minister on 8 January 2002 following a meeting with Kabbah, in which Kabbah expressed concern that the country might appear unstable and might therefore receive less aid from abroad.

On 9 January, Margai confirmed his plans to seek the leadership of the SLPP and its presidential nomination, describing himself as the best person for the position and saying that he had resigned from the cabinet "in the interest of good governance and for the people of this nation" due to "mistrust" between himself and Kabbah.

On 8 March, however, the High Court ruled that he was not technically a member of the SLPP, preventing him from seeking the nomination, which was won by Kabbah.

Margai was President of the Sierra Leone Bar Association from 2004 to 2005.

Margai again unsuccessfully sought the SLPP presidential nomination at the party's national convention in Makeni on 3–4 September 2005; he received second place, with 34 votes, far behind vice-president Solomon Berewa, who received 291 votes.

=== People's Movement for Democratic Change ===
In early October 2005, he broke with the SLPP to form a new party, the People's Movement for Democratic Change. Margai faced difficulty in getting the PMDC officially registered, which he alleged was due to Kabbah deliberately delaying appointments to the Political Parties Commission which would enable the registration, thereby giving Berewa's campaign an advantage in time.

The PMDC was officially registered on 19 January 2006.

==== Arrest ====
On 7 December 2005, Margai was arrested in connection with an incident on 18 November in which his supporters blocked a convoy that included Berewa, leading to accusations that Margai was behind it as an attempt to kill Berewa. Margai denied this, saying that his supporters had acted spontaneously.

=== 2007 election ===
In the August 2007 presidential election, Margai took third place with 13.9% of the vote, behind Ernest Bai Koroma of the opposition All People's Congress (APC) and the SLPP's Berewa.

At his birthday party on 19 August, he said that he was backing the APC's Koroma for the second round of the election. On 24 August, he said that the PMDC would campaign together with the APC for the second round The alliance he formed with the APC thwarted the SLPP's chances to win the 2007 election and thus Margai became the kingmaker of the Koroma presidency. However, the PMDC's constitution did not permit him to join a government led by the APC. However, after the election, he became a close ally and confidante to President Koroma.

As part of the PMDC and APC deal saw Koroma appoint 8 members of Margai's senior party chiefs and financial supporters to ministerial positions. All of Margai's PMDC ministers lost their positions by 2010 and were replaced by APC supporters.

He entered into a legal dispute with then-First Lady of Sierra Leone Sia Koroma over a property in Aberdeen. When Mrs. Koroma received a favorable judgment, Margai went to the national news media to demand the First Lady's arrest. He was arrested in May 2013, charged with "careless talk" and detained for several days before being set free on bail.

=== 2018 presidential election ===
Margai was the PMDC candidate for Sierra Leone's 2018 presidential election. He choose educator Isata Dora Bangura as his running mate, making her Sierra Leone's second woman vice presidential candidate .

The PMDC won 0.4% of the vote.

== Attorney General and Minister of Justice of Sierra Leone ==
Margai was appointed Attorney General and Minister of Justice of Sierra Leone by President Julius Maada Bio on 16 April 2018.

Shortly after he received his appointment, a memo from Margai to President Bio was leaked during the first week of June 2018 requesting permission to dismiss the Chief Justice of Sierra Leone, the Commissioner of the Anti-Corruption Commission and other officials. The memo also indicated that he wanted the president to form a commission of inquiry to investigate the finances of members of the former APC government. Political observers speculated that Margai wished to use the office to exact revenge on his political enemies in the APC.

On 12 June 2018, a week after the memo was leaked, President Bio dismissed Margai as Attorney General and Minister of Justice without any official reason. He was immediately replaced by Dr. Patricia Schwartz, who Margai had recently recommended to President Bio to head the law school at the University of Sierra Leone.

With a tenure of less than two months, Margai is the shortest ever serving Attorney General and Minister Justice in the history of Sierra Leone.
