= Sierra Leone People's Party =

Political party in Sierra Leone

- SLPP symbol, the palm-tree
- Abbreviation: SLPP
- Leader: Julius Maada Bio
- Chairperson: Mbatilo Songa
- Secretary-General: Paran Tarawalie
- Spokesperson: Lahai Laurence Leema
- Founder: Lamina Sankoh, Paramount Chief Julius Gulama, Milton Margai, among others
- Founded: 27 April 1951
- Merger of: Peoples Party (PP), Protectorate Education Progressive Union (PEPU), Sierra Leone Organisation Society (SOS)
- Headquarters: 15 Wallace Johnson Street, Freetown, Sierra Leone
- Ideology: Social democracy Civic nationalism Liberalism; Centrism; Third Way; 1951–2012: Conservatism
- Political position: Centre to centre-left 1951–2012: Centre-right
- Continental affiliation: Democrat Union of Africa
- Colors: Green
- Slogan: One People, One Country
- Seats in Parliament: 81 / 149 (54%)
- District Council Chairs: 6 / 16 (38%)
- Municipality Mayors: 3 / 7 (43%)

Website
- slpp.sl

The Sierra Leone People's Party (SLPP) is one of the two major political parties in Sierra Leone, along with its main political rival the All People's Congress (APC). It has been the ruling party in Sierra Leone since 4 April 2018. The SLPP dominated Sierra Leone's politics from its foundation in 1951 to 1967, when it lost the 1967 parliamentary election to the APC, led by Siaka Stevens. Originally a centre-right, conservative party, it identifies since 2012 as a centre-left social democratic party, with a centrist tendency.

The SLPP returned to power when its leader Ahmad Tejan Kabbah won the 1996 presidential election. The party was in power from 1996 to 2007, when it again lost to the APC, led by Ernest Bai Koroma, in the 2007 presidential election. SLPP returned to power on 4 April 2018 when Julius Maada Bio was sworn in as the new President of Sierra Leone after winning the 2018 Sierra Leone presidential election.

SLPP is overwhelmingly popular in Mende areas in south and eastern Sierra Leone (except in Kono District, a swing district), where the party regularly wins presidential, parliamentary and local elections by large margins. The SLPP has large minority support in the Western Area (including Freetown). The SLPP also has large minority support in Koinadugu District and Falaba District in the north of the country. The SLPP also has significant minority support in Kambia District in the north of the country.

== Early success and Independence ==
SLPP dominated politics in Sierra Leone in the years following World War II. In 1955 and 1956, riots occurred in Sierra Leone, originally sparked by the artisan union's strike over pay; further unrest followed strikes by transport workers. These events grew animosity between the SLPP and Krio parties, especially the Cyril Rogers-Wright led United Sierra Leone Progressive Party, established in 1954. The SLPP positioned itself as "the countryman's party", and garnered the support of tribal chiefs. In recent times however, the SLPP has been widely perceived as "the Mende man's party".

After elections in 1957, Milton Margai bowed to behind-the-scenes pressure and stepped down from SLPP leadership, replaced by his brother Albert Margai. However, in 1958, Albert Margai and Siaka Stevens launched a new party, the People's National Party (PNP), which aimed for greater African involvement in the British colonial government. With the independence of Ghana in 1957, the PNP sought the support of the educated elite to lead a transition to independence. Stevens would later leave the party to form the northern-supported All People's Congress. Upon independence in 1961, Milton Margai became prime minister, and the SLPP became the ruling party. The SLPP, along with almost all Sierra Leonean political parties, signed the constitution at the London constitutional conference; the APC was the notable exception. This unity did not extend to national politics, as opposing politicians often faced detainment under SLPP rule.

== Demise ==
Sir Milton Margai's death in 1964 left SLPP leadership to his brother Sir Albert Margai. Albert's rule was characterized by dissent. Politically, he attempted to strengthen the position of SLPP elites relative to the chiefs, who had formed the backbone of the party. Albert's autocratic leadership style was questioned within his party, sparked by actions such as the demotion of senior party members Alhaji M.S. Mustapha and Kerefa Smart. Albert also embarked on a policy of Africanisation, which removed some civil servants who favored a colonialistic approach. Margai may have adopted this strategy in an effort to replace the Creole civil administrators with unqualified members of his Mende tribe. Sir Albert Margai took power and sought to make the army homogeneously Mende. He also endeavoured to change Sierra Leone from a democracy to a one-party state.

Scores of schools were built in the provinces along with Teachers Colleges in every district (Makeni, Magburaka, Moyamba, and the Milton Margai Teachers College).

Opposing leaders criticized Margai's presentation of a bill to establish a one-party system in Sierra Leone and also blamed Margai for developments had led to an economic slowdown. In the 1967 elections, the APC and SLPP each won 32 seats in parliament, with 2 former SLPP Independents siding with the APC MPs Kutubu Kai-Samba and Luseni A. M Brewah. This development confirmed that the SLPP would no longer lead the country.

The subsequent political unrest led to the declaration of martial law and a military coup that took full control of the national government. The National Reformation Council (NRC), led by Brigadier Andrew Juxon-Smith, was established on 23 March 1967. Pressure from political elites, trade unions, and university students led to the junta's collapse in November 1970, and Siaka Stevens of the APC became president after the interregnum.

Under Stevens, Sierra Leone became a one-party state. In 1978 all SLPP MPs except one (Manna Kpaka, MP in Kenema) joined the APC. The SLPP was outlawed, and its elites and supporters were physically threatened and barred from holding meetings.

== Rebirth ==
In 1996 SLPP returned to prominence, as its candidate Ahmad Tejan Kabbah won the presidential election, receiving 59.5% of the popular vote in a second round against John Karefa-Smart of the United National People's Party (UNPP). In the election held on 14 May 2002, the party won 69.9% of the popular vote and 83 out of 112 seats in the House of Representatives, and its candidate in the presidential election, Kabbah, won 70.1% of the vote and was re-elected.

At the SLPP's national convention in Makeni on 3–4 September 2005, Vice-President Solomon Berewa was selected by the SLPP as its leader and 2007 presidential candidate. He received 291 votes, while Charles Margai received 34, Julius Maada Bio received 33, and J. B. Dauda received 28. In the August 2007 election, the SLPP was defeated by the APC in the parliamentary election, winning 43 seats against 59 for the APC; the PMDC, a splinter party founded by Charles Margai, attracted the support of some traditional SLPP voters, winning 10 seats. In the presidential election, the SLPP candidate, Berewa, took second place in the first round, winning 38.3% of the vote against 44.3% for the APC candidate, Ernest Bai Koroma. A second round of the presidential election was held in September; Koroma prevailed with 54.6% of the vote against 45.4% for Berewa.

The SLPP constitution requires its leader to resign if the party loses a national election; Berewa resigned as party leader on 17 October 2007, leaving Alhaji Sulaiman Jah as acting leader. In 2011, Julius Maada Bio became SLPP's nominee for the 2012 presidential election. He beat Usman Boie Kamara, who came in second place. Bio was nominated as the SLPP candidate for president in the 2018 election, which he ultimately won.

=== Julius Maada Bio presidency (2018–present) ===
In 2018, Sierra Leone held a general election. The presidential election, in which neither candidate reached the required threshold of 55%, went to a second round of voting, in which Julius Maada Bio was elected with 51% of the vote against the candidate of then-ruling All People's Congress (APC). On 4 April 2018, opposition candidate Julius Maada Bio of Sierra Leone People's Party (SLPP), was sworn in as Sierra Leone's new president.

== Electoral history ==
=== Presidential elections ===
Election	Party candidate	Votes	%	Votes	%	Result
Election	Party candidate	First round		Second round		Result
1996	Ahmad Tejan Kabbah	266,893	35.8%	608,419	59.5%	Elected ✓
2002	Ahmad Tejan Kabbah	1,373,146	70.1%	—N/a		Elected ✓
2007	Solomon Berewa	704,012	38.3%	789,651	45.4%	Lost ✗
2012	Julius Maada Bio	837,517	37.4%	—N/a		Lost ✗
2018	Julius Maada Bio	1,097,482	43.3%	1,319,406	51.8%	Elected ✓
2023	Julius Maada Bio	1,566,932	56.2%	—N/a		Elected ✓

=== Parliamentary elections ===
Election	Votes	%	Seats	+/–	Position	Government
1951	—N/a		2 / 7	New	▲2nd	Coalition
1957	75,575	46.13%	24 / 51	▲22	▲1st	Coalition
1962	230,118	34.67%	28 / 74	▲4	1st	Coalition
1967	230,999	37.10%	28 / 78	0	▼2nd	Opposition
1973	Boycotted		0 / 97	▼28	—N/a	Extra-parliamentary
1977	205,976	29.99%	15 / 100	▲15	2nd	Opposition
1982	Banned		0 / 104	▼15	—N/a	Extra-parliamentary
1986	Banned		0 / 127	0	—N/a	Extra-parliamentary
1996	269,888	36.17%	27 / 80	▲27	▲1st	Coalition
2002	1,293,401	67.67%	83 / 112	▲56	1st	Government
2007	707,608	39.54%	43 / 124	▼40	▼2nd	Opposition
2012	819,185	38.25%	42 / 124	▼1	2nd	Opposition
2018	964,659	38.93%	49 / 146	▲7	2nd	Coalition
2023	1,578,259	56.68%	81 / 149	▲32	▲1st	Government
