= People's Democratic Party (Sierra Leone) =

Political party in Sierra Leone

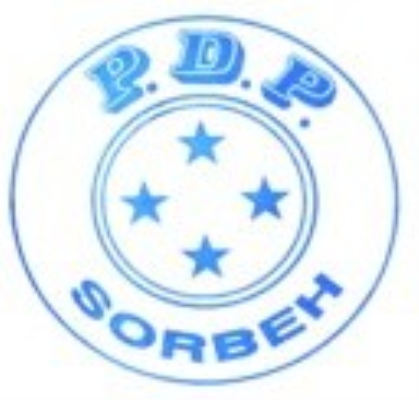
- Leader: Prince Coker
- Headquarters: 7 Tejan Lane, Freetown, Sierra Leone

The People's Democratic Party is a political party in Sierra Leone.

The party won 1.0% of the popular vote and no seats in the 2002 general election.
