= National Democratic Alliance (Sierra Leone) =

Political party in Sierra Leone

The National Democratic Alliance is a political party in Sierra Leone. In the August 2007 general election, the party did not win any seats in parliament, and its presidential candidate, Amadu Jalloh, won only 17,748 votes, 0.96% of the total.
