= United National People's Party =

Political party in Sierra Leone

The United National People's Party is a political party in Sierra Leone.

In 1996, the UNPP received 21.6% of the votes in the parliamentary election, winning 17 of the 68 seats. UNPP candidate John Karefa-Smart finished second to current president Ahmad Tejan Kabbah in both the first and second rounds of voting, receiving 22.62% and 40.5% respectively.

In the election held on 14 May 2002, the party won 1.3% of popular votes and no seats in parliament, while its candidate in the presidential election, Karefa-Smart, won 1.0% of the vote.

In the August 2007 general election, the party did not win any seats in parliament, and its presidential candidate, Abdul Kady Karim (whose running mate was Mohamed Sei), took seventh and last place with 7,260 votes, 0.39% of the total.
