= Peace and Liberation Party =

Political party in Sierra Leone

The Peace and Liberation Party is a political party in Sierra Leone. In the elections held on 14 May 2002, the party won 3.6% of popular votes and two out of 112 seats. Its candidate at the presidential elections, Johnny Paul Koroma, won 3.0% of the vote. It was formed by followers of Koroma, who ruled as military dictator from 1997 to 1998 after deposing the elected government of Ahmad Tejan Kabbah. During the Sierra Leone Civil War, Koroma's junta group was known as the Armed Forces Revolutionary Council.

Today, the party is led by Kandeh Baba Conteh. In the August 2007 general election, the party, with 0.38% of the vote, did not win any seats in parliament.

== Ideology ==
The party embraces social justice. In terms of economics they are for a mixed economy.

== See also ==
- Government of Sierra Leone
