= All People's Congress =

Political party in Sierra Leone

- Leader: Ernest Bai Koroma
- Chairman: Ernest Bai Koroma
- Secretary-General: Alhaji Osman Foday Yansaneh
- Spokesperson: Cornelius Deveaux
- Founder: Siaka Stevens
- Founded: 20 March 1960
- Split from: Sierra Leone People's Party
- Headquarters: 31 Railway Line, Brookfields Freetown, Sierra Leone
- Ideology: African nationalism Social democracy Pan-Africanism; 1971–1992: Pragmatic socialism
- Political position: Centre-left
- Colors: Red
- Slogan: Action, Progress, Commitment
- Seats in Parliament: 54 / 132 (41%)
- District Councils Chairperson: 7 / 13 (54%)
- Municipalities Mayors: 3 / 6 (50%)

Website
- apcsl.net

The All People's Congress (APC) is one of the two major political parties in Sierra Leone, the other being its main political rival the Sierra Leone People's Party (SLPP). The APC has been the main opposition party in Sierra Leone since 4 April 2018 when Julius Maada Bio of the SLPP won the 2018 presidential elections, though it maintains a majority in parliament.

The APC party was founded in 1969 by a breakaway group from the Sierra Leone People's Party that vehemently opposed elections before independence and instead supported independence before elections. The APC governed the country from 1966 to 1992 and became the ruling party again in 2007 after the party presidential candidate Ernest Bai Koroma won the 2007 presidential election, he contested and also won the 2012 elections. The APC lost power on 4 April 2018, with its flagbearer Samura Kamara losing the presidential election to Bio.

The APC is very popular and receives large majority support in almost all of the northern districts of Sierra Leone with strong ties to the Temne and some Limba people. The APC is also popular with significant majority in the Western Area (including Freetown).

== Overview ==
Following a heavily manipulated plebiscite in 1978, the APC became the sole legal party in the country, a status it retained until 1991. Presidents Siaka Stevens and Joseph Saidu Momoh were members of the APC. Momoh was overthrown in a military coup in 1992, and during the civil war that followed, the party was severely weakened.

In the parliamentary election held on 14 May 2002, the party won 19.8% of the popular vote and 22 out of 112 seats. Its candidate in the presidential elections, Ernest Bai Koroma, won 22.3% of the vote; he was defeated by Ahmad Tejan Kabbah of the Sierra Leone People's Party (SLPP).

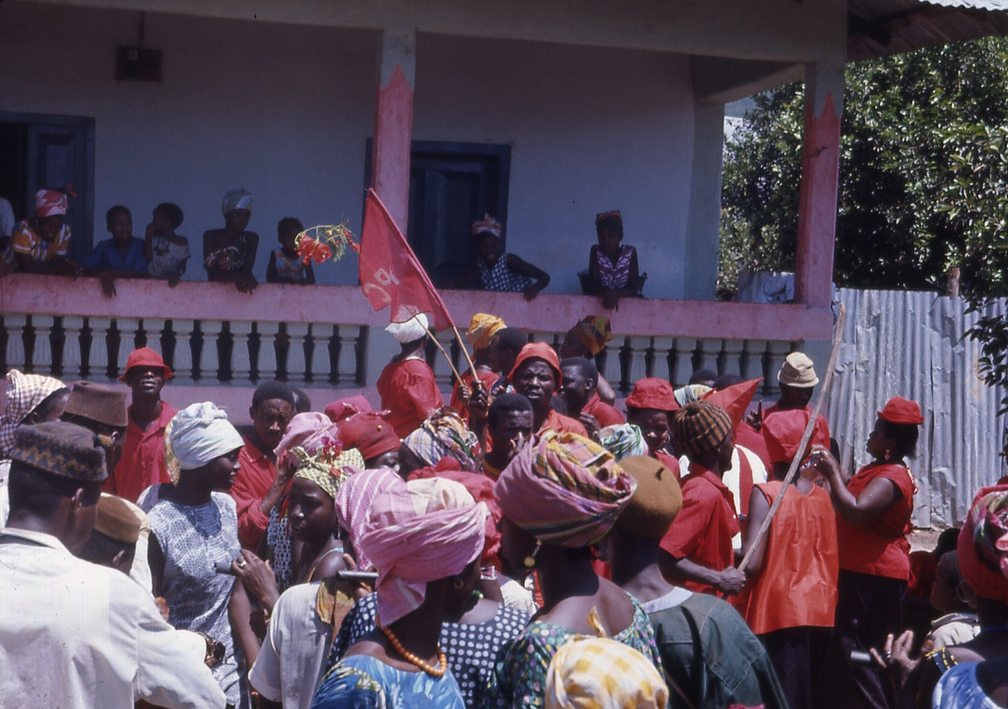
An All People's Congress rally in Kabala in 1968

For several years Koroma's leadership was challenged by some in the party, who took the issue to court; the dispute was said to be resolved in April 2007, with Koroma accepted by party dissidents as the party's leader ahead of the 2007 election. He was the party's candidate for president in the election, with the first round held in August 2007. In the first round he took first place with 44.3% of the vote, ahead of Solomon Berewa of the ruling Sierra Leone People's Party (SLPP) with 38.3%, but Koroma did not receive enough votes to win outright, and a second round was necessary. In the parliamentary election, held concurrently with the presidential first round, the APC won 59 out of 112 seats and became the largest party in Parliament.

Koroma was victorious in the second round of the 2007 presidential election, held on 8 September, winning 54.6% of the vote against 45.4% for Berewa. He was sworn in as President on 17 September.

APC has traditionally been based among the Temne and Limba people in the north.

In 2018 the party named a team whowould review the country's constitution. Although the plan was to not have new elections for five years the party wanted to suggest a new constitution. The members chosen included Elvis Kargbo, Dauda S. Kamara, Eddie Turay and Osman Foday Yansaneh, Abu Bakarr Kalokoh, Daniel Koroma, Africanus Sorie Sesay esq, Amadu Koroma, Ibrahim I. Mansaray, Ibrahim Sorie esq, Isata Kabia, Lansana Dumbuya, Lawyer Showers, Roland Nylander, Sulaiman Kabba Koroma, Warah Serry-Kamal and Sorie Tarawallie. The group had several more members and a draft was expected by the end of January 2019.

== Electoral history ==
=== Presidential elections ===
Election	Party candidate	Votes	%	Votes	%	Result
Election	Party candidate	First round		Second round		Result
1985	Joseph Saidu Momoh	2,780,495	99.9%	—N/a		Elected ✓
1996	Edward Turay	38,316	5.1%	—N/a		Lost ✗
2002	Ernest Bai Koroma	426,405	22.4%	—N/a		Lost ✗
2007	Ernest Bai Koroma	815,523	44.3%	950,407	54.6%	Elected ✓
2012	Ernest Bai Koroma	1,314,881	58.7%	—N/a		Elected ✓
2018	Samura Kamara	1,082,748	42.7%	1,227,171	48.2%	Lost ✗
2023	Samura Kamara	1,148,262	41.2%	—N/a		Lost ✗

=== Parliamentary elections ===
Election	Votes	%	Seats	+/–	Position	Government
1962	114,333	17.23%	16 / 74	New	▲2nd	Opposition
1967	279,715	44.92%	32 / 78	▲16	▲1st	Coalition
1973	—N/a		84 / 97	▲52	1st	Supermajority
1977	425,358	61.93%	70 / 100	▼14	1st	Supermajority
1982	—N/a		85 / 104	▲15	1st	Sole legal party
1986	—N/a		105 / 127	▲20	1st	Sole legal party
1996	42,467	5.69%	5 / 80	▼100	▼4th	Opposition
2002	409,313	21.41%	27 / 112	▲22	▲2nd	Opposition
2007	728,898	40.73%	59 / 124	▲32	▲1st	Coalition
2012	1,149,234	53.67%	67 / 124	▲8	1st	Government
2018	989,431	39.93%	68 / 146	▲1	1st	Opposition
2023	1,113,882	40.00%	54 / 149	▼14	▼2nd	Opposition
