= List of ambassadors of Sierra Leone to the United States =

Coordinates: 38.912829°N 77.043189°W

Ambassador of Sierra Leone to United States Embassy of Sierra Leone in Washington, D.C.
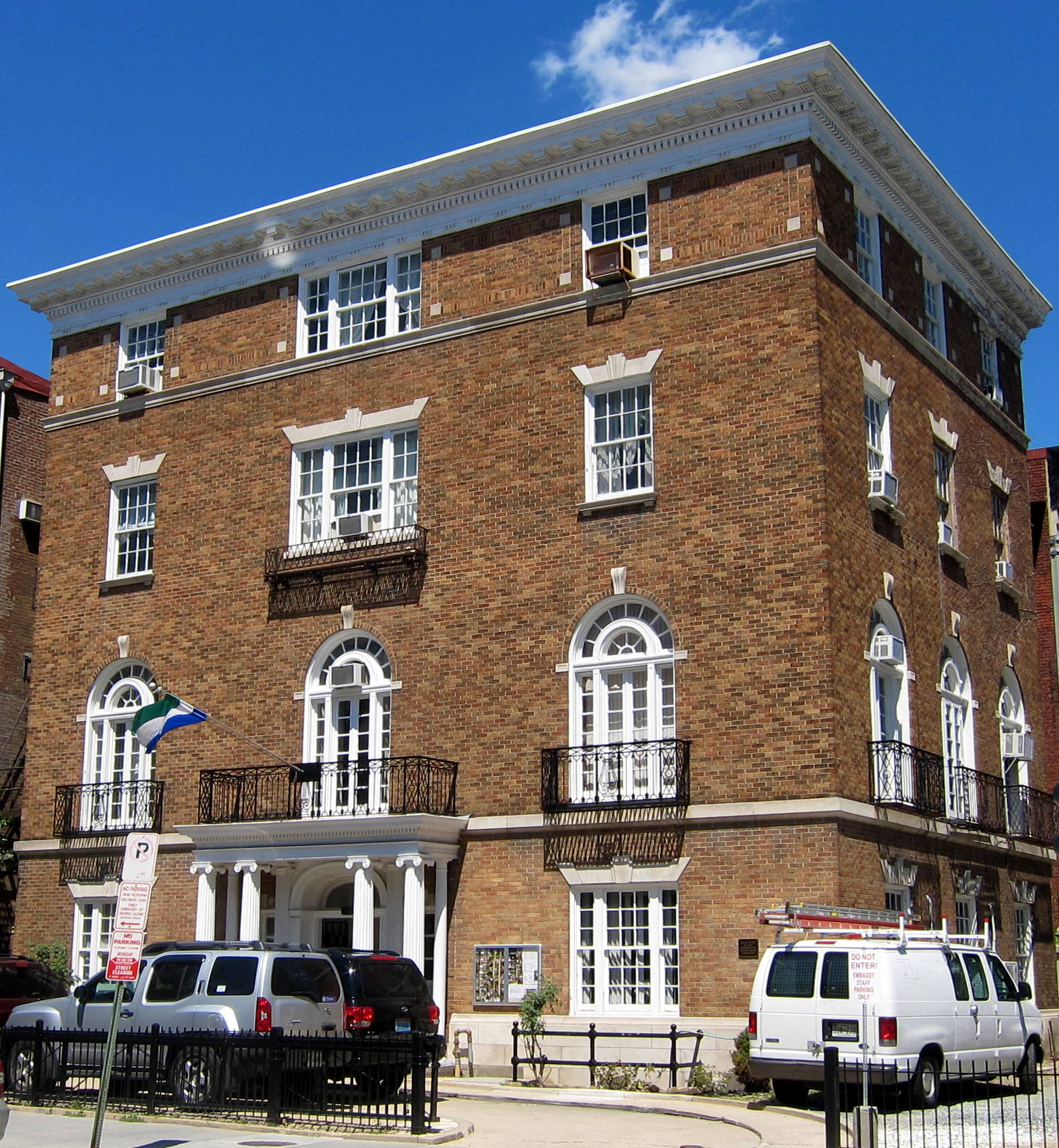
- Inaugural holder: William Henry Fitzjohn
- Formation: April 27, 1961

The Sierra Leonean Ambassador in Washington, D.C. is the official representative of the Government of in Freetown to the Government of the United States.

== List of representatives ==
Diplomatic agreement/designated	Diplomatic accreditation	Ambassador	Observations	President of Sierra Leone	List of presidents of the United States	Term end
April 27, 1961			EMBASSY OPENED	Maurice Henry Dorman	John F. Kennedy	
April 27, 1961		William Henry Fitzjohn	Chargé d'affaires	Maurice Henry Dorman	John F. Kennedy	
June 26, 1961	July 18, 1961	Richard Edmund Kelfa-Caulker		Henry Josiah Lightfoot Boston	John F. Kennedy	
October 16, 1963	November 20, 1963	Gershon Collier		Henry Josiah Lightfoot Boston	Lyndon B. Johnson	
February 16, 1967	February 17, 1967	Christopher Okoro Cole		Andrew Juxon-Smith	Lyndon B. Johnson	
January 18, 1968	January 19, 1968	Adesanya Kwamina Hyde		Andrew Juxon-Smith	Lyndon B. Johnson	
August 22, 1969	October 2, 1969	John Akar		John Amadu Bangura	Richard Nixon	
April 22, 1971		Collins O. Bright	Chargé d'affaires	Siaka Stevens	Richard Nixon	
July 21, 1971	July 22, 1971	Jacob Arthur Christian Davies	(* May 24, 1925) He is the son of Christiana Davies and Jacob S.: Education: Tropical Agriculture at University of Reading, Selwyn College, University of Cambridge, Imperial College,.; Career: 1967-1969 Perm. Secretary; Co-Director of a project of the United Nations Program, FAO.; And later appointed Chairman of the Public Service Commission.: 1972-1974: High Commissioner in the United Kingdom and the Ambassador not resident in Denmark, Sweden and Norway.; 1975-1976: Deputy Director of United Nations Operations for Agriculture FAO Division, Rome.; 1976-1982: Director of the Personnel Division.; 1982: Assistant Director-General, Regional Representative for Africa.	Siaka Stevens	Richard Nixon	
September 26, 1972	October 2, 1972	Philip Jonathan Gbagu Palmer		Siaka Stevens	Richard Nixon	
June 18, 1978		Olu William Harding	Chargé d'affaires: He was ambassador to Moscow, Rev. Harding is an ordained elder and member of the Wyoming Conference of the United Methodist Church.	Siaka Stevens	Jimmy Carter	
July 26, 1978	August 2, 1978	Mohamed Morlai Turay		Siaka Stevens	Jimmy Carter	
February 28, 1981		Ahmed Seray-Wurie	Chargé d'affaires	Siaka Stevens	Ronald Reagan	
December 21, 1981	January 13, 1982	Dauda Kamara		Siaka Stevens	Ronald Reagan	
February 20, 1987	May 11, 1987	Sahr Thomas Matturi		Joseph Saidu Momoh	Ronald Reagan	
October 25, 1988	November 9, 1988	George Munda Carew		Joseph Saidu Momoh	Ronald Reagan	
March 25, 1993	June 23, 1993	Thomas Kahota Kargbo	(* June 15, 1937 in Kamassassa Freetown) Education: Doctor of Medicine, University of Leeds, England. Royal College of Obstetricians and Surgeons, England. Johns Hopkins University, West Africa, University Surgeons.: From 1975-1985 practiced in obstetrics, Sierra Leone.; In 1987 Medical Government of Sierra Leone.; 1990-1991: Review Committee,. Proposed member of Parliament. 1991-1993: minister of commerce, industry and state enterprises	Valentine Strasser	Bill Clinton	
September 19, 1996	October 9, 1996	John Ernest Leigh		Ahmad Tejan Kabbah	Bill Clinton	
March 17, 2003	May 8, 2003	Ibrahim M'baba Kamara	former Sierra Leone's Ambassador to Ethiopia and currently United Nations Mission in Darfur (UNAMID) consultant, Ibrahim M'baba Kamara	Ahmad Tejan Kabbah	George W. Bush	
November 13, 2006	December 8, 2006	Sulaiman Tejan-Jalloh		Ahmad Tejan Kabbah	George W. Bush	May 25, 1997
March 28, 2008	April 9, 2008	Bockarie Stevens		Ernest Bai Koroma	George W. Bush	April 4, 2018
November 2024	July 2025	Amara Sheikh Mohammed Sowa		Julius Maada Bio	Donald Trump	

== See also ==
- Sierra Leone–United States relations
