= List of diplomatic missions of Sierra Leone =

This is a list of diplomatic missions of Sierra Leone, excluding honorary consulates.

As a member of the Commonwealth of Nations, Sierra Leonean diplomatic missions in the capitals of other Commonwealth member-states are known as High Commissions.

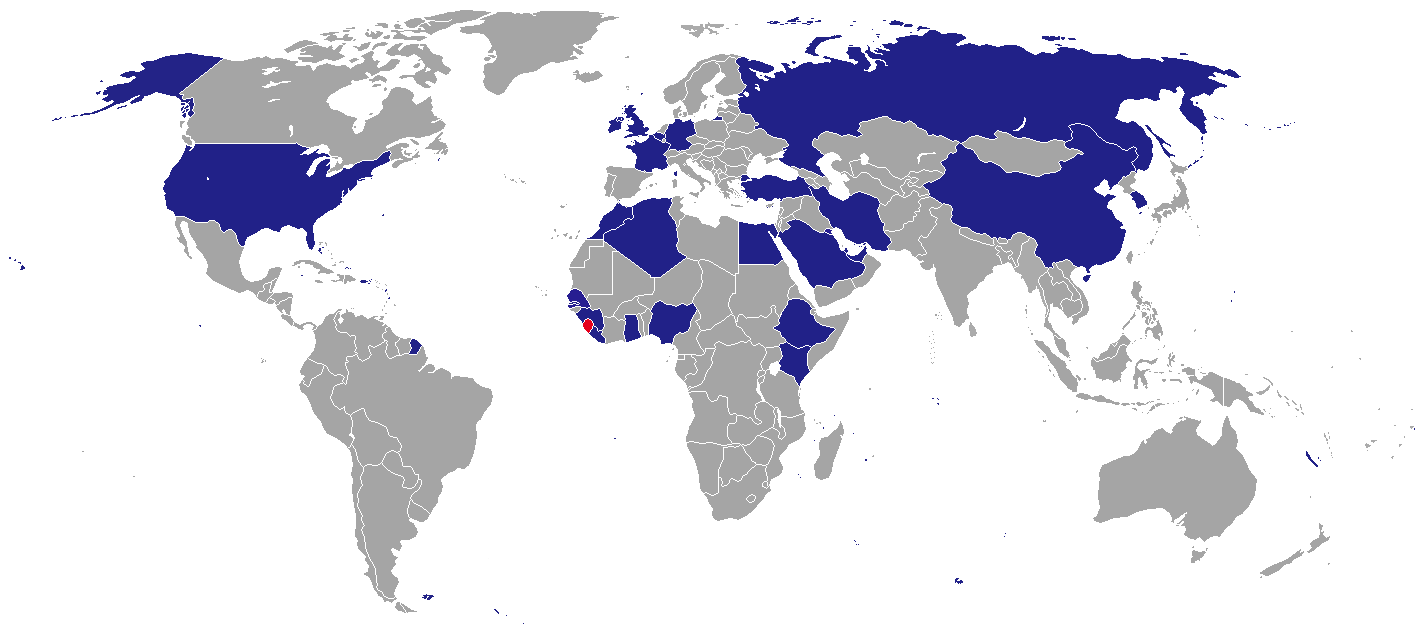
Location of diplomatic missions of Sierra Leone

== Current missions ==
=== Africa ===
Host country	Host city	Mission	Concurrent accreditation	Ref.
Algeria	Algiers	Embassy		
Egypt	Cairo	Embassy	Countries: Chad; Libya; Sudan; Tunisia; Multilateral Organizations: Community of Sahel–Saharan States	
Ethiopia	Addis Ababa	Embassy	Countries: Botswana; Mozambique; South Africa; Multilateral Organizations: African Union	
Gambia	Banjul	High Commission		
Ghana	Accra	High Commission	Countries: Burkina Faso; Togo	
Guinea	Conakry	Embassy	Countries: Mali	
Kenya	Nairobi	High Commission	Countries: Angola; Burundi; Malawi; Rwanda; Somalia; South Sudan; Tanzania; Uganda; Multilateral Organizations: United Nations; United Nations Environment Programme; United Nations Human Settlements Programme	
Liberia	Monrovia	Embassy	Countries: Ivory Coast	
Morocco	Rabat	Embassy		
Morocco	Dakhla	Consulate-General		
Nigeria	Abuja	High Commission	Countries: Benin; Cameroon; Congo-Brazzaville; Congo-Kinshasa; Equatorial Guinea; Niger; Multilateral Organizations: Economic Community of West African States	
Senegal	Dakar	Embassy	Countries: Cape Verde; Mauritania	

=== Americas ===
Host country	Host city	Mission	Concurrent accreditation	Ref.
United States	Washington, D.C.	Embassy	Countries: Bahamas; Bolivia; Brazil; Chile; Guyana; Jamaica; Trinidad and Tobago	
United States	Miami	Consulate-General	Countries: Bahamas; Bolivia; Brazil; Chile; Guyana; Jamaica; Trinidad and Tobago	

=== Asia ===
Host country	Host city	Mission	Concurrent accreditation	Ref.
China	Beijing	Embassy	Countries: Australia; Japan; New Zealand; North Korea; Singapore; Sri Lanka; Thailand; Vietnam	
Iran	Tehran	Embassy	Countries: Armenia; Azerbaijan; Iraq; Lebanon; Pakistan; Turkmenistan	
Kuwait	Kuwait City	Embassy	Countries: Bahrain; Jordan	
Qatar	Doha	Embassy		
Saudi Arabia	Riyadh	Embassy	Countries: Oman; Syria	
South Korea	Seoul	Embassy	Countries: Brunei; Indonesia; Malaysia; Philippines	
Turkey	Ankara	Embassy		
United Arab Emirates	Abu Dhabi	Embassy	Countries: Bangladesh; India	

=== Europe ===
Host country	Host city	Mission	Concurrent accreditation	Ref.
Belgium	Brussels	Embassy	Countries: Greece; Holy See; Luxembourg; Netherlands; Multilateral Organizations: European Union; Organisation for the Prohibition of Chemical Weapons; UNESCO	
France	Paris	Embassy		
Germany	Berlin	Embassy	Countries: Austria; Italy; Multilateral Organizations: Food and Agriculture Organization; International Atomic Energy Agency; International Fund for Agricultural Development; UNIDO; UNODC; World Food Programme	
Ireland	Dublin	Embassy		
Russia	Moscow	Embassy	Countries: Albania; Belarus; Bulgaria; Czechia; Estonia; Georgia; Kazakhstan; Kyrgyzstan; Latvia; Lithuania; Moldova; Romania; Serbia; Slovakia; Tajikistan; Turkmenistan; Ukraine; Uzbekistan	
United Kingdom	London	High Commission	Countries: Cyprus; Denmark; Finland; Israel; Malta; Norway; Portugal; Spain; Sweden	

=== Multilateral organizations ===
Organization	Host city	Host country	Mission	Concurrent accreditation	Ref.
United Nations	New York City	United States	Permanent Mission	Countries: Argentina; Cuba; Mexico; Uruguay; Venezuela	
United Nations	Geneva	Switzerland	Permanent Mission	Countries: Switzerland; Multilateral Organizations: International Labour Organization; World Health Organization; World Trade Organization	

== Gallery ==
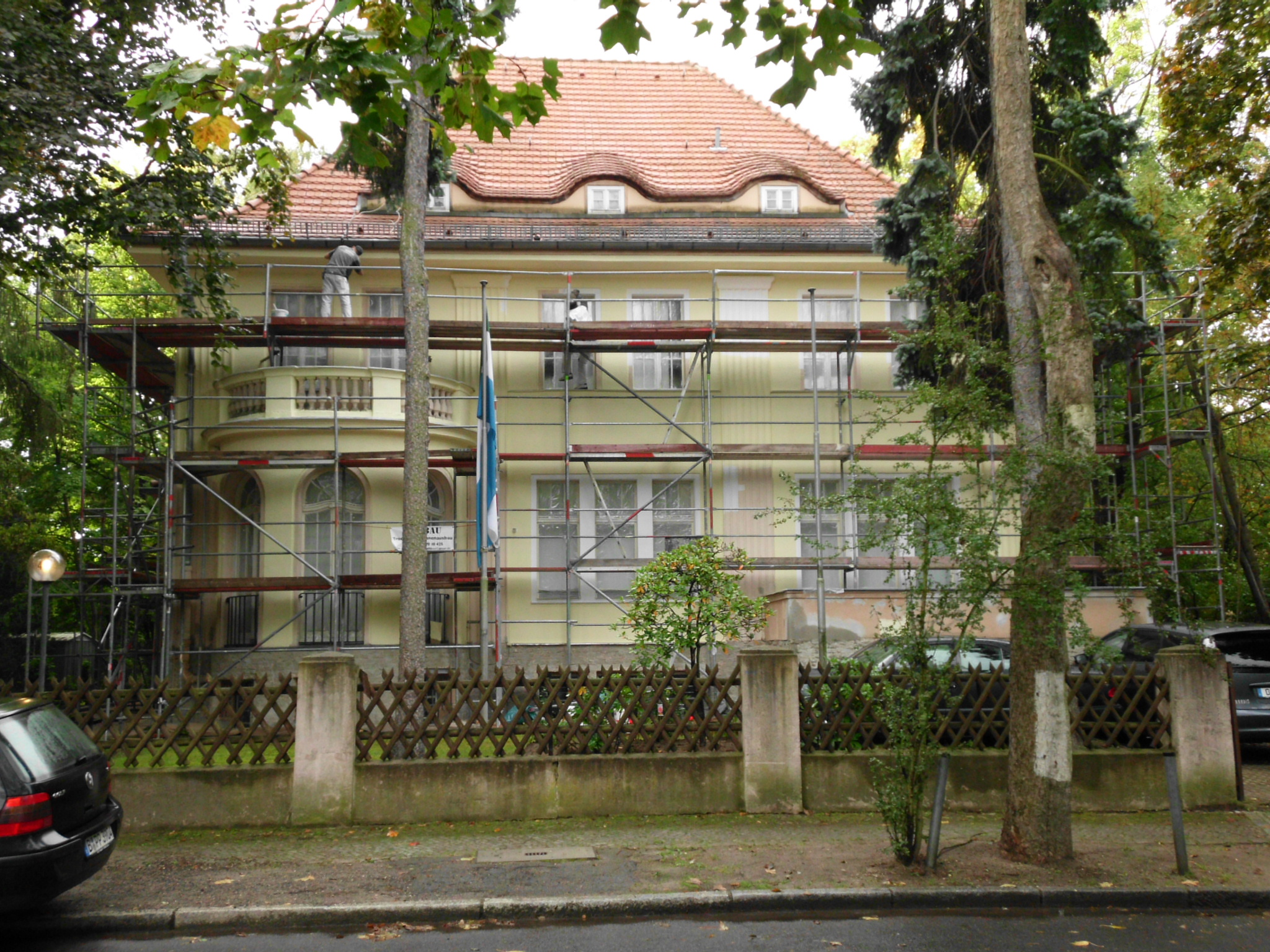
Embassy in Berlin

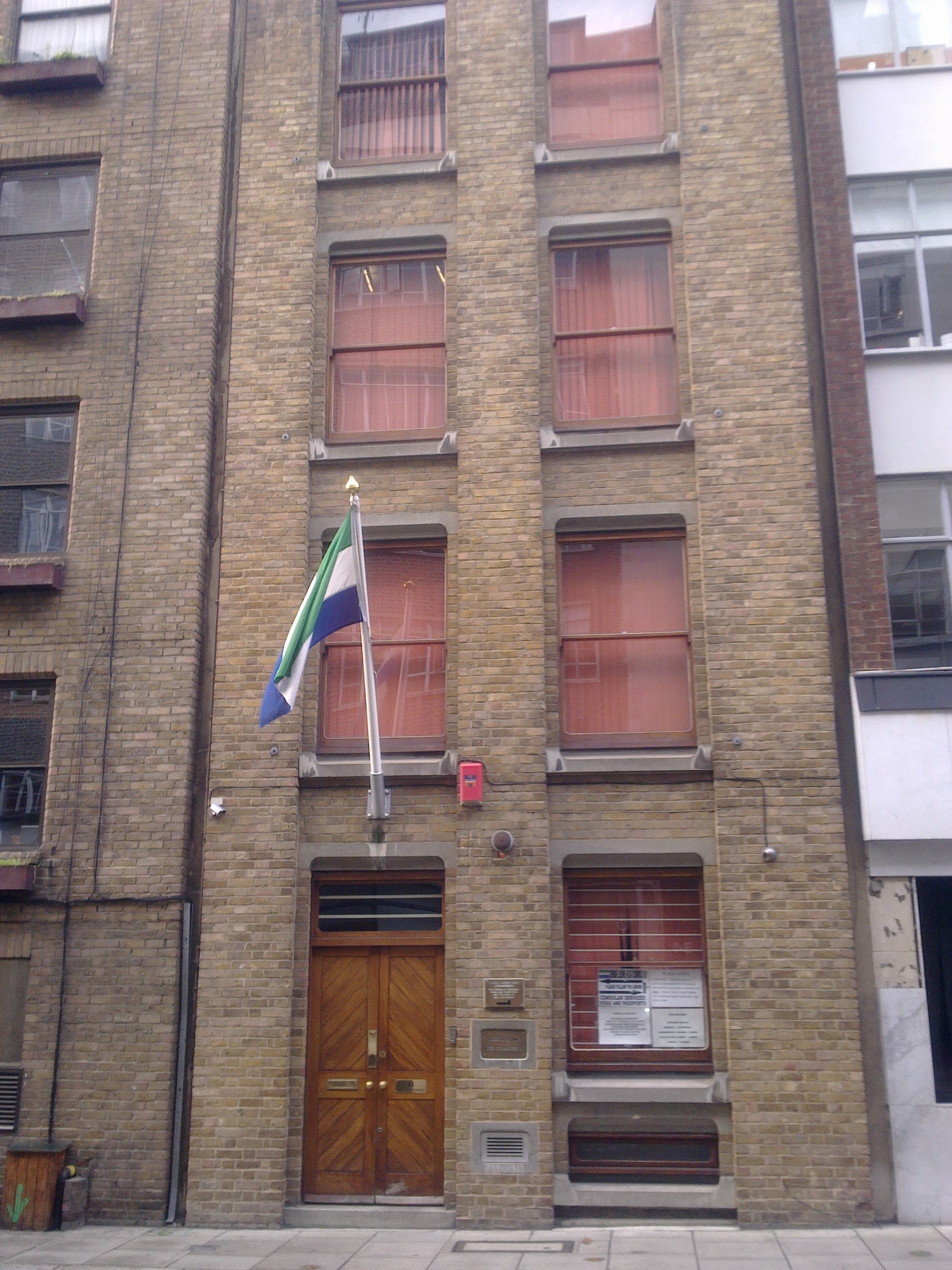
High Commission in London

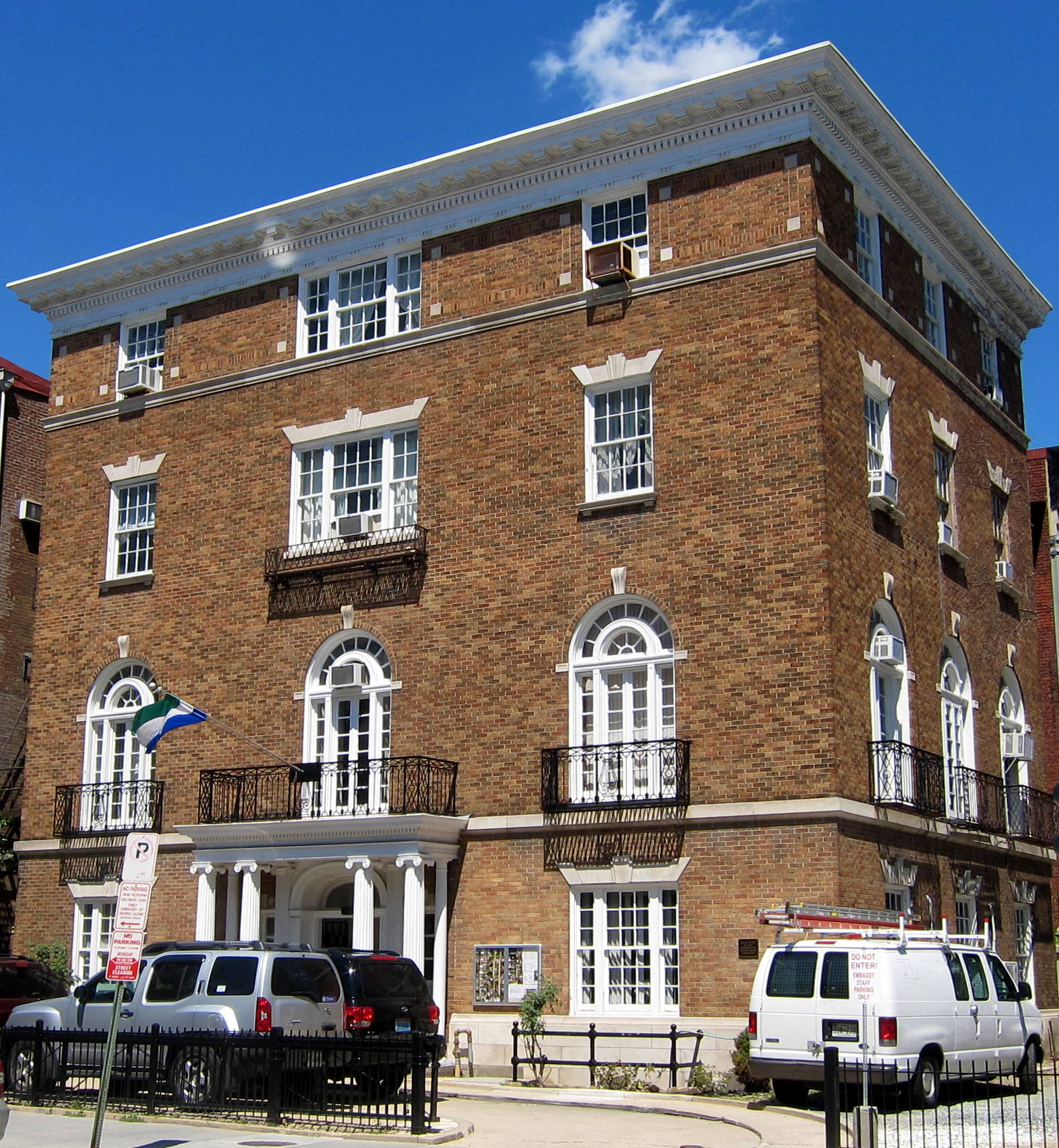
Embassy in Washington, D.C.

== Missions to open ==
- Indonesia
  - Jakarta (Embassy)
- Israel
  - Jerusalem (Embassy)

== Closed missions ==
=== Africa ===
Host country	Host city	Mission	Year closed	Ref.
Libya	Tripoli	Embassy (Note: Resident in Cairo, Egypt)	2014	

=== Americas ===
Host country	Host city	Mission	Year closed	Ref.
Cuba	Havana	Embassy (Note: United Nations Resident in New York City, United States)	1983	

== See also ==
- Foreign relations of Sierra Leone
- List of diplomatic missions in Sierra Leone
- Visa policy of Sierra Leone
