= Kosovo–Sierra Leone relations =

- Kosovo: Sierra Leone

Kosovo–Sierra Leone relations are foreign relations between Kosovo and Sierra Leone.

== History ==
Kosovo declared its independence from Serbia on 17 February 2008. On 11 June 2008, Sierra Leone officially recognized Kosovo as an independent and sovereign state.

On 3 March 2020, the Ministry of Foreign Affairs of Serbia claimed that Sierra Leone had withdrawn its recognition of Kosovo.

On 11 April 2025, at the Antalya Diplomacy Forum, the President of Kosovo, Vjosa Osmani, met with the President of Sierra Leone Julius Maada Bio. Both leaders expressed their commitment to strengthening bilateral relations and extended invitations to each other for official visits to Kosovo and Sierra Leone. The following day, Sierra Leone's government published a press statement where it confirmed the meeting and referred to Kosovo as the "Republic of Kosovo" and mentioned that the sides "focused on deepening bilateral ties and strengthening diplomatic cooperation between the two nations."

== See also ==
- Foreign relations of Kosovo
- Foreign relations of Sierra Leone
