= Minister for Local Government =

Minister for Local Government or Minister of Local Government may refer to:

- Ministry of Local Government and Rural Development (Botswana)
- Minister for Local Government (Ghana)
- Minister for Local Government (New South Wales)
- Minister for Local Government (Victoria)
- Minister for Local Government (Western Australia)
- Minister for Physical Planning and Local Government, Sweden
- Minister for Local Government and Government Business, Wales
- Minister for Local Government and Planning, Scotland
- Minister for Local Government, Territories and Roads, Australia
- Ministry of Local Government and Rural Development (Sierra Leone)
- Minister for the Environment, Community and Local Government, Ireland
- Minister of Housing and Local Government (Malaysia)
- Minister of Local Government (Manitoba)
- Minister of Local Government (New Zealand)
- Minister of Local Government and Regional Development, Norway
- Minister of Health and Local Government (1944-65), Northern Ireland
- Minister for Local Government (United Kingdom)
- Minister of Local Government (Palestine)
