= Tamba Lamina =

Politician of Sierra Leone

Minister of Local Government and Rural Development
- Incumbent
- Assumed office 27 June 2019
- Preceded by: Anthony Brewah

Sierra Leonean High Commissioner to the United Kingdom
- In office 2 August 2018 – May 2019
- Succeeded by: Morie Komba Manyeh

Personal details
- Born: Koidu, Kono District, Sierra Leone
- Spouse: Salma Lamina
- Education: Fourah Bay College; London School of Journalism; Oxford Brookes University; King's College London

Tamba John Sylvanus Lamina is a Sierra Leonean politician and diplomat. He is the current Minister of Local Government and Rural Development in the cabinet of Julius Maada Bio, serving since 2019.

== Early life ==
Born in Koidu, he is a member of the Kono ethnic group. After attending the prestigious Bo School, he received bachelor's degrees in politics, philosophy & history and in education from Fourah Bay College in 1986 and 1987, respectively. He moved to London, where he studied journalism at the London School of Journalism and became a registered nurse. He then received his PgDip in gerontology from Oxford Brooks University in 1997. Lastly, he received his MSc in leadership in healthcare from King's College London in 2006. While in the United Kingdom, he worked in various leadership and managerial positions for both the National Health Service and the private sector.

He has served as chair of the Kono District Descendants Association, Sierra Leone People’s Party UK branch and the Old Bo Boys’ Association. He also chaired the Julius Maada Bio Support Group UK, which led to his entry into national politics.

== Political career ==
Lamina was approved as Sierra Leonean High Commissioner to the United Kingdom by Parliament in August 2018. In February 2019, Lamina hosted a Sierra Leonean diplomatic mission to the United Kingdom. He met with Queen Elizabeth II to discuss development, and then delivered a speech announcing the break of "a new dawn" in Sierra Leonean history.

In May 2019, President Julius Maada Bio reshuffled his cabinet, and Lamina's was promoted from High Commissioner to Minister of Local Government and Rural Development. He was approved by members of Parliament at his new position on June 27, 2019.
