= India–Sierra Leone relations =

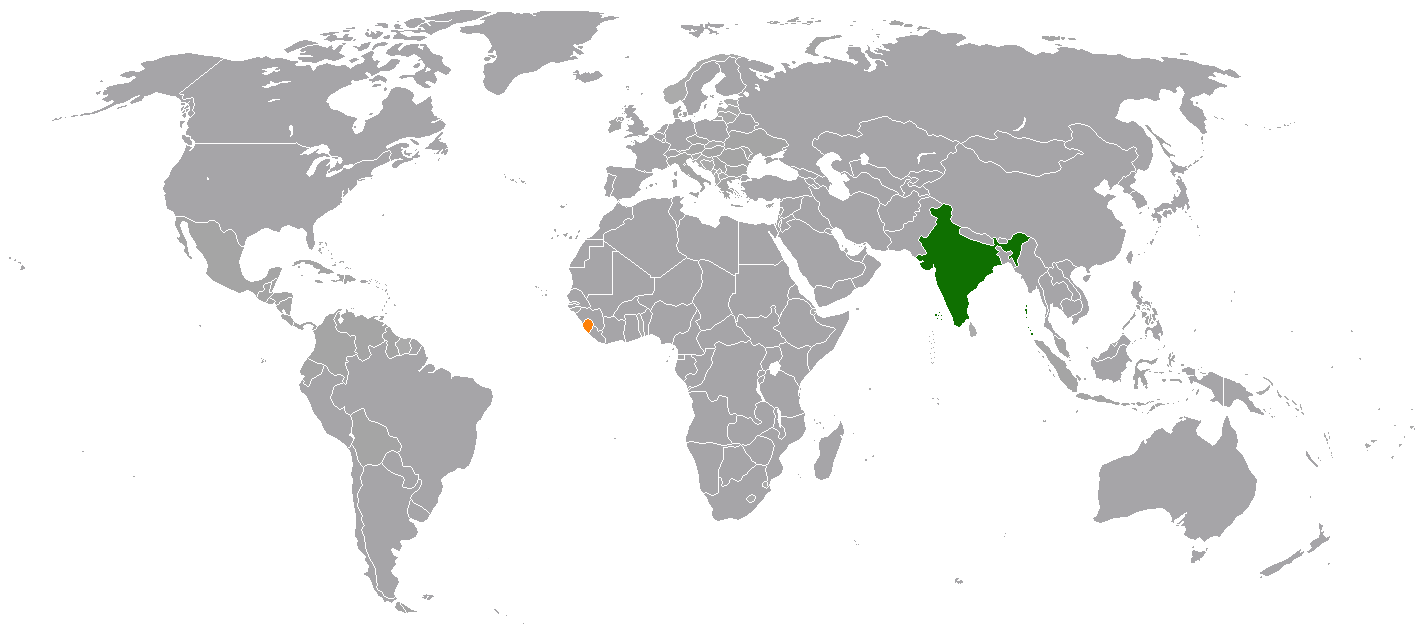
- India: Sierra Leone

Diplomatic mission
- High Commission of India, Freetown: Sierra Leonean Embassy, Abu Dhabi

Envoy
- High Commissioner Rakesh Kumar Arora: Ambassador to the UAE Rashid Sesay

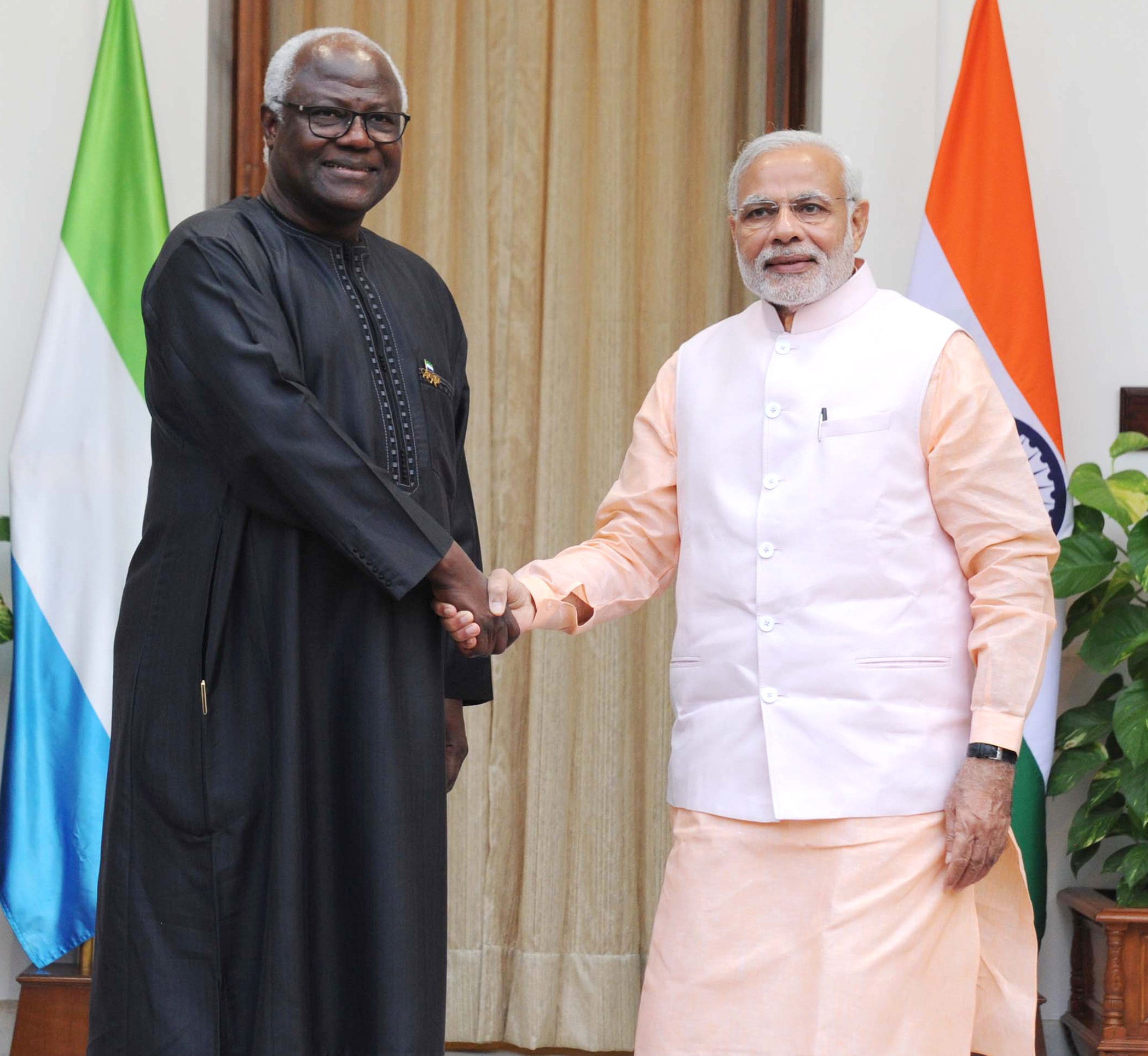
Indian Prime Minister Narendra Modi meeting Sierra Leonean President Ernest Bai Koroma in New Delhi; October 2015.

India–Sierra Leone relations refers to the international relations that exist between India and Sierra Leone. India maintains a High Commission in Freetown. Sierra Leone does not have a resident diplomatic mission in India. The Sierra Leonean embassy in Abu Dhabi, United Arab Emirates is accredited to India.

== History ==
India opened an Honorary Consulate General in Freetown in 1993, functioning under the jurisdiction of the High Commission of India in Accra, Ghana. In July 2019, Finance Minister Nirmala Sitharaman announced that India would open embassies in 18 African countries, including Sierra Leone. The High Commission of India in Freetown was opened in August 2020.

Several high-level ministerial level visits have taken place between the two countries. Sierra Leonean Minister of Industry and Transport A.E. Bangura visited New Delhi in November 1998, becoming the first Sierra Leonean minister to visit India. The Speaker of the Sierra Leone Parliament, accompanied by two members of Parliament, visited New Delhi in January 2003. Foreign Minister Alhaji Momodu Koroma and Trade and Industry Minister Kadi Sesay visited New Delhi in November 2005. Koroma visited the country again in January 2007. Several other Sierra Leonean minister and members of Parliament have also visited India.

The first visit by an Indian minister to Sierra Leone occurred in July 2000, when Defence Minister George Fernandes visited the country. The next visit by an Indian minister to the country came almost a decade later when Minister of State for External Affairs Anand Sharma visited in January 2009. Bihar's Deputy Chief Minister Sushil Kumar Modi visited Sierra Leone to attend the "Sierra Leone Conference on Development and Transformation" in early 2012. Minister of State for Water Resources Ram Kripal Yadav visited Sierra Leone as the Prime Minister's Special Envoy in July 2015 to invite President Ernest Bai Koroma to attend the 3rd India-Africa Forum Summit. Koroma visited India to attend the Summit in October 2015 becoming the first Sierra Leonean President to visit the country, and also held bilateral talks with Prime Minister Narendra Modi.

Indian Vice President Venkaiah Naidu visited Sierra Leone on 12–14 October 2019, accompanied by Minister of State for Animal Husbandry, Dairy and Fisheries Sanjeev Kumar Balyan and Rajya Sabha MP from Chhattisgarh Ramvichar Netam. Naidu met with Sierra Leonean President Brig (retd) Julius Maada Bio and signed several MoUs to set up a joint commission, hold regular Foreign Office Consultations (FOC), cultural exchange, and conducting training and exchange programmes for Sierra Leonean diplomats. Naidu also met with Speaker Abass Bundu and Foreign Minister Nabeela Tunis, and interacted with the Indian community in Sierra Leone.

The first FOC between the two countries was held in Sierra Leone in March 2021.

== Trade ==
Bilateral trade between India and Sierra Leone totaled US$139.86 million in 2019–20, recording a growth of 12.80% over the previous fiscal. India is among the top 5 exporters to Sierra Leone, and exported $115.37 million worth of goods to the country in 2019–20. India made $24.49 million worth of imports from Sierra Leone during the same period, a growth of 108.86% over the previous year. The main commodities exported by India to Sierra Leone are pharmaceuticals, plastics, non-basmati rice, two and three wheelers, industrial machinery, electrical machinery and goods, ceramic products, articles of iron and steel, and aluminium. The major commodities imported by India from Sierra Leone are ferrous waste and scrap, wood pulp, waste paper and small quantities of titanium ores.

In June 2010, Bharti Airtel struck a deal to buy Zain's mobile operations in 15 African countries, including Sierra Leone, for $8.97 billion, in India's second biggest overseas acquisition after Tata Steel's US$13 billion buy of Corus in 2007. Bharti Airtel completed the acquisition on 8 June 2010. In January 2016, Airtel announced that it had entered into an agreement to sell its operations in Burkina Faso and Sierra Leone to French telecom company Orange S.A. The value of the deal was not disclosed, but analysts estimated it to be worth $800–900 million. Orange assumed control of operations in Sierra Leone in July 2016. Indian investment firm ABG Group in partnership with Sierra Leone Exploration Mining Company (SLEMCO) discovered an estimated 321 million MT of bauxite deposits in Sierra Leone in 2011.

There were over 60 Indian-owned companies based in the country as of December 2016, of which around 20 are trading companies.

In December 2021, The Ambassador of Sierra Leone to India His Excellency Rashid Sesay was welcomed by Dr. Asif Iqbal, President of IETO and various trade initiatives were discussed including the visit of Multisectoral Indian Delegation to Sierra Leone.

== Development assistance ==
India provides development assistance to Sierra Leone primarily through concessional lines of credit (LOC) and through the ECOWAS Bank for Investment and Development. As of June 2021, India had provided over US$250 million worth of development assistance to Sierra Leone.

India provided US$15 million for agricultural projects including procurement of tractors, harvesters, rice threshers, rice mills, maize shellers and pesticide spray equipment in 2008. A $29.45 million line of credit was provided in 2010 for modernization and expansion of state-owned Sierratel's network and infrastructure, and for the procurement of buses for university and tertiary institutions. India provided $30 million for rehabilitation of existing potable water facilities and addition of new infrastructure to supply potable water in 2010, $20 million for public lighting of Freetown and 13 municipal headquarters through solar energy in 2011, and $78 million to build transmission lines and sub-stations in 2016.

In 2018, IBSA (India, Brazil, South Africa) approved a $1 million contribution from the IBSA Fund to expand digital financial services among women, youth, micro, small and medium enterprises in Sierra Leone. In 2019, India provided $45 million for irrigation development in Tomabum aimed at making Sierra Leone self-sufficient in rice production, and for the expansion of rehabilitation of potable water facilities in four communities in Sierra Leone. A $32 million LOC was extended for the construction of the University of Science & Technology at Koidu Town, Kono District in 2020.

=== Humanitarian aid and other assistance ===
India donated 200 military barracks to Sierra Leone in January 2009, which were built by a public sector undertaking. India donated 29 packages of indelible ink in May 2007 for use in Sierra Leone's presidential and parliamentary elections held in September 2007. India also donated 40,000 tonnes of rice to Sierra Leone in June 2008 to meet urgent needs. India implemented the Pan-African e-Network project in Sierra Leone in 2010. In December 2014, India donated $12 million to the United Nations Ebola Response Fund and $50,000 to the World Health Organization to help fight the ebola virus outbreak in Sierra Leone, Liberia and Guinea. The country also donated $50,000 worth of medical equipment and medicines directly to the Government of Sierra Leone. The Permanent Mission of India to the United Nations donated $100,000 to the Special Court for Sierra Leone and $50,000 towards relief efforts for damages caused by floods and mudslide in August 2017. India donated a large consignment of medicines in February 2021 to help Sierra Leone fight the COVID-19 pandemic. India donated 1,000 tonnes of rice to Sierra Leone in March 2021. India shipped 96,000 doses of the Covishield vaccine produced by the Serum Institute of India through COVAX to Freetown on 8 March 2021. India will provide Sierra Leone around 528,000 doses of vaccine through COVAX.

The Government of India offers scholarships and fellowships to Sierra Leonean citizens to pursue under-graduate, post-graduate and research courses in India under the Indian Technical and Economic Cooperation Programme (ITEC) and the Indian Council for Cultural Relations (ICCR).

A group of Sierra Leonean women who attended the ITEC Rural Solar Electrification course at the Barefoot College of Tilonia returned to Sierra Leone and successfully installed a solar energy system in their villages. In 2018, five officers from the National Digital Crime Resource and Training Centre of the Sardar Vallabhbhai Patel National Police Academy visited Sierra Leone and provided training to the Cyber Crimes Bureau of the Sierra Leone Police. India organized a special 3-week training programme for Sierra Leonean officials in May 2021 to prepare them for the country's upcoming ICAO Safety Audit later in the year.

India and Sierra Leone signed an MoU for the latter to join India's Pan-African tele-education and tele-medicine initiatives called e-VidyaBharati and e-ArogyaBharati in October 2019. As of June 2021, over 200 Sierra Leonean students were enrolled in various courses at Indian educational institutions virtually through the e-VidyaBharati programme. India has also offered to establish an ICT Centre of Excellence in Sierra Leone.

India sent 1,000 metric tons of rice on 24 March 2026 to support Sierra Leone's school midday meal scheme.

Sierra Leoneans often visit India to study in the country or to seek medical treatment.

== Cultural relations ==
An MoU to facilitate a cultural exchange programme and foster friendly people-to-people ties was signed by the two countries in October 2019.

The International Day of Yoga has been observed in Freetown annually since 2015. A Kathak dance troupe sponsored by the Ministry of Culture visited Freetown in January 2018.

== Indians in Sierra Leone ==
The Indian community in Sierra Leone dates back to the late 19th century when Indian traders arrived in the country. Records indicate that there were at least 600 Indians in Sierra Leone by 1977, two-thirds of whom were traders while the rest were teachers and experts. As of June 2021, about 3,000 Indians reside in Sierra Leone. Most of the community is involved in trade and manufacturing, and some are engaged in the mining and trading of gold and diamonds.

Indians have established several trading companies and small industrial units in Sierra Leone's agro-processing and consumer durable sectors. There were over 60 Indian-owned companies based in the country as of December 2016. The Choithram Trust, run by the Indian-owned Choitram Group, operates a charitable hospital in Sierra Leone.

The Indian Mercantile Association is the sole Indian community association in the country. There is one Hindu temple in Sierra Leone located in Freetown.

=== Peacekeepers ===
Four thousand Indian troops served in the United Nations Mission in Sierra Leone (UNAMSIL) from December 1999 to January 2001. Major General V.K. Jetley was the UNAMSIL Force Commander, and Brigadier S.C. Joshi served as the head of a 10-member Military Liaison Unit attached to the Office of the Special Envoy of the Secretary General for Sierra Leone. The Indian contingent of UNAMSIL accounted for 25% of the total strength and were the best-equipped among contributing nations. After serving in the mission for two years, India announced that it would withdraw its troops and military observers from Sierra Leone in September 2000. The withdrawal was carried out in phases and completed in January 2001.

== See also ==
- High Commission of India, Freetown
- Foreign relations of India
- Foreign relations of Sierra Leone
