= Edward Turay =

Sierra Leonean politician (1945–2023)

Edward Mohamed Turay
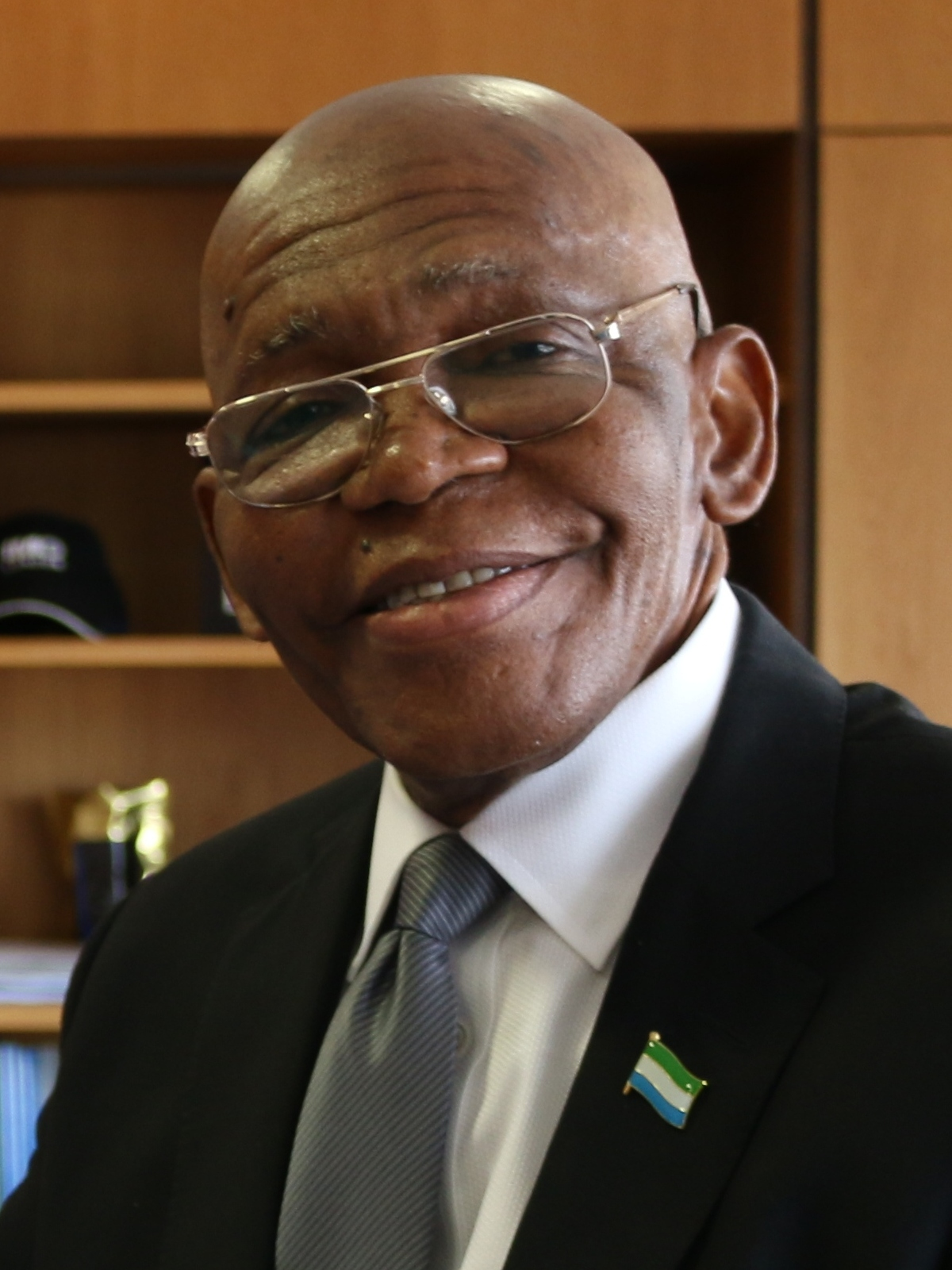
- Turay in 2017

Sierra Leonean High Commissioner to the United Kingdom
- In office 12 March 2010 – 25 June 2023
- Preceded by: Sulaiman Tejan-Jalloh
- Succeeded by: Vacant

Personal details
- Born: 24 October 1945 Makeni, Sierra Leone Colony and Protectorate
- Died: 25 June 2023 (aged 77) London, England

Edward Mohamed Turay (24 October 1945 – 25 June 2023) was a Sierra Leonean politician and diplomat. He was leader of the opposition All People's Congress (APC) from 1996 to 2002. He was the Sierra Leonean High Commissioner to the United Kingdom from 2010 until his death in 2023.

== Background ==
=== Education and early years ===
Turay was born on 24 October 1945. He came from the Temne tribe of northern Sierra Leone, and was from Makeni. He was a barrister by profession, having studied law at Manchester University, and been called to the bar at Lincoln's Inn in 1976. Returning to Sierra Leone in 1979, he was a magistrate for three years before engaging in politics in 1982. He was the founder and consultant of Eddie Turay & Associates, a leading law firm in Freetown, Sierra Leone.

=== Political career ===
In 1986 Turay won a seat as a Member of Parliament for Bombali Central one Constituency. He was re-elected to parliament from Bombali District's Constituency 33 in the August 2007 parliamentary election, receiving 73.2% of the vote.

Turay was leader of the All People's Congress (APC) from 1996 until 2002. He contested the 1996 national election for president, but lost the election after gaining just 5.1% of the first round of voting, good enough for fifth place. He was then Minority Leader of the House of Parliament from 1996 to 2002. Ernest Bai Koroma since took over as parliamentary leader and presidential candidate of the APC, beginning in 2002. On 25 September 2007, when the members of parliament were sworn in, Turay was appointed leader of the Majority Party, in which position he was also Leader of Government Business.

In January 2010, Turay was appointed Sierra Leone's High Commissioner to the United Kingdom of Great Britain and Northern Ireland, accredited to eight other states: Cyprus, Ireland, Spain, Portugal, Norway, Denmark, Sweden and Greece. Turay held the position for the rest of his life.

In May 2014, Turay was awarded the Grassroot Diplomat Initiative Award under the Business Driver category for his extensive work on galvanising diaspora communities across Europe, bringing better visibility to his country and people.

== Writing ==
Turay was the author of an autobiographical book entitled The Prophecies of a Father (AuthorHouse, 2013), which "revolves around the traditional beliefs and faith of his late father, Paramount Chief Kande Turay of Sanda Chiefdom. Turay’s father comes to represent a benevolence and acceptance of integrating Western beliefs and education with traditional African beliefs."

== Death ==
Turay died in London on 25 June 2023, at the age of 77. At the time of his death, he was still the Sierra Leonean High Commissioner to the United Kingdom.
