= Israel–Sierra Leone relations =

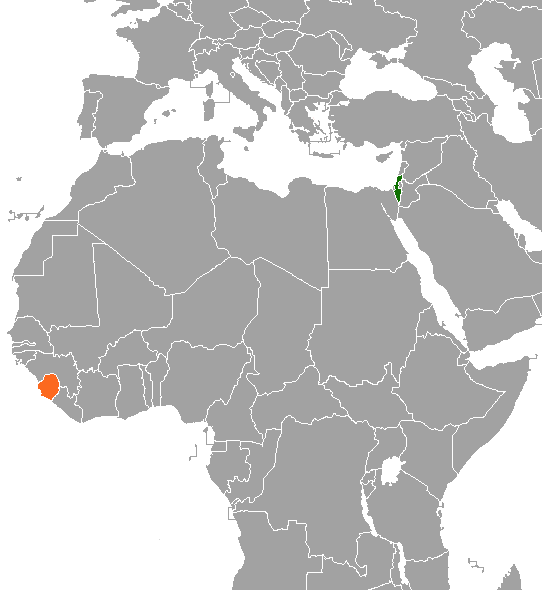
- Israel: Sierra Leone

Israel–Sierra Leone relations are the official and diplomatic relations between the State of Israel and the west African Republic of Sierra Leone. Both nations have friendly ties, established in 1961 when Sierra Leone gained independence. Israel has no embassy in Freetown, and is represented through its embassy in Senegal. Likewise, Sierra Leone does not maintain a diplomatic representation in Israel, and is instead represented by its honorary consul, Israeli media personality David Ben Basat. In August 2023, Sierra Leone announced its intention to open an embassy in Jerusalem.

Israel aids Sierra Leone in many fields. Israel has even donated a dialysis machine to a hospital in Freetown, which serves the county's entire population of roughly 6 million.

Sierra Leone's first prime minister Sir Milton Margai was a supporter of Israel, expressing support for the Zionist project in the 1920s and 1930s, and celebrating in the late 1940s when Israel succeeded in achieving statehood. In the late 1980s and early 1990s, President Joseph Saidu Momoh was also outspokenly supportive of Israel and had a good relationship with Israeli prime minister Yitzhak Shamir.

Sierra Leonean president Ernest Bai Koroma visited Israel in 2017 and met with Israeli prime minister Benjamin Netanyahu. Koroma praised the long lasting warm ties between the two nations, and invited Netanyahu to visit Sierra Leone.

Sierra Leone abstained on the UN vote in 1975 which defined Zionism as racism. Later, in 1991, Sierra Leone supported a UN resolution that rescinded the former resolution from 1975. Currently Israel and Sierra Leone have very positive relations. Sierra Leonean diplomat Adikalie Foday Sumah visited Israel in 2019 as part of a delegation of United Nations ambassadors, and was so impressed by what he saw that he founded an organization to promote ties between the two countries and help change voting patterns against Israel at the UN.

== See also ==
- Foreign relations of Israel
- Foreign relations of Sierra Leone
