= Bockarie Stevens =

Sierra Leonean diplomat

Bockarie Kortu Stevens

Ambassador to the United States
- In office October 2007 – April 2018
- President: Ernest Bai Koroma
- Preceded by: Sulaiman Tejan-Jalloh

Ambassador to Guinea
- In office 1986–1992
- President: Joseph Saidu Momoh

Personal details
- Born: 30 December 1950 (age 75) Moyamba, Moyamba District, British Sierra Leone
- Party: All People's Congress (APC)
- Spouse: Musu Stevens
- Children: 5
- Education: Fourah Bay College; University of East London
- Profession: Social activist

Bockarie Kortu Stevens (born 30 December 1950) is a Sierra Leonean diplomat and the current Sierra Leonean Ambassador to the United States; and also Sierra Leone's permanent representative to the World Bank and the International Monetary Fund (IMF). He is the son of Sierra Leone's first president Siaka Stevens.

In October 2007, Bockarie Stevens was appointed as Sierra Leone's Ambassador to the United States by Sierra Leone's president Ernest Bai Koroma. Bockarie Stevens is a prominent member of the All People's Congress (APC) political party.

From 1986 to 1992, Bockarie Stevens served as Sierra Leone's ambassador to Guinea, under then Sierra Leone's president Joseph Saidu Momoh, who was one of the closest allies to his father, Siaka Stevens, who personally hand-picked Momoh to succeed him to the presidency when he retired in 1985.

Bockarie Stevens is a 1975 graduate from Fourah Bay College, University of Sierra Leone with a B.A. in History and Politics. He earned a Diploma in Industrial Relations and Personnel Management from the London School of Economics and Political Science in June 1982, and an M.A. in Refugee Studies from the University of East London in 2002.

== Family ==
Bockarie Kortu Stevens was born on 30 December 1950 in Moyamba, Moyamba District in the Southern Province of British Sierra Leone. His paternal uncle was former Sierra Leone's president, Siaka Stevens, who ruled Sierra Leone between 1967 and 1988, mostly under a one-party state.

== Education ==
Bockarie Stevens attended and graduated from Albert Academy secondary school in Freetown. The same secondary school his father, the late former Sierra Leone's president, Siaka Stevens had attended years earlier. Fourah Bay College, University of Sierra Leone. Bockarie Stevens is a 1975 graduate from Fourah Bay College, University of Sierra Leone with a B.A. in History and Politics. He earned a Diploma in Industrial Relations and Personnel Management from the London School of Economics and Political Science in June 1982, and an M.A. in Refugee Studies from the University of East London in 2002.

== Diplomatic career ==
In 1986, Bockarie Stevens was appointed by then Sierra Leone's president Joseph Saidu Momoh as Sierra Leone's ambassador to Guinea, and he served as Sierra Leone's ambassador to Guinea until 1992 when the a group of junior officers in the Sierra Leone military ousted the Sierra Leone government in a bloodless military coup.

== Family and children ==
Bockarie Stevens is married to Musu Stevens, and they have five children.
