= Canada–Sierra Leone relations =

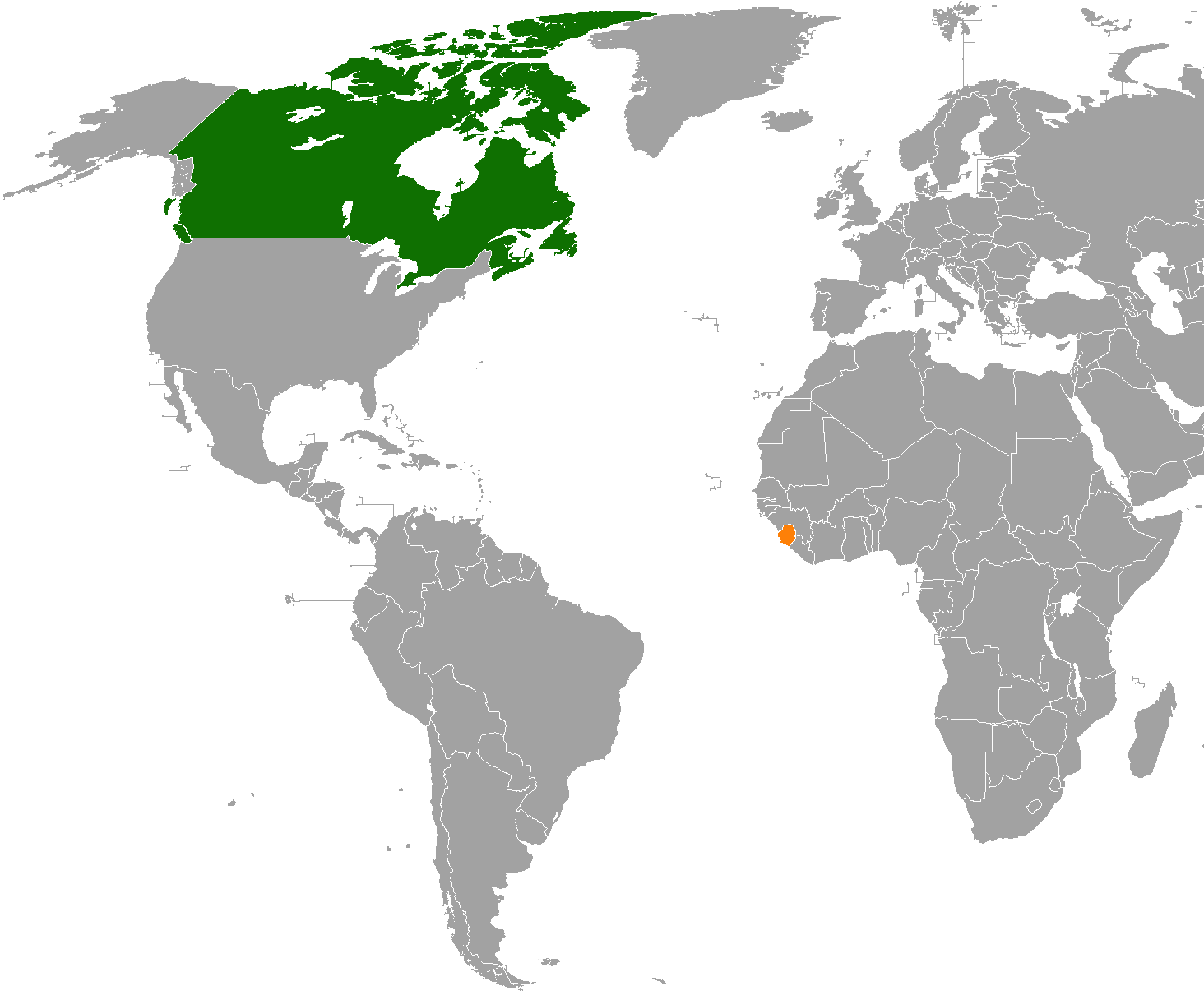

- Canada: Sierra Leone

Bilateral relations between Canada and Sierra Leone were first established in 1961, when Sierra Leone gained its independence. Canada is represented in Sierra Leone through its High Commission in Accra, Ghana. Sierra Leone is represented in Canada through its embassy in Washington, D.C.

Canada and Sierra Leone are both members of the Commonwealth of Nations.

== History ==
Canada and Sierra Leone first established diplomatic ties in 1961. The two countries cooperate in many areas, including the UN Peacebuilding Commission.

Canada and Sierra Leone are connected by a unique historical link. Freetown, the capital of present-day Sierra Leone, was founded in 1792 by a contingent of over one thousand settlers, including some from Halifax and other areas of Nova Scotia. These were mostly former slaves from the United States who had sought freedom in the remaining British territories in North America following the American war of independence. Even today, one can see the influence of the Canadian Maritime provinces in Freetown in the style of construction and the names of streets and businesses. This affinity is reflected today in the good working relationship, which allows Canada and Sierra Leone to cooperate on a broad spectrum of issues in various forums, including the United Nations Peacebuilding Commission.

== Military ==
In 2017, the Royal Canadian Navy visited Sierra Leone.

== Mining industry ==
During the Sierra Leone Civil War the Toronto company, Rex Diamond Mining Corp. gave $3.8 million US worth of military equipment to the Sierra Leone government. Amcan Minerals Ltd., another Canadian company, bought the security firm ArmSec International of South Africa and hired Edwin D. Sanford, a retired Lieutenant Colonel of the Canadian Armed Force to lead its Sierra Leone operations. DiamondWorks Ltd. partnered with Executive Outcomes to take possession of the Koidu mines from the Revolutionary United Front. Executive Outcomes used helicopter gunships and airburst explosives that destroyed all life within a 1.6-kilometre radius. In 1998, a member of Executive Outcomes pitched to Vancouverite mining financiers another anti-RUF military operation to facilitate bauxite mining.

== See also ==
- Foreign relations of Canada
- Foreign relations of Sierra Leone
