= Embassy of Sierra Leone, Washington, D.C. =

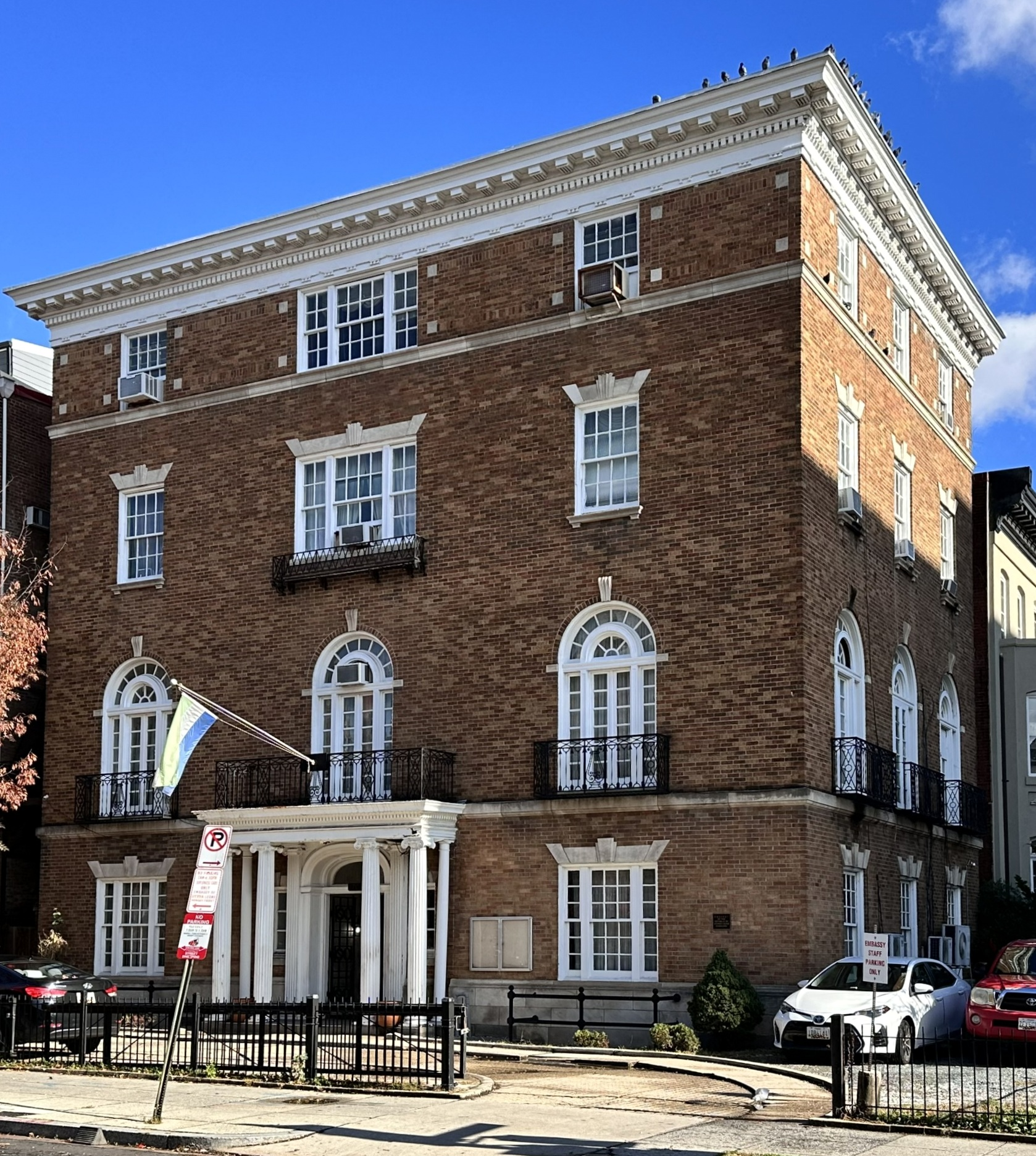
- Embassy of Sierra Leone in 2023
- Location: Washington, D.C.
- Address: 1701 19th Street, N.W.
- Coordinates: 38°54′46″N 77°2′35″W
- Ambassador: Bockari Kortu Stevens

The Embassy of Sierra Leone in Washington, D.C. is the Republic of Sierra Leone's diplomatic mission to the United States. It is located at 1701 19th Street NW, in the Dupont Circle neighborhood.

The current ambassador is Sidique Abu-Bakarr Wai.

== Building ==
Built in 1917 to the designs of noted architect Jules Henri de Sibour, the 21-room Beaux-Arts building was formerly a private residence and is designated as a contributing property to the Dupont Circle Historic District, listed on the National Register of Historic Places in 1978. Former occupants include U.S. Senator Frank B. Kellogg, Assistant Secretary of State Joseph P. Cotton, philanthropist and diplomat Myron C. Taylor, and the United Nations Club.

== See also ==
- Foreign relations of Sierra Leone
- Sierra Leone – United States relations
