= Lillian Resler Harford =

American historian

Lillian R. Harford
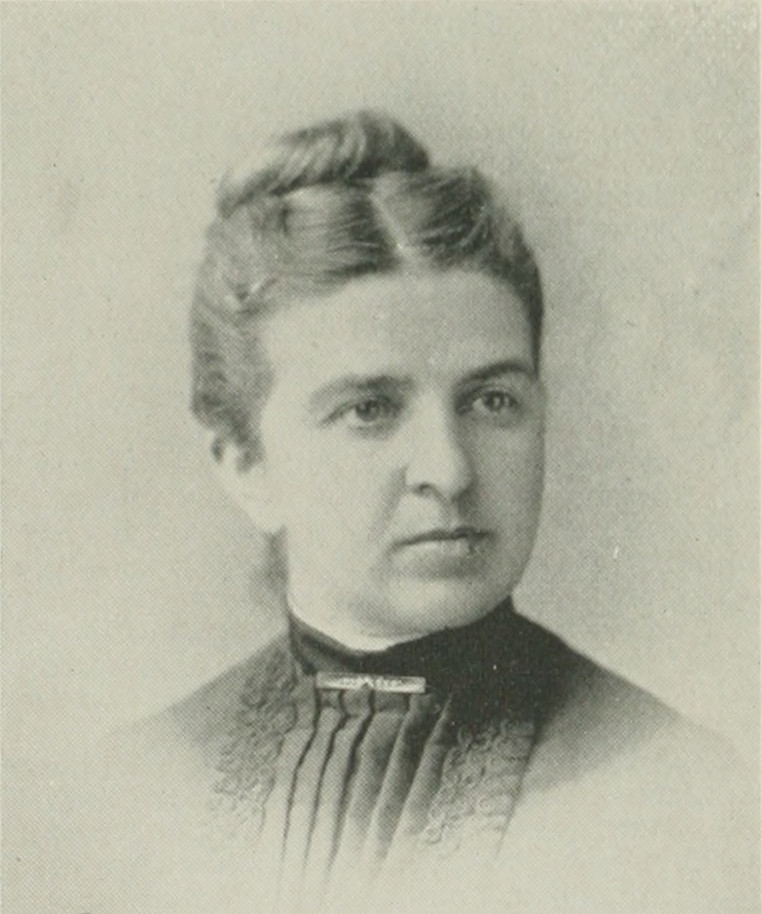
- Photo in A Woman of the Century
- Born: Lillian A. Resler; May 15, 1851; Mount Pleasant, Pennsylvania, U.S.
- Died: April 17, 1939 (aged 87); Westerville, Ohio
- Resting place: Otterbein Cemetery, Westerville, Ohio, U.S.
- Other name: "Lillie" or "Lizzie"
- Education: Otterbein University
- Occupations: organizer; editor; author
- Spouses: George Keister (m. 1875; died 1880); William P. Harford (m. 1893; died 1910)
- Writing career
- Genre: history
- Notable work: History of the Women's Missionary Association of the United Brethren in Christ

Signature
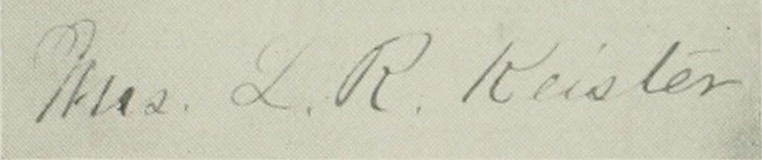

Lillian Resler Harford (née, Resler; May 15, 1851 – April 17, 1939) was an American church organizer, editor, and author. She was an active worker in the Woman's Missionary Association of her church, the United Brethren in Christ, and delivered lectures for the Women's Missionary Society. In 1880, she was one of the two delegates sent by the Association to the World's Missionary Conference in London She became the longest-serving president of the Association.

== Early life and education ==
Lillian (nicknames, "Lillie" or "Lizzie") A. Resler (Note: According to the Archives of the Susquehanna Conference of the United Methodist Church, her maiden name was "Ressler".) (Note: According to the Fire Underwriters' Association of the Northwest (1911), her married name was "Kiester".) (Note: According to the Princeton Theological Seminary (1891), her nickname was "Lizzie".) was born in Mount Pleasant, Pennsylvania, May 15, 1851. She was the first of seven children born to Rev. and Mrs. Jacob B. Resler. A brother was named John I.L. Ressler. Rev. Resler (d. 1891) was minister of the United Brethren in Christ church of that city. He, with only a small salary, moved to Westerville, Ohio, to give his children the benefit of Otterbein University, as soon as Keister was ready to enter, which was in 1866. She was graduated with the class of 1872.

== Career ==
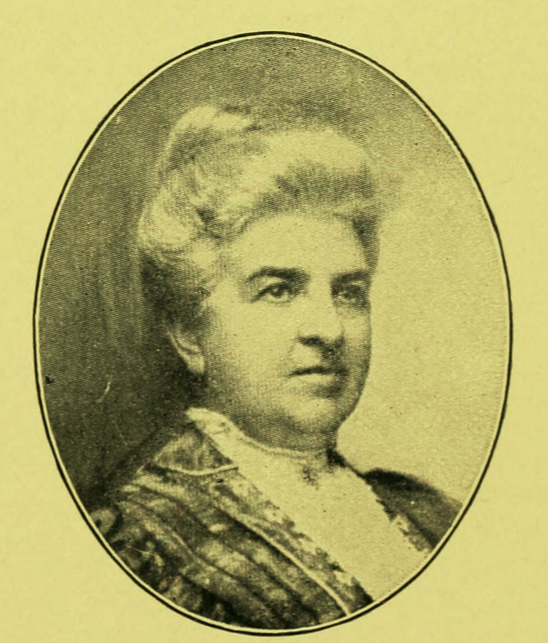

After completing her education, she became a school teacher.

On August 19, 1875, at Westerville, she married Rev. George Keister (b. 1847), professor of Hebrew and Church History in United Theological Seminary, Dayton, Ohio, from 1875. They had no children.

After being widowed in August 1880, Harford became more involved in church work. The church of her choice, the United Brethren in Christ, organized the Woman's Missionary Association in 1875, of which she was corresponding secretary for the first year. The work of the society grew and, in 1881, it called for the full-time of one woman as its corresponding secretary and to establish and edit its organ, the Woman's Evangel. Keister was the available and well-qualified for the position. She was unanimously elected, holding the position in 1875-76 and 1881–1893. Besides the work on the paper, much of her time was spent giving public addresses.

Keister traveled a lot. One year, she traveled in association work over 12,000 miles (19,000 km) in the U.S.. Twice, she went on short trips abroad, first in 1884, when the illness of her sister studying in Germany called her there, and again in 1888, when she was one of two delegates sent by the Woman's Missionary Association to the World's Missionary Conference in London.

== Later life ==
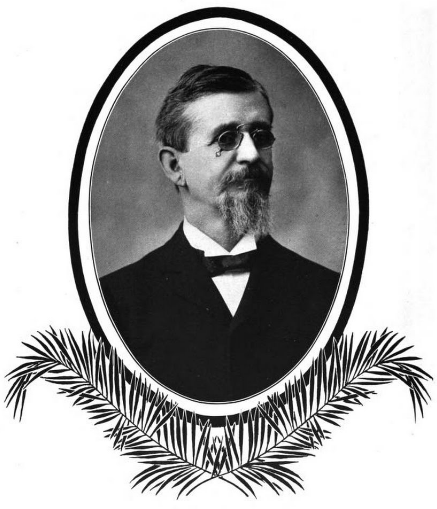
William Harford

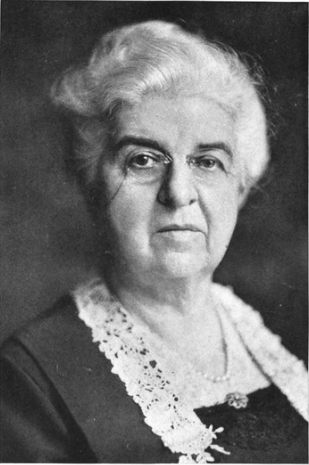
Lillian Harford

On June 14, 1893, she married William P. Harford (1834-1910).

In 1898, Lillian Harford (appears as Mrs. W. P. Harford in the records) was the chairman of the Bureau of Education executive committee for the Trans-Mississippi Exposition in Omaha, Nebraska. Among her roles for the exposition was to the maintain of the Girls and Boys Building. The building was a collection of educational exhibits ranging from kindergarten to the university level. The building also served as an educational building and quasi-day care for children at the exposition.

Harford served as President of the Omaha Woman's Club, Omaha, Nebraska. Between 1905 and 1927, she was president of the Woman's Missionary Association. From 1927 till her death, she served as the Association's honorary president. In 1921, with Alice Estella Bell, she published History of the Women's Missionary Association of the United Brethren in Christ.

== Death and legacy ==
Lillian R. Harford died on April 17, 1939 in Westerville, Ohio. She was buried at the Otterbein Cemetery, Westerville, Ohio, U.S.

The dedication and renaming of the First United Brethren Church of Omaha, Nebraska, at Nineteenth and Lothrop Streets, occurred December 5, 1909, the new name being "The Lillian Resler Harford Memorial United Brethren Church of Omaha". The Harford School for Girls in Moyamba, Sierra Leone is named in her honor.

== Selected works ==
- History of the Women's Missionary Association of the United Brethren in Christ, 1921
