= Sierra Leonean High Commissioner to the United Kingdom =

Coordinates: 51.518864°N 0.117151°W

High commissioner (Commonwealth) of High Commission of Sierra Leone, London
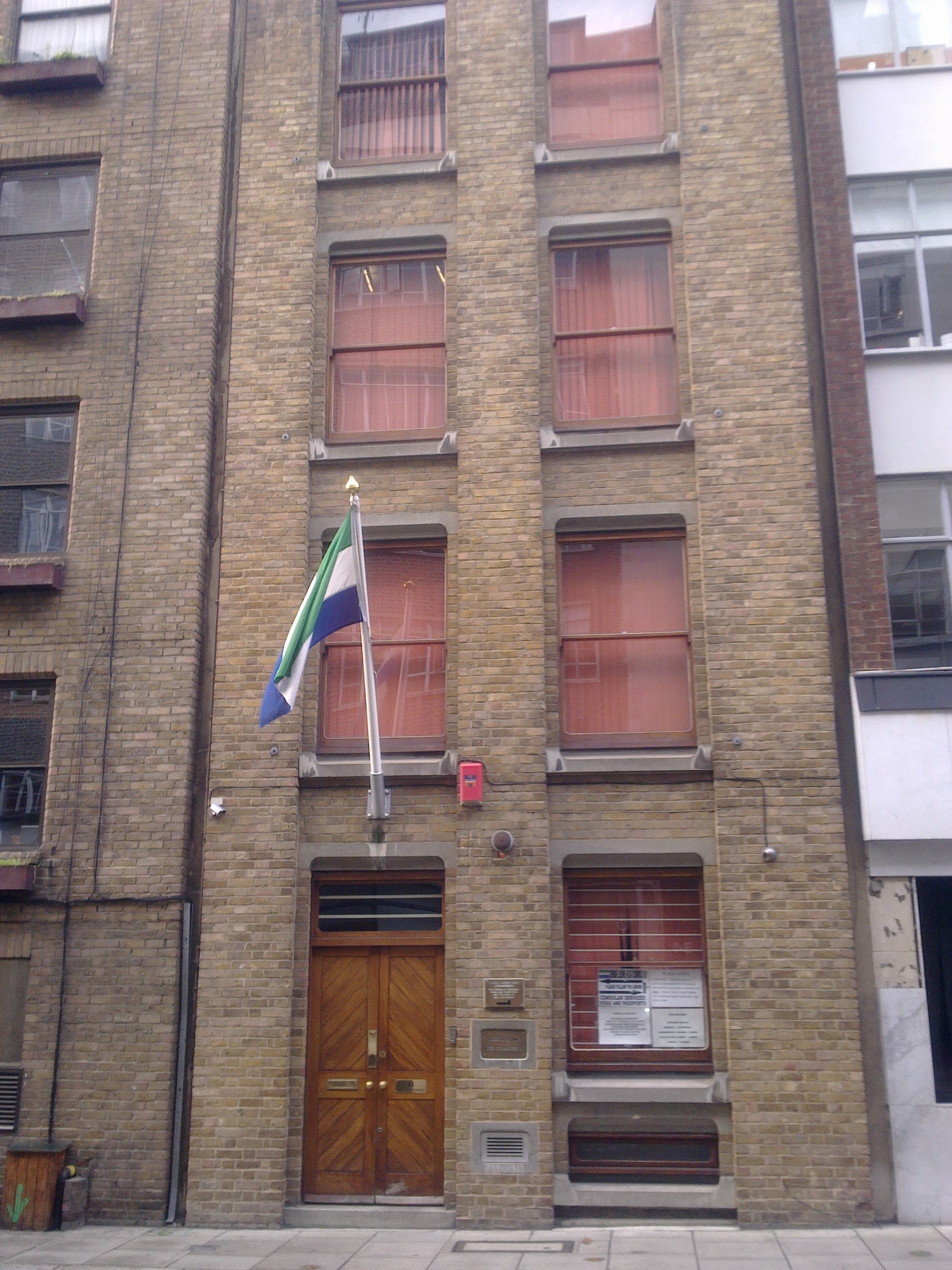
- Incumbent; Vacant
- Inaugural holder: Richard Edmund Kelfa-Caulker
- Formation: 1959

The Sierra Leonean High Commissioner to the United Kingdom is the official representative of the Government of Sierra Leone to the Government of the United Kingdom.

- The Sierra Leone High Commissioner to the Court of St James's is also commissioned to Nicosia (Cyprus), accredited as ambassador to Dublin (Ireland), Madrid (Spain), Lisbon (Portugal), Oslo (Norway), Copenhagen (Denmark), Stockholm (Sweden), and Athens (Greece).

== List of representatives ==
Commissioned/accredited	High commissioner (Commonwealth)	Observations	List of heads of state of Sierra Leone	List of prime ministers of the United Kingdom	Term end
1959	Richard Edmund Kelfa-Caulker	Sierra Leonean and Gambia Commissioner to the United Kingdom	Maurice Henry Dorman	Harold Macmillan	1961
1961	William Henry Fitzjohn		Maurice Henry Dorman	Harold Macmillan	1964
1964	Richard Edmund Kelfa-Caulker	(* 1909; 1975) On Thursday Dr. and Mrs. Fitzjohn had a farewell audience with the Queen at Buckingham Palace. He is succeeded by Mr. Richard Kelfa- Caulker, currently representative at the UN. Mr. Kelfa-Caulker was Dr. Fitzjohn's predecessor in London.	Henry Josiah Lightfoot Boston	Harold Wilson	1966
1967	Victor Sigismond Kanu		Henry Josiah Lightfoot Boston	Harold Wilson	1971
1968	Joseph Ayodele Wilson		Banja Tejan-Sie	Harold Wilson	
July 3, 1968	de:Ambrose Patrick Genda		Banja Tejan-Sie	Harold Wilson	1969
1971	Davidson Nicol	In 1971 he was appointed High Commissioner (with the rank of Ambassador Extraordinary and Plenipotentiary) of the Republic of Sierra Leone to the United Kingdom and concurrently Ambassador of Sierra Leone to the kingdoms of Sweden, Denmark and Norway.	Siaka Stevens	Edward Heath	1972
1972	Jacob Arthur Christian Davies		Siaka Stevens	Edward Heath	October 1974
October 1974	de:Ralph Emeric Kashope Taylor-Smith		Siaka Stevens	Harold Wilson	1977
1978	de:Sahr Thomas Matturi	Corps, Major General Lord Michael Fitzalan Howard, and Dr. Sahr Thomas Matturi setting off for Buckingham Palace to present Dr. Matturi' s Letters of Credence as Sierra Leone's High Commissioner in London.	Siaka Stevens	James Callaghan	September 8, 1980
September 8, 1980	Victor Emmanuel Sumner	(*April 17, 1929 in Freetown) in 1962 married Gladys Victoria Small, they had one daughter two sons. Educated at Fourah Bay College, Sierra Leone; Otterbein College, Westerville, Ohio, U.S.A. and at Laval University. On April 1, 1987 he was retired.	Siaka Stevens	Margaret Thatcher	
April 1, 1987	Caleb Babatundá Aubee	1981-1986 ambassador in Beijing, (es:Anexo:Embajadores de Sierra Leona en China) A new high commissioner is appointed to the UK In May Caleb Babatunde Aubee was appointed Sierra Leone's high commissioner to the UK, succeeding the retiring Victor Sumner. Mr Aubee was previously ambassador in China but also Spouse: Adenrele A Odedina. Mr. Aubee, an active party man, is no stranger to Sierra Leoneans here, since he already served as deputy high commissioner in the early 1980s	Joseph Saidu Momoh	Margaret Thatcher	1991
1993	Cyril Foray	(* March 16, 1934; 2003) After he retired from the college faculty, he was appointed Sierra Leone's high commissioner to the United Kingdom for the period of 1993—1994 under the military government of Valentine Strasser.	Valentine Strasser	John Major	1994
May 25, 1995	Haroun Buhari	Buhari bows out As Sierra Leone's High Commissioner in London bids farewell after two-and-a-half years, West Africa. 1994: Sierra Leone High Commissioner to the Gambia, Alhaji Haroun Buhari, has presented his letters of credence to President Abdou Diouf of Senegal as Ambassador Extraordinary and Plenipotentiary to that country.	Valentine Strasser	John Major	1996
1996	Cyril Foray	which indicates a reluctance on your part to resign. In the circumstances, I am directed by His Excellency the President to inform you that you are hereby dismissed as Sierra Leone's High Commissioner to the United Kingdom with effect from 28 April 2000.	Ahmad Tejan Kabbah	John Major	April 28, 2000
April 28, 2000	British military intervention in the Sierra Leone Civil War		Ahmad Tejan Kabbah	Tony Blair	
April 9, 2000	Sulaiman Tejan-Jalloh		Ahmad Tejan Kabbah	Tony Blair	2005
March 12, 2010	Edward Turay		Ernest Bai Koroma	David Cameron	June 25, 2023 (his death)
