= Harford Secondary School for Girls =

School in Moyamba, Sierra Leone

Harford Secondary School for Girls is a secondary school for girls in Moyamba, Sierra Leone.

== History ==
The roots of the school lie in the Mary Sowers School for Girls, founded by United Brethren in Christ (UBC) missionaries at Rotifunk. The school was closed during the Hut Tax War of 1898, but was reopened as the Moyamba Girls School. In 1903 the school was merged with the UBC's girls' boarding school at Shenge, and buildings were completed and occupied at Rotifunk in 1908. Julius Gulama taught at the school before he became a paramount chief in 1928. In 1921 the school was renamed the Lilian Harford School for Girls, after the American missionary Lillian Resler Keister Harford, and in 1944 the school became a secondary school.

The American missionary Esther L. Megill taught biology at Harford for a year in 1957, and later published her reminiscences of the school. William Henry Fitzjohn served as Principal from 1965 to 1971, alongside his wife Alice, who served as Vice-Principal. Alice Fitzjohn also held the position of acting Principal from 1971 to 1972.

John K. Yambasu, later Bishop, was a senior teacher and school chaplain from 1982 to 1990.[5]

During the Sierra Leone Civil War the school's buildings were badly damaged, and the school has needed to rebuild itself since then.

== Alumni ==
- Lucy Sharon-Mae Anthony, first woman bishop in Sierra Leone.
- Ella Koblo Gulama (1921-2006), Sierra Leone's first female Member of Parliament
- Umu Hawa Tejan-Jalloh (born 1949), Chief Justice of Sierra Leone

Shirley Gbujama (Nee Macaulay),(Born 1936), (Class of 1955), 1st female Ambassador, 1st female Foreign Minister
