= Foreign relations of Sierra Leone =

Sierra Leone maintains formal relations with many Western nations. It also maintains diplomatic relations with the former Soviet Bloc countries as well as with the People's Republic of China.

The government maintains 16 embassies and high commissions around the world.

== Multilateral membership ==
Former President Stevens' government had sought closer relations with West African countries under the Economic Community of West African States (ECOWAS). The present government is continuing this effort.

Sierra Leone is a member of the United Nations and its specialized agencies, the Commonwealth, the African Union, the Economic Community of West African States (ECOWAS), the African Development Bank (AFDB), the Mano River Union (MRU), the Organisation of Islamic Cooperation (OIC), and the Non-Aligned Movement (NAM).

Sierra Leone is also a member of the International Criminal Court with a Bilateral Immunity Agreement of protection for the US-military (as covered under Article 98).

Sierra Leone is a member state of the Commonwealth of Nations.

== Diplomatic relations ==
List of countries which Sierra Leone maintains diplomatic relations with:

#	Country	Date
1	Canada	27 April 1961
2	Egypt	27 April 1961
3	France	27 April 1961
4	Ghana	27 April 1961
5	Israel	27 April 1961
6	Japan	27 April 1961
7	Lebanon	27 April 1961
8	Nigeria	27 April 1961
9	United Kingdom	27 April 1961
10	United States	27 April 1961
11	India	28 April 1961
12	Belgium	12 July 1961
13	Germany	5 September 1961
14	Guinea	20 October 1961
15	Sweden	13 December 1961
16	Benin	1961
17	Burkina Faso	1961
18	Ivory Coast	1961
19	Niger	1961
20	Pakistan	1961
21	Russia	18 January 1962
22	Netherlands	22 February 1962
23	Switzerland	25 May 1962
24	Liberia	8 June 1962
25	South Korea	25 June 1962
26	Sudan	19 August 1962
27	Bulgaria	28 September 1962
28	Senegal	26 October 1962
29	Poland	10 November 1962
30	Italy	1962
31	Mali	1962
32	Czech Republic	3 January 1963
33	Serbia	25 September 1963
34	Morocco	14 November 1963
35	Romania	15 January 1964
36	Spain	6 March 1964
37	Syria	29 November 1964
38	Madagascar	5 November 1966
39	Gambia	10 December 1966
40	Jamaica	15 November 1967
41	Ethiopia	26 March 1968
42	Lesotho	22 October 1968
43	Hungary	10 November 1969
44	Norway	20 July 1970
45	Luxembourg	13 October 1970
46	Turkey	15 February 1971
47	Zambia	19 February 1971
48	China	29 July 1971
49	North Korea	14 October 1971
50	Mauritania	21 October 1971
51	Tanzania	3 November 1971
52	Algeria	7 April 1972
53	Cuba	24 April 1972
54	Saudi Arabia	1 July 1972
55	Denmark	22 January 1973
56	Uganda	10 September 1973
57	Brazil	9 August 1974
58	Argentina	6 September 1974
59	Guyana	25 October 1974
60	Democratic Republic of the Congo	20 January 1975
61	Guinea-Bissau	28 January 1975
62	Portugal	18 February 1975
63	Austria	1 March 1975
64	Trinidad and Tobago	17 July 1975
65	Libya	18 November 1975
66	Bangladesh	22 January 1976
67	Mozambique	12 March 1976
68	Mexico	30 June 1976
69	Albania	23 August 1976
70	Cameroon	30 September 1976
71	Cape Verde	8 January 1978
72	Vietnam	24 June 1978
73	Kenya	16 January 1979
74	Greece	15 May 1979
75	Kuwait	1980
76	Qatar	1980
77	Australia	10 July 1981
78	Iraq	23 June 1982
79	United Arab Emirates	5 October 1982
80	Oman	10 December 1982
81	Thailand	24 December 1982
82	Iran	12 March 1983
83	Equatorial Guinea	March 1983
84	Maldives	14 June 1988
85	Colombia	16 November 1988
86	Peru	15 May 1989
—	State of Palestine	1989
87	Venezuela	29 October 1990
88	Malaysia	28 January 1991
89	Philippines	3 April 1991
90	Indonesia	15 November 1994
91	Azerbaijan	13 March 1995
92	Brunei	10 July 1995
93	Slovakia	21 May 1996
—	Holy See	30 July 1996
94	Georgia	7 April 1997
95	North Macedonia	17 July 1998
96	South Africa	21 August 1998
97	Ukraine	20 May 1999
98	Ireland	19 January 2000
99	Cyprus	22 November 2000
100	Malta	16 October 2001
101	Namibia	18 September 2002
102	Croatia	23 July 2003
103	Belarus	27 September 2003
104	Armenia	19 March 2004
105	Angola	1 November 2004
106	Bahamas	7 November 2006
107	Iceland	13 November 2006
108	Finland	17 June 2008
109	New Zealand	5 March 2009
110	Uruguay	22 September 2010
111	Cambodia	7 October 2010
112	Estonia	10 May 2011
113	Slovenia	10 May 2011
114	Zimbabwe	19 April 2012
115	Jordan	3 December 2012
116	Singapore	9 April 2013
117	Mongolia	27 September 2013
118	Sri Lanka	16 November 2013
119	Rwanda	29 November 2013
120	Lithuania	15 April 2014
121	Montenegro	8 October 2014
122	Kazakhstan	20 November 2014
123	Latvia	12 December 2014
124	Fiji	6 February 2015
125	Ecuador	12 February 2015
126	Botswana	16 February 2015
127	Bosnia and Herzegovina	24 November 2015
—	Kosovo	24 November 2015
128	Burundi	2 March 2016
129	Malawi	8 March 2016
130	Kyrgyzstan	1 November 2016
131	Turkmenistan	15 June 2020
132	Nicaragua	25 September 2020
133	Tajikistan	2 October 2020
134	Chad	13 February 2020
135	Grenada	24 February 2021
136	Nepal	29 June 2021
137	Belize	23 September 2021
138	Bahrain	8 June 2022
139	Moldova	18 August 2022
140	Dominican Republic	19 September 2022
141	Saint Vincent and the Grenadines	12 April 2023
142	Uzbekistan	28 April 2023
143	El Salvador	18 September 2023
144	Saint Lucia	20 September 2023
145	Seychelles	16 February 2025
146	Dominica	24 March 2025
147	Timor-Leste	14 April 2026
148	Andorra	21 September 2026
149	Gabon	Unknown
150	Togo	Unknown
151	Tunisia	Unknown
152	Yemen	Unknown

== Bilateral relations ==
Country	Formal Relations Began	Notes
Canada	27 April 1961	See Canada–Sierra Leone relations Both countries established diplomatic relations on 27 April 1961.
China	29 July 1971	See China–Sierra Leone relations China and Sierra Leone established diplomatic relations on July 29, 1971.
Germany	5 September 1961	See Germany–Sierra Leone relations Both countries established diplomatic relations on 5 September 1961.: Germany has an embassy in Freetown.; Sierra Leone has an embassy in Berlin.
India	28 April 1961	Both countries established diplomatic relations on 28 April 1961 See India–Sierra Leone relations: Sierra Leone's ambassador is accredited from Tehran and India established a resident High Commission in Freetown in 2021, having previously accrerdited its High Commissioner from Accra, Ghana.; Both countries are full members of the Commonwealth of Nations.
Indonesia	15 November 1994	Both countries established diplomatic relations on 15 November 1994; Sierra Leone is accredited to Indonesia through its embassy in Seoul, South Korea.; Indonesia is accredited to Sierra Leone, through its embassy in Dakar, Senegal.
Liberia	8 June 1962	See Liberia–Sierra Leone relations Both countries established diplomatic relations on 8 June 1962 when has been appointed first ambassador of Liberia to Sierra Leone Mr. Henry B. Fahnbulleh.: The two countries signed a non-aggression pact in 2007 when Sierra Leonean President Ernest Bai Koroma took office. In January 2011, an African diplomat described relations as "cordial".
Mexico	30 June 1976	Both countries established diplomatic relations on 30 June 1976: Mexico is accredited to Sierra Leone from its embassy in Accra, Ghana.; Sierra Leone does not have an accreditation to Mexico.
Turkey	15 February 1971	Both countries established diplomatic relations on 15 February 1971: Sierra Leone has an embassy in Ankara.; Turkey has an embassy in Freetown.; Trade volume between the two countries was 53.4 million USD in 2019.; There are direct flights from Istanbul to Freetown.
United Kingdom	27 April 1961	See Foreign relations of the United Kingdom Sierra Leone established diplomatic relations with the United Kingdom in April 1961.: Sierra Leone maintains a high commission in London.; The United Kingdom is accredited to Sierra Leone through its high commission in Freetown.; Both countries share common membership of the Atlantic co-operation pact, the Commonwealth, the International Criminal Court, and the World Trade Organization. Bilaterally the two countries have an Investment Agreement.
United States	27 April 1961	Both countries established diplomatic relations on 27 April 1961 See Sierra Leone–United States relations Embassy of Sierra Leone in Washington, D.C. U.S. relations with Sierra Leone began with missionary activities in the 19th century. In 1959, the U.S. opened a consulate in Freetown and elevated it to embassy status when Sierra Leone became independent in 1961. U.S.-Sierra Leone relations today are cordial, with ethnic ties between groups in the two countries receiving increasing historical interest. Many thousands of Sierra Leoneans reside in the United States. In fiscal year 2006, total U.S. bilateral aid to Sierra Leone in all categories were $29.538 million. U.S. assistance focused on the consolidation of peace, democracy and human rights, health education, particularly combating HIV/AIDS, and human resources development. Currently, the Principal U.S. Official in Sierra Leone is Chargé d'Affaires Glenn Fedzer Sierra Leone's Ambassador to the U.S. is H. E. Bockari Kortu Stevens and the Sierra Leone embassy is located in Washington.

== See also ==
- List of diplomatic missions in Sierra Leone
- List of diplomatic missions of Sierra Leone
