= William Henry Fitzjohn =

Sierra Leonean diplomat

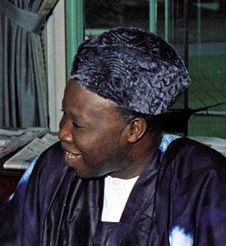
- Fitzjohn in 1961

Sierra Leonean Ambassador to the United States
- In office 27 April 1961 – 18 July 1961
- Succeeded by: Richard Edmund Kelfa-Caulker

Sierra Leonean High Commissioner to the United Kingdom
- In office 18 July 1961 – 1964
- Preceded by: Richard Edmund Kelfa-Caulker
- Succeeded by: Richard Edmund Kelfa-Caulker

Sierra Leonean Ambassador to Nigeria
- In office November 1971 – 1972
- Preceded by: H.C. Mansaray

Personal details
- Born: 5 November 1915 Mattru Jong
- Died: 20 December 1989 (aged 74) Freetown
- Spouse: Muriel Alice Ayodele Cole
- Children: Amelia, Dwight, William Jr., Kwame, Walter, Mamei Katie and Jonathan Musselman
- Parents: Jonathan Fitzjohn (father); Eva Fitzjohn (mother)
- Education: Albert Academy (Freetown), Diploma and Sierra Leone Teachers Certificate.: 1943: Lincoln University (Pa.), B.A..; 1946: United Theological Seminary (Dayton, Ohio), B.D..; 1949: Teachers College, Columbia University (NY), M.A. and Ed.D.; 1962: LL.D (Lincoln).

William Henry Fitzjohn (5 November 1915 – 20 December 1989) was a Sierra Leonean churchman, educator and diplomat.

== Life ==
Fitzjohn was ordained into the ministry of the Evangelical United Brethren Church (Dayton, Ohio) in 1946. From 1950 to 1959, he taught educational sociology and religion at Fourah Bay College, University of Durham, and was associate minister at King memorial, Evangelical United Brethren church. From 1951 to 1959, he was also Member of the Sierra Leone House of Parliament.

From 1959 to 1961, he was Chargé d'affaires in Washington, D.C.. Early in the spring of 1961, a snub turned into an international incident, when he stopped for dinner with his driver at a Howard Johnson's restaurant on the outskirts of Hagerstown, Maryland en route to Pittsburgh for a lecture. Both men were refused service because of their color. President John F. Kennedy, appalled by what had transpired, received Fitzjohn in the White House. The president of Howard Johnson's apologized for the snub while the mayor of Hagerstown, Winslow F. Burhans, invited him to a dinner with several of the city's leading citizens.

From 1961 to 1965, he and his wife served as Principal and Vice-Principal of Harford Secondary School for Girls in Sierra Leone. From 1961 to 1964, he was High Commissioner in London (United Kingdom). In 1962, he became Director of Sierra Leone Selection Trust Ltd. From November 1971 to 1976, he was High Commissioner in Lagos.
