= United Nations Ebola Response Fund =

United Nations Ebola Response Fund is a special fund set up by the United Nations Foundation to allow donations to support U.N. institutions to respond to the Ebola virus epidemic in West Africa. The U.N. has received other money for Ebola, but the fund is more flexible in how it can be spent. The U.N. announced the fund on 12 September 2014.

They asked for one billion dollars to be donated, and by 21 October 2014 50 million had already been pledged. On November 11 the Philippines government announced it would donate 1 million to the fund.

Countries that have pledged or committed money to the fund by 7 November 2014 include Australia, Azerbaijan, Canada, Chile, China, Colombia, Denmark, Estonia, Finland, Germany, India, Ireland, Japan, Kazakhstan, Luxembourg, Malta, New Zealand, Norway, Romania, South Korea, Sweden, the United Kingdom, and Venezuela.

== See also ==
- World Health Organization
