= Ministry of Local Government and Rural Development (Sierra Leone) =

The Ministry of Local Government and Rural Development is a Ministry of the Government of Sierra Leone.

As of 2019 the current of Minister for Local Government and Rural Development is Tamba Lamina.
