= Germany–Sierra Leone relations =

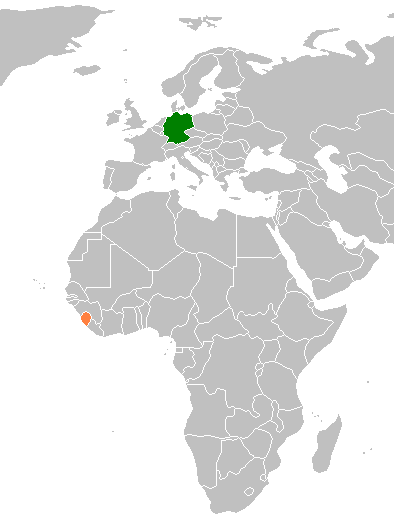

- Germany: Sierra Leone

Germany–Sierra Leone relations are the relations between Germany and Sierra Leone. Both countries have maintained diplomatic relations since 1961. The Federal Foreign Office describes the relationship between the two countries as “friendly”. One focus of relations is development aid, with Germany being one of Sierra Leone's most important donor countries.

== History ==
The European discovery of Sierra Leone by Pedro de Sintra was already known in the German-speaking world in the early 16th century through the anthology Paesi Novamente retrovati, which was printed in Nuremberg. In 1789, the translated travelogue Journey to Sierra Leone on the Western Coast of Africa by John Matthews was published in Leipzig. In 1804, German missionaries of the British Church Mission Society came to Sierra Leone. In 1881, Ernst Vohsen was appointed the first consul of the German Empire in the British colony of Sierra Leone, with the task of promoting the Empire's interests there. When World War I broke out in 1914, Sierra Leone, as part of the British Empire, was at war with Germany for the next four years. The British recruited soldiers and laborers in Sierra Leone to fight against the Germans in German East Africa, Togo and Cameroon.

After Sierra Leone gained independence from the British, West Germany established diplomatic relations with Sierra Leone in 1961. West Germany sent an ambassador and in 1969 Sierra Leone opened its own embassy in Bonn. Two years later, Sierra Leone was also able to establish relations with East Germany until German reunification after West Germany had abandoned the Hallstein Doctrine. The bloody civil war in Sierra Leone also influenced relations with Germany. Between 1999 and 2003, the German Embassy had to be closed. It was not until 2007 that an ambassador could finally be sent again. In 2011, Sierra Leone's President Ernest Koroma visited Germany on a state visit.

During the Ebola epidemic of 2014 to 2016, which hit Sierra Leone particularly hard, Germany provided the country with financial and technical support.

== Economic relations ==
In 2024, German exports of goods to Sierra Leone amounted to 24.6 million euros and imports from the country to 48.5 million euros. Sierra Leone thus ranked 152nd among Germany's trading partners. More than 80 percent of German imports from Sierra Leone consist of the mineral rutile, which is mined in the country.

Germany is one of the most important providers of development aid, alongside the United States and the United Kingdom. The Deutsche Gesellschaft für Internationale Zusammenarbeit (GIZ) and its predecessor organizations have been active in the country since 1963. In 2010, it reopened a regional office in Freetown, which is responsible for Sierra Leone and neighboring Liberia. GIZ employs almost 100 people in Sierra Leone.

Bilateral cooperation focuses on youth employment, education and agriculture. Projects to prevent HIV/AIDS and strengthen women's rights are also supported. In 2015, a trilateral agreement was signed between the agriculture ministries of Germany and Sierra Leone and the Food and Agriculture Organization of the United Nations to promote the implementation of the United Nations Voluntary Guidelines on the Responsible Governance of Tenure of Land, Fisheries and Forests in the Context of National Food Security. According to the BMZ, Germany has provided training and further education to over 50,000 young people in Sierra Leone and advised more than 2,500 companies. It has supported the construction of deep wells, rice mills and grain stores with solar panels, as well as the renovation of markets and rural access roads.

Germany has provided financial support to the Sierra Leone Truth and Reconciliation Commission and the Special Court for Sierra Leone.

== Diplomatic locations ==
- Germany operates an embassy in Freetown.
- Sierra Leone has an embassy in Berlin.
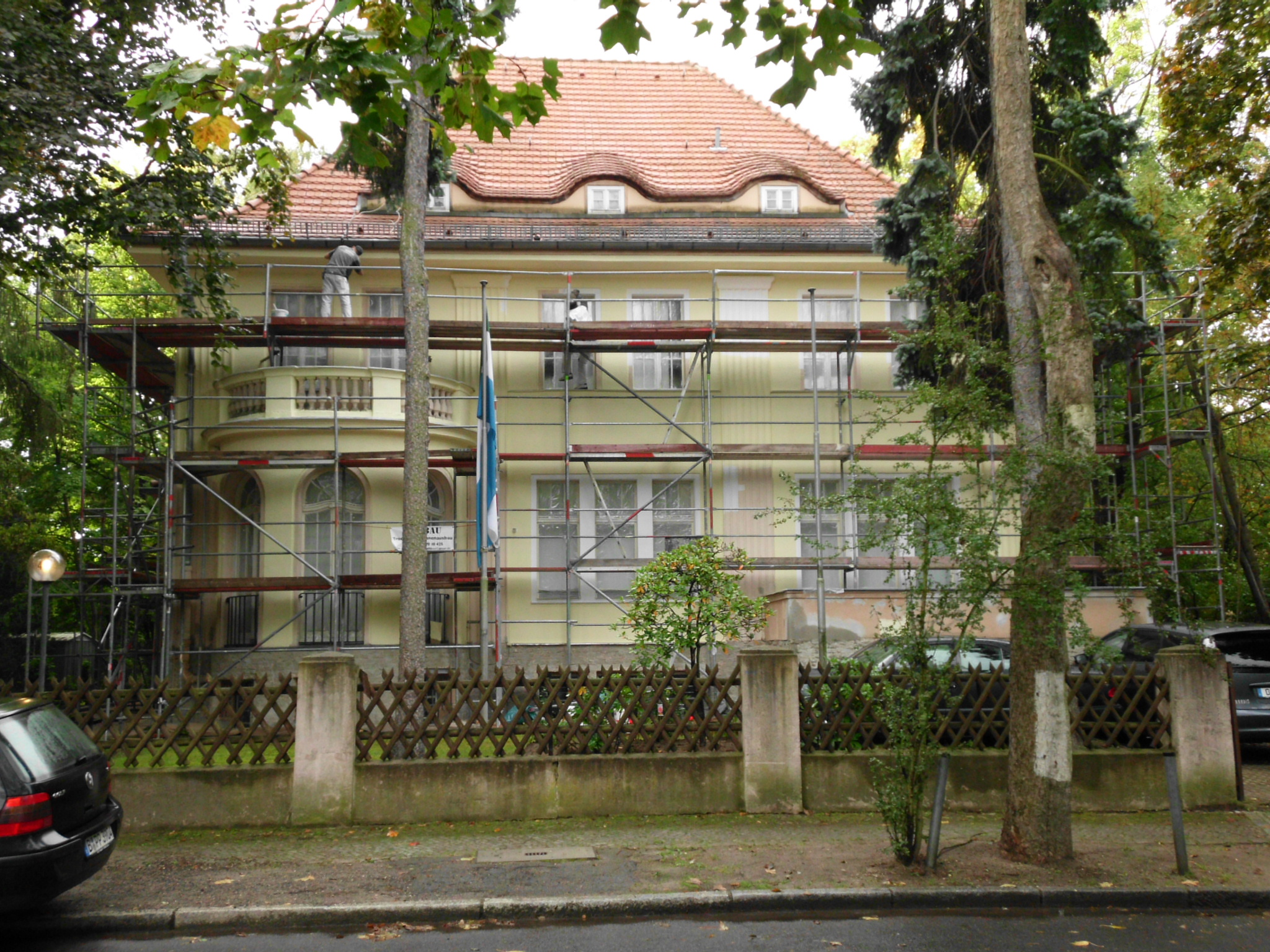
Embassy of Sierra Leone in Berlin
