= List of diplomatic missions in Sierra Leone =

This is a list of diplomatic missions in Sierra Leone. At present, the capital city of Freetown hosts 23 embassies/high commissions.

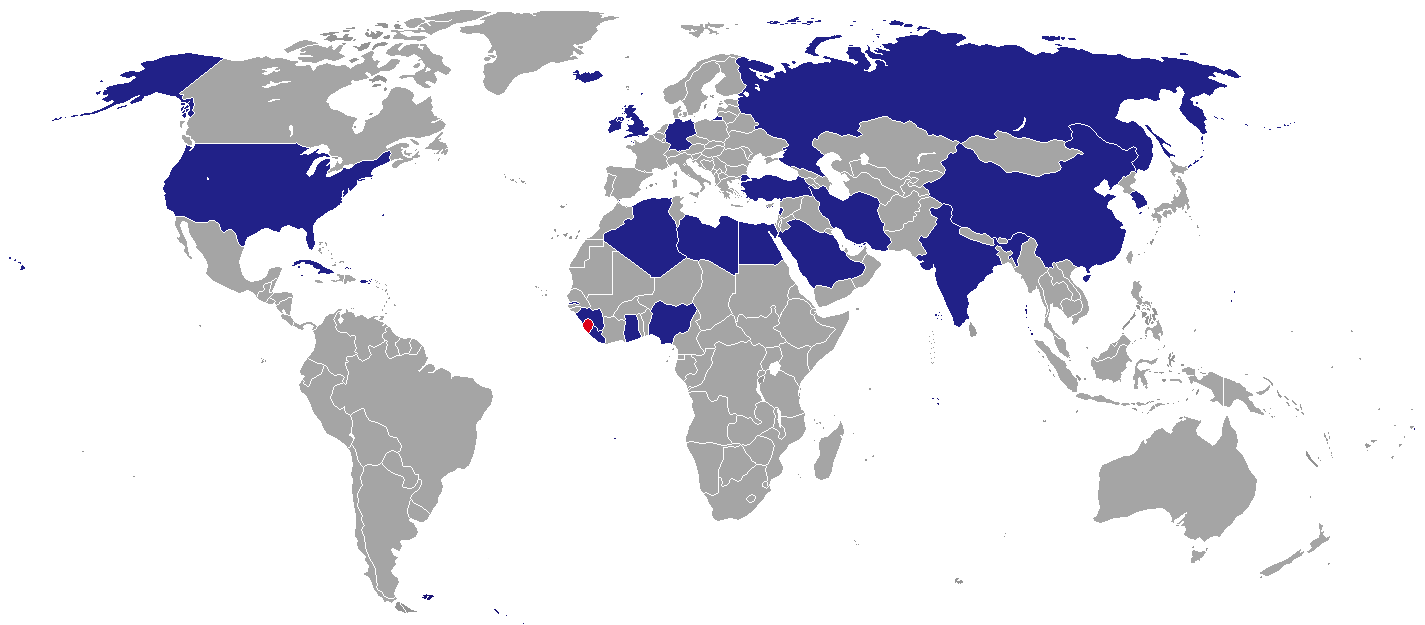
Map of diplomatic missions in Sierra Leone

== Embassies/High Commissions in Freetown ==
Entries marked with an asterisk (*) are member-states of the Commonwealth of Nations. As such, their embassies are formally termed as "high commissions".

1. Algeria
2. Bangladesh
3. China
4. Cuba
5. Egypt
6. Gambia*
7. Germany
8. Ghana*
9. Guinea
10. Iceland
11. India*
12. Iran
13. Ireland
14. Lebanon
15. Liberia
16. Libya
17. Nigeria*
18. Russia
19. Saudi Arabia
20. South Korea
21. Turkey
22. United Kingdom*
23. United States

== Other missions in Freetown ==
- European Union (Delegation)

== Non-resident embassies/high commissions ==
Resident in Abidjan, Ivory Coast

- Belgium
- Central African Republic
- Cameroon
- Italy
- Norway
- South Africa
- Switzerland

Resident in Abuja, Nigeria

- Argentina
- Greece
- Jamaica
- Kenya
- Poland
- Philippines
- Romania
- Serbia
- Slovakia
- Tanzania
- Trinidad and Tobago
- Vietnam

Resident in Accra, Ghana

- Australia
- Brazil
- Canada
- Czechia
- Denmark
- Israel
- Japan
- Mexico
- Namibia
- Netherlands
- Zambia

Resident in Conakry, Guinea

- France
- Malaysia
- Mali
- Morocco
- Palestine
- United Arab Emirates

Resident in Dakar, Senegal

- Austria
- Indonesia
- Colombia
- Madagascar
- Portugal
- Spain
- Thailand
- Ukraine

Resident elsewhere

- Croatia (London)
- Haiti (London)
- Ivory Coast (Monrovia)
- Lesotho (Tripoli)
- Malawi (Addis Ababa)
- Maldives (London)
- Malta (Valletta)
- Oman (Rabat)
- Saint Lucia (London)
- Saint Vincent and the Grenadines (London)
- Seychelles (Addis Ababa)
- Sweden (Stockholm)

== Missions to open ==
- Brazil (Embassy)
