= Sierra Leone–United States relations =

- Sierra Leone: United States

Sierra Leone–United States relations are bilateral relations between Sierra Leone and the United States.

== Pre-independence ==
United States-Sierra Leone relations date back at least to 1748 when the London firm of Grant, Sargent, and Oswald rebuilt the abandoned trading fort at Bunce Island and focused on supplying slaves to Charleston, South Carolina where local rice planters paid a premium for slaves from Sierra Leone and the neighboring areas in West Africa's Rice Coast because of their specialized knowledge and skill in rice cultivation.

Richard Oswald was the principal partner in the firm Grant, Sargent, and Oswald. Henry Laurens had established a close personal and business relationship with Oswald when he was sent to Great Britain to learn business with the Oswald family trading firm. Every year Oswald's agents at Bunce island dispatched to Charleston several ships carrying 250 to 350 slaves. Laurens advertised the slaves and sold them at auction to local rice planters, earning a ten percent commission. He used his earnings to purchase Carolina rice which he sent to Oswald in London, often in the same ship that brought the slaves from Bunce Island. The slave and rice trading connection between Oswald and Laurens—between Sierra Leone and South Carolina—made both men wealthy, propelled both into politics, and eventually affected the course of American history. Oswald advised Prime Minister Lord North on trade regulations and the best way to respond to the Rebellion in America". Meanwhile, Laurens served as President of the Second Continental Congress and was later dispatched to The Hague to negotiate a treaty for Dutch support. The British Navy captured Laurens and he was charged with high treason and imprisoned in the Tower of London until Oswald posted bail for his American business partner.

Jealous of the commercial success of Bunce Island, in 1779 the French took the opportunity of their alliance with the American revolutionaries to attack and destroy the slave trading fort. Thus, a battle of the American Revolution was actually fought in Sierra Leone.

In 1782 the Continental Congress appointed Laurens as one of the four American Peace Commissioners (along with John Adams, Benjamin Franklin, and John Jay) who would negotiate United States independence and the formal end to the war under the Treaty of Paris. Prime Minister Lord Shelburne appointed Oswald to lead the British plenipotentiaries. Thus, the independence of the United States was negotiated, at least in part, between British and American partners in the trade of slaves from Sierra Leone to South Carolina.

In 1858 the United States formally opened a Consulate in Freetown headed by Commercial Agent John E. Taylor who had previously been informally appointed as acting consul as early as 1853 by Commodore Issac Mayo of the USS Constitution. The Consulate was charged with protecting American citizens and promoting U.S. commercial interests, with the assistance—if necessary—of U.S. naval vessels of the Africa Squadron. Freetown became responsible for all of West Africa outside Liberia as posts at Goree-Dakar, Bathurst, St. Louis, and Bissau were closed. When the triple city of Dakar (with Goree and Rufisque) became the headquarters of the Government General of French West Africa, responsibility for West Africa was moved there and the Freetown consulate was closed on March 30, 1915.

In 1862 Timothy R. Hibbard and Charles V. Dyer were appointed Arbitrator and Judge, respectively, of the Anglo-American Mixed Court for the Suppression of the Slave Trade in Sierra Leone at Freetown established by the Lyons–Seward Treaty of 1862 to adjudicate allegations of illegal slave trading and condemn slaving ships. Because the Atlantic slave trade declined in the 1860s, the Anglo-American courts were never called upon to decide a case. Hibbard and Dyer however took up a broader intervention proposing a treaty system with African nations that in the cause of suppressing the slave trade, that would expand American trade in West Africa, introduce American military protection to the interior of the continent, and “civilize” the people there through agricultural reform.

== Post-Independence ==
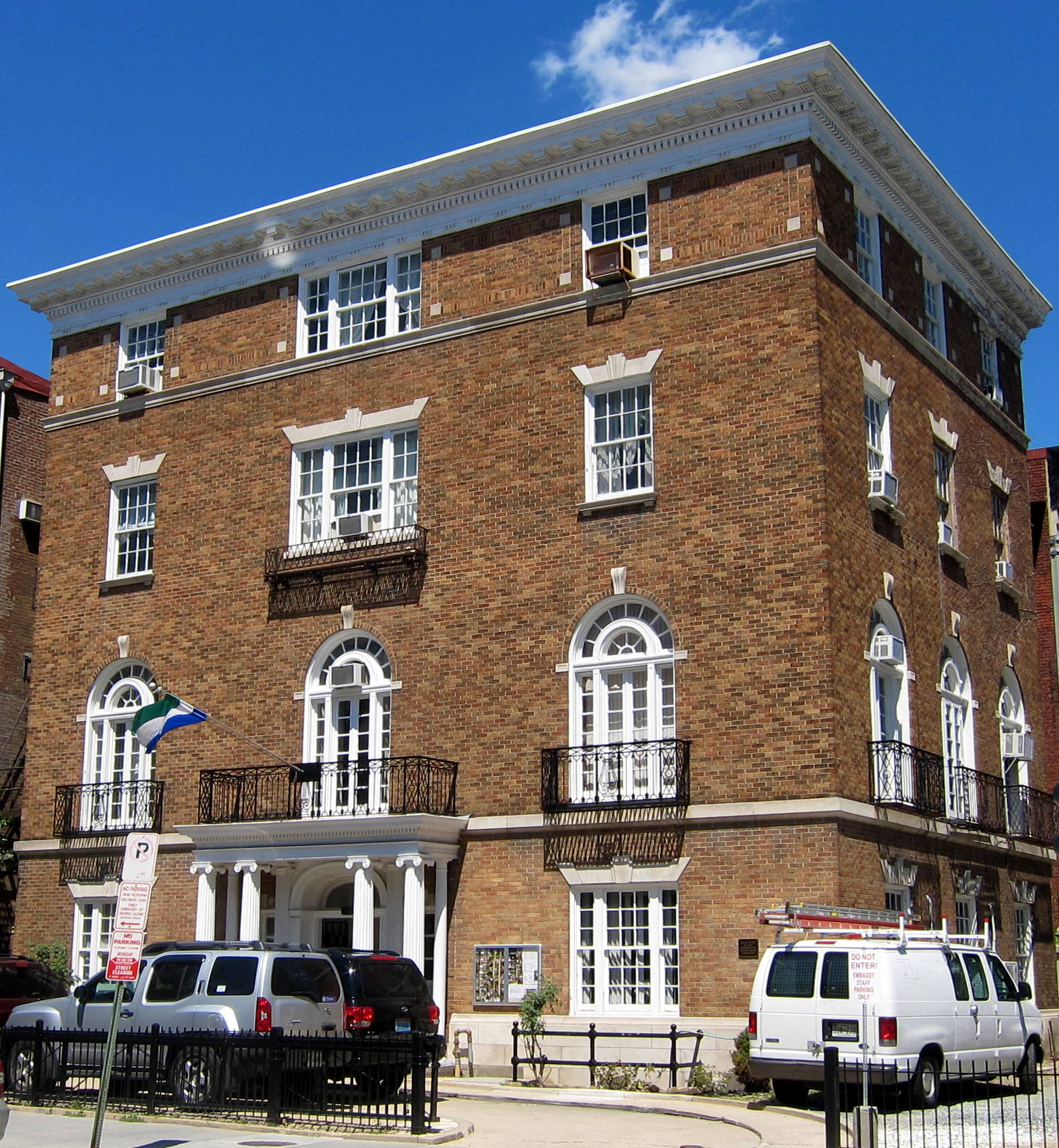
Embassy of Sierra Leone in Washington, D.C.

In 1959, the United States reopened the consulate in Freetown and elevated it to embassy status when Sierra Leone became independent in 1961. U.S.-Sierra Leone relations today are cordial, with ethnic ties between groups in the two countries receiving increasing historical interest. Many thousands of Sierra Leoneans reside in the United States. The United States recognized Sierra Leone's independence from the United Kingdom on April 27, 1961. Diplomatic relations were initiated on the same day, with the elevation of the existing American Consulate General in Freetown to Embassy status. Herbert Reiner Jr. served as the Chargé d'Affaires ad interim.

The U.S. engagement in Sierra Leone has been intertwined with efforts to foster peace, particularly during the Sierra Leone Civil War from 1991 to 2002. The United States has been actively involved in international endeavors to halt the civil war and prevent the illicit trade of diamonds originating from Sierra Leone.

The outbreak of the Ebola epidemic in May 2014 overwhelmed the country's medical infrastructure until containment was declared in November 2015. The Sierra Leonean government initiated a comprehensive recovery plan, with considerable international support, including from the United States. In 2023, the U.S. announced a $450,000 grant to preserve an old Fourah Bay College building.

In fiscal year 2006, total U.S. bilateral aid to Sierra Leone in all categories was $29.538 million. U.S. assistance focused on the consolidation of peace, democracy and human rights, health education, particularly combating HIV/AIDS, and human resources development.

As of September 2023, the United States Ambassador to Sierra Leone is Bryan David Hunt. Sierra Leone's Ambassador to the United States is H. E. Bockari Kortu Stevens and the Sierra Leone embassy is located in Washington.

== See also ==
- Foreign relations of Sierra Leone
- Foreign relations of the United States
