= Sulaiman Tejan-Jalloh =

Sierra Leonean politician

Sulaiman Tejan-Jalloh is a Sierra Leonean politician and ambassador.

- From 1996 to 1997 under President Ahmed Tejan Kabbah's government-in-exile during the Sierra Leone Civil War, he served as Minister of Transport and Communications.
- From April 9, 2000 to 2003, Tejan-Jalloh was Sierra Leone's High Commissioner to the United Kingdom.
- On November 13, 2006 he was appointed ambassador to Washington, D.C. where he was accredited on December 8, 2006.
