= Andrew Kanu =

Sierra Leonean politician

Alhaji Andrew Kanu is a Sierra Leonean politician from Makeni, Bombali District. Kanu is the mayor of Makeni and he is a member of the ruling All People's Congress (APC).
