= Karina, Sierra Leone =

- Location in Sierra Leone
- Coordinates: 9°09′N 11°58′W
- Country: Sierra Leone
- Province: Northern Province
- District: Bombali District
- Chiefdom: Biriwa Chiefdom
- Time zone: UTC-5 (GMT)

Karina is a town in Biriwa Chiefdom, Bombali District in the Northern province of Sierra Leone. The town lies approximately twenty eight miles from the main northern commercial city of Makeni. The major industry in the town is farming.

The Mandingo people make up the vast majority of the population of Karina. The population of Karina is almost entirely Muslim and the people of Karina are well known for their deeply religious Muslim faith.
