= Binkolo =

- Location in Sierra Leone
- Coordinates: 8°57′N 11°59′W
- Country: Sierra Leone
- Province: Northern Province
- District: Bombali District
- Chiefdom: Safroko Limba

Population (2004)
  - Total: 13,867

Binkolo is a rural town in Bombali District in the Northern Province of Sierra Leone. Binkolo is home to an estimated 13,867 residents (2004 census). The majority of the population are from the Limba ethnic group. The town is the birthplace of Sierra Leone's second President, Joseph Saidu Momoh.
