= Hunduwa =

- Country: Sierra Leone
- Province: Northern Province
- District: Bombali District
- Chiefdom: Magbaiamba Ndowahun
- Time zone: UTC±00:00 (GMT)

Hunduwa is a small town in the Bombali District in the Northern Province of Sierra Leone.
