= Safroko Limba Chiefdom =

Coordinates: 8°59′N 11°56′W

Safroko Limba
- Chiefdom
- Interactive map of Safroko Limba
- Country: Sierra Leone
- Province: Northern Province
- District: Bombali District
- Capital: Binkolo

Population (2015)
  - Total: 31,256
- Time zone: UTC±00:00 (GMT)

Safroko Limba is a chiefdom of Bombali District in the Northern Province of Sierra Leone. The principal town lies at Binkolo.

As of 2015, the chiefdom has a population of 31,256.
