= Kamabai =

- Location in Sierra Leone
- Coordinates: 9°09′N 11°58′W
- Country: Sierra Leone
- Province: Northern Province
- District: Bombali District
- Chiefdom: Biriwa Chiefdom
- Time zone: UTC-5 (GMT)

Kamabai is a small town in Bombali District in the Northern Province of Sierra Leone, with a population of about 4000 within a 7-kilometre (4.3 mi) radius (including the villages of Kagbumbo, Bonaia, Manlokoko, Kawere, Masasa, Makombon, Matunko, Mateli, Mabunko, Karim, Mankorokoro, Kamaron and Katanta). The town is about 41 kilometres (25 mi) northeast of Makeni. The town has several secondary schools, including the Kamabai secondary school, which is one of the largest secondary schools in Northern Sierra Leone, a government hospital and a nightclub.

The town is largely populated by the Limba people who are descendants from the Biriwa Heritage. Other significant minority ethnic groups in the town include the Mandingo, Fula and Temne. The Limba language along with the Krio language are widely spoken.

Kamabai is the birthplace of Almamy Suluku, who was one of Sierra Leone's most powerful rulers during the colonial era. The town is also the birthplace of Sierra Leone President Ernest Bai Koroma's mother, Alice Evelyn Sesay, who was married by a Koroma in Makeni. She was brought-up successfully in Kamabai town and then moved to Makeni where she gave birth to the future-president.
