= Biriwa Chiefdom =

Coordinates: 9°16′N 11°55′W

- Chiefdom
- Interactive map of Biriwa Chiefdom
- Country: Sierra Leone
- Province: Northern Province
- District: Bombali District
- Capital: Kamabai
- Time zone: UTC+0 (GMT)

Biriwa Chiefdom is a chiefdom in Bombali District of Sierra Leone. Its capital is Kamabai.
