= Bombali District =

- Location of Bombali District in Sierra Leone
- Coordinates: 9°20′N 12°15′W
- Country: Sierra Leone
- Province: Northern Province
- Capital: Makeni
- Largest city: Makeni

Government
  - Type: District Council
  - District Council Chairman: Dr. Mohamed Mark Babah Sisay (APC)
  - Deputy District Council Chairman: John Yamba Kanu (APC)

Area
  - Total: 3,876 km^{2} (1,497 sq mi)

Population (2021 census)
  - Total: 387,236
  - Density: 99.91/km^{2} (258.8/sq mi)
- Time zone: UTC-5 (Greenwich Mean Time)
- HDI (2017): 0.453 low · 3rd

Bombali is a district in the Northern Province of Sierra Leone. Its capital and largest city is Makeni, which is also the largest city in the north. The Bombali district is one of the sixteen districts of Sierra Leone. Bombali is one of the largest districts in Sierra Leone by geographical area, after Koinadugu District, and is the second most populous district in the Northern part of Sierra Leone, after Port Loko district. In the 2015 Sierra Leone national census, the population of Bombali District was 387,236. Other major towns in Bombali District include Kamabai, Karina and Binkolo.

The District of Bombali occupies a total area of 3,876 km^{2} (1,497 sq mi) and comprises thirteen chiefdoms. The district borders Karene District to the north, Port Loko District, Tonkolili District to the south, and Koinadugu District to the east.

The population of Bombali District is ethnically diverse, although the Temne and Limba form the largest ethnic groups. The population of Bombali District is predominantly Muslim, though with a large Christian minority.

Bombali District is the birthplace and home district of the former president of Sierra Leone, Ernest Bai Koroma, who was born and raised in the city of Makeni. The district is also the birthplace and home district of former president of Sierra Leone Joseph Saidu Momoh, who was born in the town of Binkolo.

The University of Makeni and St. Francis Secondary school are based in Bombali District's largest city, Makeni.

== Government and politics ==
Bombali district is governed with a directly elected district council form of government, which is headed by a district council chairman, who is the highest local government official in the district. The chairman is responsible for the general management of the district. The current chairman is Dr. Mohamed Mark Babah Sisay of the All People's Congress (APC), following his victory in the 2023 Sierra Leone general elections.

Bombali District is a political stronghold of the APC, the current ruling party in Sierra Leone; and one of the two major political parties in the country. Currently the APC holds all elected seats from Bombali District to the Parliament of Sierra Leone. The APC also controls the Bombali District Council local government and the Makeni city council. Two of the three Sierra Leone presidents from the APC party Joseph Saidu Momoh and Ernest Bai Koroma are natives of Bombali District.

The APC has always been overwhelmingly popular in almost all parts of Bombali District since the party was founded; with the exception of the predominantly ethnic Mandingo town of Karina and its surrounding villages, located in part of Biriwa Chiefdom, which have traditionally supported the Sierra Leone People's Party (SLPP), particularly under the government of president Ahmad Tejan Kabbah, who was overwhelmingly popular in Karina and its surrounding villages during his presidency.

== Members of Parliament ==
The District of Bombali has eight Representatives in the Sierra Leonean Parliament, of which seven members were elected for a five-year term. The district is a stronghold of the former ruling government of the APC party. In the second round of the 2007 Sierra Leone presidential election, the incumbent vice president of Sierra Leone Solomon Berewa and candidate of the then ruling SLPP got 11 percent of the vote in Bombali District, while the leader of the main opposition party and current president of Sierra Leone Ernest Bai Koroma of the All People's Congress (APC) got 89 percent in the second round in the district.

== Administrative divisions ==
=== Chiefdoms ===
==== Pre-2017 ====
Prior to the 2017 local administrative reorganization, Bombali District was made up of thirteen chiefdoms as the third level of administrative subdivision.

1. Biriwa – Kamabai
2. Bombali Shebora – Makeni
3. Gbanti Kamaranka – Kamaranka
4. Gbendembu Ngowahun – Kalangba
5. Libeisaygahun – Batkanu
6. Magbaiamba Ndowahun – Hunduwa
7. Makari Gbanti – Masongbon
8. Paki Massabong – Mapaki
9. Safroko Limba – Binkolo
10. Sanda Loko – Kamalo
11. Sanda Tenraren – Mateboi
12. Sella Limba – Kamakwie
13. Tambakha – Fintonia

==== Post-2017 ====
After the 2017 local administrative reorganization, Bombali District has made up of thirteen chiefdoms as the third level of administrative subdivision.

1. Biriwa – Kamabai
2. Bombali Shebora – ?
3. Bombali Siari (Note: Formerly part of Bombali Shebora Chiefdom.) – ?
4. Gbanti (Note: Formerly part of Makari Gbanti Chiefdom; split off.) – ?
5. Gbendembu (Note: Formerly part of Gbendembu Ngowahun Chiefdom; split off.) – ?
6. Kamaranka (Note: Formerly part of Gbanti Kamaranka Chiefdom; split off, with Gbanti Chiefdom moving to Karene District.) – Kamaranka
7. Magbaiamba Ndowahun – Hunduwa
8. Makari – Masongbon
9. Mara (Note: Formerly part of Malal Mara Chiefdom; moved from Tonkolili District.) – ?
10. Ngowahun – Kalangba
11. Paki Massabong – Mapaki
12. Safroko Limba – Binkolo
13. Makeni City – Makeni

=== Major towns ===
- Makeni, largest city
- Kamakwie
- Kamabai
- Karina
- Binkolo

=== Towns and villages ===
- Masongbon
- Kagber
- Kalangba
- Kangbori
- Fintonia
- Lowoma
- Hunduwa
- Kamaranka
- Batkanu
- Mateboi
- Gbendembu
- Tambiama
- Masingbi
- Mapaki
- Moriba
- Rokulan
- Kamalo
- Sanda
- Tonko

== Effects of the civil war ==
Bombali was a principal former rebel stronghold and experienced considerable displacement, destruction and trauma as a result of the conflict. While progress has been made since the conflict, particularly in restoration of state authority, the level of social services and economic recovery remains unsatisfactory throughout the district. The provincial importance of Makeni is in contrast with the current lack of water and power supply in the township, and the bad road network and large distances in the district have meant that limited intervention has been made in chiefdoms outside of the Makeni area, particularly in the far north.

== Health ==
Medical services are provided by a mix of government, private and non-governmental organizations (NGOs). The Ministry of Health and Sanitation (MOHS) shifted to a decentralized health system structure after the end of the civil in war in 2002, in an effort to increase coverage. Bombali has 16 community health centers (CHC), 18 community health posts (CHP), 48 maternal child health posts (MCHP), 1 government hospital, 1 military hospital, 1 community hospital, 3 mission Clinics, 3 mission hospitals and 3 private clinics. Traditional medicine forms part of the primary health care system in Sierra Leone. Diseases endemic to Bombali are Yellow Fever and Malaria. Holy Spirit Hospital (Makeni), largest private hospital in the Northern Province of Sierra Leone, is located in Bombali District in the town of Makeni.

In 2019, the First Responder Coalition of Sierra Leone (FRCSL) was created in Makeni, the largest city of Bombali District. The five founding members included the Sierra Leone Red Cross Society, LFR International, the University of Makeni, Agency for Rural Community Transformation, and Holy Spirit Hospital. 1,000 community members from Bombali were trained to be first responders by the Coalition and equipped with first aid kits between June and July 2019.

== Religion ==
Religion in Bombali District (2015)
Religion	Percent(%)
Islam	71.4%
Christianity	26.9%
Baháʼí Faith	0.0%
Traditional African religion	0.0%
Other	1.2%
No religion	0.4%

== Notable people ==
- Ernest Bai Koroma, President of Sierra Leone from 2007 to 2018
- Joseph Saidu Momoh, President of Sierra Leone from 1985 to 1992
- Almamy Suluku, was a powerful Limba ruler who maintained his independence as long as possible through brilliant political strategy during colonial era.
- Edward Turay, Politician
- Brima Koroma, football star

== See also ==
- Sierra Leone
- Sierra Leone Civil War

== Sources ==
- Parts of this article reproduced with permission from
- https://web.archive.org/web/20070121122533/http://www.statehouse-sl.org/member-parliament.html
