= Tambiama =

- Interactive map of Tambiama
- Coordinates: 8.199311°N 12.058972°W
- Country: Sierra Leone
- Province: Eastern Province
- District: Kailahun District
- Chiefdom: Kissi Teng Chiefdom
- Time zone: UTC+0 (GMT)

Tambiama is a town in the Kailahun District of the Eastern Province in Sierra Leone.
