= Sierra Leone =

Country in West Africa

Republic of Sierra Leone
- Flag Coat of arms
- Motto: "Unity, Freedom, Justice"
- Anthem: "High We Exalt Thee, Realm of the Free"
- Capital and largest city: Freetown; 08°30′00″N 12°06′00″W
- Official languages: English
- Recognised national languages: Krio
- Ethnic groups (2015): 35.5% Temne; 33.2% Mende; 6.4% Limba; 4.4% Kono; 3.4% Fula; 2.9% Susu; 2.9% Loko; 2.8% Koranko; 2.6% Sherbro; 2.4% Mandingo; 1.3% Krio
- Religion (2020): 78% Islam; 21% Christianity; 1% other
- Demonym: Sierra Leonean
- Government: Unitary presidential republic
  - President: Julius Maada Bio
  - Vice-President: Mohamed Juldeh Jalloh
  - Chief Minister: David Moinina Sengeh
  - Speaker of Parliament: Segepoh Solomon Thomas
  - Chief Justice: Osman Abdulai Turay
- Legislature: Parliament

Independence from the United Kingdom
  - Dominion: 27 April 1961
  - Republic: 19 April 1971

Area
  - Total: 73,252 km^{2} (28,283 sq mi) (117th)
  - Water (%): 1.1

Population
  - 2023 estimate: ▲8,460,512 (100th)
  - Density: 124/km^{2} (321.2/sq mi) (114th)
- GDP (PPP): 2025 estimate
  - Total: ▲$32.510 billion (150th)
  - Per capita: ▲$3,550 (165th)
- GDP (nominal): 2025 estimate
  - Total: ▲$8.390 billion (154th)
  - Per capita: ▲$915 (176th)
- Gini (2024): 33.7 medium inequality
- HDI (2023): ▲0.467 low (185th)
- Currency: Leone (SLE)
- Time zone: UTC±00:00 (GMT)
- Calling code: +232
- ISO 3166 code: SL
- Internet TLD: .sl
- 1. Rank based on 2007 figure

Sierra Leone, (Note: /siˌɛrə liˈoʊn(i)/, also UK: /siˌɛərə -/, US: /ˌsɪərə -/; Krio: Salon or Salone) officially the Republic of Sierra Leone, is a country on the west coast of West Africa. It is bordered to the southeast by Liberia and to the north by Guinea. Sierra Leone's land area is 73,252 km^{2} (28,283 sq mi). It has a tropical climate and environments ranging from savannahs to rainforests. As of the 2023 census, Sierra Leone had a population of 8,460,512. Freetown is its capital and largest city.

Sierra Leone is a presidential republic, with a unicameral parliament and a directly elected president. It is a secular state. Its constitution provides for the separation of state and religion and freedom of conscience. Muslims constitute three-quarters of the population, and there is a significant Christian minority. Religious tolerance is very high.

Sierra Leone's current territorial configuration was established in two phases: in 1808, the coastal Sierra Leone Colony was founded as part of the British Empire, to be a place to resettle returning Africans after the abolition of the slave trade; then in 1896, the inland Protectorate was created as a result of the Berlin Conference of 1884–1885. This led to the formal recognition of the territory as the Sierra Leone Colony and Protectorate. Sierra Leone attained independence from the United Kingdom in 1961 under the leadership of Prime Minister Sir Milton Margai of the Sierra Leone People's Party (SLPP). In 1971, under Prime Minister Siaka Stevens of the All People's Congress (APC), the country adopted a new constitution, transforming Sierra Leone into a presidential republic, with Stevens as the inaugural president.

In 1978, Stevens declared the APC to be the sole legally recognised party. In 1985, he was succeeded by Joseph Saidu Momoh. Momoh's enactment of a new constitution in 1991 reintroduced a multi-party system. That same year, a protracted civil war broke out between the government and the Revolutionary United Front (RUF) rebel group. The conflict, characterised by multiple coups d'état, persisted for 11 years. Intervention by ECOMOG forces and later by the United Kingdom resulted in the defeat of the RUF in 2002, ushering in a period of relative stability.

Sierra Leone is a culturally diverse country, home to approximately 18 ethnic groups, with the Temne and Mende peoples being predominant. The Creole people, descendants of freed African-American, Afro-Caribbean slaves and liberated Africans, constitute about 1.2% of the population. English is the official language, while Krio is the lingua franca, spoken by 97% of the population. The country is rich with natural resources, notably diamonds, gold, bauxite and aluminium. As of the most recent survey in 2019, 59.2% of the population is affected by multidimensional poverty and an additional 21.3% vulnerable to it. Sierra Leone maintains membership in several international organisations, including the United Nations, African Union, Economic Community of West African States (ECOWAS), and the Commonwealth of Nations, among others.

== Etymology ==
Sierra Leone derives its name from the Lion Mountains near its capital, Freetown. Originally named Serra Leoa (Portuguese for 'lioness mountains') by Portuguese explorer Pedro de Sintra in 1462, the modern name is based on the Venetian spelling, which was introduced by Venetian explorer Alvise Cadamosto and subsequently adopted by other European mapmakers.

== History ==
=== Early history ===
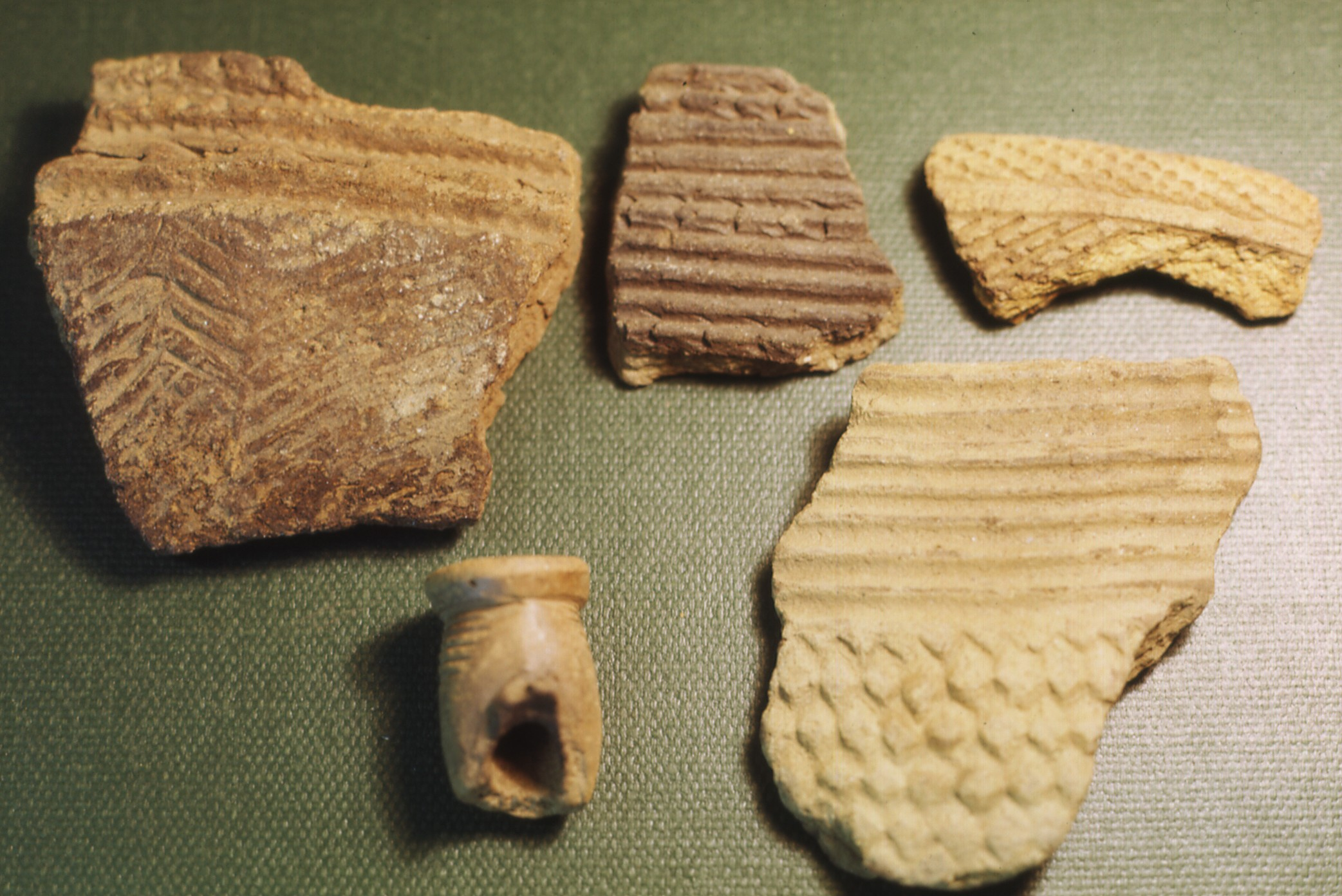
Fragments of prehistoric pottery from Kamabai Rock Shelter

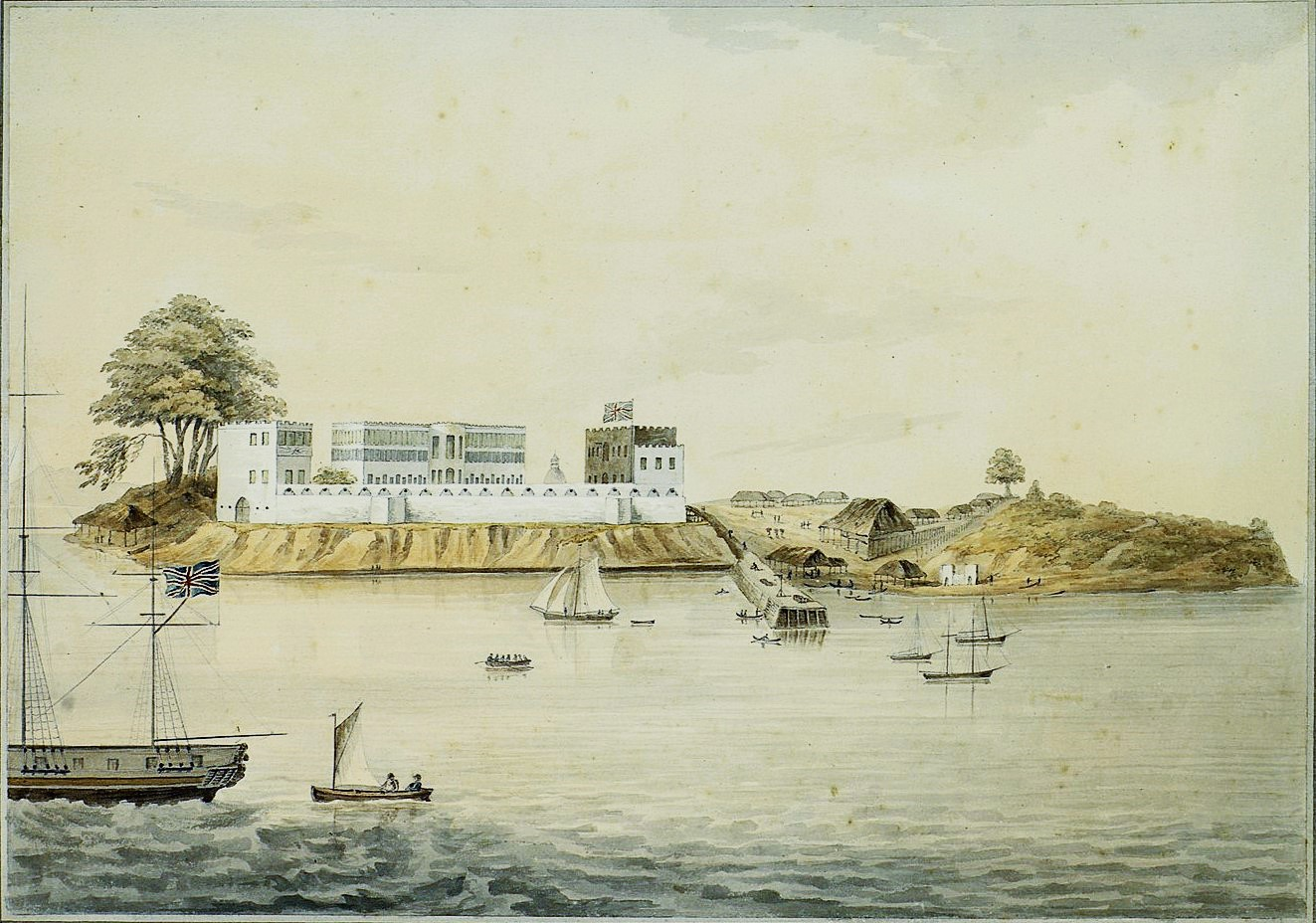
Bunce Island, 1805, during the period the slave facility was run by John and Alexander Anderson

Sierra Leone's history is marked by continuous human habitation for at least 2,500 years, influenced by migrations from across Africa. Iron technology had been adopted by the 9th century and agriculture established by 1000 AD along the coast. Climate shifts over centuries altered the ecological zones, influencing migration and conquest dynamics.

The region's dense tropical rainforest and swamps, coupled with the presence of the tsetse fly which carried a disease fatal to horses and the zebu cattle used by the Mandé people, provided natural defences against invasions by the Mandinka Empire and other African empires, and limited influence by the Mali Empire. The introduction of Islam by Susu traders, merchants and migrants in the 18th century further enriched the culture, eventually establishing a strong foothold in the north. The conquest by Samory Touré in the northeast solidified Islam among the Yalunka, Kuranko and Limba people.

=== European trading ===
The 15th century marked the beginning of European interaction with Sierra Leone, highlighted by Portuguese explorer Pedro de Sintra mapping the region in 1462 and naming it after the lioness mountains. This naming has been subject to historical reinterpretation, suggesting earlier European knowledge of the region. Following Sintra, European traders established fortified posts, engaging primarily in the slave trade, which shaped the socio-economic landscape significantly.

Traders from European countries such as the Dutch Republic, England and France, started to establish trading stations. These stations quickly began to primarily deal in slaves, who were brought to the coast by indigenous traders from interior areas. The Europeans made payments, called Cole, for rent, tribute, and trading rights, to the king of an area. Local Afro-European merchants often acted as middlemen, the Europeans advancing them goods to trade to indigenous merchants, most often for slaves and ivory.

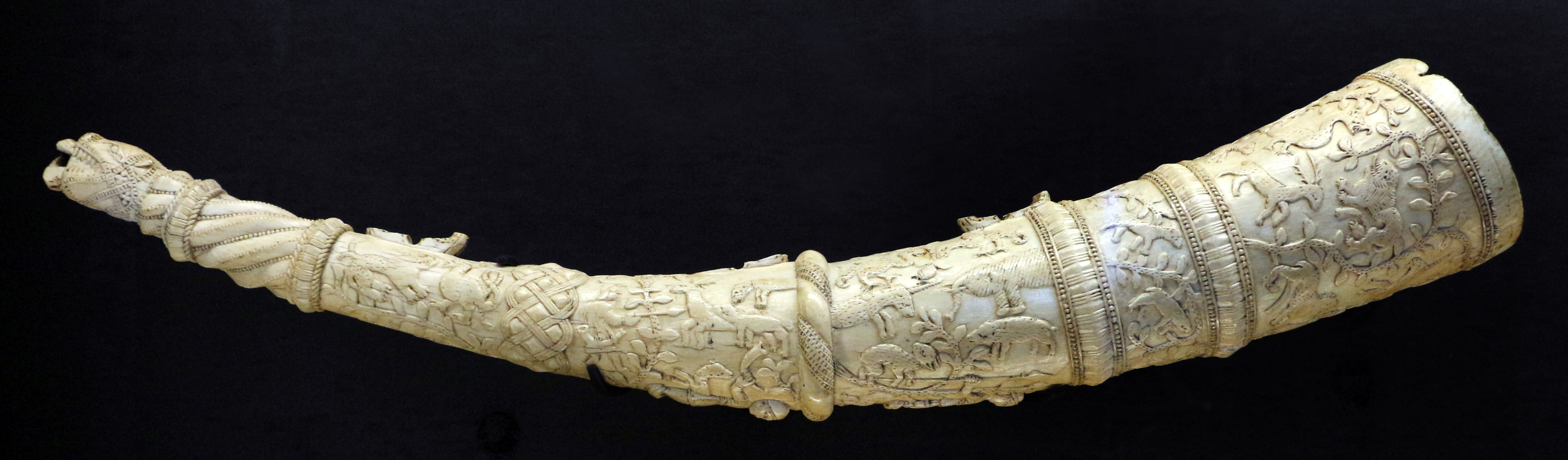
Sierra leone, sapi, olifante, c. 1490-1510

=== Early Portuguese interactions ===
Portuguese traders were particularly drawn to the local craftsmanship in ivory, leading to a notable trade in ivory artefacts such as horns, Sapi Saltceller, and spoons. The Sapi people belonged to a cluster of people who spoke West Atlantic languages, living in the region of modern day Sierra Leone. There had already been a carving culture established in the area prior to Portuguese contact, and many travellers to Sierra Leone were initially impressed with the Sapis' carving skills, taking local ivory horns back to Europe.

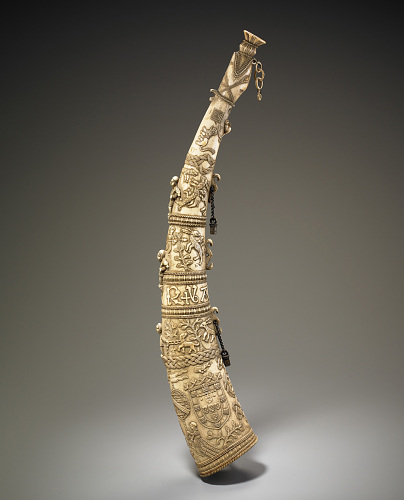
An Ivory Hunting Horn, Sapi people, Modern day Bullom or Temne People, Sierra Leone, late 15th century

=== Black Poor of London ===
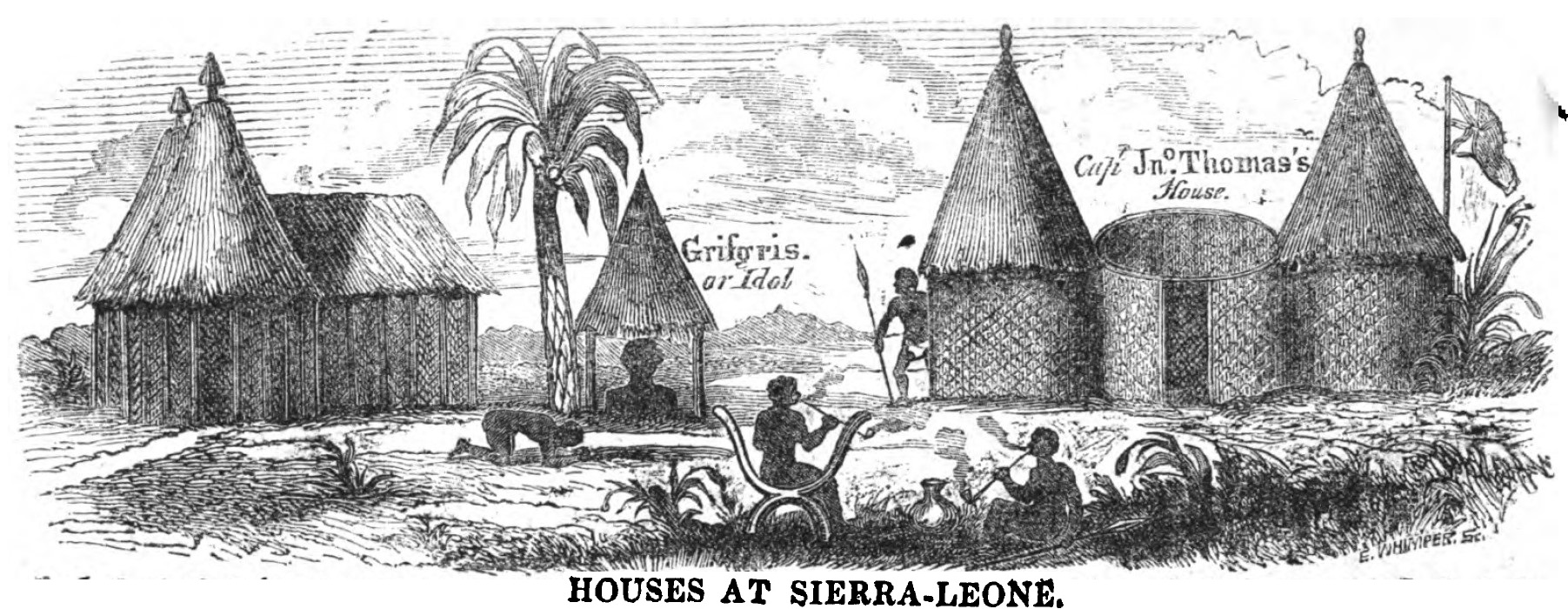
Houses at Sierra-Leone (May 1853, X, p. 55)

In the late 18th century, some African Americans who had fought for the British Crown during the American Revolutionary War were resettled in Sierra Leone, forming a community named Black Loyalists. This resettlement scheme was partly motivated by social issues in London, with the Sierra Leone Resettlement Scheme offering a new beginning for the Black Poor. Many had been slaves who had escaped to join the British, lured by promises of freedom (emancipation). Official documentation known as the Book of Negroes lists thousands of freed slaves whom the British evacuated from the nascent United States and resettled in colonies elsewhere in British North America. Pro-slavery advocates accused the Black Poor of being responsible for a large proportion of crime in 18th-century London. While the broader community included some women, the Black Poor seems to have exclusively consisted of men, some of whom developed relationships with local women and often married them. On the voyage between Plymouth, England and Sierra Leone, 29 European girlfriends and wives accompanied the Black Poor settlers. Many in London thought moving them to Sierra Leone would lift them out of poverty. The Sierra Leone Resettlement Scheme was proposed by entomologist Henry Smeathman and drew interest from humanitarians like Granville Sharp, who saw it as a means of showing the pro-slavery lobby that black people could contribute towards the running of the new colony. Government officials soon became involved in the scheme as well, although their interest was spurred by the possibility of resettling a large group of poor citizens elsewhere. William Pitt the Younger, prime minister and leader of the Tory party, had an active interest in the scheme because he saw it as a means to repatriate the Black Poor to Africa.

In January 1787, the Atlantic and the Belisarius set sail for Sierra Leone, but bad weather forced them to divert to Plymouth, during which time about 50 passengers died. Another 24 were discharged, and 23 ran away. Eventually, 411 passengers sailed to Sierra Leone in April 1787. On the voyage between Plymouth and Sierra Leone, 96 passengers died. In 1787 the British Crown founded a settlement in Sierra Leone in what was called the "Province of Freedom". About 400 black and 60 white colonists reached Sierra Leone on 15 May 1787. After they established Granville Town, most of the first group of colonists died, owing to disease and warfare with the indigenous African peoples (Temne), who resisted their encroachment. When the ships left them in September, they had been reduced to "276 persons, namely 212 black men, 30 black women, 5 white men and 29 white women".

The settlers that remained forcibly captured land from a local African chieftain, but he retaliated, attacking the settlement, which was reduced to a mere 64 settlers comprising 39 black men, 19 black women, and six white women. Black settlers were captured by unscrupulous traders and sold as slaves, and the remaining colonists were forced to arm themselves for their own protection. The 64 remaining colonists established a second Granville Town.

=== Nova Scotians ===
Following the American Revolution, some Black Loyalists from Nova Scotia, Canada, were relocated to Sierra Leone, founding Freetown and contributing significantly to the Krio people and Krio language that came to define the region.

Following the American Revolution, more than 3,000 Black Loyalists had also been settled in Nova Scotia, but faced harsh winters and racial discrimination. Thomas Peters pressed British authorities for relief and more aid; together with British abolitionist John Clarkson, the Sierra Leone Company was established to relocate Black Loyalists who wanted to take their chances in West Africa. In 1792 nearly 1,200 people from Nova Scotia crossed the Atlantic to build the second (and only permanent) Colony of Sierra Leone and the settlement of Freetown on 11 March 1792. In Sierra Leone they were called the Nova Scotian Settlers, the Nova Scotians, or the Settlers. Clarkson initially banned the survivors of Granville Town from joining the new settlement, blaming them for the demise of Granville Town. The Settlers built Freetown in the styles they knew from their lives in the American South; they also continued American fashion and American manners. In addition, many continued to practise Methodism.

In the 1790s, the Settlers, including adult women, voted for the first time in elections. In 1792, in a move that foreshadowed the women's suffrage movements in Britain, the heads of all households, of which a third were women, were given the right to vote. Black settlers in Sierra Leone enjoyed much more autonomy than their white equivalent in European countries. Black migrants elected different levels of political representatives, 'tithingmen', who represented each dozen settlers and 'hundreders' who represented larger amounts. This sort of representation was not available in Nova Scotia. The initial process of society-building in Freetown was a harsh struggle. The Crown did not supply enough basic supplies and provisions and the Settlers were continually threatened by illegal slave trading and the risk of re-enslavement.

=== Jamaican Maroons and Liberated Africans ===
The Sierra Leone Company, controlled by London investors, refused to allow the settlers to take freehold of the land. In 1799 some of the settlers revolted. The Crown subdued the revolt by bringing in forces of more than 500 Jamaican Maroons, whom they transported from Cudjoe's Town (Trelawny Town) via Nova Scotia in 1800. Led by Colonel Montague James, the Maroons helped the colonial forces to put down the revolt, and in the process the Jamaican Maroons in Sierra Leone secured the best houses and farms.

On 1 January 1808, Thomas Ludlam, the Governor of the Sierra Leone Company and a leading abolitionist, surrendered the company's charter. This ended its 16 years of running the colony. The British Crown reorganised the Sierra Leone Company as the African Institution; it was directed to improve the local economy. Its members represented both British who hoped to inspire local entrepreneurs and those with interest in the Macauley & Babington Company, which held the (British) monopoly on Sierra Leone trade.

At about the same time (following the Slave Trade Act 1807 which abolished the slave trade), Royal Navy crews delivered thousands of formerly enslaved Africans to Freetown, after liberating them from illegal slave ships. These Liberated Africans or recaptives were sold for $20 a head as apprentices to the white settlers, Nova Scotian Settlers, and the Jamaican Maroons. Many Liberated Africans were treated poorly and even abused because some of the original settlers considered them their property. Cut off from their various homelands and traditions, the Liberated Africans were forced to assimilate to the Western styles of Settlers and Maroons. The Liberated Africans eventually modified their customs to adopt those of the Nova Scotians, Maroons and Europeans, yet kept some of their ethnic traditions. As the Liberated Africans became successful traders and spread Christianity throughout West Africa, they intermarried with the Nova Scotians and Maroons.

These Liberated Africans were from many areas of Africa, but principally the west coast. Between the 18th and 19th century, freed African Americans, some Americo Liberian "refugees", and particularly Afro-Caribbeans, mainly Jamaican Maroons, also immigrated and settled in Freetown. Together these peoples formed the Creole/Krio ethnicity and an English-based creole language (Krio), which is the lingua franca.

=== Colonial era (1808–1961) ===
The colonial era saw Sierra Leone evolving under British rule. Sierra Leone developed as an educational centre in West Africa, with the establishment of Fourah Bay College in 1827, attracting English-speaking Africans from across the region.

The settlement of Sierra Leone in the 1800s was unique in that the population was composed of displaced Africans, brought to the colony after the British abolition of the slave trade in 1807. Upon arrival in Sierra Leone, each recaptive was given a registration number, and information on their physical qualities was entered into the Register of Liberated Africans. Documentation was often subjective, resulting in inaccurate entries, making them difficult to track.

The first missionaries, Peter Hartwig and Melchior Renner from the Church Missionary Society (CMS), arrived in Sierra Leone in 1804. The CMS missionaries were to introduce Western ideals, including Western education and healthcare. One of their most significant contributions was the establishment of schools for West African children. European missionaries established these schools with an agenda to convert the native people to their religion, but the educational efforts did not relate to local needs.

In the early 19th century, Freetown served as the residence of the British colonial governor of the region, who also administered the Gold Coast (now Ghana) and the Gambia settlements. Sierra Leone developed as the educational centre of British West Africa. The British established Fourah Bay College in 1827, which became a magnet for English-speaking Africans on the West Coast. For more than a century, it was the only European-style university in west Sub-Saharan Africa. Samuel Ajayi Crowther was the first student to be enrolled. Fourah Bay College soon drew Creoles/Krio people and other Africans seeking higher education in British West Africa. These included Nigerians, Ghanaians, Ivorians, and others, especially in the fields of theology and education. Freetown was known as the "Athens of Africa" due to the number of excellent schools there and in surrounding areas.

In Freetown, the British interacted mostly with the Krio people, who did most of the trading with the indigenous peoples of the interior. Educated Krio people held many positions in the colonial government, giving them status and good pay. After the Berlin Conference of 1884–85, the British decided to establish more dominion over the inland areas, to satisfy what the European powers called "effective occupation". In 1896 it annexed these areas, declaring them the Sierra Leone Protectorate. With this change, the British began to expand their administration in the region, recruiting British citizens to posts and pushing Krio people out of governmental positions and even Freetown's desirable residential areas.

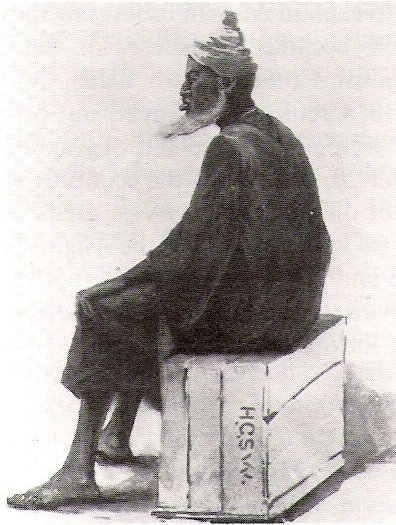
Bai Bureh, Temne leader of the Hut Tax War of 1898 against British rule

Madam Yoko persuaded the British to give her control of the Kpaa Mende chiefdom. She used diplomacy to communicate with local chiefs who did not trust her friendship with the British. Because Yoko supported the British, some sub-chiefs rebelled, causing Yoko to take refuge in the police barracks. She ruled as a paramount chief in the new British Protectorate until 1906.

The British annexation of the Protectorate interfered with indigenous chiefs' sovereignty. They designated chiefs as units of local government, rather than dealing with them individually, as had been the previous practice. They did not maintain relationships even with longstanding allies, such as Bai Bureh, who was later portrayed as a prime instigator of the Hut Tax War.

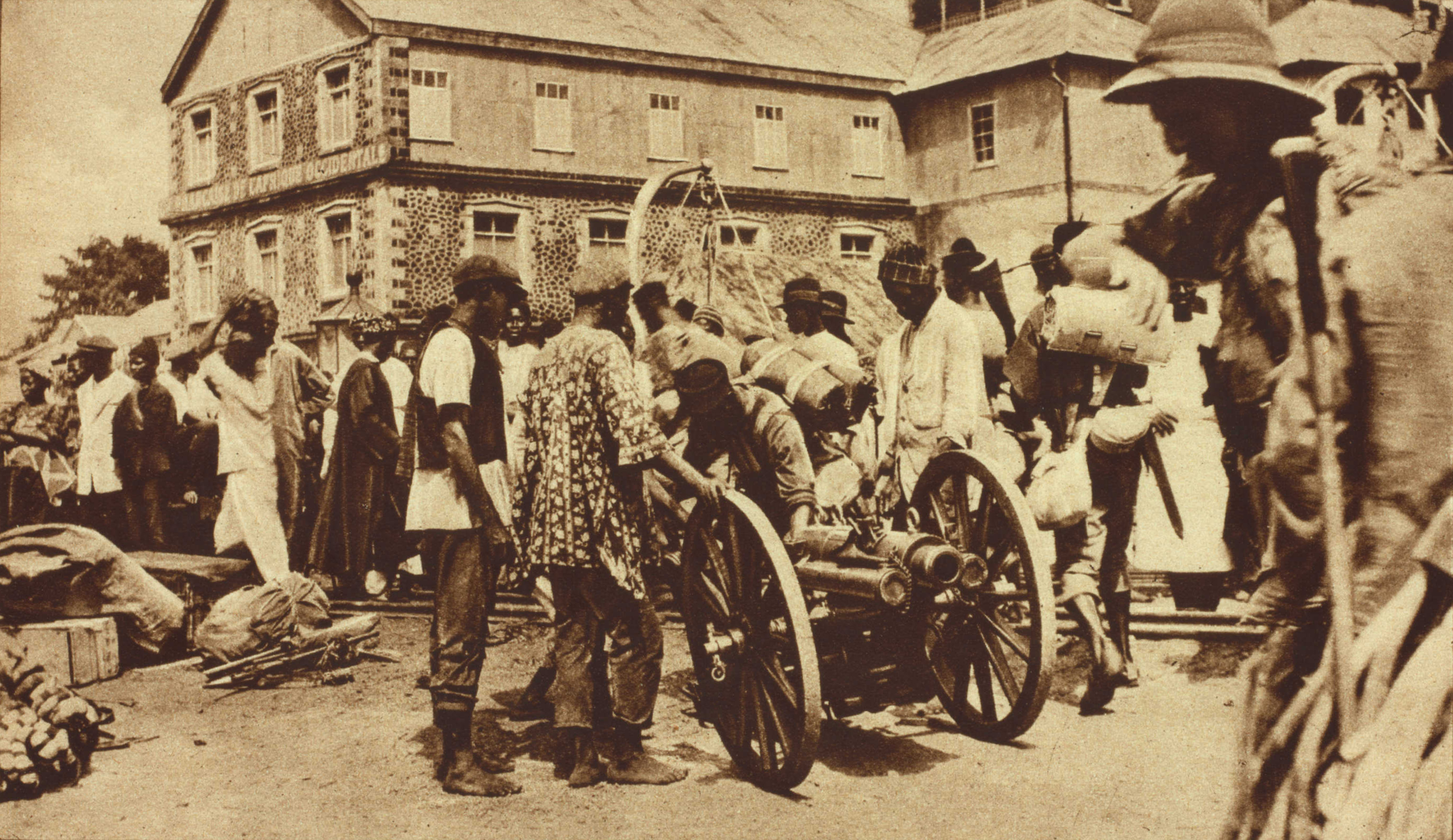
British West African Campaign troops in Freetown, 1914–1916. Published caption: "British expeditionary force preparing to embark at Freetown to attack the German Cameroons, the main object of the attack being the port of Duala. Auxiliary native troops were freely used in African warfare."

In 1898, Colonel Frederic Cardew, military governor of the Protectorate, imposed a new tax on dwellings and demanded that chiefs use their people to maintain roads. The taxes were often higher than the value of the dwellings, and 24 chiefs signed a petition to Cardew stating how destructive this was; their people could not afford to take time off from their subsistence agriculture. They resisted payment of taxes, and tension over the new colonial requirements and the administration's suspicion of the chiefs led to the Hut Tax War. The British fired first; the northern front of mainly Temne people was led by Bai Bureh. The southern front, consisting mostly of Mende people, entered the conflict somewhat later, for other reasons.

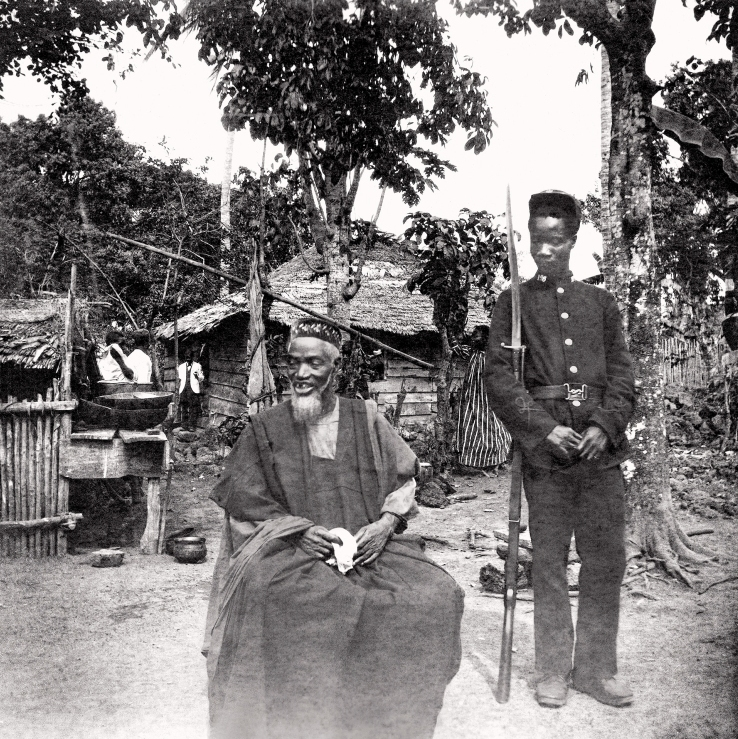
Temne leader Bai Bureh seen here in 1898 after his surrender, sitting relaxed in his traditional dress with a handkerchief in his hands, while a Sierra Leonean West African Frontier Force soldier stands guard next to him

For several months, Bureh's fighters had the advantage over the vastly more powerful British forces but both sides suffered hundreds of fatalities. Bureh surrendered on 11 November 1898 to end the destruction of his people's territory and dwellings. The British government recommended leniency, but Cardew insisted on sending the chief and two allies into exile in the Gold Coast; his government hanged 96 of the chief's warriors. Bureh was allowed to return in 1905, when he resumed his chieftaincy of Kasseh. The defeat of the Temne and Mende in the Hut Tax War ended mass resistance to the Protectorate and colonial government, but intermittent rioting and labour unrest continued throughout the colonial period. Riots in 1955 and 1956 involved tens of thousands of Sierra Leoneans in the Protectorate.

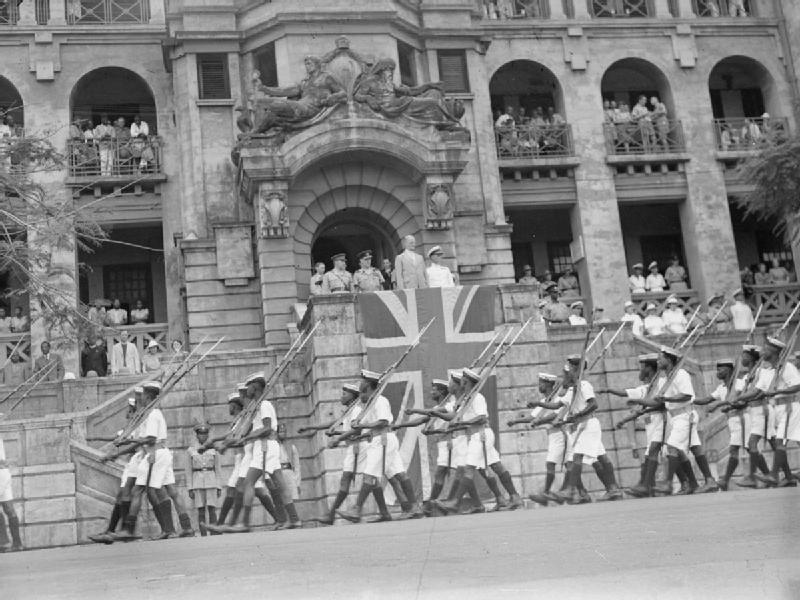
African Naval ratings march past the Governor of Sierra Leone, Sir Hubert Stevenson.

Domestic slavery, which continued to be practised by local African elites, was abolished in 1928. In 1935, a monopoly on mineral mining was granted to the Sierra Leone Selection Trust, run by De Beers. The monopoly was scheduled to last 98 years. Mining of diamonds in the east and other minerals expanded, drawing labourers there from other parts of the country.

In 1924, the UK government divided the administration of Sierra Leone into Colony and Protectorate, with different political systems for each. The Colony was Freetown and its coastal area; the Protectorate was defined as the hinterland areas dominated by local chiefs. Antagonism between the two entities escalated to a heated debate in 1947, when proposals were introduced to provide for a single political system for both the Colony and the Protectorate. Most proposals came from leaders of the Protectorate, whose population far outnumbered the Colony's. The Krios, led by Isaac Wallace-Johnson, opposed the proposals, as they would have reduced the Krios' political power in the Colony.

In 1951, Lamina Sankoh collaborated with educated Protectorate leaders to form the Sierra Leone People's Party (SLPP) as the party of the Protectorate. The SLPP leadership, led by Sir Milton Margai, negotiated with the British and the educated Krio-dominated colony based in Freetown to achieve independence. Under Margai, educated Protectorate elites were able to join forces with the paramount chiefs in the face of Krio intransigence. Later, Margai used the same skills to win over opposition leaders and moderate Krio elements to achieve independence from the UK.

In November 1951, Margai oversaw the drafting of a new constitution, which united the separate Colonial and Protectorate legislatures and provided a framework for decolonisation. In 1953, Sierra Leone was granted local ministerial powers and Margai was elected Chief Minister of Sierra Leone. The new constitution ensured Sierra Leone had a parliamentary system within the Commonwealth of Nations. In May 1957, Sierra Leone held its first parliamentary election. The SLPP won the most seats in Parliament and Margai was re-elected as Chief Minister by a landslide.

=== Independence and post-independence era ===
On 27 April 1961, Margai led Sierra Leone to independence from Great Britain and became the country's first prime minister. Sierra Leone had its own parliament, its own prime minister, and the ability to make its own laws, but like countries such as Canada and Australia, Sierra Leone remained a "Dominion" and Queen Elizabeth was Queen of the independent Dominion of Sierra Leone. The Dominion of Sierra Leone retained a parliamentary system of government and was a member of the Commonwealth of Nations. The leader of the main opposition All People's Congress (APC), Siaka Stevens, along with Isaac Wallace-Johnson, another outspoken critic of the SLPP government, were arrested and placed under house arrest in Freetown.

In May 1962, Sierra Leone held its first general election as an independent state. The SLPP won a plurality of seats in parliament, and Margai was reelected as prime minister. Margai was popular among Sierra Leoneans during his time in power. He was not corrupt, nor did he make lavish displays of his power or status. He based the government on the rule of law and the separation of powers, with multiparty political institutions and fairly viable representative structures. Margai employed a brokerage style of politics, sharing power among political parties and interest groups, especially the powerful paramount chiefs in the provinces, most of whom were key allies of his government.

==== Albert Margai's tenure (1964–1967) ====
Upon Margai's unexpected death in 1964, his younger half-brother, Sir Albert Margai, was appointed as prime minister by parliament. Sir Albert's leadership was briefly challenged by Foreign Minister John Karefa-Smart, who questioned his succession to the SLPP leadership position. But Karefa-Smart lacked broad support within the SLPP in his attempt to oust Albert as both the leader of the SLPP and prime minister. Soon after Albert Margai was sworn in as prime minister, he fired several senior government officials who had served in his brother's government, viewing them as a threat to his administration, including Karefa-Smart.

Sir Albert resorted to increasingly authoritarian actions in response to protests and enacted several laws against the opposition All People's Congress while attempting to establish a one-party state. He opposed to the colonial legacy of allowing executive powers to the Paramount Chiefs, many of whom had been his brother's allies. Accordingly, they began to consider Sir Albert a threat to the ruling houses across the country. Margai appointed many non-Creoles to the country's civil service in Freetown, in an overall diversification of the civil service, which had been dominated by Creoles. As a result, he became unpopular among Creoles, many of whom had supported Sir Milton. Margai sought to make the army homogeneously Mende, his own ethnic group, and was accused of favouring members of the Mende for prominent positions.

In 1967, riots broke out in Freetown against Margai's policies. In response, he declared a state of emergency across the country. He was accused of corruption and of a policy of affirmative action in favour of the Mende ethnic group. He also endeavoured to change Sierra Leone from a democracy to a one-party state.

==== 1967 General Election and military coups (1967–1968) ====
The APC, with its leader Siaka Stevens, narrowly won a small majority of seats in Parliament over the SLPP in a closely contested 1967 general election. Stevens was sworn in as prime minister on 21 March 1967.

Within hours of taking office, Stevens was ousted in a bloodless military coup led by Brigadier General David Lansana, the commander of the Sierra Leone Armed Forces. He was a close ally of Albert Margai, who had appointed him to the position in 1964. Lansana placed Stevens under house arrest in Freetown and insisted that the determination of the Prime Minister should await the election of the tribal representatives to the House. Stevens was later freed and fled the country, going into exile in neighbouring Guinea. On 23 March 1967, a group of military officers in the Sierra Leone Army led by Brigadier General Andrew Juxon-Smith staged a counter-coup against Lansana. They seized control of the government, arrested Lansana, and suspended the constitution. The group set up the National Reformation Council (NRC), with Juxon-Smith as its chairman and Head of State of the country.

On 18 April 1968 a group of low-ranking soldiers in the Sierra Leone Army who called themselves the Anti-Corruption Revolutionary Movement (ACRM), led by Brigadier General John Amadu Bangura, overthrew the NRC junta. The ACRM arrested many senior NRC members. They reinstated the constitution and returned power to Stevens, who at last assumed the office of prime minister.

Stevens had Bangura arrested in 1970 and charged with conspiracy and treason. He was found guilty and sentenced to death, even though his actions had led to Stevens's return to power. Lansana and Hinga Norman, the main army officers involved in the first coup (1967), were unceremoniously dismissed from the armed forces and made to serve time in prison. Norman was a guard to Governor-general Sir Henry Lightfoot-Boston. Lansana was tried, found guilty of treason, and sentenced to death in 1975.

==== One-party state and dawn of the 'Republic' (1968–1991) ====
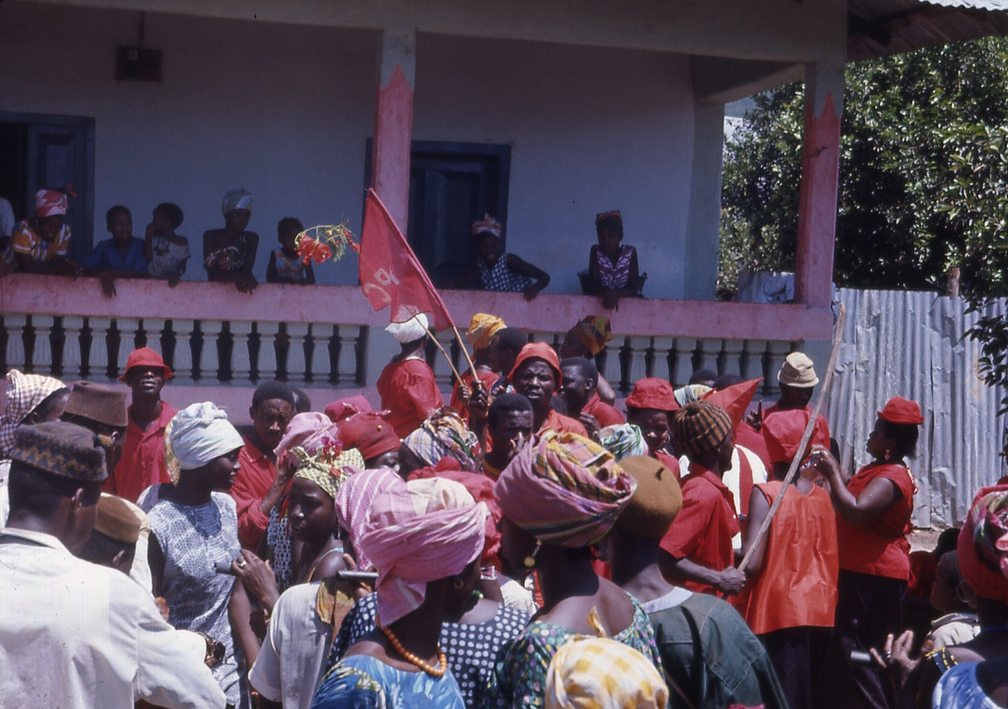
An APC political rally in the northern town of Kabala outside the home of supporters of the rival SLPP in 1968

Stevens assumed power as prime minister again in 1968, following a series of coups. He had campaigned on a platform of socialist principles, but abandoned them and employed an authoritarian government. During his first decade or so in power, Stevens renegotiated some of what he called "useless prefinanced schemes" contracted by his predecessors Albert Margai of the SLPP and Juxon-Smith of the NRC. Some of these policies were said to have left the country economically deprived.

Stevens reorganised the country's oil refinery, the government-owned Cape Sierra Hotel, and a cement factory. He began efforts that later improved transportation and movement between the provinces and Freetown. Roads and hospitals were constructed in the provinces, and Paramount Chiefs and provincial peoples became a prominent force in Freetown. Under the pressure of several coup attempts, real or perceived, Stevens's rule grew increasingly authoritarian, and his relationship with some of his supporters deteriorated. He removed the SLPP from competitive politics in general elections, some believed, through violence and intimidation. To maintain the support of the military, Stevens retained the popular John Amadu Bangura as head of the Sierra Leone Armed Forces.

After the return to civilian rule, by-elections were held (beginning in autumn 1968) and an all-APC cabinet was appointed. In November 1968, unrest in the provinces led Stevens to declare a state of emergency across the country. Many senior officers in the Sierra Leone Army were greatly disappointed with Stevens's policies and his handling of the Sierra Leone Military, but none could confront him. Brigadier General Bangura, who had reinstated Stevens as prime minister, was widely considered the only person who could control Stevens. The army was devoted to Bangura. In September 1970, Stevens declared another state of emergency to counter an alleged officers' plot against him.

Bangura would indeed end up leading a coup against Stevens on 23 March 1971, which failed. Bangura and many plotters were executed afterwards, and dozens of other soldiers were arrested and convicted by a court martial in Freetown for their participation in the coup. Among the soldiers arrested was an army corporal, Foday Sankoh, a strong Bangura supporter, who later formed the Revolutionary United Front (RUF). Sankoh was jailed for seven years at Pademba Road Prison in Freetown.

Stevens was a close ally of Guinean president Ahmed Sékou Touré to the point where there was talk of unification between the two countries. Shortly after the 1971 coup, Sierra Leone and Guinea signed a defense agreement, and Guinean troops were stationed in the country to protect Stevens' government. These troops would remain until 1974.

In April 1971, a new republican constitution was adopted under which Stevens became president. In the 1972 by-elections, the opposition SLPP complained of intimidation and procedural obstruction by the APC and militia. These problems became so severe that the SLPP boycotted the 1973 general election; as a result, the APC won 84 of the 85 elected seats.

An alleged plot to overthrow President Stevens failed in 1974 and its leaders were executed in July 1975. In March 1976, Stevens was elected without opposition to a second five-year term as president.

In 1977, a nationwide student demonstration against the government disrupted Sierra Leone's politics. The demonstration was quickly put down by the army and Stevens's personal Special Security Division (SSD), a heavily armed paramilitary force he had created to protect him and maintain his hold on power. SSD officers were loyal to Stevens and were deployed across the country to clamp down on any rebellion or protest against his government. A general election was called later that year in which corruption was again endemic; the APC won 74 seats and the SLPP 15. In 1978, the APC-dominant parliament approved a new constitution making the country a one-party state. The 1978 constitution made the APC the only legal political party in Sierra Leone. This move led to another major demonstration against the government in many parts of the country, which was also put down by the army and the SSD force.

Stevens is generally criticised for dictatorial methods and government corruption, but he kept the country stable and from collapsing into civil war. He created government institutions still in use. Stevens reduced ethnic polarisation in government by incorporating members of various ethnic groups into his all-dominant APC government.

Stevens retired from politics in November 1985. The APC named a new presidential candidate, Major General Joseph Saidu Momoh, head of the Sierra Leone Armed Forces. Momoh had been loyal to Stevens, who had appointed him to the position. Like Stevens, Momoh was a member of the minority Limba ethnic group. As the sole candidate, Momoh was elected president without opposition and sworn in as Sierra Leone's second president on 28 November 1985 in Freetown. President Momoh appointed his former military colleague and key ally, Major General Mohamed Tarawalie, to succeed him as head of the Sierra Leone Military. Momoh named James Bambay Kamara head of the Sierra Leone Police. Bambay Kamara was also a strong Momoh loyalist and supporter. Momoh broke from Stevens by integrating the SSD into the Sierra Leone Police as a special paramilitary force. Under Stevens, the SSD had been a personal force used to maintain his hold on power, independent from the Sierra Leone Military and Sierra Leone Police Force. The Sierra Leone Police under Bambay Kamara's leadership was accused of physical violence, arrest, and intimidation against critics of Momoh's government.

Momoh's strong links with the army and verbal attacks on corruption earned him initial support among Sierra Leoneans. With the lack of new faces in the APC cabinet under Momoh and the return of many from Stevens's government, criticisms soon arose that Momoh was simply perpetuating the rule of Stevens.

The next few years under the Momoh administration were characterised by corruption, which Momoh defused by sacking several senior cabinet ministers. To formalise his war against corruption, Momoh announced a "Code of Conduct for Political Leaders and Public Servants". After an alleged attempt to overthrow Momoh in March 1987, more than 60 senior government officials were arrested, including Vice-President Francis Minah, who was convicted of plotting the coup and executed by hanging in 1989.

=== Sierra Leone Civil War (1991–2002) and the NPRC regime (1992–1996) ===
The brutal civil war significantly impacted Sierra Leone, with internal and external factors contributing to widespread violence. International interventions, notably by the United Kingdom and the United Nations, were crucial in restoring peace.

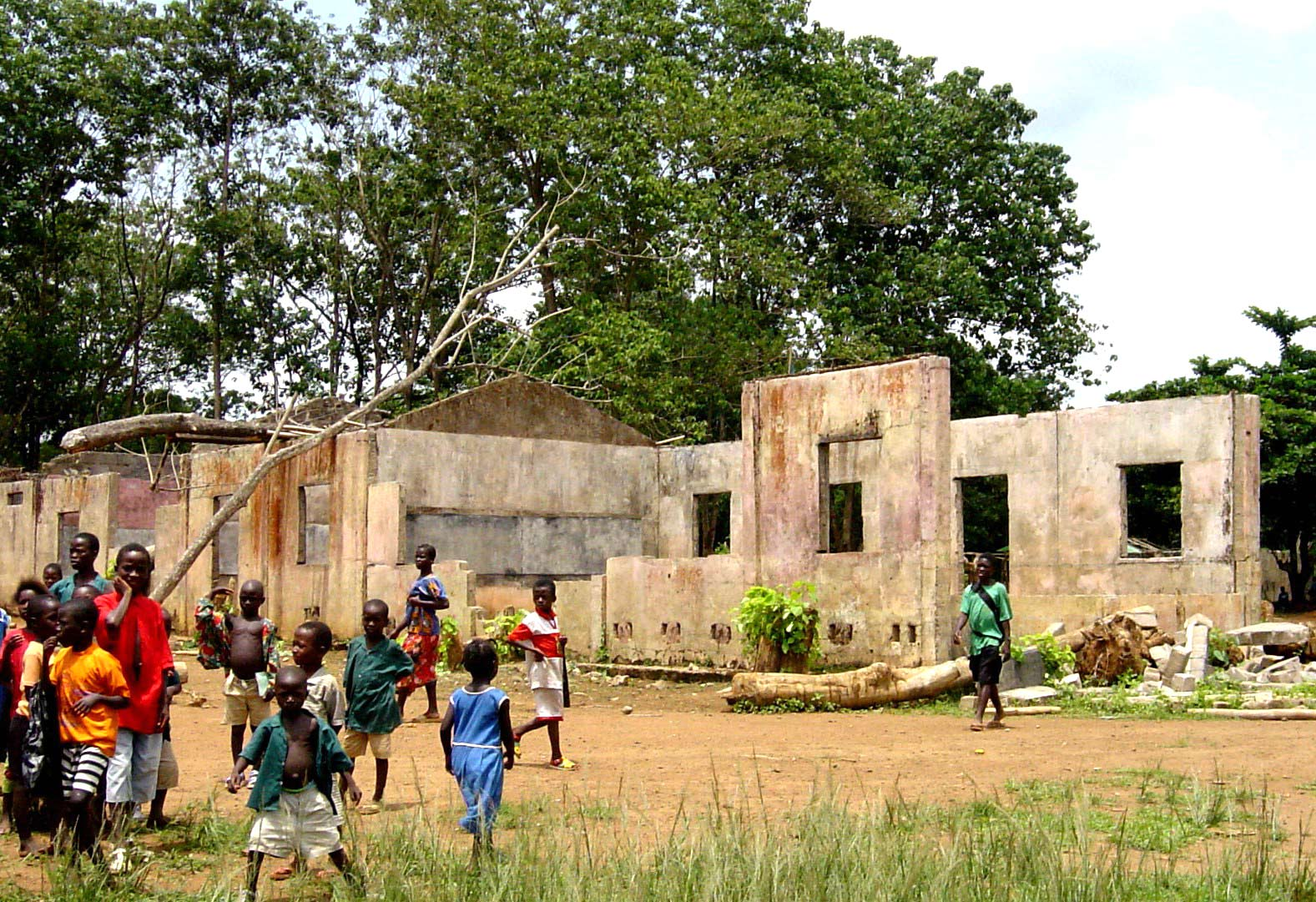
A school in Koindu destroyed during the Civil War; in total 1,270 primary schools were destroyed in the War.

In October 1990, owing to mounting pressure from both within and outside the country for political and economic reforms, Momoh set up a constitutional review commission to assess the 1978 one-party constitution. Based on the commission's recommendations, a constitution reestablishing a multi-party system was approved by the exclusive APC Parliament by a 60% majority vote, becoming effective on 1 October 1991. It was widely suspected that Momoh was not serious about political reform, as APC rule was increasingly marked by abuses of power.

The brutal civil war in neighbouring Liberia played a significant role in the outbreak of fighting in Sierra Leone. Charles Taylor, then leader of the National Patriotic Front of Liberia, reportedly helped form the Revolutionary United Front (RUF) under the command of former Sierra Leonean army corporal Foday Saybana Sankoh, an ethnic Temne from Tonkolili District in Northern Sierra Leone. Taylor's aim was for the RUF to attack the bases of Nigerian-dominated peacekeeping troops in Sierra Leone who opposed his rebel movement in Liberia.

On 29 April 1992, a group of young soldiers in the Sierra Leone Army, led by seven army officers—Lieutenant Sahr Sandy, Captain Valentine Strasser, Lieutenant Solomon "SAJ" Musa, Captain Komba Mondeh, Lieutenant Tom Nyuma, Captain Julius Maada Bio and Captain Komba Kambo—staged a military coup that sent Momoh into exile in Guinea, and the soldiers established the National Provisional Ruling Council (NPRC), with 25-year-old Captain Valentine Strasser as its chairman and Head of State of the country. The NPRC junta immediately suspended the constitution, banned all political parties, limited freedom of speech and freedom of the press, and enacted a rule-by-decree policy, in which soldiers were granted unlimited powers of administrative detention without charge or trial, and challenges against such detentions in court were precluded.

SAJ Musa, a childhood friend of Strasser, became the deputy chairman and deputy leader of the NPRC government. Strasser became the world's youngest head of state when he seized power just three days after his 25th birthday. The NPRC established the National Supreme Council of State as the military highest command and final authority in all matters and was exclusively made up of the highest-ranking NPRC soldiers, including Strasser and the others who toppled Momoh.

One of the top-ranking soldiers in the NPRC junta, Lieutenant Sahr Sandy, a trusted ally of Strasser, was assassinated, allegedly by Major S.I.M. Turay, a key loyalist of Momoh. A heavily armed military manhunt was carried out across the country to find Sandy's killer. Turay, the main suspect, fled to Guinea. Dozens of soldiers loyal to Momoh were arrested, including Colonel Kahota M. Dumbuya and Major Yayah Turay.

The NPRC maintained relations with ECOWAS and strengthened support for Sierra Leone-based ECOMOG troops fighting in the Liberian war. On 28 December 1992, an alleged coup attempt against the NPRC government aimed at freeing the detained Colonel Yahya Kanu, Colonel Kahota M.S. Dumbuya, and former inspector general of police Bambay Kamara, was foiled. Several Junior army officers led by Sergeant Mohamed Lamin Bangura were identified as being behind the coup plot. The coup plot led to the execution of 17 soldiers by firing squad. Some of those executed include Colonel Kahota Dumbuya, Major Yayah Kanu, and Sergeant Mohamed Lamin Bangura. Several prominent members of the Momoh government who had been in detention at the Pa Demba Road prison, including former inspector general of police Bambay Kamara, were also executed.

On 5 July 1994 SAJ Musa, who was popular among the general population, particularly in Freetown, was arrested and sent into exile after he was accused of planning a coup to topple Strasser, an accusation SAJ Musa denied. Strasser replaced Musa as deputy NPRC chairman with Captain Bio and instantly promoted him to brigadier.

The NPRC's efforts proved nearly as ineffective as the Momoh administration in repelling the RUF rebels. More and more of the country fell into the RUF fighters' hands, and by 1994 they had gained control of much of the diamond-rich Eastern Province and were getting close to Freetown. In response, the NPRC hired several hundred mercenary fighters from South Africa-based private military contractor Executive Outcomes to strengthen the response to RUF rebels. Within a month, they drove the RUF fighters back to enclaves along Sierra Leone's borders and cleared the RUF from the Kono diamond-producing areas of Sierra Leone.

With Strasser's two most senior NPRC allies and commanders Lieutenant Sahr Sandy and Lieutenant Solomon Musa no longer around to defend him, Strasser's leadership within the NPRC's Supreme Council of State became fragile. On 16 January 1996, after about four years in power, Strasser was arrested in a palace coup staged by his fellow NPRC soldiers led by Brigadier Bio at the Defence Headquarters in Freetown. Strasser was immediately flown into exile in a military helicopter to Conakry, Guinea. In his first public broadcast to the nation after the 1996 coup, Brigadier Bio said that returning Sierra Leone to a democratically elected civilian government and ending the civil war were his motivations for the coup.

==== Kabbah's tenure: government, "dawn of a new republic", the AFRC and end of the Civil War (1996–2007) ====
Following the 1995 National Consultative Conference at the Bintumani Hotel in Freetown, dubbed "Bintumani I", a Strasser-led initiative, the Bio administration initiated another National Consultative Conference at the same hotel, dubbed "Bintumani II". It involved both national and international stakeholders, in an effort to find a viable solution to the issues plaguing the country. "Peace before Elections vs Elections before Peace" became a key debate topic and this quickly became a point of national discussion. The discussions eventually concluded with key stakeholders, including Bio's administration and the UN, agreeing that while efforts in finding a peaceful solution to ending the war should continue, a general election should be held as soon as possible. Bio handed power over to Ahmad Tejan Kabbah of the SLPP, after the conclusion of elections in early 1996 which Kabbah won. After taking over, President Kabbah immediately opened dialogue with the RUF and invited their leader Foday Sankoh for peace negotiations.

On 25 May 1997, 17 soldiers in the Sierra Leone army led by Corporal Tamba Gborie, loyal to the detained Major Johnny Paul Koroma, launched a military coup which sent President Kabbah into exile in Guinea and they established the Armed Forces Revolutionary Council (AFRC). Gborie quickly went to the Sierra Leone Broadcasting Services headquarters in New England, Freetown to announce the coup to a shocked nation and to alert all soldiers across the country to report for guard duty. The soldiers immediately released Koroma from prison and installed him as their chairman and Head of State.

Koroma suspended the constitution, banned demonstrations, shut down all private radio stations in the country and invited the RUF to join the new junta government, with its leader Foday Sankoh as the Vice-Chairman of the new AFRC-RUF coalition junta government. Within days, Freetown was overwhelmed by the presence of the RUF combatants. The Kamajors, a group of traditional fighters mostly from the Mende ethnic group under the command of deputy Defence Minister Samuel Hinga Norman, remained loyal to President Kabbah and defended the Southern part of Sierra Leone from the soldiers.

After nine months in office, the junta was overthrown by the Nigerian-led ECOMOG forces, and the democratically elected government of president Kabbah was reinstated in February 1998. On 19 October 1998, 24 soldiers in the Sierra Leone army—including Gborie, Brigadier Hassan Karim Conteh, Colonel Samuel Francis Koroma, Major Kula Samba and Colonel Abdul Karim Sesay—were executed by firing squad after they were convicted in a court martial in Freetown, some for orchestrating the 1997 coup that overthrew President Kabbah and others for failure to reverse the mutiny.

In October 1999, the United Nations agreed to send peacekeepers to help restore order and disarm the rebels. The first of the 6,000-member force began arriving in December, and the UN Security Council voted in February 2000 to increase the force to 11,000, and later to 13,000. But in May, when nearly all Nigerian forces had left and UN forces were trying to disarm the RUF in eastern Sierra Leone, Sankoh's forces clashed with the UN troops, and some 500 peacekeepers were taken hostage as the peace accord effectively collapsed. The hostage crisis resulted in more fighting between the RUF and the government as UN troops launched Operation Khukri to end the siege.

The situation in the country deteriorated to such an extent that British troops were deployed in Operation Palliser, originally simply to evacuate foreign nationals. But the British exceeded their original mandate and took full military action to defeat the rebels and restore order. The British were the catalyst for the ceasefire that ended the civil war. Elements of the British Army, together with administrators and politicians, remained after withdrawal to help train the armed forces, improve the country's infrastructure, and administer financial and material aid. Tony Blair, the Prime Minister of Britain at the time, is regarded as a hero by the people of Sierra Leone.

Between 1991 and 2001, about 50,000 people were killed in Sierra Leone's civil war. Hundreds of thousands of people were forced from their homes and many became refugees in Guinea and Liberia. In 2001, UN forces moved into rebel-held areas and began to disarm rebel soldiers. By January 2002, the war was declared over. In May 2002, Kabbah was reelected president by a landslide. By 2004, the disarmament process was complete. Also in 2004, a UN-backed war crimes court began holding trials of senior leaders from both sides of the war. In December 2005, UN peacekeeping forces pulled out of Sierra Leone.

=== 2007 election and beyond ===
The elections in 2007 and 2012 marked a return to multi-party democracy, with Ernest Bai Koroma's election signalling a period of stability and recovery from the civil war.

The Ebola epidemic in 2014 posed a significant health crisis, leading to a national state of emergency.

In March 2018, a general election in Sierra Leone resulted in Julius Maada Bio becoming president, and the subsequent inauguration of parliament amidst a police intervention.

In August 2022, Sierra Leone faced a series of violent protests. They were triggered by the nation's cost of living crisis, leading to the implementation of a nationwide curfew. The anti-government protests resulted in the deaths of 33 people, a figure comprising 27 civilians and 6 police officers.

In 2025, the Gowa-Tiwai Complex of Sierra Leone's eastern and southern provinces, consisting of the Gola Rainforest National Park and the Tiwai Island Wildlife Sanctuary for their exceptional biodiversity, was inscribed as a UNESCO World Heritage Site.

== Geography ==
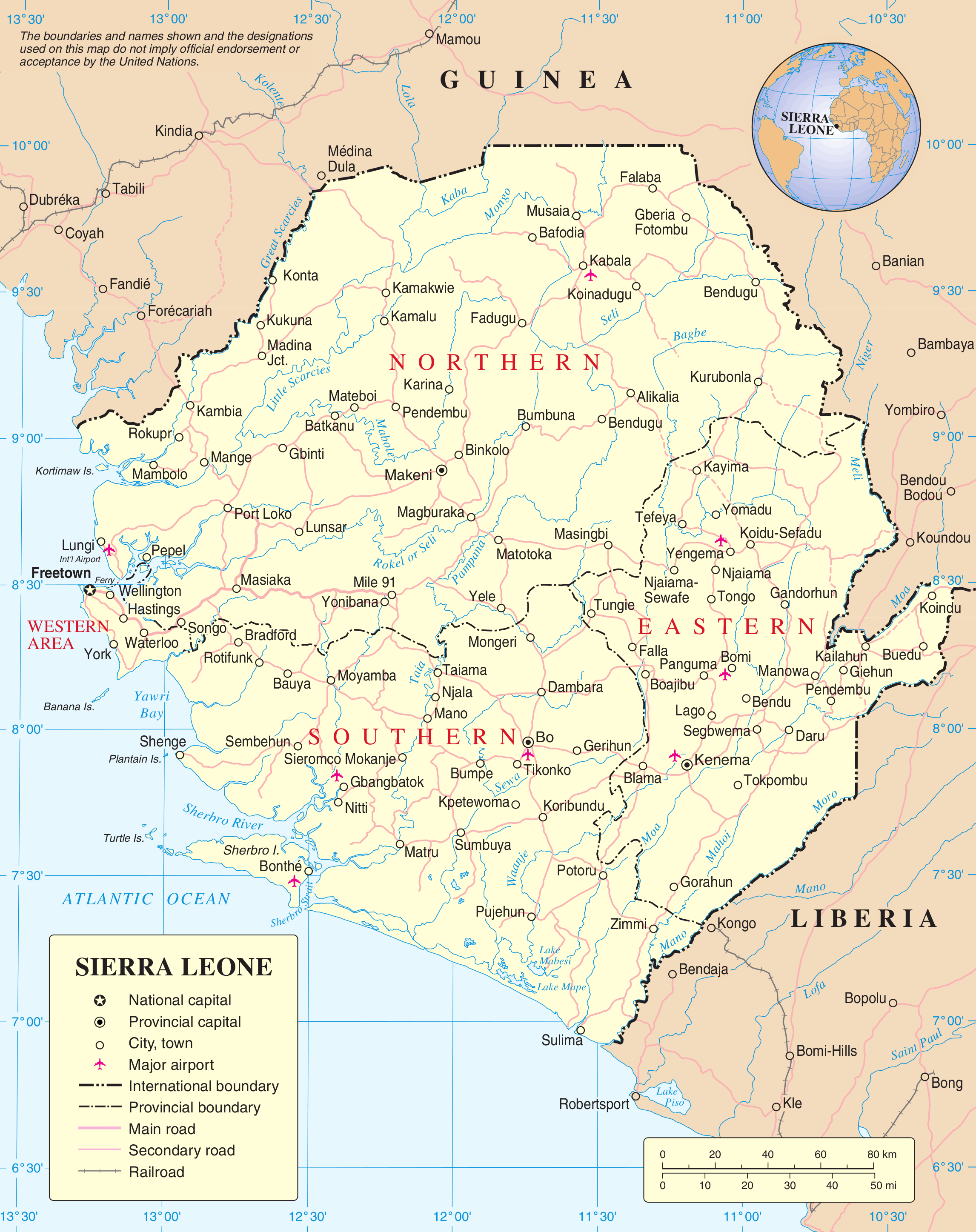
A map of Sierra Leone

Sierra Leone map of Köppen climate classification

Sierra Leone is on the southwest coast of West Africa, mostly between latitudes 7° and 10°N (a small area is south of 7°), and longitudes 10° and 14°W. It is bordered by Guinea to the north and east, Liberia to the southeast, and the Atlantic Ocean to the west and southwest. It has an area of 73,252 km^{2} (28,283 sq mi), divided into a land area of 73,132 km^{2} (28,236 sq mi) and water of 120 km^{2} (46 sq mi).

In eastern Sierra Leone the plateau is interspersed with high mountains, where Mount Bintumani reaches 1,948 m (6,391 ft), the highest point in the country. The upper part of the drainage basin of the Moa River is in the south of this region.

The centre of the country is a region of lowland plains, containing forests, bush and farmland, that occupies about 43% of Sierra Leone's land area. The northern section of this has been categorised by the World Wildlife Fund as part of the Guinean forest-savannah mosaic ecoregion, while the south is rain-forested plains and farmland.

In the west, Sierra Leone has 400 km (249 mi) of Atlantic coastline, giving it both bountiful marine resources and attractive tourist potential. The coast has areas of low-lying Guinean mangroves swamp. Freetown sits on a mountainous coastal peninsula next to the Sierra Leone Harbour.

The climate is tropical, with two seasons determining the agricultural cycle: the rainy season from May to November, and a dry season from December to May, which includes harmattan, when cool, dry winds blow in off the Sahara Desert and the nighttime temperature can be as low as 16 °C (60.8 °F). The average temperature is 26 °C (78.8 °F) and varies from around 26 to 36 °C (78.8 to 96.8 °F) during the year.

== Government and politics ==
Sierra Leone is a constitutional republic with a directly elected president and a unicameral legislature. The current system of the Government of Sierra Leone is based on the 1991 Sierra Leone Constitution. Sierra Leone has a dominant unitary central government and a weak local government. The executive branch, headed by the president of Sierra Leone has extensive powers and influence. The president is the most powerful government official in Sierra Leone.

The president is the head of state, the head of government, and the commander-in-chief of the Sierra Leone Armed Forces. The president appoints and heads a cabinet of ministers, which must be approved by the Parliament. The president is elected by popular vote to a maximum of two five-year terms. To be elected president of Sierra Leone, a candidate must gain at least 55% of the vote. If no candidate gets 55%, there is a second-round runoff between the top two candidates. The current president of Sierra Leone is former military junta leader Julius Maada Bio. Bio is the leader of the Sierra Leone People's Party, the current ruling party in Sierra Leone.

Next to the president is the vice-president, who is the second highest-ranking government official in the executive branch of the Sierra Leone Government. As designated by the Sierra Leone Constitution, the vice-president is to become the new president of Sierra Leone upon the death, resignation, or removal of the President.

=== Parliament ===
The Parliament of Sierra Leone is unicameral, with 149 seats. Each of the country's 16 districts is represented in parliament. 135 members are elected concurrently with the presidential elections; the other 14 seats are filled by paramount chiefs from the country's administrative districts. The Sierra Leone parliament is led by the Speaker of Parliament, who is directly elected by sitting members of parliament. The current speaker of the Sierra Leone parliament is Segepoh Solomon Thomas, who was elected on 2 May 2024.

The current members of the Parliament of Sierra Leone were elected in the 2023 Sierra Leonean general election. The APC currently has 54 of the 135 elected parliamentary seats, and the Sierra Leone People's Party (SLPP) has 81 of the seats. Members of parliament must be a citizen of Sierra Leone over age 21, a registered elector, and proficient in the English language. Since independence in 1961, Sierra Leone's politics has been dominated by two major political parties: the SLPP and the APC. Other minor political parties have also existed but with no significant support.

=== Judiciary ===
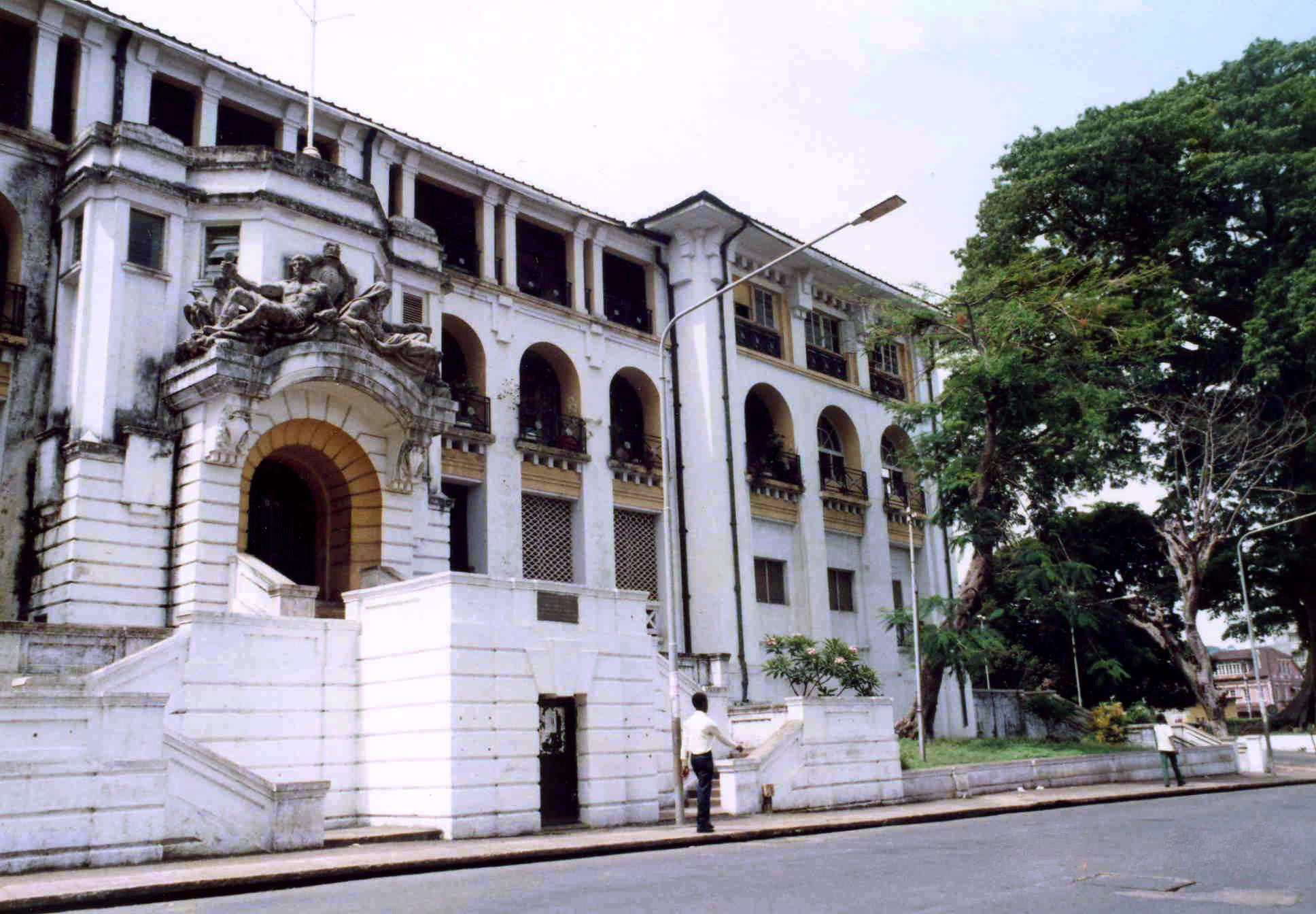
The Sierra Leone Supreme Court in the capital Freetown, the highest and most powerful court in the country

The judicial power of Sierra Leone is vested in the judiciary, headed by the Chief Justice of Sierra Leone and comprising the Supreme Court of Sierra Leone, which is the highest court in the country, meaning that its rulings, therefore, cannot be appealed against. Other courts are the High Court of Justice, the Court of Appeal, the magistrate courts, and traditional courts in rural villages led by a paramount chiefs and village elders that handle family and community dispute in civil cases. The president appoints and parliament approves Justices for the three courts. The Judiciary has jurisdiction in all civil and criminal matters throughout the country. The current acting chief justice of Sierra Leone is Desmond Babatunde Edwards. The Sierra Leone Judiciary is constitutionally independent from outside influences, but in practice, the president of Sierra Leone has large unofficial power and influences over the Judiciary, including the influence to remove a sitting judge.

=== Foreign relations ===
The Sierra Leonean Ministry of Foreign Affairs and International Cooperation is responsible for foreign policy of Sierra Leone. Sierra Leone has diplomatic relations that include China, Russia, Libya, Iran, and Cuba.

Sierra Leone has good relations with the West, including the United States, and has maintained historical ties with the United Kingdom and other former British colonies through its membership of the Commonwealth of Nations. The United Kingdom has played a major role in providing aid to the former colony, together with administrative help and military training since intervening to end the Civil War in 2000.

Former president Siaka Stevens's government sought closer relations with other West African countries under the Economic Community of West African States (ECOWAS), a policy continued by the current government. Sierra Leone, Liberia, Ivory Coast, and Guinea form the Mano River Union (MRU). It is primarily designed to implement development projects and promote regional economic integration between the four countries.

Sierra Leone is also a member of the United Nations and its specialised agencies, the African Union, the African Development Bank (AFDB), the Organisation of Islamic Cooperation (OIC), and the Non-Aligned Movement (NAM). Sierra Leone is a member of the International Criminal Court with a Bilateral Immunity Agreement of protection for the US military (as covered under Article 98).

Sierra Leone is the 66th most peaceful country in the world, according to the 2024 Global Peace Index.

=== Military ===
The Military of Sierra Leone, officially the Republic of Sierra Leone Armed Forces (RSLAF), are the unified armed forces of Sierra Leone responsible for the territorial security of Sierra Leone's border and defending the national interests of Sierra Leone within the framework of its international obligations. The armed forces were formed after independence in 1961, based on elements of the former British Royal West African Frontier Force present in the country. The Sierra Leone Armed Forces consist of around 15,500 personnel, comprising the largest Sierra Leone Army, the Sierra Leone Navy and the Sierra Leone Air Wing.

The president of Sierra Leone is the Commander in Chief of the military and the Minister of Defence responsible for defence policy and the formulation of the armed forces.

When Sierra Leone gained independence in 1961, the Royal Sierra Leone Military Force was created from the Sierra Leone Battalion of the West African Frontier Force. The military seized control in 1968, bringing the National Reformation Council into power. On 19 April 1971, when Sierra Leone became a republic, the Royal Sierra Leone Military Forces were renamed the Republic of Sierra Leone Military Force (RSLMF). The RSLMF remained a single-service organisation until 1979 when the Sierra Leone Navy was established. In 1995 Defence Headquarters was established, and the Sierra Leone Air Wing was formed. The RSLMF was renamed as the Armed Forces of the Republic of Sierra Leone (AFRSL).

=== Law enforcement ===
Law enforcement in Sierra Leone is primarily the responsibility of the Sierra Leone Police (SLP), which is accountable to the Minister of Internal Affairs (appointed by the president). Sierra Leone Police was established by the British colony in 1894; it is one of the oldest police forces in West Africa. The Sierra Leone Police is headed by the Inspector General of Police, the professional head of the Sierra Leone Police force, who is appointed by the president of Sierra Leone.

Each of Sierra Leone's 14 districts is headed by a district police commissioner who is the professional head of their district. These commissioners report directly to the Inspector General of Police at the Sierra Leone Police headquarters in Freetown. The current Inspector General of Police is William Fayia Sellu, who was appointed to the position by President Julius Maada Bio on 27 July 2022.

=== Human rights ===
According to a 2015 US Department of State report, "the most significant human rights problems included a lack of universal access to justice; widespread official corruption in all branches of government; and trafficking in persons, including forced child labor." Excessive police brutality is also a frequent problem.

While discrimination on the basis of sex, colour, religion and political opinion is prohibited by the constitution, there is neither constitutional nor legal prohibition of discrimination that is based on sexual orientation, HIV-positive status or trans identity. Male same-sex sexual activity is illegal under Section 61 of the Offences against the Person Act 1861, and imprisonment for life is possible.

=== Leadership in World governance initiatives ===
Sierra Leone is one of the signatories of the agreement to hold a convention to draft a world constitution. As a result, in 1968, for the first time in human history, a World Constituent Assembly convened to draft and adopt the Constitution for the Federation of Earth. Milton Margai, then president of Sierra Leone, signed the agreement to convene a World Constituent Assembly.

=== Administrative divisions ===
The 14 districts and 2 areas of Sierra Leone

The Republic of Sierra Leone is composed of five regions: the Northern Province, North West Province, Southern Province, the Eastern Province, and the Western Area. Four provinces are further divided into 14 districts; the Western Area is divided into two districts.

The provincial districts are divided into 186 chiefdoms, which have traditionally been led by paramount chiefs, recognised by the British administration in 1896 at the time of organising the Protectorate of Sierra Leone. The Paramount Chiefs are influential, particularly in villages and small rural towns. Each chiefdom has ruling families that were recognised at that time; the Tribal Authority, made up of local notables, elects the paramount chief from the ruling families. Typically, chiefs have the power to "raise taxes, control the judicial system, and allocate land, the most important resource in rural areas".

Within the context of local governance, the districts are governed as localities. Each has a directly elected local district council to exercise authority and carry out functions at a local level. In total, there are 19 local councils: 13 district councils, one for each of the 12 districts and one for the Western Area Rural, and six municipalities also have elected local councils. The six municipalities include Freetown, which functions as the local government for the Western Area Urban District, and Bo, Bonthe, Kenema, Koidu, and Makeni.

While the district councils are under the oversight of their respective provincial administrations, the municipalities are directly overseen by the Ministry of Local Government & Community Development and thus administratively independent of district and provincial administrations.

District		Area (km^{2})	Province	Population (2004 census)	Population (2015 census)
Bombali District	Makeni	7,985	Northern; Province	408,390	606,183
Koinadugu District	Kabala	12,121	Northern; Province	265,758	408,097
Port Loko District	Port Loko	5,719	Northern; Province	453,746	614,063
Tonkolili District	Magburaka	7,003	Northern; Province	347,197	530,776
Kambia District	Kambia	3,108	Northern; Province	270,462	343,686
Kenema District	Kenema	6,053	Eastern; Province	497,948	609,873
Kono District	Koidu Town	5,641	Eastern; Province	335,401	505,767
Kailahun District	Kailahun	3,859	Eastern; Province	358,190	525,372
Bo District	Bo	5,219	Southern; Province	463,668	574,201
Bonthe District	Mattru Jong	3,468	Southern; Province	139,687	200,730
Pujehun District	Pujehun	4,105	Southern; Province	228,392	345,577
Moyamba District	Moyamba	6,902	Southern; Province	260,910	318,064
Western Area Urban District	Freetown	13	Western; Area	772,873	1,050,301
Western Area Rural District	Waterloo	544	Western; Area	174,249	442,951

== Economy ==
Historical GDP per capita development

Percentage of GDP by sector (2007)
Rank	Sector	Percentage of GDP
1	Agriculture	58.5
2	Other services	10.4
3	Trade and tourism	9.5
4	Wholesale and retail trade	9.0
5	Mining and quarrying	4.5
6	Government Services	4.0
7	Manufacturing and handicrafts	2.0
8	Construction	1.7
9	Electricity and water	0.4

By the 1990s, economic activity was declining and economic infrastructure had become seriously degraded. Over the next decade, much of the formal economy was destroyed in the country's civil war. Since the end of hostilities in 2002, massive infusions of outside assistance have helped Sierra Leone recover.

Much of the recovery depends on the success of the government's efforts to limit corruption by officials, which many feel was the chief cause of the civil war. A key indicator of success is the effectiveness of government management of its diamond sector.

There is high unemployment, particularly among the youth and ex-combatants. Authorities have been slow to implement reforms in the civil service, and the pace of the privatisation programme is also slackening and donors have urged its advancement. As of the most recent survey in 2019, 59.2% of the population continues to be affected by multidimensional poverty and an additional 21.3% vulnerable to it.

The currency is the leone. The central bank is the Bank of Sierra Leone. Sierra Leone operates a floating exchange rate system, and foreign currencies can be exchanged at any of the commercial banks, recognised foreign exchange bureaux and most hotels. Credit card use is limited in Sierra Leone, but they are used at some hotels and restaurants. There are a few internationally linked automated teller machines that accept Visa cards in Freetown.

=== Agriculture ===
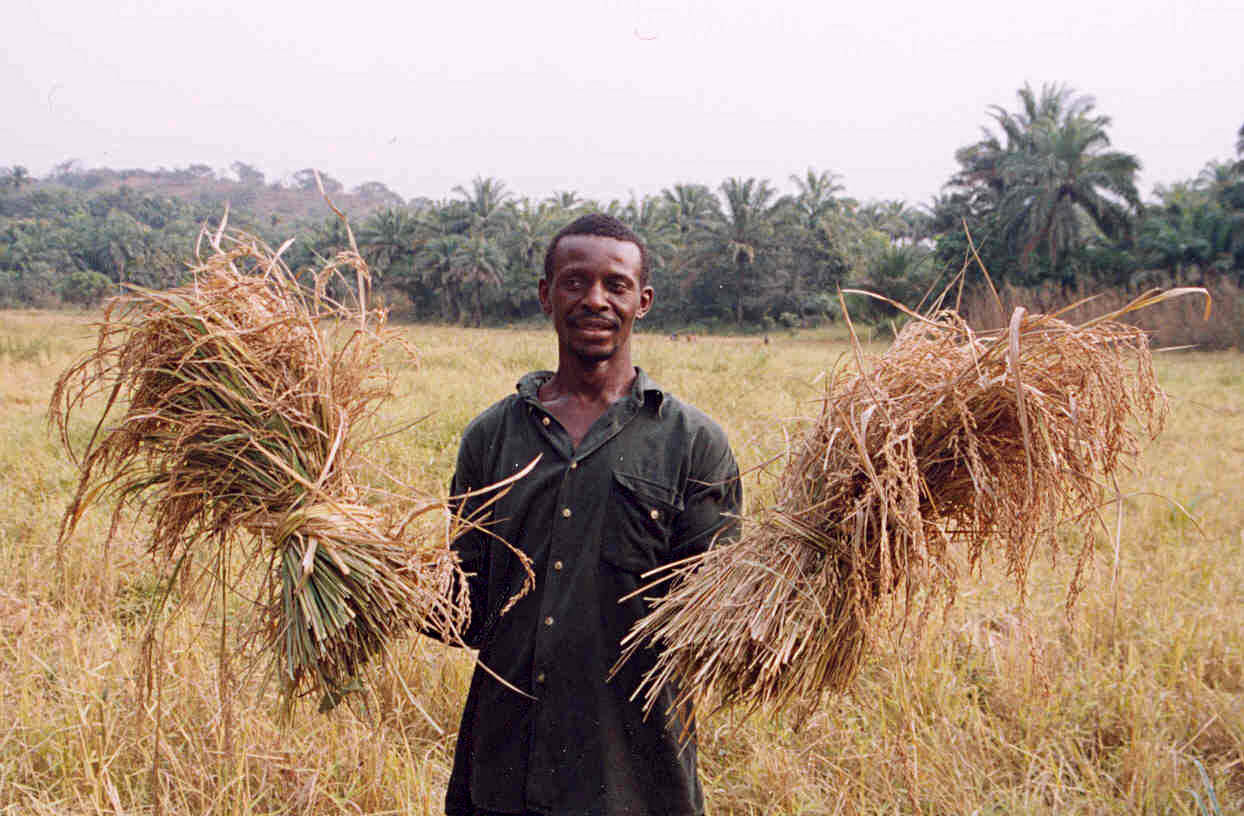
A farmer with his rice harvest in Sierra Leone. Two-thirds of Sierra Leone's population are directly involved in subsistence agriculture.

Two-thirds of Sierra Leone's population is directly involved in subsistence agriculture. Agriculture accounted for 58 per cent of gross domestic product (GDP) in 2007.

Agriculture is the largest employer with 80 per cent of the population working in the sector. Rice is the most important staple crop in Sierra Leone, with 85 per cent of farmers cultivating it during the rainy season and an annual consumption of 76 kg (167.5 lbs) per person.

=== Mining ===
Rich in minerals, Sierra Leone has relied on mining, especially diamonds, for its economic base. The country is among the top ten diamond producing countries. Mineral exports remain the main currency earner. Sierra Leone is a major producer of gem-quality diamonds. Though rich in diamonds, it has historically struggled to manage their exploitation and export.

Sierra Leone is known for its blood diamonds that were mined and sold to diamond conglomerates during the civil war to buy the weapons that fuelled its atrocities. In the 1970s and early 1980s, economic growth slowed because of a decline in the mining sector and increasing corruption among government officials.

Annual production of Sierra Leone's diamond estimates a range between US$250 million–$300 million. Some of that is smuggled and used for money laundering or financing illicit activities. Formal exports have dramatically improved since the civil war, with efforts to improve their management having some success. In 2000, a UN-approved certification system for exporting diamonds from the country was put in place that led to a dramatic increase in legal exports. In 2001, the government created a mining community development fund (DACDF), which returns a portion of diamond export taxes to diamond mining communities. The fund was created to raise local communities' stakes in the legal diamond trade.

Sierra Leone has one of the world's largest deposits of rutile, a titanium ore.

=== Transport infrastructure ===
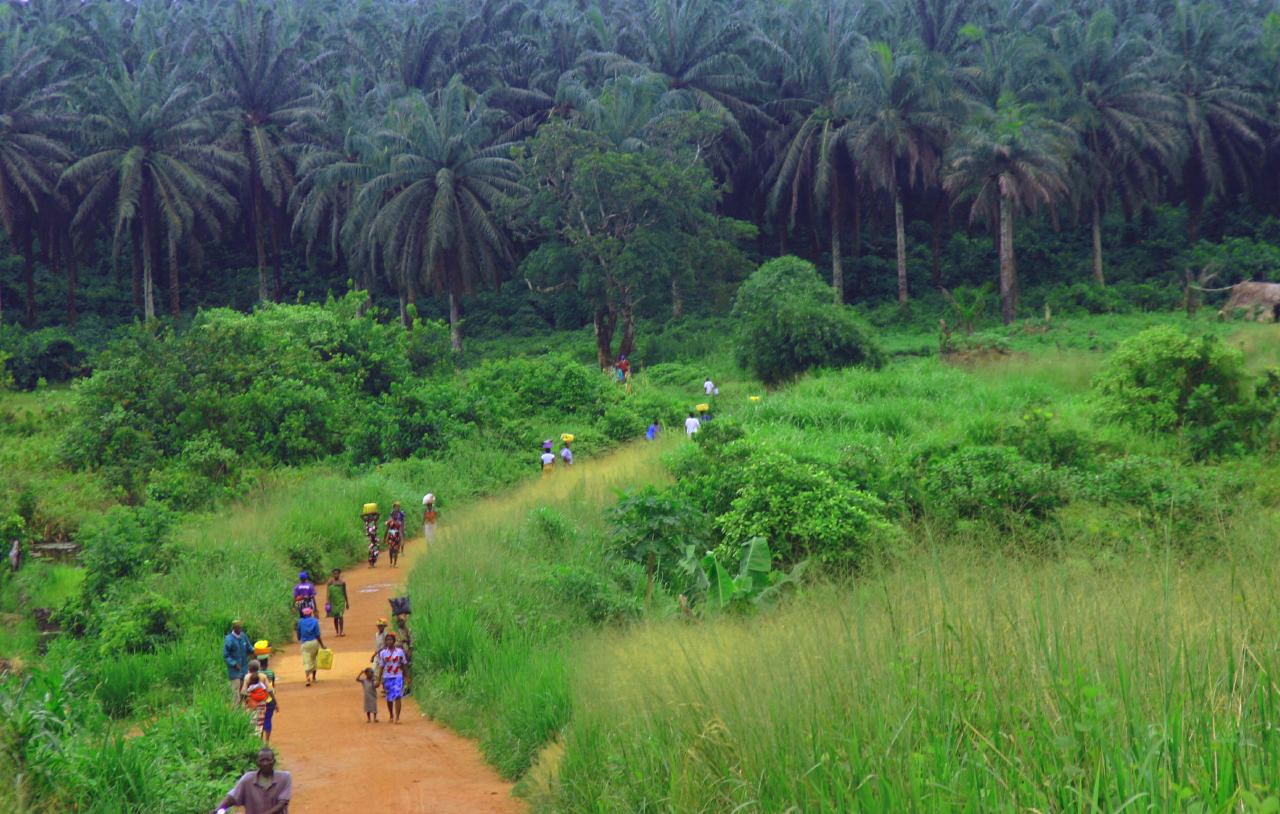
The road from Kenema to Kailahun District

There are several systems of transport in Sierra Leone, which has a road, air and water infrastructure, including a network of highways and several airports. There are 11,300 kilometres (7,000 miles) of highways in Sierra Leone, of which 904 km (562 mi) are paved (about 8%). Sierra Leone's highways are linked to Conakry, Guinea, and Monrovia, Liberia.

Sierra Leone has Africa's largest natural harbour, allowing international shipping through the Queen Elizabeth II Quay in the Cline Town area of eastern Freetown or through Government Wharf in central Freetown. There are 800 km (497 mi) of waterways in Sierra Leone, of which 600 km (373 mi) are navigable year-round. Major port cities are Bonthe, Freetown, Sherbro Island and Pepel.

There are ten regional airports in Sierra Leone and one international airport. Freetown International Airport, in the coastal town of Lungi, is the primary airport for domestic and international travel to or from Sierra Leone. Passengers cross the river to Aberdeen or Kissy in Freetown by passenger ferry. A bridge is planned to cross the estuary with completion expected by the end of 2027. The airport has a paved runway of 3,200 metres (10,500 feet). The other airports have unpaved runways, and seven have runways from 914 to 1,523 metres (2,999 to 4,997 feet) long; the other two have shorter runways.

Sierra Leone appears on the EU list of prohibited countries with regard to the certification of airlines. This means that no airline registered in Sierra Leone may operate services of any kind within the European Union, due to substandard safety standards.

As of December 2024, the country's only international airport had regularly scheduled direct flights to Istanbul, Brussels and many major cities in Africa.

=== Energy ===
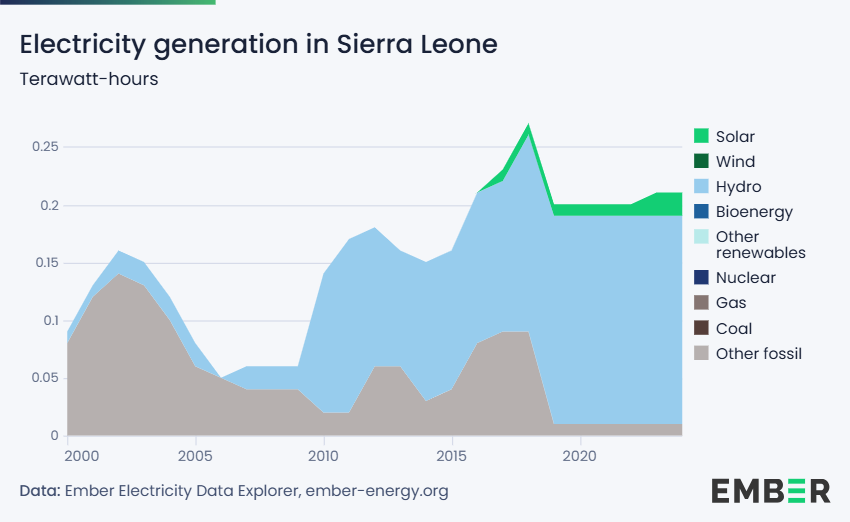
Electricity generation in Sierra Leone in terawatt-hours

As of 2016, about 12% of the population of Sierra Leone had access to electricity. Of that 12%, 10% was in Freetown, and the remaining 90% of the country used 2% of the nation's electricity. The majority of the population relies on biomass fuels, with firewood and coal used most prevalently. The burning of these sources has been reported to have adverse health effects on women and children. The use of coal and firewood has also posed environmental concerns as they are both in conflict with the push for more sustainable sources of energy. As a result, the commercialisation of firewood and coal has been a point of contention with aid donors and government agencies. There have been strong pushes for both solar and hydropower to become the dominant sources of energy. Sierra Leone's tropical climate, heavy annual rainfall, and abundance of rivers give it the potential to pursue more solar and hydropower alternatives.

In conjunction with the UK's Department for International Development (DFID), Sierra Leone set a goal to provide solar power to all its citizens by 2025. It aimed provide solar power to at least 50,000 homes in 2016, 250,000 homes by 2017, and 1,000,000 people by 2020. This initiative falls under the Energy Africa access campaign. Before this compact agreement, Sierra Leone's private sector for solar energy was weak, as it provided energy to less than 5% of the target population. Part of the reason for this was the import duties, taxes, and lack of quality control. To ensure that the Energy Africa goal is met, Sierra Leone has agreed to remove its import duties and Value Added Tax (VAT) on certified solar products. It is estimated that there will be a 30% to 40% cost reduction on solar products with the lack of duties and taxes.

As of 2012, Sierra Leone has three main hydroelectric plants: the Guma plant, which was decommissioned in 1982; the Dodo Plant, in the Eastern Province; and the Bumbuna plant. There is also potential for several new hydroelectric plants to open on the Sewa River, Pampana River, Seli River, Moa River, and Little Scarcies. The Bumbuna dam is the largest and was estimated to produce about 50 megawatts of electricity. It has been projected that the Bumbuna dam could reduce the amount of spending on foreign fuel and save the country at least $2 million a month.

== Demographics ==
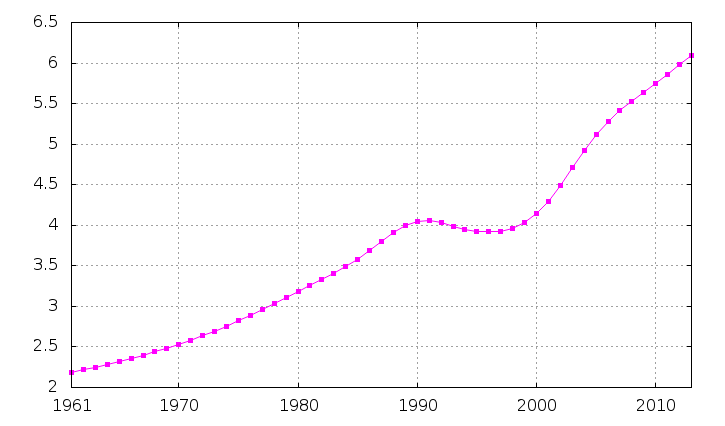
Sierra Leone's total population, from 1961 to 2013

In 2019 Sierra Leone had a population of 7,813,215 and a growth rate of 2.216% a year. The population is mostly young, with an estimated 41.7% under 15, and rural, with an estimated 62% of people living outside the cities. As a result of migration to cities, the population is becoming more urban with an estimated rate of urbanisation growth of 2.9% a year.

Population density varies greatly within Sierra Leone. The Western Area Urban District, including Freetown, the capital and largest city, has a population density of 1,224 persons per square km. The largest district geographically, Koinadugu, has a much lower density of 21.4 persons per square km.

English is the official language, spoken at schools, government administration and in the media. Krio (derived from English and several indigenous African languages, and the language of the Sierra Leone Creole people) is the most widely spoken language in virtually all parts of Sierra Leone. As the Krio language is spoken by 96% of the country's population, it unites all the different ethnic groups, especially in their trade and interaction with each other. Krio is the primary language of communication among Sierra Leoneans at home and abroad, and has also heavily influenced Sierra Leonean English.

After the contribution made by the Bangladesh UN Peacekeeping Force in the Sierra Leone Civil War under the United Nations Mission in Sierra Leone, the government of Ahmad Tejan Kabbah declared Bengali an honorary official language in December 2002.

According to the World Refugee Survey 2008, published by the US Committee for Refugees and Immigrants, Sierra Leone had a population of 8,700 refugees and asylum seekers at the end of 2007. Nearly 20,000 Liberian refugees voluntarily returned to Liberia over the course of 2007. Of the refugees remaining in Sierra Leone, nearly all were Liberian.

Largest cities or towns in Sierra Leone Government of Sierra Leone 2004 Census
Rank	Name	District	Pop.
1	Freetown	Western Area Urban District	853,651
2	Bo	Bo District	149,957
3	Kenema	Kenema District	128,402
4	Makeni	Bombali District	82,940
5	Koidu Town	Kono District	80,025
6	Lunsar	Port Loko District	24,450
7	Port Loko	Port Loko District	23,195
8	Pandebu-Tokpombu	Kenema District	20,219
9	Kabala	Koinadugu District	19,074
10	Waterloo	Western Area Urban District	18,579

The populations quoted above for the five largest cities are from the 2004 census. The figure for Freetown is for the Western Urban Area (Greater Freetown). Other figures are estimates from the source cited. Different sources give different estimates. Some claim that Magburaka should be included in the above list, but there is considerable difference among sources.

=== Religion ===
Religion in Sierra Leone (2020)
Religion	per cent
Islam	78.5%
Christianity	20.4%
Other faiths	1.1%

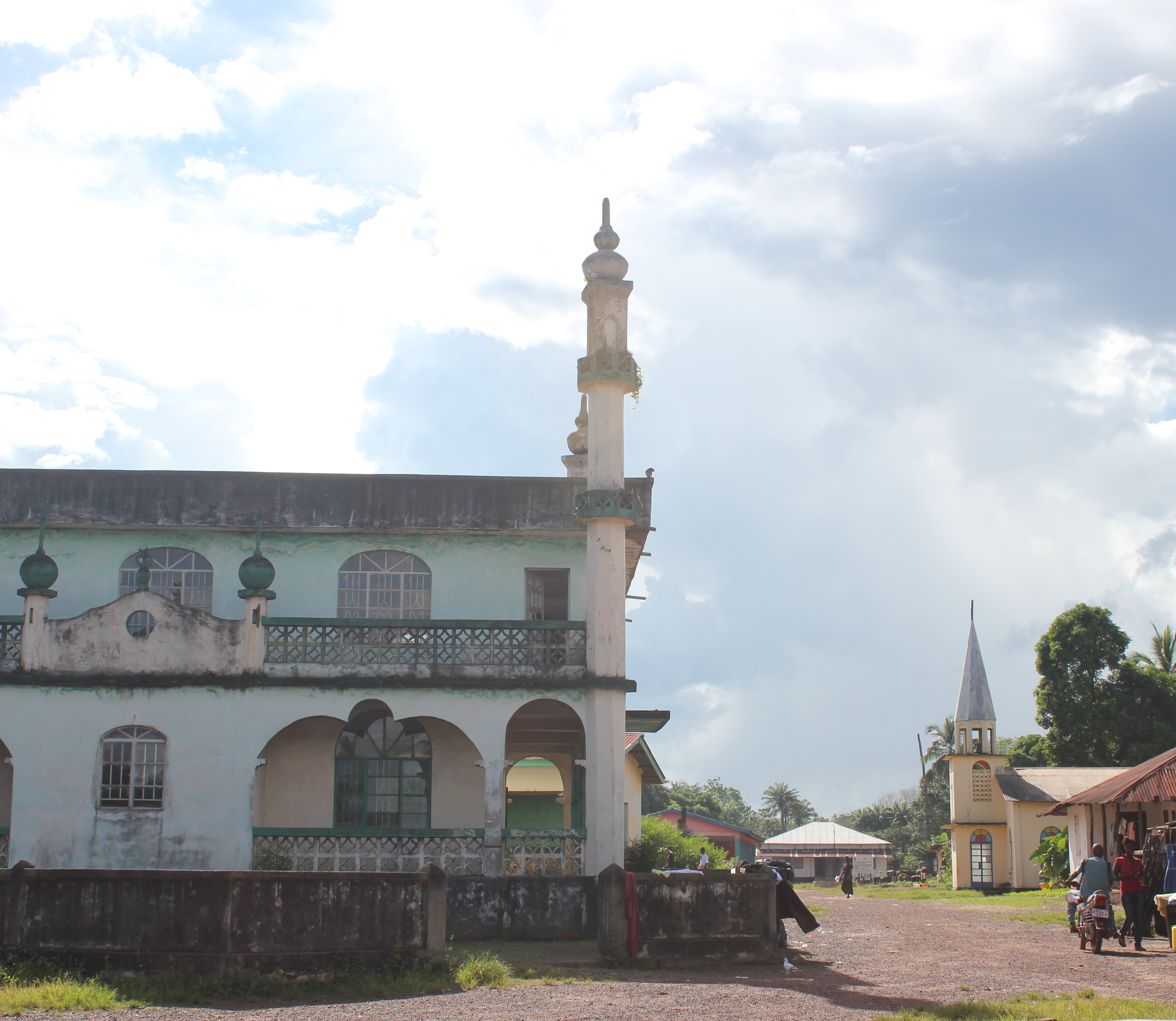
A mosque and a church in Sierra Leone

Sierra Leone is officially a secular state. Islam and Christianity are its two main religions. The constitution provides for freedom of religion and the government generally protects it. The government is constitutionally forbidden to establish a state religion, though Muslim and Christian prayers are usually held at the beginning of major political occasions.

Surveys of the religious makeup of Sierra Leone vary widely, though Muslims are the majority. Based on 2015 estimates, 77% of the population is Muslim, 22% is Christian, and 1% practise African traditional religion. According to 2020 estimates by the Pew Research Center 78.5% of Sierra Leone's population is Muslim (mostly Sunni), 20.4% is Christian (mostly Protestant), and 1.1% has a traditional African religion or other beliefs. The Inter-Religious Council of Sierra Leone estimated that 77% of Sierra Leone's population is Muslim, 21% is Christian, and 2% follows traditional African religions. Most of Sierra Leone's ethnic groups are Muslim majority, including the country's two largest ethnic groups: the Mende and Temne.

Sierra Leone is regarded as one of the most religiously tolerant countries in the world. Most of the major Muslim and Christian holidays are officially national holidays in the country, and religious conflict is rare.

The country is home to the Sierra Leone Inter-Religious Council, which is made up of both Christian and Muslim religious leaders to promote peace and tolerance throughout the country. The Islamic holidays of Eid al-Fitr, Eid al-Adha and Maulid-un-Nabi are observed as national holidays in Sierra Leone, as are the Christian holidays of Christmas, Boxing Day, Good Friday and Easter.

The overwhelming majority of Sierra Leonean Muslims are adherent to the Sunni tradition. Most of the mosques and Islamic schools across Sierra Leone are based on Sunni Islam. Ahmadiyya Muslims make up about 10% of the country's Muslim population; the southern city of Bo is home to a large Ahmadiyya Muslim population. There are five hundred Ahmadiyya mosques across Sierra Leone. Shia Islam does not have a strong presence in Sierra Leone, and there are virtually no Shia Muslims in the country. Most Sierra Leonean Muslims of the Sunni and Ahmadiyya sect generally pray together in the same mosque. The vast majority of Sierra Leonean Muslims are adherent to the Maliki school of Sunni Islam. Many Ahmadiyya Muslims in Sierra Leone also follow the Maliki Jurisprudence.

The Sierra Leone Islamic Supreme Council is the highest Islamic religious organisation in Sierra Leone and is made up of the country's Imams, Islamic scholars, and other Islamic clerics across the country. Sheikh Muhammad Taha Jalloh is the president of the Sierra Leone Supreme Islamic Council. The United Council of Imams is an influential Islamic religious body in Sierra Leone that is made up of all imams of mosques throughout Sierra Leone. The president of the United Council of Imam is Sheikh Alhaji Muhammad Habib Sheriff. The two largest mosques in Sierra Leone are the Freetown Central Mosque and the Ghadafi Central Mosque, both located in the capital Freetown.

The large majority of Sierra Leonean Christians are Protestant, of which the largest groups are the Wesleyan – Methodists. Other Christian Protestant denominations with significant presence in the country include Presbyterians, Baptists, Seventh-day Adventists, Anglicans, Lutherans, and Pentecostals. The Council of Churches is the Christian religious organisation that is made up of Protestant churches across Sierra Leone. Recently there has been an increase of Pentecostal churches, especially in Freetown.

Non-denominational Protestants form a significant minority of Sierra Leone's Christian population. Catholics are the largest group of non-Protestant Christians in Sierra Leone, forming about 8% of Sierra Leone's population and 26% of the Christian population in Sierra Leone. The Jehovah's Witnesses and the Church of Jesus Christ of Latter-day Saints are the two most prominent non-Trinitarian Christians in Sierra Leone, and they form a small but significant minority of the Christian population in Sierra Leone. A small community of Orthodox Christians resides in Freetown.

Other religions include Baha'is, Buddhists, Hindus, Jews and atheists.

=== Ethnic groups ===
The distribution of major ethnic groups within Sierra Leone

Ethnic groups of Sierra Leone
Temne	35.5%
Mende	33.2%
Limba	8.4%
Fula	3.8%
Kono	3.4%
Susu	2.9%
Loko	2.9%
Koranko	2.8%
Sherbro	2.6%
Mandingo	2.4%
Creole/Krio	1.3%

Sierra Leone is home to about sixteen ethnic groups, each with its own language. The largest and most influential are the Temne at about 35.5% and the Mende at about 33.2%. The Temne predominate in the Northern Sierra Leone and some areas around the capital of Sierra Leone. The Mende predominate in South-Eastern Sierra Leone (with the exception of Kono District).

The vast majority of Temne are Muslims at over 85%, with a significant Christian minority at about 10%. The Mende are also Muslim majority at about 70%, though with a large Christian minority at about 30%. Sierra Leone's national politics centres on the competition between the north-west, dominated by the Temne, and the south-east dominated by the Mende. The vast majority of the Mende support the Sierra Leone People's Party; while the majority of the Temne support the All People's Congress.

The Mende, who are believed to be descendants of the Mane, originally occupied the Liberian hinterland. They began moving into Sierra Leone slowly and peacefully in the eighteenth century.

The third-largest ethnic group is the Limba at about 8.4% of the population. It is believed that they have lived in Sierra Leone since before the European encounter. The Limba are primarily found in Northern Sierra Leone, particularly in Bombali, Kambia and Koinadugu District. The Limba are about 60% Christian and 40% Muslim. Since independence, the Limba have traditionally been influential in Sierra Leone's politics, along with the Mende.

One of the biggest minority ethnic groups are the Fula at around 3.8% of the population. Descendants of seventeenth- and eighteenth-century Fula migrant settlers from the Fouta Djalon region of Guinea, they live primarily in the northeast and the western area of Sierra Leone. The Fula are virtually all Muslims at over 99%.

The other ethnic groups are the Mandingo (also known as Mandinka). They are descendants of traders from Guinea who migrated to Sierra Leone during the late nineteenth to mid-twentieth centuries. The Mandinka are predominantly found in the east and the northern part of the country. They predominate in the large towns, most notably Karina, in Bombali District in the north; Kabala and Falaba in Koinadugu District in the north; and Yengema, Kono District in the east of the country. Like the Fula, the Mandinka are virtually all Muslims at over 99%.

Next in proportion are the Kono, who live primarily in Kono District in Eastern Sierra Leone. The Kono are descendants of migrants from Guinea; today their workers are known primarily as diamond miners. The majority of the Kono ethnic group are Christians, though with an influential Muslim minority.

The small but significant Creole or Krio people (descendants of freed African American, West Indian and Liberated African slaves who settled in Freetown between 1787 and about 1885) make up about 3% of the population. They primarily occupy the capital city of Freetown and its surrounding Western Area. The Creoles or Krio have traditionally dominated Sierra Leone's judiciary and Freetown's elected city council. One of the first ethnic groups to become educated according to Western traditions, they have traditionally been appointed to positions in the civil service, beginning during the colonial years. They continue to be influential in the civil service. The Creoles or Krios are virtually all Christians at about 99%.

The Oku people are the descendants of liberated Muslim Yorubas from Southwest Nigeria, who were resettled in Sierra Leone as Liberated Africans or came as settlers in the mid-19th century. The Oku people primarily reside in the communities of Fourah Bay, Fula Town, and Aberdeen in Freetown. The Oku are virtually all Muslims at about 99%.

Other minority ethnic groups are the Kuranko, who are related to the Mandingo and are largely Muslims. The Kuranko are believed to have begun arriving in Sierra Leone from Guinea in about 1600 and settled in the north, particularly in Koinadugu District. The Kuranko are primarily farmers; leaders among them have traditionally held several senior positions in the military. The Kuranko are largely Muslim majority.

The Loko in the north are native people of Sierra Leone, believed to have lived in Sierra Leone since the time of European encounter. Like the neighbouring Temne, the Loko are Muslim majority. The Susu and their related Yalunka are traders; both groups are primarily found in the far north in Kambia and Koinadugu District close to the border with Guinea. Both the Susu and Yalunka people are descendants of the Mande people. They are virtually all Muslims.

The Kissi live further inland in South-Eastern Sierra Leone. They predominate in the large town of Koindu and its surrounding areas in Kailahun District. The vast majority of Kissi are Christians. The much smaller Vai and Kru peoples are primarily found in Kailahun and Pujehun Districts near the border with Liberia. The Kru predominate in the Kroubay neighbourhood in the capital of Freetown. The Vai are largely Muslim majority at about 90%, while the Kru are virtually all Christians at over 99%.

On the coast in Bonthe District in the south are the Sherbro. Native to Sierra Leone, they have occupied Sherbro Island since it was founded. The Sherbro are primarily fisherman and farmers, and they are predominantly found in Bonthe District. The Sherbro are virtually all Christians, and their paramount chiefs had a history of intermarriage with British colonists and traders.

A small number of Sierra Leoneans are of partial or full Lebanese ancestry, descendants of traders who first came to the territory in the 19th century. They are locally known as Sierra Leonean-Lebanese. The Sierra Leonean-Lebanese community are primarily traders and they mostly live in middle-class households in the urban areas, primarily in Freetown, Bo, Kenema, Koidu Town and Makeni. Other non-Africans include 500 Indians and 2,000 Europeans.

=== Gender equality ===
Although women account for about 50 percent of the population in Sierra Leone, only 28 percent are household heads. As in the rest of the countries, education is a key factor in succeeding in aspects such as a well-paid job and covering the needs of a house. Rural areas are the most common to lack access to education having only male-headed four percent ahead of females with basic education and 1.2 percent more at the post-graduate level.

In Sierra Leone, normally, men are automatically positioned as household heads; and their status does not change if their marital status changes over time. However, a female household does change depending on their marital status. A woman can be the head of the house only if she remains single for the rest of her life. But if a woman gets married, she will not be entitled to be the head of the house anymore. Females can take over the household head if they become widowed or divorced.

In the labour field, it is expected that the household will financially provide for the needs of the family. However, females face gender discrimination making them the target of lower incomes and financial struggles. In numbers, females present a lower percentage (6.3) versus males (15.2) when it comes to being paid employees. Women face discrimination when it comes to obtaining financial, social, and cultural help to start a business.

=== Education ===
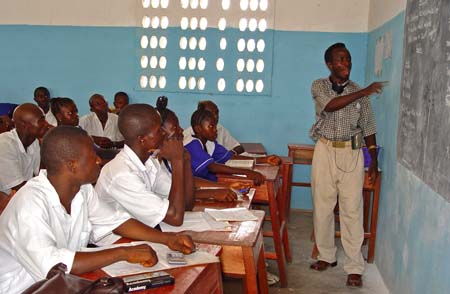
A secondary school class in Pendembu, Kailahun District

Education in Sierra Leone is legally required for all children for six years at primary level (Class P1-P6) and three years in junior secondary education, but a shortage of schools and teachers has made implementation impossible. Two thirds of the adult population are illiterate.

The Sierra Leone Civil War resulted in the destruction of 1,270 primary schools, and in 2001, 67% of all school-age children were out of school. The situation has improved considerably since then with primary school enrolment doubling between 2001 and 2005 and the reconstruction of many schools since the end of the war. Students at primary schools are usually 6 to 12 years old, and in secondary schools 13 to 18. Primary education is free and compulsory in government-sponsored public schools.

The country has three universities: Fourah Bay College, founded in 1827 (the oldest university in West Africa), University of Makeni (established initially in September 2005 as The Fatima Institute, the college was granted university status in August 2009, and assumed the name University of Makeni, or UNIMAK), and Njala University, which was established as the Njala Agricultural Experimental Station in 1910 and became a university in 2005. Teacher training colleges and religious seminaries are found in many parts of the country.

== Health ==
The CIA estimated that the average life expectancy in Sierra Leone was 57.39 years.

The prevalence of HIV/AIDS in the population is 1.6%, higher than the world average of 1% but lower than the average of 6.1% across Sub-Saharan Africa.

Medical care is not readily accessible, with doctors and hospitals out of reach for many villagers. While free health care may be provided in some villages, the medical staff are poorly paid and sometimes charge for their services, taking advantage of the fact that the villagers are not aware of their right to free medical care.

According to an Overseas Development Institute report, private health expenditure accounts for 85.7% of total spending on health.

=== Emergency medical response ===
Having had no formal emergency medical services previously, the First Responder Coalition of Sierra Leone (FRCSL) was formed in June 2019 in Makeni to facilitate the development of emergency first responder programmes nationwide. The founding members of the Coalition included the Sierra Leone Red Cross Society (the first chairing organisation), LFR International (proposed the formation), the University of Makeni, Agency for Rural Community Transformation, and the Holy Spirit Hospital. The establishment of the Coalition was concurrent with the declaration by the 72nd World Health Assembly that emergency care systems are essential to universal health coverage. Between June and July 2019, the FRCSL trained 1,000 community members from Makeni to be first responders and equipped each with a first aid kit.

=== Endemic and infectious diseases ===
Sierra Leone suffers from epidemic outbreaks of diseases, including yellow fever, cholera, Ebola, lassa fever and meningitis. Yellow fever and malaria are endemic to Sierra Leone.

=== Maternal and child health ===
According to 2017 estimates, Sierra Leone has the third highest maternal mortality rate in the world. For every 100 liveborn children, one mother dies due to complications of giving birth.

In the Multiple Indicator Cluster Survey (MICS) conducted by UNICEF in 2012, the prevalence of female genital mutilation in Sierra Leone was 94%. As of 2014, Sierra Leone was estimated as having the 11th highest infant mortality rate in the world.

One of the consequences women in Sierra Leone face after a prolonged and obstructed labour that would have required a c-section is obstetric fistula. This condition often drives women into poverty and isolation.

The AWC- Aberdeen Women's Centre in Freetown, the second busiest hospital in Sierra Leone, delivers up to 3000 babies each year. The centre provides a variety of maternal and child health services and is supported by not-for-profit organisations.

=== Mental health ===
Mental healthcare in Sierra Leone is almost non-existent. Many sufferers try to cure themselves with the help of traditional healers. During the Civil War (1991–2002), many soldiers took part in atrocities and many children were forced to fight. This left them traumatised, with an estimated 400,000 people (by 2009) being mentally ill. Thousands of former child soldiers have fallen into substance abuse.

=== Potable water supply ===
The water supply in Sierra Leone is characterised by limited access to safe drinking water. Despite efforts by the government and numerous non-governmental organisations, access has not much improved since the end of the Sierra Leone Civil War in 2002, stagnating at about 50% and even declining in rural areas. It is hoped that a new dam in Orugu, for which China committed financing in 2009, will alleviate water scarcity.

According to a national survey carried out in 2006, 84% of the urban population and 32% of the rural population had access to an improved water source. Those with access in rural areas were served almost exclusively by protected wells. Only 20% of the urban population and 1% of the rural population had access to piped drinking water in their home. Compared to the 2000 survey access has increased in urban areas, but has declined in rural areas, possibly because facilities have broken down because of a lack of maintenance.

With a new decentralisation policy, embodied in the Local Government Act of 2004, responsibility for water supply in areas outside the capital was passed from the central government to local councils. In Freetown, the Guma Valley Water Company remains in charge of the water supply.

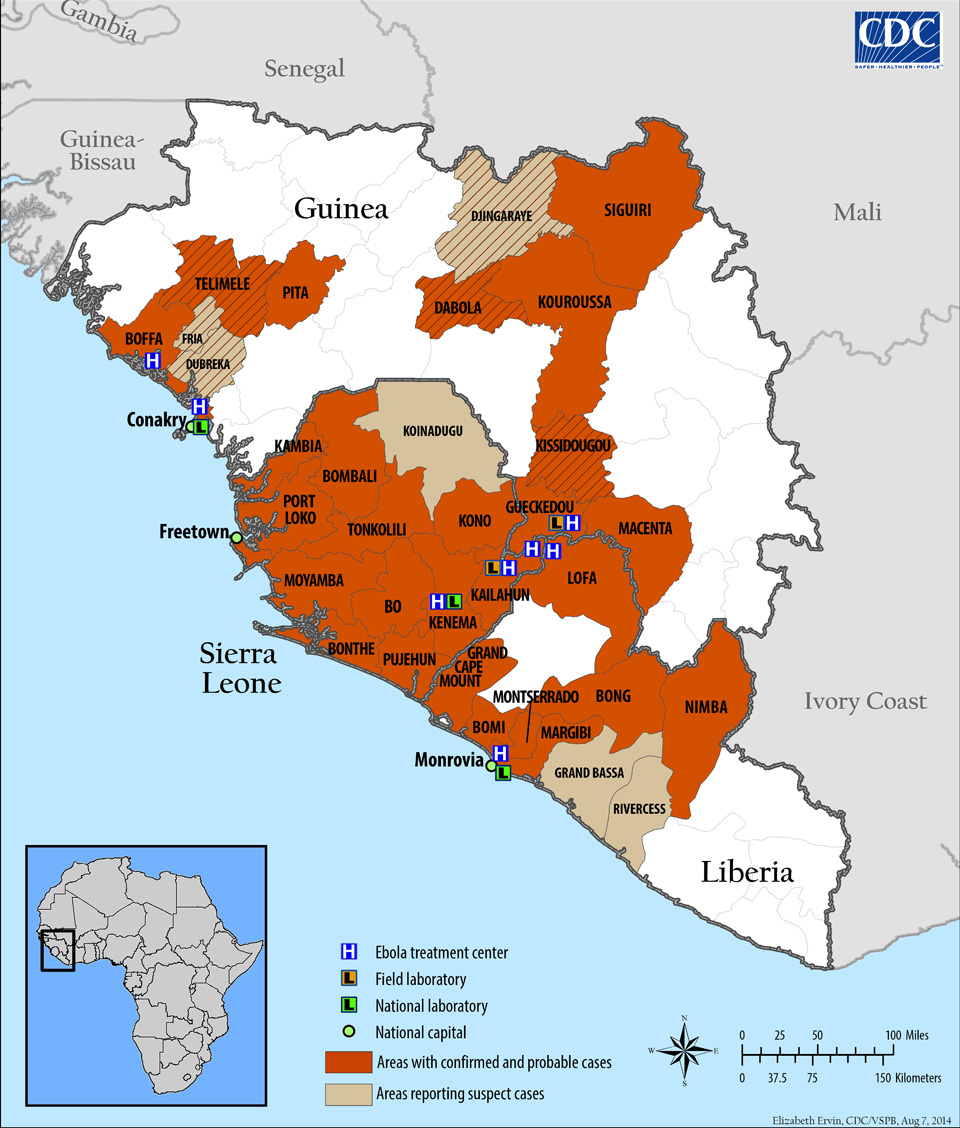
A situation map of the Ebola outbreak as of 8 August 2014

=== 2014 Ebola outbreak ===
In 2014 there was an outbreak of the Ebola virus in West Africa. As of 19 October 2014, there had been 3,706 cases of Ebola in Sierra Leone, and 1,259 deaths, including that of the leading physician trying to control the outbreak, Sheik Umar Khan. Aside from the human cost, the outbreak was severely eroding the economy. By September 2014, with the closure of borders, the cancellation of airline flights, the evacuation of foreign workers and a collapse of cross-border trade, the national deficit of Sierra Leone and other affected countries was widening to the point where the IMF was considering expanding its financial support.

== Culture ==
=== Polygamy ===
As of 2019, 30% of women and 14% of men were in a polygamous unions in Sierra Leone. "The percentage of women with one or more co-wives has decreased gradually over time, from 37% in 2008 and 35% in 2013 to 30% in 2019."

=== Food and customs ===
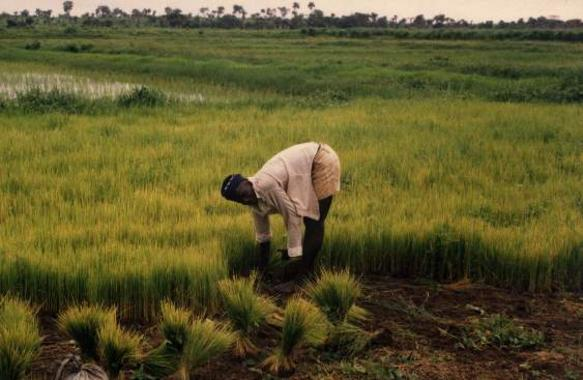
Rice farming in Rolako

Rice is the staple food of Sierra Leone and is consumed at virtually every meal. The rice is prepared in numerous ways, and topped with a variety of sauces made from some of Sierra Leone's favourite toppings, including potato leaves, cassava leaves, crain crain, okra soup, fried fish and groundnut stew.

Along the streets of towns and cities across Sierra Leone, one can find foods consisting of fruit, vegetables and snacks such as fresh mangoes, oranges, pineapple, fried plantains, ginger beer, fried potato, fried cassava with pepper sauce; bags of popcorn or peanuts, bread, roasted corn, or skewers of grilled meat or shrimp.

Poyo is a popular Sierra Leonean drink. It is a sweet, lightly fermented palm wine.

=== Media ===
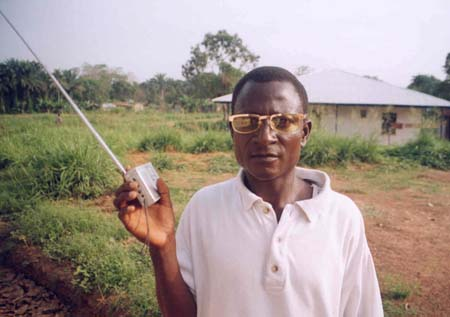
A radio listener in Kailahun

Media in Sierra Leone began with the introduction of the first printing press in Africa at the start of the 19th century. A strong free journalistic tradition developed with the creation of several newspapers. In the 1860s, the country became a journalist hub for Africa. At the end of the 19th century, the industry went into decline, and when radio was introduced in the 1930s, it became the primary communication medium in the country.

The Sierra Leone Broadcasting Service (SLBS) was created by the colonial government in 1934 making it the earliest English-language radio broadcaster service in West Africa. The service began broadcasting television in 1963, with coverage extended to all the districts in the country in 1978. In April 2010, the SLBS merged with the United Nations peacekeeping radio station in Sierra Leone to form the Sierra Leone Broadcasting Corporation, the government-owned current national broadcaster in Sierra Leone.

The Sierra Leone constitution guarantees freedom of speech, and freedom of the press; however, the government maintains strong control of media, and at times restricts these rights in practice. Some subjects are seen as taboo by society and members of the political elite; imprisonment and violence have been used by the political establishment against journalists.

Under legislation enacted in 1980, all newspapers must register with the Ministry of Information and pay sizeable registration fees. The Criminal Libel Law, including Seditious Libel Law of 1965, is used to control what is published in the media.

In 2006, President Ahmad Tejan Kabbah committed to reforming the laws governing the press and media to create a freer system for journalists to work in. As of 2013 Sierra Leone is ranked 61st (up two slots from 63rd in 2012) out of 179 countries on Reporters Without Borders' Press Freedom Index.

Print media is not widely read in Sierra Leone, especially outside Freetown and other major cities, partially due to the low levels of literacy in the country. In 2007 there were 15 daily newspapers in the country, as well as those published weekly. The majority of newspapers are privately run and are often critical of the government. The standard of print journalism tends to be low owing to lack of training, and people trust the information published in newspapers less than that found on the radio.

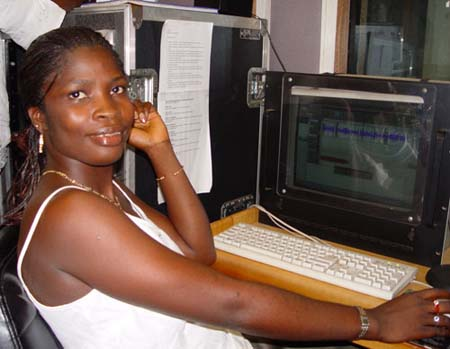
Isata Mahoi shown editing radio programmes in Talking Drum studio Freetown; she is also an actress in the Sierra Leone radio soap opera Atunda Ayenda

Radio is the most popular and most-trusted media in Sierra Leone, with 85% of people having access to a radio and 72% of people in the country listening to the radio daily. These levels do vary between areas of the country, with the Western Area having the highest levels and Kailahun the lowest. Stations mainly consist of local commercial stations with a limited broadcast range, combined with a few stations with national coverage – Capital Radio Sierra Leone being the largest of the commercial stations.

The United Nations Mission in Sierra Leone (UNIOSIL) ran one of the most popular stations in the country, broadcasting programmes in a range of languages. The UN mission was restructured in 2008 and it was decided that the UN Radio would be merged with SLBS to form the new Sierra Leone Broadcasting Corporation (SLBC). This merger eventually happened in 2011 after the necessary legislation was enacted. SLBC transmits radio on FM and has two television services, one of which is uplinked by satellite for international consumption. FM relays of the BBC World Service (in Freetown, Bo, Kenema and Makeni) and Radio France Internationale (Freetown only) are also broadcast.

Outside the capital Freetown and other major cities, television is not watched by a great many people, although Bo, Kenema and Makeni are served by their own relays of the main SLBC service. There are three free terrestrial television stations in Sierra Leone, one run by the government SLBC and the other two are private stations in Freetown, Star TV which is run by the owner of the Standard-Times newspaper and AYV – Africa Young Voices. Several religious funded TV stations operate intermittently. In 2007, a pay-per-view service was also introduced by GTV as part of a pan-African television service in addition to the nine-year-old sub-Saharan Digital satellite television service (DStv) originating from Multichoice Africa in South Africa. GTV subsequently went out of business, leaving DStv as the only provider of subscription satellite television in the country. ITV and SATCON are currently operational.

Internet access in Sierra Leone has been sparse but is on the increase, especially since the introduction of 3G/4G cellular phone services across the country. There are several main internet service providers (ISPs) operating in the country. Problems experienced with access to the Internet include an intermittent electricity supply and a slow connection speed in the country outside Freetown.

=== Arts ===
The arts in Sierra Leone are a mixture of tradition and hybrid African and western styles.

In 1963 the Sierra Leonean National Dance Troupe was created by John Akar in order to showcase Sierra Leone's national cultural heritage.

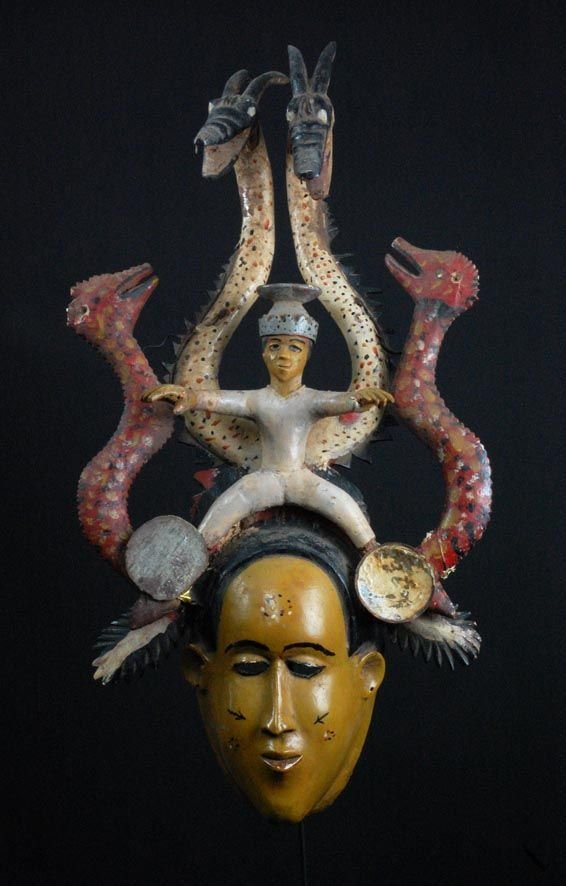
Odelay mask by Temne people. Brooklyn Museum.

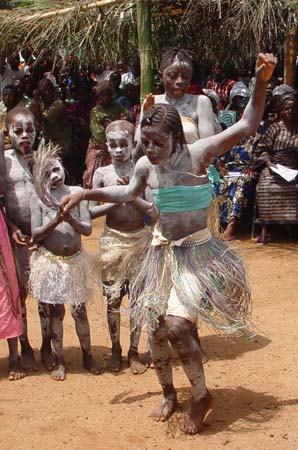
The Koindu dance

=== Sports ===
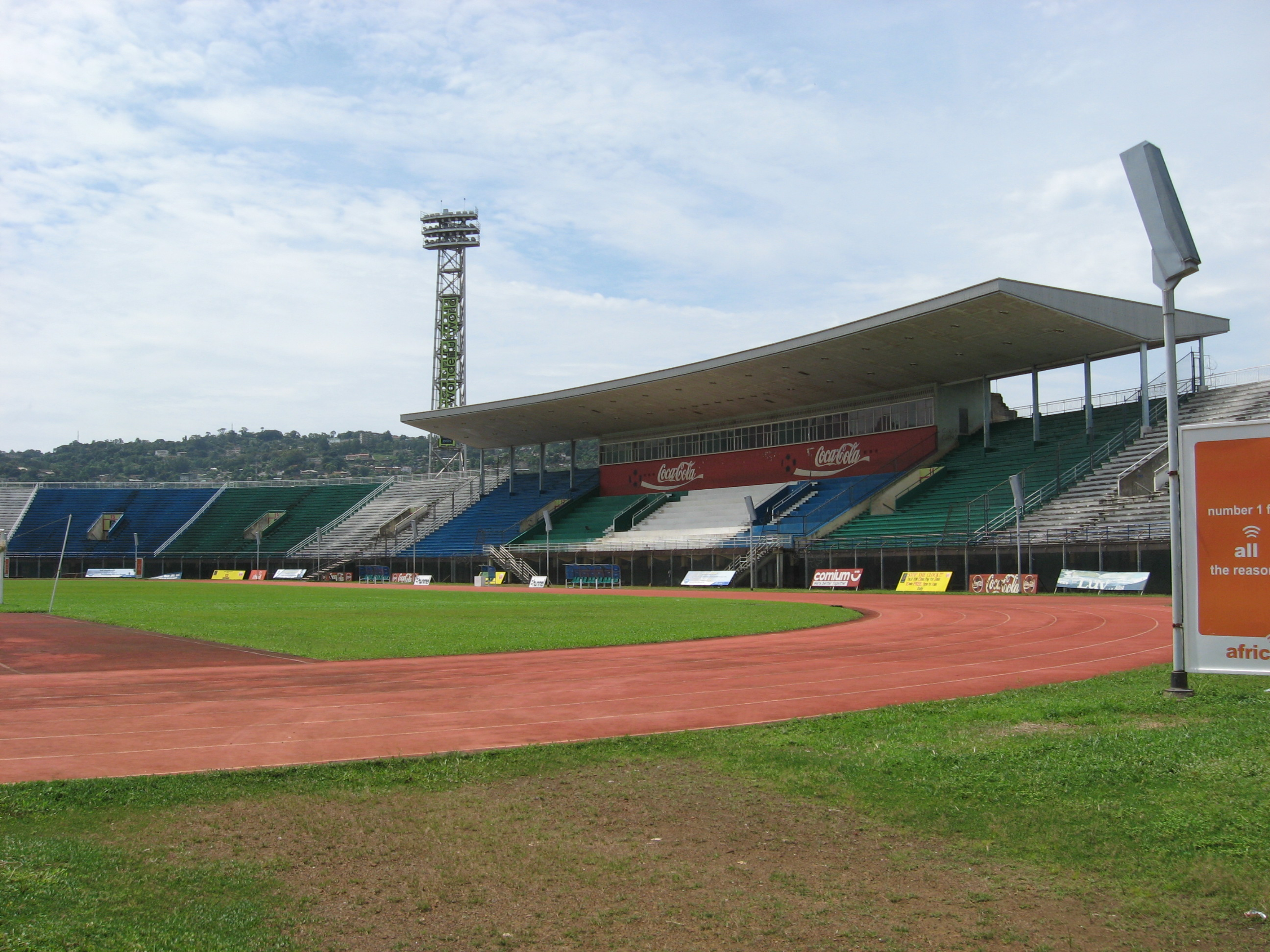
National Stadium in Freetown

Association football is by far the most popular sport in Sierra Leone. Children, youth and adult are frequently seen playing street football across Sierra Leone. There are organised youth and adult football tournaments across the country, and there are various primary and secondary schools with football teams across Sierra Leone.

The Sierra Leone national football team, popularly known as the Leone Stars, represents the country in international competitions. It has never qualified for the FIFA World Cup but participated in the 1994 and 1996 African Cup of Nations. When the national football team, the Leone Stars, have a match, Sierra Leoneans across the country come together united in support of the national team.

Many of the Sierra Leone national team footballers play for teams based in Europe although virtually all of them started professional football in the Sierra Leone National Premier League. Many of the national team footballers are celebrities across Sierra Leone and they are often well known by the general population. Some of Sierra Leonean international footballers include Mohamed Kallon, Mohamed Bangura, Rodney Strasser, Kei Kamara, Ibrahim Teteh Bangura, Mustapha Dumbuya, Christian Caulker, Alhassan Bangura, Sheriff Suma, Osman Kakay, Medo Kamara, Umaru Bangura and Julius Gibrilla Woobay.

The Sierra Leone National Premier League is the top professional football league in Sierra Leone and is controlled by the Sierra Leone Football Association. Fourteen clubs from across the country compete in the Sierra Leone Premier League. The two biggest and most successful football clubs are East End Lions and Mighty Blackpool. East End Lions and Mighty Blackpool have an intense rivalry and when they play each other the national stadium in Freetown is often sold out and supporters of both clubs often clash with each other before and after the game.

Many Sierra Leonean youth, children and adults follow the major football leagues in Europe, particularly the English Premier League, Italian Serie A, Spanish La Liga, German Bundesliga and French Ligue 1.

The Sierra Leone cricket team represents Sierra Leone in international cricket competitions and is among the best in West Africa. It became an affiliate member of the International Cricket Council in 2002. It made its international debut at the 2004 African Affiliates Championship, where it finished last of eight teams. But at the equivalent tournament in 2006, Division Three of the African region of the World Cricket League, it finished as runner-up to Mozambique, and just missed promotion to Division Two.

In 2009, the Sierra Leone Under-19 team finished second in the African Under-19 Championship in Zambia, thus qualifying for the Under-19 World Cup qualifying tournament. However, the team was unable to obtain visas to play in the tournament.

Sierra Leone is the first African country to join the International Floorball Federation.

== Tourism ==
Sierra Leone's Freetown is a favourite destination for tourists. Although the sector was seriously affected during the Civil War, there has been a steady improvement in recent years. There is a vast expanse of beaches stretching along the Freetown Peninsula. The Tacugama Chimpanzee Sanctuary, which is located within the peninsula's vast rainforest reserve, just a few kilometres from the centre of Freetown, has a collection of rare and endangered chimpanzees. Other popular destinations for tourists include the Freetown Cotton Tree, located in Central Freetown, a significant national monument and integral to the founding of the city; Bunce Island, which is a boat ride from the city, is home to the ruins of the slave fortress that was used during the Transatlantic slave trade; the Sierra Leone Museum, which has a collection of both precolonial as well as colonial artefacts and other items of historical significance; the National Railway Museum; and the city's coastline, via the popular Sea Coach Express.

=== Visitors and revenue ===
- 117.000 international tourists in 2024
- >100 million USD tourism revenue in 2024
- 49.600 jobs in tourism

=== Potential ===
Sierra Leone has the potential to grow into a major tourism power in West Africa; this is due, among other things, to its beaches, nature, and heritage.

According to the World Bank, Sierra Leone could double its tourism revenue in 10 years.

== See also ==
- Outline of Sierra Leone
