= Loko Masama Chiefdom =

- Chiefdom
- Country: Sierra Leone
- Province: Northern Province
- District: Port Loko District
- Capital: Petifu
- Time zone: UTC+0 (GMT)

Loko Masama Chiefdom is a chiefdom in the Port Loko District of Sierra Leone. Its capital is Petifu.
