= Walia, Sierra Leone =

- Location in Sierra Leone
- Coordinates: 8°37′N 11°10′W
- Country: Sierra Leone
- Province: Northern Province
- District: Falaba District
- Time zone: UTC-5 (GMT)

Walia is a rural remote village in Mongo Chiefdom, Falaba District in the Northern Province of Sierra Leone. Walia is located at the international border with the Republic of Guinea. The main economic activity in Walia is farming. The village of Walia is extremely remote and there is no accessible road transport by vehicle to Walia village.

The Yalunka is the main ethnic group in Yalia. The residents of Walia are virtually all Muslims, and Islam is dominant in the village.
