= Chiefdoms of Sierra Leone =

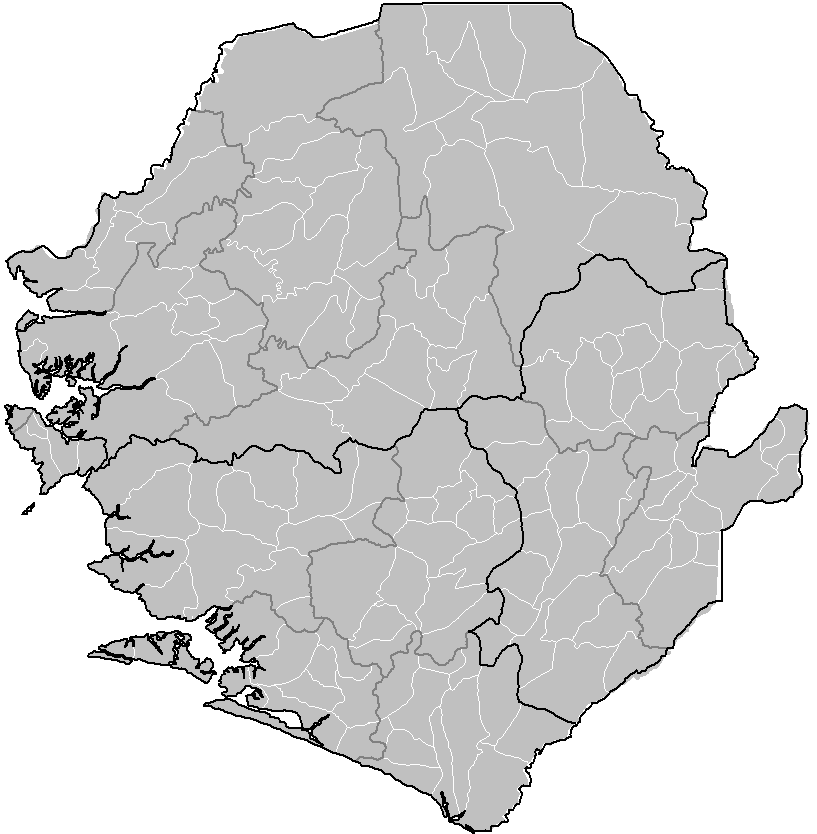
Former 149 chiefdoms of Sierra Leone, before 2017

The chiefdoms of Sierra Leone are the third-level units of administration in Sierra Leone. There are 190 chiefdoms in Sierra Leone, as of 2017. Previously, there were 149.

== History and organisation ==
The paramount chiefs and the ruling families in the chiefdoms were recognised and empowered by the British colonial administration when it organised the Protectorate of Sierra Leone in 1896. Typically, chiefs have the power to "raise taxes, control the judicial system, and allocate land, the most important resource in rural areas."

The hereditary paramount chiefs and their sub-chiefs were the sole local government in Sierra Leone until 2004, when the World Bank sponsored the creation of elected local councils. Local notables, known as the Tribal Authority, elect paramount chiefs for life from among the ruling families in each chieftaincy recognised by the British administration in 1896.

Some chieftaincies have several ruling families, and the differences among them in terms of economic progress has been subject to study in 2013. They found there was a positive relationship between the number of ruling families in a chieftaincy and educational, health and economic outcomes in terms of human capital.

The districts of Sierra Leone were divided into 149 chiefdoms of chieftaincies until 2017, as listed below as of 2011. Since 2017, they have been divided into 190 chiefdoms.

== Pre-2017 Chiefdoms ==
=== Eastern Province ===
==== Kailahun District ====
1. Dea – Baiwala
2. Jaluahun – Segbwema
3. Jawei – Daru
4. Kissi Kama – Dea
5. Kissi Teng – Kangama
6. Kissi Tongi – Buedu
7. Luawa – Kailahun
8. Malema – Jojoima
9. Mandu – Mobai
10. Peje Bongre – Manowa
11. Peje West – Bunumbu
12. Penguia – Sandar
13. Upper Bambara – Pendembu
14. Yawei – Bandajuma

==== Kenema District ====
1. Dama – Giema
2. Dodo – Dodo
3. Gaura – Joru
4. Gorama Mende – Tungie
5. Kandu Leppiam – Gbado
6. Koya – Baoma
7. Langurama Ya – Baima
8. Lower Bambara – Panguma
9. Malehgohun – Sembehun
10. Niawa – Sundumei
11. Nomo – Faama
12. Nongowa – Kenema
13. Simbaru – Boajibu
14. Small Bo – Blama
15. Tunkia – Gorahun
16. Wandor – Faala

==== Kono District ====
1. Fiama – Njagbwema
2. Gbane Kandor – Koardu
3. Gbane – Ngandorhun
4. Gbense – Yardu
5. Gorama Kono – Kangama
6. Kamara – Tombodu
7. Lei – Siama
8. Mafindor – Kamiendor
9. Nimikoro – Njaiama
10. Nimiyama – Sewafe
11. Sandor – Kayima
12. Soa – Kainkordu
13. Tankoro – New Sembehun
14. Toli – Kondewakor

=== Northern Province ===
==== Bombali District ====
1. Biriwa – Kamabai
2. Bombali Shebora – Makeni
3. Gbanti Kamaranka – Kamaranka
4. Gbendembu Ngowahun – Kalangba
5. Libeisaygahun – Batkanu
6. Magbaiamba Ndowahun – Hunduwa
7. Makari Gbanti – Masongbon
8. Paki Massabong – Mapaki
9. Safroko Limba – Binkolo
10. Sanda Loko – Kamalo
11. Sanda Tenraren – Mateboi
12. Sella Limba – Kamakwie
13. Tambakha – Fintonia

==== Koinadugu District ====
1. Dembelia Sikunia – Sikunia
2. Diang – Kondembaia
3. Folasaba – Musaia
4. Kasunko – Fadugu
5. Mongo – Bendugu
6. Neya – Krubola
7. Nieni – Yiffin
8. Sengbe – Yogomaia
9. Sulima – Falaba
10. Wara-Wara Bafodia – Bafodea
11. Wara-Wara Yagala – Gbawuria

==== Tonkolili District ====
1. Gbonkolenken – Yele
2. Kafe Simiria – Mabonto
3. Kalanthuba – Kamankay
4. Dansogoia - Bumbuna
5. Kholifa Mabang - Mabang
6. Kholifa Rowalla – Magburaka
7. Kunike – Masingbi
8. Kunike Barina – Makali
9. Malal Mara – Rochin
10. Sambaia – Bendugu
11. Tane – Matotoka
12. Yoni – Yonibana

=== North Western Province ===
==== Kambia District ====
1. Brimaia – Kukuna
2. Gbinle Dixing – Tawuya
3. Magbema – Kambia
4. Mambolo – Mambolo
5. Masungbala – Kawula
6. Samu – Kychum
7. Tonko Limba – Madina

==== Port Loko District ====
1. Bureh – Mange
2. Buya Romende – Foredugu
3. Debia – Gbinti
4. Kaffu Bullom – Mahera
5. Kasseh – Mahera
6. Koya – Songo
7. Loko Masama – Petifu
8. Maconteh – Unknown
9. Maforki – Port Loko
10. Marampa – Lunsar
11. Masimera – Masimera
12. Sanda Magbolontor – Sendugu
13. T.M. Safroko – Miraykulay

=== Southern Province ===
==== Bo District ====
1. Badjia – Ngelehun
2. Bagbo – Jimmi
3. Bagbwe – Ngarlu
4. Baoma – Baoma
5. Bumpe–Gao – Bumpe
6. Gbo – Gbo
7. Jaiama Bongor – Telu
8. Kakua – Bo town
9. Komboya – Njala
10. Lugbu – Sumbuya
11. Niawa Lenga – Nengbema
12. Selenga – Dambala
13. Tikonko – Tikonko
14. Valunia – Mongere
15. Wonde – Gboyama

==== Bonthe District ====
1. Bendu – Cha Bendu
2. Bum – Madina
3. Dema – Tissana
4. Imperri – Gbangbama
5. Jong – Mattru
6. Kpanda – Kemo Motuo
7. Kwamebai Krim – Benduma
8. Nongoba Bullom – Bullom
9. Sittia – Yonni
10. Sogbini – Tihun
11. Yawbeko – Talia

==== Moyamba District ====
1. Bagruwa – Sembehun
2. Bumpe – Rotifunk
3. Dasse – Mano
4. Fakunya – Gandohun
5. Kagboro – Shenge
6. Kaiyamba – Moyamba
7. Kamajei – Senehun
8. Kongbora – Bauya
9. Kori – Taiama
10. Kowa – Njama
11. Lower Banta – Gbangbatoke
12. Ribbi – Bradford
13. Timdale – Bomotoke
14. Upper Banta – Mokelle

==== Pujehun District ====
1. Barri – Potoru
2. Gallines Perri – Blama
3. Kpaka – Masam
4. Kpanga Kabonde – Pujehun town
5. Makpele – Zimmi
6. Malen – Sahn
7. Mano Sa Krim – Gbonjema
8. Kpanga Krim – Gobaru
9. Peje – Futta
10. Sorogbema – Fairo
11. Sowa – Bandajuma
12. Yakemo Kpukumu Krim – Karlu

== Post-2017 Chiefdoms ==
=== Eastern Province ===
==== Kailahun District ====
1. Dea – Baiwala
2. Jahn (Note: Formerly part of Jaluahun Chiefdom.) – ?
3. Jaluahun – Segbwema
4. Jawei – Daru
5. Kissi Kama – Dea
6. Kissi Teng – Kangama
7. Kissi Tongi – Buedu
8. Luawa – Kailahun
9. Malema – Jojoima
10. Mandu – Mobai
11. Peje Bongre – Manowa
12. Peje West – Bunumbu
13. Penguia – Sandar
14. Upper Bambara – Pendembu
15. Yawei – Bandajuma

==== Kenema District ====
1. Dama – Giema
2. Dodo – Dodo
3. Gaura – Joru
4. Gorama Mende – Tungie
5. Kandu Leppiam – Gbado
6. Koya – Baoma
7. Langurama Ya – Baima
8. Lower Bambara – Panguma
9. Malegohun – Sembehun
10. Niawa – Sundumei
11. Nomo – Faama
12. Nongowa – ?
13. Simbaru – Boajibu
14. Small Bo – Blama
15. Tunkia – Gorahun
16. Wando – Faala
17. Kenema City (Note: Formerly part of Nongowa Chiefdom.) – Kenema

==== Kono District ====
1. Fiama – Njagbwema
2. Gbane Kandor – Koardu
3. Gbane – Ngandorhun
4. Gbense – Yardu
5. Gorama Kono – Kangama
6. Kamara – Tombodu
7. Lei – Siama
8. Mafindor – Kamiendor
9. Nimikoro – Njaiama
10. Nimiyama – Sewafe
11. Sandor – Kayima
12. Soa – Kainkordu
13. Tankoro – Bayama Tankoo
14. Toli – Kondewakor
15. Koidu Town (Note: Formerly part of Gbense Chiefdom.) – Koidu

=== Northern Province ===
==== Bombali District ====
1. Biriwa – Kamabai
2. Bombali Shebora – ?
3. Bombali Siari (Note: Formerly part of Bombali Shebora Chiefdom.) – ?
4. Gbanti (Note: Formerly part of Makari Gbanti Chiefdom; split off.) – ?
5. Gbendembu (Note: Formerly part of Gbendembu Ngowahun Chiefdom; split off.) – ?
6. Kamaranka (Note: Formerly part of Gbanti Kamaranka Chiefdom; split off, with Gbanti Chiefdom moving to Karene District.) – Kamaranka
7. Magbaiamba Ndowahun – Hunduwa
8. Makari – Masongbon
9. Mara (Note: Formerly part of Malal Mara Chiefdom; moved from Tonkolili District.) – ?
10. Ngowahun – Kalangba
11. Paki Massabong – Mapaki
12. Safroko Limba – Binkolo
13. Makeni City – Makeni

==== Falaba District ====
1. Delemandugu (Note: Formerly part of Mongo Chiefdom.) – ?
2. Dembelia (Note: Formerly part of Folasaba Chiefdom.) – Musaia
3. Dembelia Sikunia – Sikunia
4. Folasaba – ?
5. Kamadu Yiraia (Note: Formerly part of Sengbe Chiefdom from Koinadugu District before splitting off.) – ?
6. Kebelia (Note: Formerly part of Sulima Chiefdom.) – ?
7. Kulor Saradu (Note: Formerly part of Neya Chiefdom.) – ?
8. Mongo – Bendugu
9. Morfindugu – ?
10. Neya – Krubola
11. Nyedu – ?
12. Sulima – Falaba
13. Wollay Barawa (Note: Formerly part of Nieni Chiefdom from Koinadugu District before splitting off.) – ?

==== Koinadugu District ====
1. Diang – Kondembaia
2. Gbonkobon Kayaka (Note: Formerly part of Kasunko Chiefdom; split off.) – ?
3. Kalian (Note: Formerly part of Nieni Chiefdom.) – ?
4. Kamukeh (Note: Formerly part of Wara-Wara Bafodea Chiefdom.) – ?
5. Kasunko KaKellian – ?
6. Nieni (Note: Lost area to Wollay Barawa Chiefdom; which moved to Falaba District.) – Yiffin
7. Sengbe (Note: Lost area to Kamadu Yirala Chiefdom; which moved to Falaba District.) – Yogomaia
8. Tamiso – Fadugu
9. Wara-Wara Bafodia – Bafodia
10. Wara-Wara Yagala – Gbawuria

==== Tonkolili District ====
1. Dansogoia (Note: Formerly part of Kalansongoia Chiefdom; split off.) – Bumbuna
2. Gbonkolenken Masankong – Yele
3. Kafe (Note: Formerly part of Kafe Simiria Chiefdom.) – ?
4. Kalanthuba – ?
5. Kholifa Mabang – Mabang
6. Kholifa Mamuntha Mayosso (Note: Formerly part of Kholifa Rowalla Chiefdom.) – ?
7. Kholifa Rowalla – Magburaka
8. Kunike Barina – Makali
9. Kunike Folawusu (Note: Formerly part of Kunike Sanda Chiefdom.) – ?
10. Kunike Sanda – Masingbi
11. Malal (Note: Formerly part of Malal Mara Chiefdom before losing the Mara section.) – Rochin
12. Mayeppoh (Note: Formerly part of Gbonkolenken Chiefdom) – ?
13. Poli – ?
14. Sambaia – Bendugu
15. Simiria – Mabonto
16. Tane – Matotoka
17. Yele – ?
18. Yoni Mabanta (Note: Formerly part of Yoni Chiefdom; split off.) – ?
19. Yoni Mamaila – Yonibana

=== North Western Province ===
==== Kambia District ====
1. Briama – Kukuna
2. Dixing (Note: Formerly part of Gbinle Dixing Chiefdom; split off.) – Mafaray
3. Gbinle – Tawuya
4. Khonimakha (Note: Formerly part of Briama Chiefdom.) – Kabaya
5. Magbema – Kambia
6. Mambolo – Mambolo
7. Masungbala – Kawula
8. Munu Thala (Note: Formerly part of Masungbala Chiefdom.) – Thala
9. Samu – Kychum
10. Tonko Limba – Madina

==== Karene District ====
1. Buya (Note: Formerly part of Buya Romende Chiefdom; split off.) – ?
2. Debia – Gbinti
3. Gbanti (Note: Formerly part of Gbanti Kamaranka Chiefdom from Bombali District before splitting off.) – ?
4. Libeisaygahun-Gbombahun – Batkanu
5. Mafonda Makerembay (Note: Formerly part of Libeisaygahun-Gbombahun Chiefdom.) – ?
6. Romende – Foredugu
7. Safroko (Note: Formerly part of Debia Chiefdom.) – ?
8. Sanda Loko – Kamalo
9. Sanda Magbolontor – Sendugu
10. Sanda Tenraren – Mateboi
11. Sella Limba – Kamakwie
12. Tambakha Simibungie (Note: Formerly part of Tambakha Chiefdom; split off.) – ?
13. Tambakha Yobangie – Fintonia

==== Port Loko District ====
1. Bakeh Loko (Note: Formerly part of Maforki Chiefdom.) – ?
2. Bureh (Note: Formerly part of Bureh Kaseh Chiefdom; split off.) – Mange
3. Kaffu Bullom – Mahera
4. Kamasondo (Note: Formerly part of Loko Massama Chiefdom.) – ?
5. Kaseh – ?
6. Koya – Songo
7. Loko Massama – Petifu
8. Maconteh – ?
9. Maforki – ?
10. Makama (Note: Formerly part of T.M. Safroko Chiefdom; split off.) – Miraykulay
11. Marampa – Lunsar
12. Masimera – Masimera
13. Tinkatopa – ?
14. Port Loko City – Port Loko

=== Southern Province ===
==== Bo District ====
1. Badjia – Ngelehun
2. Bagbo – Jimmi
3. Bagbwe – Ngarlu
4. Baoma – Baoma
5. Bongor (Note: Formerly part of Jaiama Bongor Chiefdom; split off.) – Telu
6. Bumpe–Gao – Bumpe
7. Gbo – Gbo
8. Jaiama – ?
9. Kakua – Kakua
10. Komboya – Njala
11. Lugbu – Sumbuya
12. Niawa Lenga – Nengbema
13. Selenga – Dambala
14. Tikonko – Tikonko
15. Valunia – Mongere
16. Wonde – Gboyama
17. Bo City (Note: Formerly part of Kakua Chiefdom.) – Bo

==== Bonthe District ====
1. Bendu – Cha Bendu
2. Bum – Madina
3. Dema – Tissana
4. Imperri – Gbangbama
5. Jong – Mattru
6. Kpanda Kemo – Kemo Motuo
7. Kwamebai Krim – Benduma
8. Nongoba Bullom – Bullom
9. Sittia – Yonni
10. Sogbini – Tihun
11. Yawbeko – Talia
12. Bonthe Urban (Note: Formerly part of Sittia Chiefdom.) – Bonthe

==== Moyamba District ====
1. Bagruwa – Sembehun
2. Bumpe – Rotifunk
3. Dasse – Mano
4. Fakunya – Gandohun
5. Kagboro – Shenge
6. Kaiyamba – Moyamba
7. Kamajei – Senehun
8. Kongbora – Bauya
9. Kori – Taiama
10. Kowa – Njama
11. Lower Banta – Gbangbatoke
12. Ribbi – Bradford
13. Timdale – Bomotoke
14. Upper Banta – Mokelle

==== Pujehun District ====
1. Barri – Potoru
2. Gallines (Note: Formerly part of Gallines Perri Chiefdom; split off.) – ?
3. Kagonde (Note: Formerly part of Kpanga Kagonde Chiefdom; split off.) – ?
4. Kpaka – Masam
5. Kpanga – Pujehun
6. Makpele – Zimmi
7. Malen – Sahn
8. Mano Sakrim – Gbonjema
9. Panga Krim – Gobaru
10. Peje – Futta
11. Perri – Blama
12. Soro Gbema – Fairo
13. Sowa – Bandajuma
14. Yekomo Kpukumu – Karlu

== See also ==
- Administrative divisions of Sierra Leone
