= Alikalia =

- Nickname: Kuranko London
- Location in Sierra Leone
- Coordinates: 9°10′N 11°24′W
- Country: Sierra Leone
- Province: Northern Province
- District: Koinadugu District
- Chiefdom: Nieni Chiefdom

Government
  - Current Honorable: Daniel Koroma

Population (2009)
  - Total: 3,254
- Time zone: UTC+0 (GMT)

Alikalia is a town in Koinadugu District in the Northern Province of Sierra Leone. As of 2009 it had an estimated population of 3,254. Alikalia happens to be the second largest town in Koinadugu District, followed by the head quarter town which is Kabala.

Alikalia is surrounded by hills and streams.
