= Lower Banta Chiefdom =

- Chiefdom
- Country: Sierra Leone
- Province: Southern Province
- District: Moyamba District
- Capital: Gbangbatoke
- Time zone: UTC+0 (GMT)

Lower Banta Chiefdom is a chiefdom in Moyamba District of Sierra Leone. Its capital is Gbangbatoke.
