= Malen Chiefdom =

- Chiefdom
- Location in Sierra Leone
- Coordinates: 7°25′57″N 11°50′26″W
- Country: Sierra Leone
- Province: Southern Province
- District: Pujehun District
- Capital: Sahn

Population (2004)
  - Total: 22,090
- Time zone: UTC+0 (GMT)

Malen Chiefdom is a chiefdom in Pujehun District of Sierra Leone under supervision of Chief B.V.S. Kebby (Kebbie) with a population of 22,090. Its principal town is Sahn. The chiefdom is located west of the town of Pujehun. The primary economic activity is subsistence farming. The largest employer is Socfin, a palm oil producer. Malaria is endemic in the chiefdom with an estimated infection rate of 40% (∓5%).
