= Bagruwa Chiefdom =

- Chiefdom
- Interactive map of Bagruwa Chiefdom
- Coordinates: 7.9200°N 12.5078°W
- Country: Sierra Leone
- Province: Southern Province
- District: Moyamba District
- Capital: Sembehun
- Time zone: UTC+0 (GMT)

Bagruwa Chiefdom is a chiefdom in Moyamba District of Sierra Leone. Its capital is Sembehun.
