= Kaiyamba Chiefdom =

- Chiefdom
- Interactive map of Kaiyamba Chiefdom
- Country: Sierra Leone
- Province: Southern Province
- District: Moyamba District
- Capital: Moyamba
- Time zone: UTC+0 (GMT)

Kaiyamba Chiefdom is a chiefdom in Moyamba District of Sierra Leone. Its capital is Moyamba.

Kaiyamba traces its history back to a warrior named Kaiyamba, who is suggested to be a member of the Kpaa-Mende, and migrated to the area in search of animals around the 1820s. It's suggested that previously, Joko Lamboy, father of Madam Yoko, had previously lived in the land before Kaiyamba's arrival, forcing him to wage war on the warrior, but ultimately ending in Lamboy fleeing, leading to Kaiyamba becoming leader of the land.
