= Kagboro Chiefdom =

- Chiefdom
- Country: Sierra Leone
- Province: Southern Province
- District: Moyamba District
- Capital: Shenge
- Time zone: UTC+0 (GMT)

Kagboro Chiefdom is a chiefdom in Moyamba District of Sierra Leone. Its capital is Shenge, a town on the Atlantic coast.
