= Kholifa Rowalla Chiefdom =

- Chiefdom
- Country: Sierra Leone
- Province: Northern Province
- District: Tonkolili District
- Capital: Magburaka
- Time zone: UTC+0 (GMT)

Kholifa Rowalla Chiefdom is a chiefdom in Tonkolili District of Sierra Leone. Its capital is Magburaka. Sierra Leone is divided into 3 provinces and the Western Area with a total of 149 chiefdoms and 12 districts.
