= Mano Sa Krim Chiefdom =

- Chiefdom
- Country: Sierra Leone
- Province: Southern Province
- District: Pujehun District
- Capital: Gbonjema
- Time zone: UTC+0 (GMT)

Mano Sa Krim Chiefdom is a chiefdom in Pujehun District of Sierra Leone. Its capital is Gbonjema.
