= Gbonkolenken Chiefdom =

- Chiefdom
- Interactive map of Gbonkolenken Chiefdom
- Country: Sierra Leone
- Province: Northern Province
- District: Tonkolili District
- Capital: Yele
- Time zone: UTC+0 (GMT)

Gbonkolenken Chiefdom is a chiefdom in Tonkolili District of Sierra Leone. Its capital is Yele.
