= Gbinle Dixing Chiefdom =

Gbinle Dixing
- Chiefdom
- Interactive map of Gbinle Dixing
- Country: Sierra Leone
- Province: Northern Province
- District: Kambia District
- Capital: Tawuya

Population (2004)
  - Total: 19,569
- Time zone: UTC+0 (GMT)

Gbinle Dixing is a chiefdom in Kambia District of Sierra Leone with a population of 19,569. Its principal town is Tawuya.
