= Lugbu Chiefdom =

- Chiefdom
- Interactive map of Lugbu Chiefdom
- Country: Sierra Leone
- Province: Southern Province
- District: Bo District
- Capital: Sumbuya
- Time zone: UTC+0 (GMT)

Lugbu Chiefdom is a chiefdom in Bo District of Sierra Leone. Its capital is Sumbuya.
