= Imperri Chiefdom =

- Chiefdom
- Country: Sierra Leone
- Province: Southern Province
- District: Bonthe District
- Capital: Gbangbama
- Time zone: UTC+0 (GMT)

Imperri Chiefdom is a chiefdom in Bonthe District of Sierra Leone. Its capital is Gbangbama.
