= Wonde Chiefdom =

- Chiefdom
- Interactive map of Wonde Chiefdom
- Country: Sierra Leone
- Province: Southern Province
- District: Bo District
- Capital: Gboyama
- Time zone: UTC+0 (GMT)

Wonde Chiefdom is a chiefdom in Bo District of Sierra Leone. Its capital is Gboyama.
