= Dema Chiefdom =

Chiefdom in sierra leone

- Chiefdom
- Interactive map of Dema Chiefdom
- Country: Sierra Leone
- Province: Southern Province
- District: Bonthe District
- Capital: Tissana
- Time zone: UTC+0 (GMT)

Dema Chiefdom is a chiefdom in Bonthe District of Sierra Leone. Its capital is Tissana.
