= Kunike Barina Chiefdom =

- Chiefdom
- Country: Sierra Leone
- Province: Northern Province
- District: Tonkolili District
- Capital: Makali
- Time zone: UTC+0 (GMT)

Kunike Barina Chiefdom is a chiefdom in Tonkolili District of Sierra Leone. Its capital is Makali.
