= Sella Limba Chiefdom =

Sella Limba
- Chiefdom
- Interactive map of Sella Limba
- Country: Sierra Leone
- Province: North West Province
- District: Karene District
- Capital: Kamakwie

Population (2004)
  - Total: 52,579
- Time zone: UTC±00:00 (GMT)

Sella Limba is a chiefdom of Karene District in the North West Province of Sierra Leone (before 2017 in Bombali District at Northern Province). The principal town lies at Kamakwie.

As of 2004 the chiefdom has a population of 52,579.
