= Kpanda Chiefdom =

- Chiefdom
- Country: Sierra Leone
- Province: Southern Province
- District: Bonthe District
- Capital: Kemo Motuo
- Time zone: UTC+0 (GMT)

Kpanda Chiefdom is a chiefdom in Bonthe District of Sierra Leone. Its capital is Kemo Motuo.
