= Sowa Chiefdom =

- Chiefdom
- Country: Sierra Leone
- Province: Southern Province
- District: Pujehun District
- Capital: Bandajuma
- Time zone: UTC+0 (GMT)

Sowa Chiefdom is a chiefdom in Pujehun District of Sierra Leone. Its capital is Bandajuma.
