= Panga Krim Chiefdom =

Panga Krim
- Chiefdom
- Location in Sierra Leone
- Country: Sierra Leone
- Province: Northern Province
- District: Pujehun District
- Capital: Gobaru

Population (2004)
  - Total: 6,651
- Time zone: UTC+0 (GMT)

Panga Krim is a chiefdom in Pujehun District of Sierra Leone with a population of 6,651. Its principal town is Gobaru.
