= Fakunya Chiefdom =

- Chiefdom
- Country: Sierra Leone
- Province: Southern Province
- District: Moyamba District
- Capital: Gandohun
- Time zone: UTC+0 (GMT)

Fakunya Chiefdom is a chiefdom in Moyamba District of Sierra Leone. Its capital is Gandohun.
