= Kamaranka =

- Location in Sierra Leone
- Coordinates: 9°18′N 12°13′W
- Country: Sierra Leone
- Province: Northern Province
- District: Bombali District
- Chiefdom: Gbanti Kamaranka
- Time zone: UTC+0 (GMT)

Kamaranka is a small town and seat of the chiefdom of Gbanti Kamaranka in Bombali District in the Northern Province of Sierra Leone.

Current Paramount chief is Patrick Hassan Bangura as of August 31, 2022.
