= Dembelia Sikunia Chiefdom =

Dembelia Sinkunia
- Chiefdom
- Country: Sierra Leone
- Province: Northern Province
- District: Falaba District
- Capital: Sikunia

Population (2004)
  - Total: 14,552
- Time zone: UTC+0 (GMT)

Dembelia Sikunia is a chiefdom in Falaba District of Sierra Leone with a population of 14,552. Its principal town is Sikunia.
