= Bum Chiefdom =

Bum
- Chiefdom
- Location in Sierra Leone
- Country: Sierra Leone
- Province: Southern Province
- District: Bonthe District

Population (2004)
  - Total: 18,827
- Time zone: UTC+0 (GMT)

Bum is a chiefdom in Bonthe District of Sierra Leone. As of 2004 it had a population of 18,827.
