= Barri Chiefdom =

Coordinates: 7°28′N 11°26′W

- Chiefdom
- Interactive map of Barri Chiefdom
- Country: Sierra Leone
- Province: Southern Province
- District: Pujehun District
- Capital: Potoru
- Time zone: UTC+0 (GMT)

Barri Chiefdom is a chiefdom in Pujehun District of Sierra Leone. Its capital is Potoru.
