= Malal Mara Chiefdom =

- Chiefdom
- Country: Sierra Leone
- Province: Northern Province
- District: Tonkolili District
- Capital: Rochin
- Time zone: UTC+0 (GMT)

Malal Mara Chiefdom is a chiefdom in Tonkolili District of Sierra Leone. Its capital is Rochin.

== Government ==
In 2015, Baibaro Maboleh Hashini was installed as Paramount Chief of the Malal Mara Chiefdom.
