= Marampa Chiefdom =

- Chiefdom
- Country: Sierra Leone
- Province: Northern Province
- District: Port Loko District
- Capital: Lunsar
- Time zone: UTC+0 (GMT)

Marampa Chiefdom is a chiefdom in Port Loko District of Sierra Leone. Its capital is Lunsar.
