= Gbo Chiefdom =

- Chiefdom
- Country: Sierra Leone
- Province: Southern Province
- District: Bo District
- Capital: Gbo
- Time zone: UTC+0 (GMT)

Gbo Chiefdom is a chiefdom in Bo District of Sierra Leone. Its capital is Gbo.
