= Ganga-Longoba =

Ethnic group in Cuba

The Ganga-Longoba are a small ethnic group of Afro-Cubans who primarily reside in Perico, Matanzas Province. The community traces their ancestry to a woman named Josefa Ganga who was imported to Cuba in the 1830s. She worked on the Santa Elena sugar refinery near Perico and managed to live past the abolition of slavery in 1886. She passed the tradition of her home village down to her great-granddaughter, Florinda Diago, who in turn passed the tradition to Diago's grandson Humberto Casanova; Casanova and Magdalena "Piyuya" Mora currently lead the Ganga-Longoba community. Her descendants have largely lived their lives in Perico, both before and after the Cuban Revolution.

In 2011, after recording the Ganga-Longoba's songs, British Australian historian Emma Christopher began research into the origin of the songs, eventually connecting with the chief and residents of Mokpangumba, Upper Banta Chiefdom, Moyamba District in Southern Province, Sierra Leone, where residents recognized recordings of the songs and their lyrics as being sung in the nearly-extinct Banta language by the Ganga-Longoba as their own tradition. She helped arrange the travel of a contingent of Ganga-Longoba to Mokpangumba, which rolled out a welcome ceremony for the Cuban visitors. Christopher recorded the process in her documentary They Are We.

== See also ==
- Gullah people, who trace their lineage to Sierra Leone
