= Kafe Simiria Chiefdom =

- Chiefdom
- Country: Sierra Leone
- Province: Northern Province
- District: Tonkolili District
- Capital: Mabonto
- Time zone: UTC+0 (GMT)

Kafe Simiria Chiefdom is a chiefdom in Tonkolili District of Sierra Leone. Its capital is Mabonto.
