= Lunsar =

- Location in Sierra Leone
- Coordinates: 08°41′00″N 12°32′00″W
- Country: Sierra Leone
- Province: North West Province
- District: Port Loko District
- Chiefdom: Marampa Chiefdom

Population (2004 estimate)
  - Total: 36,108 .
- Time zone: UTC-5 (GMT)

Lunsar is a town in Marampa Chiefdom, Port Loko District in the Northern Province of Sierra Leone. It is the largest town in Port Loko District by population. A 2004 estimate placed the population of Lunsar at 36,108. The town is one of the main commercial and business hubs in the North of Sierra Leone. Lunsar lies approximately 50 miles east of Freetown and about 18 miles south-east of the district capital of Port Loko. The inhabitants of Lunsar are largely from the Temne ethnic group.

== History ==
Its most recent history has been an iron ore mining town. The ore, for the most part, is set in stone which forms a huge mountain, called Massaboin Hill. The word stone in the local Temne language is "Sar," and thus befits the area where the iron ore was found. Thus, the town's initial name was "Ro-Sar" meaning the place where the stones are found. Ro-sar later evolved to Lunsar during the colonial era.

== Sports & culture ==
Lunsar is the home to Sierra Leone's largest cycling team, the Lunsar Cycling Team. The team has run the Tour de Lunsar, the country's largest cycle race, annually since 2016. In 2019, two riders from the town, Osman T. Kalokoh and Ibrahim Jalloh, represented Sierra Leone on the national cycling team at the Tour de Guinée.

In 2022, Fatima Deborah Conteh who raced for Lunsar Cycling Team, was offered a professional cycling contract by Canyon / SRAM Generation, making her the first Sierra Leonean to be given a pro contract.

== See also ==
- Railway stations in Sierra Leone
