= Sambaia Chiefdom =

- Chiefdom
- Country: Sierra Leone
- Province: Northern Province
- District: Tonkolili District
- Capital: Bendugu
- Time zone: UTC+0 (GMT)

Sambaia Chiefdom is a chiefdom in Tonkolili District of Sierra Leone. Its capital is Bendugu.

== Government ==
Alhaji Musa Bamba Foray Kulio Jalloh was elected to serve as Paramount Chief of the Sambaia Chiefdom in 2021.
