= Kunike Chiefdom =

- Chiefdom
- Country: Sierra Leone
- Province: Northern Province
- District: Tonkolili District
- Capital: Masingbi
- Time zone: UTC+0 (GMT)

Kunike Chiefdom is a chiefdom in Tonkolili District of Sierra Leone. Its capital is Masingbi.
