= Kamajei Chiefdom =

- Chiefdom
- Interactive map of Kamajei Chiefdom
- Country: Sierra Leone
- Province: Southern Province
- District: Moyamba District
- Capital: Senehun
- Time zone: UTC+0 (GMT)

Kamajei Chiefdom is a chiefdom in Moyamba District of Sierra Leone. Its capital is Senehun.
