= Bombali Shebora Chiefdom =

Bombali Shebora
- Chiefdom
- Interactive map of Bombali Shebora
- Country: Sierra Leone
- Province: Northern Province
- District: Bombali District
- Capital: Makeni

Population (2015)
  - Total: 36,407
- Time zone: UTC±00:00 (GMT)

Bombali Shebora is a chiefdom of Bombali District in the Northern Province of Sierra Leone. The principal town lies at Makeni.

As of 2015 the chiefdom has a population of 36,407.
