= Kwamebai Krim Chiefdom =

- Chiefdom
- Interactive map of Kwamebai Krim Chiefdom
- Country: Sierra Leone
- Province: Southern Province
- District: Bonthe District
- Capital: Benduma
- Time zone: UTC+0 (GMT)

Kwamebai Krim Chiefdom is a chiefdom in Bonthe District of Sierra Leone. Its capital is Benduma.
