= Sulima Chiefdom =

Sulima
- Chiefdom
- Interactive map of Sulima
- Country: Sierra Leone
- Province: Northern Province
- District: Falaba District
- Capital: Falaba

Population (2004)
  - Total: 20,062
- Time zone: UTC+0 (GMT)

Sulima is a chiefdom that is located in the Falaba District of Sierra Leone, with a population of 20,062. Its principal town is Falaba.
