= Folasaba Chiefdom =

- Chiefdom
- Country: Sierra Leone
- Province: Northern Province
- District: Falaba District
- Capital: Musaia
- Time zone: UTC+0 (GMT)

Folasaba Chiefdom is a chiefdom in Falaba District of Sierra Leone. Its capital is Musaia.
