= Kasunko Chiefdom =

Coordinates: 9°31′N 11°49′W

Kasunko
- Chiefdom
- Interactive map of Kasunko
- Country: Sierra Leone
- Province: Northern Province
- District: Koinadugu District
- Capital: Fadugu

Population (2004)
  - Total: 20,357
- Time zone: UTC+0 (GMT)

Kasunko is a chiefdom in Koinadugu District of Sierra Leone with a population of 20,357. Its principal town is Fadugu.
