= Badjia Chiefdom =

- Chiefdom
- Interactive map of Badjia Chiefdom
- Country: Sierra Leone
- Province: Southern Province
- District: Bo District
- Capital: Ngelehun
- Time zone: UTC+0 (GMT)

Badjia Chiefdom is a chiefdom in Bo District of Sierra Leone. Its capital is Ngelehun.

== History and ruling family ==
This chiefdom traces its ancestry to a hunter named Kinnei Kandovo, who is said to have migrated from present day Kono district, to the east. He came with his brother, Kena Gutu (meaning ’short man’ in the Mende language). Kinnei accepted a short staff from the colonial officials and became the first paramount chief, taking the name Kinnei Hindowa, meaning a strong man in Mende. The chiefdom has two ruling families, Hindowa and N’kpoki, who have alternated power, since Kinnei Hindowa was crowned during the 19th century. The chief during the 2013 survey, Samba Bindi Hindowa, was elected in 1989. In 1995, he fled the chiefdom after an RUF attack on nearby Gerihun, only to return in 2001. Compulsory labor on his farms is still reported to be common place in the chiefdom.

=== Hindowa ===
This family traces the lineage of Kinnei, and is based in the town of Kpuwabu.

=== Npoki ===
This family, based in the town of Njama Qui, is thought to be indigenous to the area, or at least to have settled before Kinneis arrival. N’kpoki was a confidant of Kinneis and Kinnei passed the throne to N’kpoki upon his death. It is likely that this agreement to pass the throne was established with the help of the British.
