= Gallines Perri Chiefdom =

- Chiefdom
- Country: Sierra Leone
- Province: Southern Province
- District: Pujehun District
- Capital: Blama
- Time zone: UTC+0 (GMT)

Gallines Perri Chiefdom is a chiefdom in Pujehun District of Sierra Leone. Its capital is Blama.
