= Masiaka =

Masiaka Masiaka, Sierra Leone
- Location in Sierra Leone
- Coordinates: 8°46′0″N 12°47′15″W
- Country: Sierra Leone
- Province: Northern Province
- District: Port Loko District

Population (2004 census)
  - Total: 3,600
- Time zone: UTC-5 (GMT)

Masiaka is a town in Port Loko District in the Northern Province of Sierra Leone. The town is located 40 miles (64 km) from Freetown. It is one of the major towns in Northern Sierra Leone and is on the main highway linking Freetown to the Provinces. The population of Masiaka was 3,600 in the 2004 census, largely from the Temne ethnic group.

The town has several primary schools and one secondary school called the Sierra Leone Islamic Federation Secondary School . The town has a single police station called the Masiaka Police Station and is run by the Port Loko District division of the Sierra Leone Police .

== Sources ==
http://www.thepatrioticvanguard.com/spip.php?article5828
