= Timdale Chiefdom =

- Chiefdom
- Interactive map of Timdale Chiefdom
- Country: Sierra Leone
- Province: Southern Province
- District: Moyamba District
- Capital: Bomotoke
- Time zone: UTC+0 (GMT)

Timdale Chiefdom is a chiefdom in Moyamba District of Sierra Leone. Its capital is Bomotoke.
