= Debia Chiefdom =

- Chiefdom
- Country: Sierra Leone
- Province: North West Province
- District: Karene District
- Capital: Gbinti
- Time zone: UTC+0 (GMT)

Debia Chiefdom is a chiefdom in Karene District of Sierra Leone. Before 2017, it was part of Port Loko District. Its capital is Gbinti.
