= Bendu Chiefdom =

- Chiefdom
- Country: Sierra Leone
- Province: Southern Province
- District: Bonthe District
- Capital: Cha Bendu
- Time zone: UTC+0 (GMT)

Bendu Chiefdom is a chiefdom in Bonthe District of Sierra Leone. Its capital is Cha Bendu.
