= Rotifunk =

- Location in Sierra Leone
- Coordinates: 8°14′N 12°41′W
- Country: Sierra Leone
- Province: Southern Province
- District: Moyamba District
- Chiefdom: Bumpe Chiefdom
- Time zone: UTC-5 (GMT)

Rotifunk is a town in Moyamba District, in the Southern Province of Sierra Leone. The Sherbro make up the largest ethnic group in the town.

Rotifunk is the birthplace of Sierra Leonean politician, John Karefa-Smart, and writer, John Akar.

== Healthcare ==
Hatfield Archer Memorial Hospital, Rotifunk

== Namesakes ==
There are other towns in Sierra Leone with the same name.
