= Kholifa Mabang Chiefdom =

- Chiefdom
- Interactive map of Kholifa Mabang Chiefdom
- Country: Sierra Leone
- Province: Northern Province
- District: Tonkolili District
- Capital: Mabang
- Time zone: UTC+0 (GMT)

Kholifa Mabang Chiefdom is a chiefdom in Tonkolili District of Sierra Leone. Its capital is Mabang, Sierra Leone.
