= Rokupr =

- Location in Sierra Leone
- Coordinates: 09°01′00″N 12°57′00″W
- Country: Sierra Leone
- Province: Northern Province
- District: Kambia District
- Elevation: 59 ft (18 m)

Population (2013)
  - Total: 12,744
- Time zone: UTC+0 (GMT)

Rokupr is a small town in Kambia District in the Northern Province of Sierra Leone. As of 2013 it had an estimated population of 12,744.

== Geography ==
Rokupr is located at 09.0167°N 12.95°W. It has an average elevation of 18 metres (62 feet).
