= Lungi, Sierra Leone =

- Interactive map of Lungi, Sierra Leone
- Coordinates: 8°37′N 13°12′W
- Country: Sierra Leone
- Province: North West Province
- District: Port Loko District

Population (2004 estimate)
  - Total: 4,185
- Time zone: UTC-5 (GMT)

Lungi is a coastal town in Port Loko District in the North West Province of Sierra Leone. The town lies approximately 40 miles (64 km) north of the district capital Port Loko and had a population of 4,185 in the 2004 census.

Lungi is best known for being home to the Lungi International Airport, the international airport that serves Sierra Leone. The sea separates Lungi from Sierra Leone's capital Freetown. Some of the most luxurious hotels and restaurants in Sierra Leone are based in Lungi.

There are frequent commercial helicopter, hovercraft, buses and ferry services to Freetown and other parts of Sierra Leone from Lungi.

== History ==
Dala Modu Dumbuya, a Susu trader from Wonkafong, Sumbuya settled here in 1806 after being based in Freetown for over ten years. However, he was accused of slave trading. The town was previously called Madina, but that name is now used for Madina, Port Loko District, a small settlement to the south. Under Dala Modu the location became an important trading centre between Freetown and the rivers further north. It was also the major Muslim centre along this stretch of the coast.

== Climate ==
Climate data for Lungi (1961–1990)
Month	Jan	Feb	Mar	Apr	May	Jun	Jul	Aug	Sep	Oct	Nov	Dec	Year
Mean daily maximum °C (°F)	30.8 (87.4)	30.7 (87.3)	31.0 (87.8)	31.4 (88.5)	30.9 (87.6)	29.5 (85.1)	28.1 (82.6)	27.7 (81.9)	28.7 (83.7)	29.7 (85.5)	30.4 (86.7)	30.5 (86.9)	30.0 (85.9)
Daily mean °C (°F)	26.3 (79.3)	26.8 (80.2)	27.2 (81.0)	27.7 (81.9)	27.4 (81.3)	26.3 (79.3)	25.3 (77.5)	25.1 (77.2)	25.5 (77.9)	26.0 (78.8)	26.7 (80.1)	26.4 (79.5)	26.4 (79.5)
Mean daily minimum °C (°F)	22.2 (72.0)	23.3 (73.9)	24.1 (75.4)	24.6 (76.3)	23.8 (74.8)	23.0 (73.4)	22.8 (73.0)	22.8 (73.0)	22.8 (73.0)	22.6 (72.7)	23.1 (73.6)	22.6 (72.7)	23.1 (73.7)
Average precipitation mm (inches)	2.3 (0.09)	4.1 (0.16)	8.1 (0.32)	47.8 (1.88)	192.4 (7.57)	349.4 (13.76)	690.1 (27.17)	788.8 (31.06)	501.2 (19.73)	299.6 (11.80)	110.2 (4.34)	23.0 (0.91)	3,017 (118.79)
Average rainy days	0	0	1	4	14	22	27	27	24	21	10	2	152
Average afternoon relative humidity (%) (at 15:00 LST)	59	62	63	66	71	78	82	84	80	76	73	63	71
Average dew point °C (°F)	21.4 (70.5)	22.1 (71.8)	22.3 (72.1)	23.0 (73.4)	23.6 (74.5)	23.5 (74.3)	23.0 (73.4)	23.0 (73.4)	23.2 (73.8)	23.3 (73.9)	23.6 (74.5)	22.1 (71.8)	22.8 (73.1)
Mean monthly sunshine hours	235.6	221.2	235.6	213.0	195.3	162.0	108.5	89.9	132.0	186.0	201.0	213.9	2,194
Mean daily sunshine hours	7.6	7.9	7.6	7.1	6.3	5.4	3.5	2.9	4.4	6.0	6.7	6.9	6.0
Source: NOAA
