= Gbangbatoke Airport =

Airport in Sierra Leone

- IATA: GBK; ICAO: GFGK

Summary
- Airport type: Public
- Serves: Gbangbatok
- Elevation AMSL: 75 ft / 23 m
- Coordinates: 7°48′45″N 12°22′40″W

Map

Runways
Direction	Length		Surface
Direction	ft	m	Surface
06/24	3,300	1,005	Unpaved
- Source: Google Maps

Gbangbatoke Airport (IATA: GBK, ICAO: GFGK) is an airport serving Gbangbatoke in the Moyamba District of Sierra Leone.

== See also ==
- Transport in Sierra Leone
