= Tambakha Chiefdom =

Coordinates: 9°44′N 12°16′W

Tambakha
- Chiefdom
- Interactive map of Tambakha
- Country: Sierra Leone
- Province: North West Province
- District: Karene District
- Capital: Fintonia

Population (2004)
  - Total: 17,675
- Time zone: UTC±00:00 (GMT)

Tambakha is a chiefdom of Karene District in the North West Province of Sierra Leone. The principal town lies at Fintonia.

In 2004, the chiefdom had a population of 17,675.
