= Penguia Chiefdom =

- Chiefdom
- Country: Sierra Leone
- Province: Eastern Province
- District: Kailahun District
- Capital: Sandar
- Time zone: UTC+0 (GMT)

Penguia Chiefdom is a chiefdom in Kailahun District of Sierra Leone. Its capital is Sandaru.
