= Gbanti Kamaranka Chiefdom =

Gbanti Kamaranka
- Chiefdom
- Interactive map of Gbanti Kamaranka
- Country: Sierra Leone
- Province: Northern Province
- District: Bombali District
- Capital: Kamaranka

Population (2004)
  - Total: 26,126
- Time zone: UTC±00:00 (GMT)

Gbanti Kamaranka is a chiefdom of Bombali District in the Northern Province of Sierra Leone. The principal town lies at Kamaranka.

As of 2004 the chiefdom has a population of 26,126.
