= Briama Chiefdom =

Bramaia
- Chiefdom
- Country: Sierra Leone
- Province: North West Province
- District: Kambia District
- Capital: Kukuna

Population (2004)
  - Total: 29,392
- Time zone: UTC+0 (GMT)

Bramaia is a chiefdom in Kambia District of Sierra Leone with a population of 29,392. Its principal town is Kukuna.
