= Sorogbema Chiefdom =

- Chiefdom
- Country: Sierra Leone
- Province: Southern Province
- District: Pujehun District
- Capital: Fairo
- Time zone: UTC+0 (GMT)

Sorogbema Chiefdom is a chiefdom in the Pujehun District of Sierra Leone. Its capital is Fairo.
