= Sanda Loko Chiefdom =

Coordinates: 9°26′N 12°08′W

Sanda Loko
- Chiefdom
- Interactive map of Sanda Loko
- Country: Sierra Leone
- Province: North West Province
- District: Karene District
- Capital: Kamalo

Population (2004)
  - Total: 27,667
- Time zone: UTC±00:00 (GMT)

Sanda Loko is a chiefdom of Karene District in the North West Province of Sierra Leone. Before 2017, it was part of Bombali District. The principal town lies at Kamalo. As of 2004, the chiefdom has a population of 27,667.
