= Niawa Chiefdom =

Coordinates: 7°40′N 11°24′W

- Chiefdom
- Interactive map of Niawa Chiefdom
- Country: Sierra Leone
- Province: Eastern Province
- District: Kenema District
- Capital: Sundumei
- Time zone: UTC+0 (GMT)

Niawa Chiefdom is a chiefdom in Kenema District of Sierra Leone. Its capital is Sundumei.
