= Libeisaygahun Chiefdom =

Libeisaygahun
- Chiefdom
- Interactive map of Libeisaygahun
- Country: Sierra Leone
- Province: North West Province
- District: Karene District
- Capital: Batkanu

Population (2004)
  - Total: 13,355
- Time zone: UTC±00:00 (GMT)

Libeisaygahun is a chiefdom of Karene District in the North West Province of Sierra Leone. Before 2017, it was part of Bombali District. The principal town lies at Batkanu.

As of 2004 the chiefdom has a population of 13,355.
