= Buya Romende Chiefdom =

- Chiefdom
- Country: Sierra Leone
- Province: Northern Province
- District: Port Loko District
- Capital: Foredugu
- Time zone: UTC+0 (GMT)

Buya Romende Chiefdom is a chiefdom in Port Loko District of Sierra Leone. Its capital is Foredugu.
