= Alpha Timbo =

Sierra Leone Minister of Labour and Industrial Relations
- In office 2001–2007

Personal details
- Born: April 27, 1961 (age 65) Rokulan, Karene District, Sierra Leone
- Party: Sierra Leone People's Party (SLPP)
- Spouse: Isatu Dainkeh-Timbo
- Children: Minkailu Timbo; Tigidankay Timbo; Alhaji Abdulai Timbo; Adiatu Timbo
- Education: Fourah Bay College
- Profession: lecturer, Trade unionist

Alhaji Alpha Osman Timbo (born on April 27, 1961 ) is a Sierra Leonean politician, educationist, lecturer and trade unionist . He was Sierra Leone Minister of Labour and Industrial Relations from 2001-2002 under president Ahmad Tejan Kabbah .

He unsuccessfully ran for the presidential candidate of the Sierra Leone People's Party (SLPP) ahead of the 2012 Sierra Leone presidential elections. He finished in fourth place at the July 31, 2011 SLPP convention held at the Miata Hall in Freetown, behind Julius Maada Bio, Usman Boie Kamara and Andrew Keili .

Timbo had served as the Secretary General of the Sierra Leone Teachers’ Union. He had also served as the chairman of the Sierra Leone National Premier League . He is the current chairman of Sierra Leone Premier League club Mighty Blackpool.

== Early life and education ==
Alhaji Alpha Osman Timbo was born in the small rural town of Rokulan, Sanda Tenraren Chiefdom, Karene District in the North West Province of Sierra Leone. Alpha Timbo was born to an ethnic Fula father named Alhaji Minkailu Timbo, and to an ethnic Fula mother named Haja Adiatu Barrie . Alpha Timbo attended the Bombali District Education Committee primary school in his hometown of Rokuland from 1967 to 1973 [(BDEC)]. He then proceeded to the St. Francis Secondary School in Makeni, where he completed up to form five level of education from 1974 to 1979. In 1980, he transferred to the Ahmadiyya Muslim Secondary School in the capital Freetown where he completed his secondary education in 1981. Immediately after secondary school in 1981, Timbo enrolled at the Fourah Bay College and graduated with a Bachelor of Arts Degree in History, Law and Philosophy in 1985.

== Political career ==
Timbo was Sierra Leone Minister of Labour and Industrial Relations from 2001-2002 under president Ahmad Tejan Kabbah .

He unsuccessfully ran for the presidential candidate of the Sierra Leone People's Party (SLPP) ahead of the 2012 Sierra Leone presidential elections. He finished in fourth place at the July 31, 2011 SLPP convention held at the Miata Hall in Freetown, behind Julius Maada Bio, Usman Boie Kamara and Andrew Keili .

After an initial bid for the flagbearership of the SLPP ahead of the 2017 Presidential election, Timbo pulled out of the race on September 29, 2017 and announced his support for Julius Maada Bio, who would go on to be elected flagbearer for the party on October 14, 2017.
