= Mateboi =

Coordinates: 9°06′N 12°21′W

- Interactive map of Mateboi
- Country: Sierra Leone
- Province: North West Province
- District: Karene District
- Chiefdom: Sanda Tenraren
- Time zone: UTC±00:00 (GMT)

Mateboi is a small town and seat of the chiefdom of Sanda Tenraren in Karene District in the North West Province of Sierra Leone.
