= Batkanu =

- Location in Sierra Leone
- Coordinates: 09°05′00″N 12°25′00″W
- Country: Sierra Leone
- Province: North West Province
- District: Karene District
- Chiefdom: Libeisaygahun
- Elevation: 112 ft (34 m)
- Time zone: UTC+0 (GMT)

Batkanu is a village and seat of the chiefdom of Libeisaygahun in Karene District in the North West Province of Sierra Leone.

== Geographic facts ==
Latitude: 9.0833, Longitude: -12.4167, Elevation: 114 feet (35 meters).

== Climate ==
Like almost all of Sierra Leone, Batkanu has a tropical monsoon climate (Köppen Am) with very warm to hot temperatures year-round, a short though very pronounced dry season from December to March, and a long, very rainy wet season from April to November. Batkanu’s climate is less extreme than coastal locations like Freetown or Conakry, with the wettest months receiving less than 500 millimetres or 20 inches in contrast with 1,000 millimetres or 40 inches in those coastal cities.

Climate data for Batkanu
Month	Jan	Feb	Mar	Apr	May	Jun	Jul	Aug	Sep	Oct	Nov	Dec	Year
Mean daily maximum °C (°F)	33 (91)	35 (95)	36 (96)	35 (95)	34 (93)	32 (89)	29 (84)	28 (82)	30 (86)	32 (89)	33 (91)	32 (89)	32 (89)
Mean daily minimum °C (°F)	20 (68)	21 (69)	22 (71)	22 (71)	22 (71)	21 (69)	21 (69)	21 (69)	21 (69)	21 (69)	21 (69)	20 (68)	21 (69)
Average rainfall mm (inches)	2.5 (0.1)	5.1 (0.2)	25 (1)	94 (3.7)	230 (8.9)	390 (15.2)	450 (17.6)	480 (18.8)	470 (18.4)	410 (16.2)	180 (6.9)	18 (0.7)	2,730 (107.5)
Source: Weatherbase

== Images ==
http://maps.fallingrain.com/perl/map.cgi?kind=illum&scale=-5&x=480&y=360&xcenter=-12.4167&ycenter=9.0833&lat=9.0833&long=-12.4167&name=Batkanu&c=
