= Bailor Barrie =

Sierra Leonean businessman, activist and tribal leader (1937–1989)

Personal details
- Born: 1934 Sokurala, Neya Chiefdom, Falaba District, British Sierra Leone
- Died: 1989 (aged 55) Kenema, Sierra Leone
- Spouse: 4
- Children: 19
- Occupation: Business tycoon, tribal leader, Philanthropist.
- Known for: Sierra Leone diamond trade, Activism and Philanthropy.

Alhaji Mohamed Bailor Barrie, simply referred to as Bailor Barrie or M.B. Barrie (1934 – 1989) was a Sierra Leonean businessman, activist and philanthropist. He hailed from Neya Chiefdom in Sierra Leone's Falaba District and was a member of the Fula ethnic group of which he later became a well known activist and leader. Barrie became prominent in Sierra Leone's post colonial economic environment in the 1970s as the first Fula to venture into the European-Lebanese dominated import business of motor vehicles. He became very successful in the booming diamond mining and trading industry in the 1970s and 1980s, which established him as one of Sierra Leone's most successful businessmen, even without a standard level of education. Then president of Sierra Leone Siaka Stevens was using Barrie's success to defend himself against critics attacking him for ignoring the country's crumbling educational sector, by claiming that one could be successful like Barrie without any standard level of education. Barrie died in a road accident in 1989 on his way from Kenema, in the eastern part of Sierra Leone.

== Early life ==
Mohamed Bailor Barrie was born in 1934, in Sokurala, in the Neya Chiefdom, Falaba District, in British Sierra Leone, to prominent cattle herder and Fula chieftain Alhaji Bademba Barrie and one of his wives Haja Binta. Like many people who grew up in a typical Islamic-Fulani home, Barrie acquired Quranic education at an early age. He gained some level of Western education at an early age too, however he quit before completing the standard level of secondary school education during his time, due to a lack of interest - as he was very eager to jump into business.

== Business career ==
Alhaji Barrie was very successful and prominent in Sierra Leone's business environment from the 1970s up to his untimely death in 1989. He was a fierce competitor to other prominent Sierra Leonean businessmen of his time, such as "Skipper" and Jamil Sahid.

In 1956, as the Sierra Leone colonial administration decided to restrict the mining activities of the Sierra Leone Selection Trust (SLST), which had been solely responsible for mining diamonds in Sierra Leone since they were discovered in the early 1930s, licenses to mine were then granted to individuals to mine diamonds in Kono. This programme, referred to as the Alluvial Diamond Mining Scheme (ADMS), brought about a boom in trade of the precious metal. Like many people, from different ethnicities, this attracted Barrie as well. It prompted him to ask his father for seed money to move to Kono to engage in the trade; later becoming legendary in the business. In order to finance this new business pursuit, Barrie's father had to sell some of his cattle to raise cash for Barrie's seed money.

As his diamond business became profitable, he used such profits to diversify into other areas of the Sierra Leone economy, such as the motor vehicle trade. Barrie saw the diamond trade as the "cash cow" and that it was never a reliable enterprise that warranted long-term investment of capital. Hence in later years of his diamond business career, he was more focused on buying from local miners and then selling to foreign buyers either at home or abroad. He became broadly involved in various other business ventures in the Sierra Leone economy, such as real estate, transport and hospitality.

As Barrie became highly successful without any standard level of education, he became the subject of a major national debate on the value of education in Sierra Leone as a means to a successful life, as then President Siaka Stevens was using Barrie's success as an example to defend himself against critics who kept on attacking him for his lack of pragmatic policies or emphasis on the country's crumbling educational sector. President Stevens compared Barrie to one of Sierra Leone's most educated and successful academics, Professor Davidson Nicol, such as in one of his well known quotes (in Krio): "Dem say Bailor Barrie you say Davidson Nicol." Meaning, in our society, despite Professor Nicol being highly educated but not rich, he would not be considered successful and would not get the kind of respect, recognition and popularity that a far less educated but rich Bailor Barrie now commands. Ironically, throughout his business career, Bailor Barrie himself continuously emphasised on the value of education (both Quranic and Western). He contributed to and pioneered various educational projects and endeavours during his time. He was a major contributor in the development of the Ansarul Islamic Secondary School in Koidu, Kono District, where he spent a significant amount of time during his business career. All of Barrie's children are educated, to various levels of educational achievements.

== As President of the Fula Progressive Union (FPU) ==
Barrie was made President of the FPU during President Stevens' tenure. The FPU is a social organisation that seeks to protect and advocate for the interests, civil rights and welfare of Fula people in Sierra Leone. As president of FPU, Barrie advocated and defended broad Fula interests, ranging from immigration to business and politics. As the Stevens administration was pursuing Fulas, accusing some of involvement in illicit mining activities in Kono, Barrie played a key role in lobbying the Stevens administration on issues relating to the participation of Fulas in the diamond trade. However, the relationship between President Stevens and Alhaji Barrie became strained in 1982 when a diamond sale dispute between Alhaji Barrie and Jamil Sahid in neighbouring Guinea did not go down well for Jamil Sahid, who was very close to President Stevens. That is, then President of Guinea Ahmed Sékou Touré favoured Barrie instead of Jamil in competing deals between Barrie and Jamil. This led to Fulas in Sierra Leone facing various harassments by the Stevens administration. However, President Toure, speaking on Guinean radio called for an immediate end to “such unacceptable behaviour”.

Alhaji Barrie's influence led to the FPU gaining strong support from the Fula business community in Sierra Leone, which led to an increase in Fula people's participation in national politics, such as voter turnouts during nationwide elections, prompting the government to start recognising the Fulas as an integral part of the country.

== Family ==
At the time of his death, Alhaji Barrie was married to four wives and had at least 15 children.

== Death and funeral ==
Alhaji Barrie was involved in a fatal road accident in 1989, just a few miles from Sierra Leone's eastern town of Kenema. He was on his way back to Freetown, where he was residing, after a short trip.

Barrie was hailed a hero by many people in Sierra Leone, especially within the Fula and Muslim communities. His legacy was seen as something that no one could be capable of replicating. His funeral attracted a lot of people across the country. Barrie's funeral procession was packed with sympathisers across ethnic groups. He was laid to rest at Freetown's Kissy Road cemetery.
