= Fintonia =

- Location in Sierra Leone
- Coordinates: 9°40′N 12°14′W
- Country: Sierra Leone
- Province: North West Province
- District: Karene District
- Chiefdom: Tambakha
- Time zone: UTC+0 (GMT)

Fintonia is a village and seat of the chiefdom of Tambakha in Karene District in the North West Province of Sierra Leone.
