= Upper Banta Chiefdom =

- Chiefdom
- Location in Sierra Leone
- Country: Sierra Leone
- Province: Southern Province
- District: Moyamba District
- Capital: Mokelle
- Time zone: UTC+0 (GMT)

Upper Banta Chiefdom is a chiefdom in Moyamba District of Sierra Leone. Its capital is Mokelle.
