= Kamalo, Sierra Leone =

Kamalo
- Country: Sierra Leone
- Province: North West Province
- District: Karene District
- Chiefdom: Sanda Loko
- Time zone: UTC±00:00 (GMT)

Kamalo is a small town and seat of the chiefdom of Sanda Loko in Karene District in the North West Province of Sierra Leone. Before 2017, it was part of Bombali District.
