= Koya Chiefdom =

- Chiefdom
- Country: Sierra Leone
- Province: North West Province
- District: Port Loko District
- Capital: Songo
- Time zone: UTC+0 (GMT)

Koya Chiefdom also known as Western Koya is a chiefdom in Port Loko District of Sierra Leone. Its capital is Songo.

== Economy ==
Recently, Koya Chiefdom will be have industrial district named Sierra Leone Industrial Zone-Koya (SIZ-Koya) and built by the ARISE Integrated Industrial Platforms (ARISE IIP) with funding from Indian and South Korean investors. It is 15 km^{2} (1,500 ha; 3,700 acres) wide and powered by 100 MW (134,100 hp) solar power system.
