= Dea Chiefdom =

- Chiefdom
- Country: Sierra Leone
- Province: Eastern Province
- District: Kailahun District
- Capital: Baiwala

Population (2004)
  - Total: 9,876
- Time zone: UTC+0 (GMT)

Dea Chiefdom is a chiefdom in Kailahun District of Sierra Leone with a population of 9,876. Its capital is Baiwala.
