= Kissi Tongi Chiefdom =

- Chiefdom
- Interactive map of Kissi Tongi Chiefdom
- Coordinates: 8°13′00″N 10°21′30″W
- Country: Sierra Leone
- Province: Eastern Province
- District: Kailahun District
- Capital: Buedu

Population (2004)
  - Total: 33,457
- Time zone: UTC+0 (GMT)

Kissi Tongi Chiefdom is a chiefdom in Kailahun District of Sierra Leone with a population of 33,457. Its principal town is Buedu. During the Sierra Leone Civil War the Kissi Tongi Chiefdom was one of the major strongholds of the Revolutionary United Front (RUF). The War Office of the RUF was opened in Buedu in February 1998, and Kissi Tongi was one of the last chiefdoms to be disarmed in January 2002.
