= Tankoro Chiefdom =

- Chiefdom
- Country: Sierra Leone
- Province: Eastern Province
- District: Kono District
- Capital: New Sembehun
- Time zone: UTC+0 (GMT)

Tankoro Chiefdom is a chiefdom in Kono District of Sierra Leone. Its capital is New Sembehun.
