= Samuel Benjamin Thomas =

Sierra Leonean entrepreneur and philanthropist

Samuel Benjamin (Akube) Thomas (fl. 1833 – 1901) was a Sierra Leonean entrepreneur and philanthropist who amassed a large fortune from which he left a substantial endowment for the establishment of an agricultural college.

Born in Wellington, Freetown to Creole parents, Thomas attended the CMS Grammar School and later Fourah Bay College where he studied Christian theology.

One of the richest Africans of his era, Thomas later developed a keen interest in practical agriculture and possessed the wealth to turn his views into reality. Upon his death, he left a large endowment for the establishment of the first agricultural college in West Africa to train students, not only in the liberal arts or Christian theology, but also in the theory and practice of agriculture.

The foundation stone for the S.B. Thomas Agricultural Academy, was laid by Governor Leslie Probyn on 28 January 1909 and the college was opened in 1912 on 1000 acres of land in Ribbi Chiefdom, Moyamba District.
