= Isata Mahoi =

Sierra Leonean actress and host

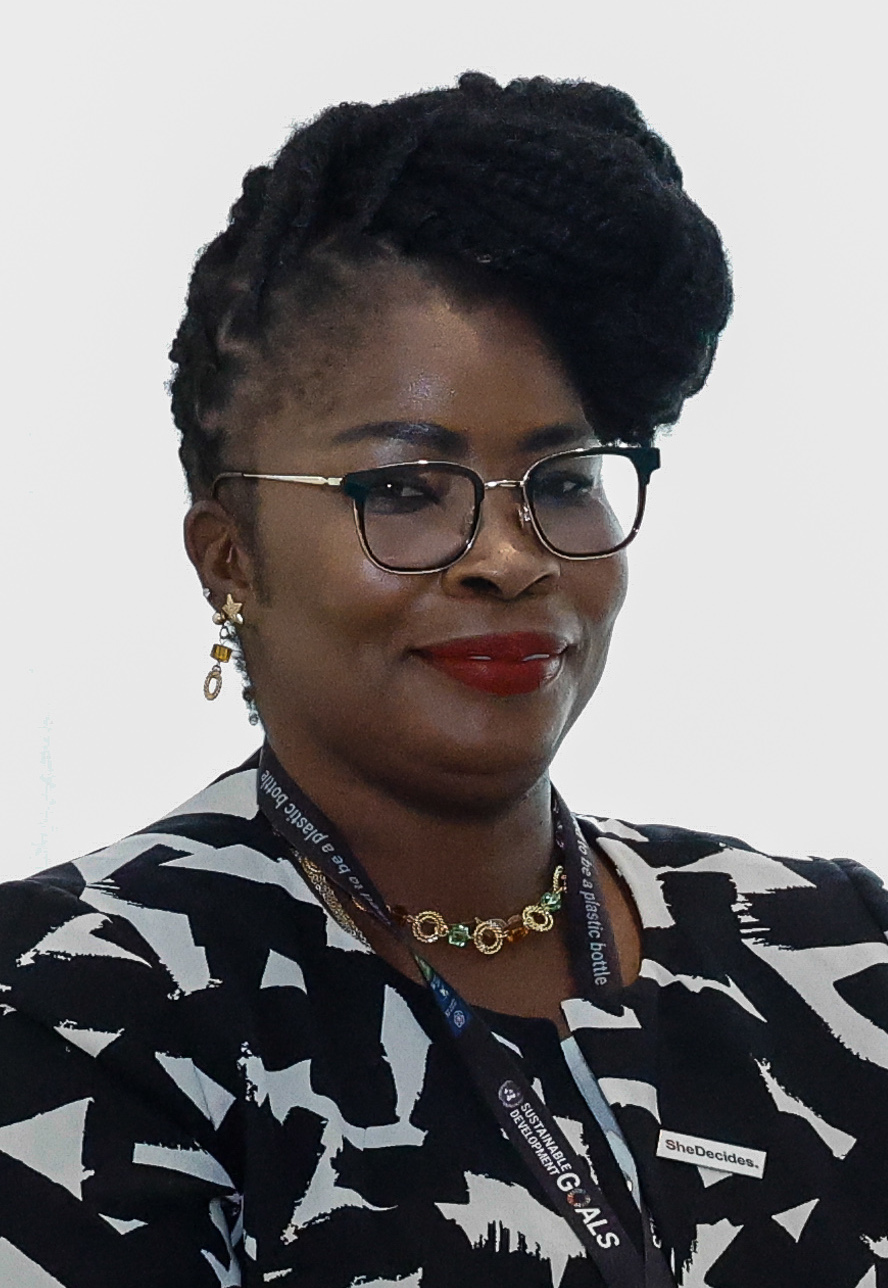
- Isata Mahoi in 2026
- Born: Ribbi Chiefdom, Sierra Leone
- Occupations: Radio talk show host; actress

Isata Mahoi (born in Ribbi Chiefdom, Moyamba District from a ruling royal family) is a Sierra Leonean radio talk show host and actress in the soap opera program Atunda Ayenda. Commonly known in Sierra Leone by her stage name Mammy Saio, she is one of the most famous Sierra Leonean entertainers. In recent years she has been involved on gender issues and specifically focusing on the human rights of women and children. She is also an economist.

Atunda Ayenda is the most popular and most widely listened to radio program in Sierra Leone. Atunda Ayenda was created through a non-government organisation search to help people understand the political and social conditions in Sierra Leone. The show is broadcast on all major radio stations throughout the country.

As of 2024, she was serving as Sierra Leone's Minister of Gender and Children's Affairs.

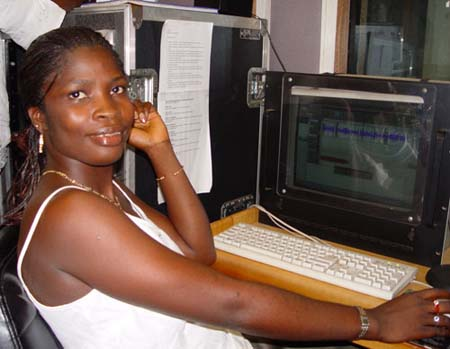
Isata Mahoi in 2004 shown editing radio programmes in Talking Drum studio Freetown
