= Sengbe Chiefdom =

Coordinates: 9°32′N 11°21′W

Sengbe
- Chiefdom
- Interactive map of Sengbe
- Country: Sierra Leone
- Province: Northern Province
- District: Koinadugu District
- Capital: Yogomaia

Population (2004)
  - Total: 22,458
- Time zone: UTC+0 (GMT)

Sengbe is a chiefdom in Koinadugu District of Sierra Leone with a population of 22,458. Its principal town is Yogomaia.
