= Gbense Chiefdom =

- Chiefdom
- Country: Sierra Leone
- Province: Eastern Province
- District: Kono District
- Capital: Yardu
- Time zone: UTC+0 (GMT)

Gbense Chiefdom is a chiefdom in Kono District of Sierra Leone. Its capital is Yardu.
