= Mongo Chiefdom =

Mongo
- Chiefdom
- Country: Sierra Leone
- Province: Northern Province
- District: Falaba District
- Capital: Bendugu

Population (2004)
  - Total: 29,294
- Time zone: UTC+0 (GMT)

Mongo is a chiefdom in Falaba District of Sierra Leone with a population of 29,294. Its principal town is Bendugu.
