= Kongbora Chiefdom =

Kongbora Chiefdom is a Chiefdom of Sierra Leone located in Moyamba District, Southern Province, Sierra Leone. It is centred on Bauya.

The name arose from the combination of the son, Kong and daughter, Bora of Gbenjei, a nineteenth century ruler of the Kpa Mende.
