= Karene District =

- Location of Karene District in Sierra Leone
- Country: Sierra Leone
- Province: North West
- Capital: Kamakwie

Government
  - Type: District Council
  - District Council Chairman: John Dito Kamara (APC))

Area
  - Total: 5,828 km^{2} (2,250 sq mi)

Population (2021 census)
  - Total: 290,323
  - Density: 49.82/km^{2} (129.0/sq mi)
- Time zone: UTC-5 (Greenwich Mean Time)

Karene District is a district in the North West Province, Sierra Leone. Karene is one of the sixteen districts that make up the Republic of Sierra Leone. The capital and largest city of Karene District is Kamakwie Karene along with Falaba District are the two new districts of Sierra Leone formed in December 2017, after they were ratified by the Sierra Leone Parliament in the government of former president Ernest Bai Koroma

The major economic activity in Karene is farming. The Temne people is the predominant majority ethnic group in Karene.

== Administrative divisions ==
=== Chiefdoms ===
After the 2017 local administrative reorganization, Kerene District has made up of thirteen chiefdoms as the third level of administrative subdivision.

Prior to the 2017 local administrative reorganization, Libeisaygahun, Sanda Loko, Sanda Tenraren, Sella Limba and Tambakha Chiefdoms were formerly from Bombali District; and were Buya Romende, Debia and Sanda Magbolontor Chiefdoms were formerly from Port Loko District.

1. Buya (Note: Formerly part of Buya Romende Chiefdom; split off.) – ?
2. Debia – Gbinti
3. Gbanti (Note: Formerly part of Gbanti Kamaranka Chiefdom from Bombali District before splitting off.) – ?
4. Libeisaygahun-Gbombahun – Batkanu
5. Mafonda Makerembay (Note: Formerly part of Libeisaygahun-Gbombahun Chiefdom.) – ?
6. Romende – Foredugu
7. Safroko (Note: Formerly part of Debia Chiefdom.) – ?
8. Sanda Loko – Kamalo
9. Sanda Magbolontor – Sendugu
10. Sanda Tenraren – Mateboi
11. Sella Limba – Kamakwie
12. Tambakha Simibungie (Note: Formerly part of Tambakha Chiefdom; split off.) – ?
13. Tambakha Yobangie – Fintonia
