= List of wars involving Sierra Leone =

This is a list of wars involving the Republic of Sierra Leone.

| Conflict | Combatant 1 | Combatant 2 | Result |
|---|---|---|---|
| Ndogboyosoi War (1982) | All People's Congress | Sierra Leone People's Party | Indecisive: Indirect contribution to the rise of the Revolutionary United Front |
| Sierra Leonean Civil War (1991–2002) | Sierra Leone: SLA; CDF; United Kingdom; Guinea; ECOMOG Forces; Executive Outcomes Supported by: United States; Belarus (United Nations) UNAMSIL | RUF (Sierra Leone) AFRC; West Side Boys; Liberia: NPFL; Supported by: Libya; Burkina Faso; Moldova | Commonwealth victory |
| Mali War (2012–present) | Mali; France; Germany; Chad; Nigeria; Sierra Leone | NMLA Ansar Dine; AQIM | Ongoing: Partial defeat of the Islamists and ceasefire with the NMLA. |
