= Bendugu, Sierra Leone =

Bendugu
- Location in Sierra Leone
- Coordinates: 8°37′N 11°10′W
- Country: Sierra Leone
- Province: Northern Province
- District: Falaba District
- Time zone: UTC-5 (GMT)

Bendugu is the capital and largest town of Falaba District in the Northern Province of Sierra Leone. Bendugu is a very rural town and is also the seat of Mongo Chiefdom. Bendugu is located in close proximity to the international border with the Republic of Guinea. Bendugu is about 85 miles to Kabala, and is 300 miles east of Freetown. The main economic activity in the town is farming.

The vast majority of the population of Bendugu are from the Kuranko and Yalunka ethnic groups. The overwhelming majority of the residents of Bendugu are Muslims, with a small Christian minority. As with most parts of Sierra Leone, the Krio language of the Sierra Leone Creole people is the most widely spoken language in Bendugu.
