= Sanda Tenraren Chiefdom =

Sanda Tenraren
- Chiefdom
- Country: Sierra Leone
- Province: North West Province
- District: Karene District
- Capital: Mateboi

Government
  - Paramount Chief: PC Sheik Abdulrahman Tejan Bangura Kafoir 1

Population (2004)
  - Total: 18,840
- Time zone: UTC±00:00 (GMT)

Sanda Tenraren is a chiefdom of Karene District in the North West Province of Sierra Leone. The principal town lies at Mateboi.

As of 2004 the chiefdom has a population of 18,840.
