= Falaba District =

- Location of Falaba District in Sierra Leone
- Coordinates: 9°30′N 11°30′W
- Country: Sierra Leone
- Province: Northern Province
- Capital: Bendugu
- Largest city: Bendugu

Government
  - Type: District Council
  - District Council Chairman: Abdulai Maranda Sajor (APC)

Area
  - Total: 7,423 km^{2} (2,866 sq mi)

Population (2018 estimate)
  - Total: 205,353
  - Density: 27.66/km^{2} (71.65/sq mi)
- Time zone: UTC0 (Greenwich Mean Time)

Falaba District is a district in the Northern Province of Sierra Leone. It is one of the sixteen districts of Sierra Leone. Its capital and largest town is Bendugu. Other towns in Falaba District include Falaba, Dankawalie, Sikunia, Krubola, Musaia Ganya and Mansadu. Falaba District is divided into thirteen chiefdoms. Falaba District is one of the largest districts in Sierra Leone by land area, However, it is one of the least populous districts in the country. Falaba District is known for its mostly conservative Muslim population. Falaba District has a population of 205,353, based on 2018 estimate.

In 2016, Falaba District was created out of Koinadugu District, and declared a newly created district by then Sierra Leone president Ernest Bai Koroma, and was ratified by the Parliament of Sierra Leone to officially become a district in the same year. Falaba District is one of the two newest districts created by the Government of Sierra Leone, along with Karene District. Falaba District borders Koinadugu District, Bombali District, Kono District and the Republic of Guinea.

Falaba District is an entirely rural district that is composed of mostly farming, livestock and mining. Many of the towns and villages in Falaba District are in far distance and remote areas within the district.

The main ethnic groups in Falaba District are the Kuranko, Yalunka, Fula and Mandingo. Falaba District is home to the largest population of ethnic Yalunka in Sierra Leone.

The overwhelming majority (an estimated 95%) of the people of Falaba District are Muslims of the Sunni tradition of Islam. Large number of Islamic schools, commonly known as Madrasa, are found throughout Falaba District. Falaba District is known for its mostly religious Muslim population. Falaba District has the largest percentage of Muslims in Sierra Leone, and is one of two Districts in Sierra Leone where Muslims make up over 90% of the population (along with its neighbor Koinadugu District). Falaba District is home, however, to a small but significant Christian minority at about 5%. There are several Catholic and Protestants churches in the District.

== Government and politics ==
Politically, Falaba District is a swing district as it is home to a large percentage of supporters of Sierra Leone's two major political parties: the Sierra Leone People's Party (SLPP) and the All People's Congress (APC).

At the local government, Falaba District is governed by a directly elected district council, headed by a directly elected district council charman, in whom local executive power is granted. The current district council chairman of Falaba District is Abdulai Maranda Sajor, of the All People's Congress who was elected district council chairman of Falaba District with 45.8% of the vote, as he narrowly defeated the Sierra Leone People's Party's candidate in the 2018 Falaba District council elections.

The chiefdoms' paramount chiefs of Falaba District are very powerful and extremely influential, especially in village within Falaba District. The Paramount chiefs usually resolve family dispute and minor crimes.

In the 2018 Sierra Leone Presidential election, Samura Kamara of then ruling All People's Congress received 57% of the votes in Falaba District, and Julius Maada Bio of then major opposition Sierra Leone People's Party received 42% of the votes in Falaba District.

After the 2018 Sierra Leone Parliamentary election, Falaba District currently has four elected representatives in the Sierra Leone Parliament, and they are Mohamed Billow Shaw (SLPP), Alusine Marah (APC), Alhasan Jeroh Kamara (APC), and Lahai Marah (APC).

== Administrative divisions ==
=== Chiefdoms ===
After the 2017 local administrative reorganization, Falaba District has made up of thirteen chiefdoms as the third level of administrative subdivision.

Prior to the 2017 local administrative reorganization, Dembelia Sikunia, Folasaba, Mongo, Neya and Sulima Chiefdoms were formerly from Koinadugu District.

1. Delemandugu (Note: Formerly part of Mongo Chiefdom.) – ?
2. Dembelia (Note: Formerly part of Folasaba Chiefdom.) – Musaia
3. Dembelia Sikunia – Sikunia
4. Folasaba – ?
5. Kamadu Yiraia (Note: Formerly part of Sengbe Chiefdom from Koinadugu District before splitting off.) – ?
6. Kebelia (Note: Formerly part of Sulima Chiefdom.) – ?
7. Kulor Saradu (Note: Formerly part of Neya Chiefdom.) – ?
8. Mongo – Bendugu
9. Morfindugu – ?
10. Neya – Krubola
11. Nyedu – ?
12. Sulima – Falaba
13. Wollay Barawa (Note: Formerly part of Nieni Chiefdom from Koinadugu District before splitting off.) – ?

== Law enforcement and safety ==
The Sierra Leone Police is the primary law enforcement agency and crimes investigation in Falaba District. However, the Paramount chiefs and the traditional council also investigate minor crimes and solve family and community conflict in Falaba District. The Paramount chiefs are very influential within their chiefdoms in Falaba District.
