= Nieni Chiefdom =

Nieni
- Chiefdom
- Interactive map of Nieni
- Country: Sierra Leone
- Province: Northern Province
- District: Koinadugu District
- Capital: Yiffin

Population (2004)
  - Total: 39,107
- Time zone: UTC+0 (GMT)

Nieni is a chiefdom in Koinadugu District of Sierra Leone with a population of 39,107. Its principal town is Yiffin.
