= Madina, Port Loko District =

Madina is a settlement in Constituency 54 of Port Loko District in the Northern Province, Sierra Leone.
