= Pujehun Central Mosque =

Mosque in Pujehun, Southern, Sierra Leone

- Location within Sierra Leone

Religion
- Affiliation: Islam
- Ecclesiastical or organizational status: Mosque
- Leadership: Sheikh Alhaji Ahmed Jalloh (Chief Imam)
- Status: Active

Location
- Location: Pujehun, Pujehun District
- Country: Sierra Leone
- Interactive map of Pujehun Central Mosque
- Coordinates: 7°21′16.9″N 11°43′12.6″W

Architecture
- Type: Mosque

The Pujehun Central Mosque is a mosque in the town of Pujehun, in the Pujehun District of southern Sierra Leone. The mosque is also the seat of various Islamic cultural events.

The Chief Imam of the mosque is Sheik Alhaji Ahmed Jalloh.

== See also ==
- Islam in Sierra Leone
- List of mosques in Africa
