= Moyamba District =

- Location of Moyamba District in Sierra Leone
- Coordinates: 8°00′N 12°30′W
- Country: Sierra Leone
- Province: Province
- Capital: Moyamba
- Largest city: Moyamba

Government
  - Type: District Council
  - District Council Chairman: Joseph Benedict Mbogba (SLPP)
  - Deputy District Council Chairman: Alfred Brima Banya(SLPP)

Area
  - Total: 6,902 km^{2} (2,665 sq mi)

Population (2015 census)
  - Total: 318,064
  - Density: 46.08/km^{2} (119.4/sq mi)
- Time zone: UTC-5 (Greenwich Mean Time)
- HDI (2017): 0.364 low · 12th

Moyamba District is a district in the Southern Province of Sierra Leone, with a population of 318,064 in the 2015 census. Its capital and largest city is Moyamba. The other major towns include Njala, Rotifunk and Shenge. The district is the largest in the Southern Province by geographical area, occupying a total area of 6,902 km^{2} (2,665 sq mi) and comprises fourteen chiefdoms.

Moyamba District borders the Atlantic Ocean in the west, Port Loko District and Tonkolili District to the north, Bo District to the east and Bonthe District to the south. The main economic activities include mining (rutile and bauxite), fishing, rice growing and oil palm plantations.

Moyamba District is one of the most ethnically diverse Districts in Sierra Leone. The Mende people are the largest ethnic group in Moyamba District; However, there is a large population of ethnic minority groups in the district that make up closer to 50% of the District population, including the Temne people, Fulani, Sherbro, Kissi, Mandingo, and Kuranko. Moyamba is home to a significantly large population of ethnic Temne minority, and is home to the largest ethnic Temne population in the Southern Province of Sierra Leone.

Moyamba District is the birthplace of many of the country's highest profile politicians who helped guide the country to independence in 1961 from the United Kingdom, including Milton Margai, Albert Margai, John Karefa-Smart and Siaka Stevens. Politically, Moyamba District is a stronghold of the Sierra Leone People's Party(SLPP), as the vast majority of residents in the District support the SLPP. The SLPP has won every presidential election in Moyamba District including the 1996, 2002, 2007, 2012 and 2018 Sierra Leone presidential elections.

== Administrative divisions ==
=== Chiefdoms ===
Since the 2017 local administrative reorganization, Moyamba District has been made up of fourteen chiefdoms as the third level of administrative subdivision.

List of chiefdoms and their capitals:

1. Bagruwa – Sembehun
2. Bumpe – Rotifunk
3. Dasse – Mano
4. Fakunya – Gandohun
5. Kagboro – Shenge
6. Kaiyamba – Moyamba
7. Kamajei – Senehun
8. Kongbora – Bauya
9. Kori – Taiama
10. Kowa – Njama
11. Lower Banta – Gbangbantoke
12. Ribbi – Bradford
13. Timdale – Bomotoke
14. Upper Banta – Mokelle

== Religion ==
Religion in Eastern Province (2015)
Religion	Percent(%)
Islam	74.2%
Christianity	24.9%
Baháʼí	0.0%
Traditional African religions	0.0%
Other	0.4%
No religion	0.4%

== Notable people ==
- Banja Tejan-Sie, Sierra Leone chief justice, speaker of the house of parliament and attorney general from 1967 to 1968.
- Ella Koblo Gulama - Paramount Chief of Kaiyamba Chiefdom and Sierra Leone's first woman minister of parliament, a first woman cabinet minister.
- John Akar, Sierra Leonean diplomat, speaker, and lyricist.
- John Karefa-Smart, one of Sierra Leone's most prominent political figure and leader of the United National People's Party
- Julius Gulama, educator and Paramount Chief of Kaiyamba chiefdom.
- Kadi Sesay, politician, pro-democracy advocate and the vice presidential candidate of the Sierra Leone People's Party (SLPP).
- Komeh Gulama Lansana, socialite.
- Lucy Gulama, Chief consort of Paramount Chief Julius Gulama.
- Madam Yoko, ruler of the Kpa Mende Confederacy.
- Momoh Gulama, Paramount Chief of Kaiyamba chiefdom.
- Siaka Stevens, first President of Sierra Leone.
- Sir Albert Margai, attorney-at-law who became the second Prime Minister of Sierra Leone from 1964 to 1967
- Sir Milton Margai, a medical doctor who led Sierra Leone to independence in 1961, and became the nation's first prime minister from 1961 to 1964.
- Solomon G. Seisay - Sierra Leone's first indigenous National Director of Prisons.
- Tinga Seisay, Sierra Leonean diplomat and pro-democracy activist.
- Thomas Caulker (1846–1859)
