= List of districts of Sierra Leone by Human Development Index =

List of Sierra Leone districts by HDI (2022)

This is a list of districts of Sierra Leone by Human Development Index as of 2023.

Rank	District	HDI (2023)
Medium human development
1	Western Urban	0.586
Low human development
2	Western Rural	0.506
3	Bombali	0.467
–	Sierra Leone	0.467
4	Bo	0.456
5	Kono	0.451
6	Kailahun	0.446
7	Bonthe	0.441
8	Kenema	0.444
9	Tonkolili	0.435
10	Kambia	0.433
11	Koinadugu	0.426
12	Moyamba	0.425
13	Port Loko	0.424
14	Pujehun	0.414
