= Subdivisions of Sierra Leone =

The subdivisions of Sierra Leone are as follows:

First level

- 4 provinces
- 1 area

Second level

- 16 districts

Third level

- 190 chiefdoms

== Provinces ==
The provinces and area of Sierra Leone

Sierra Leone is divided into 4 provinces and a Western Area for the capital Freetown.

- Eastern Province
- Northern Province
- North West Province
- Southern Province
- Western Area

== Districts ==
The districts of Sierra Leone

The provinces of Sierra Leone are divided into 16 districts. 14 are rural, with the capital Freetown divided into 2 districts. One traditional leader from each district occupies a seat in Sierra Leone's parliament.

== Chiefdoms ==
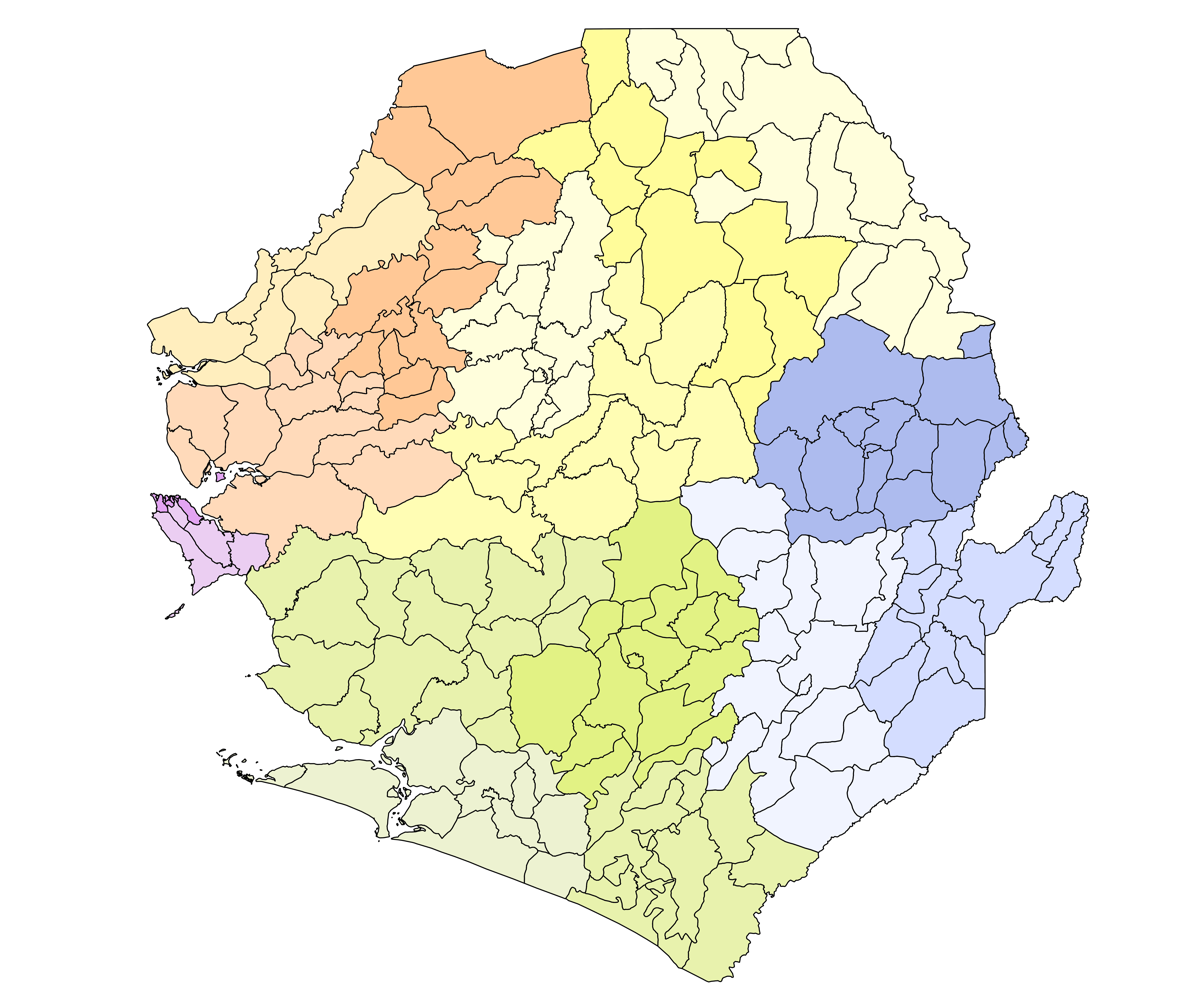
The chiefdoms of Sierra Leone.

As of 2017. Sierra Leone is further divided into 190 chiefdoms, due to the local government reorganization and de-amalgamation process. The chiefdoms are hereditary, tribal units of local governance. The World Bank sponsored the creation of elected local councils in 2004.

Chiefs have the power to "raise taxes, control the judicial system, and allocate land, the most important resource in rural areas."

Prior to the 2017 local government reorganization, Sierra Leone was further divided into 149 chiefdoms.

== See also ==
- Geography of Sierra Leone
