= Outamba-Kilimi National Park =

National park in Sierra Leone

- IUCN category II (national park)
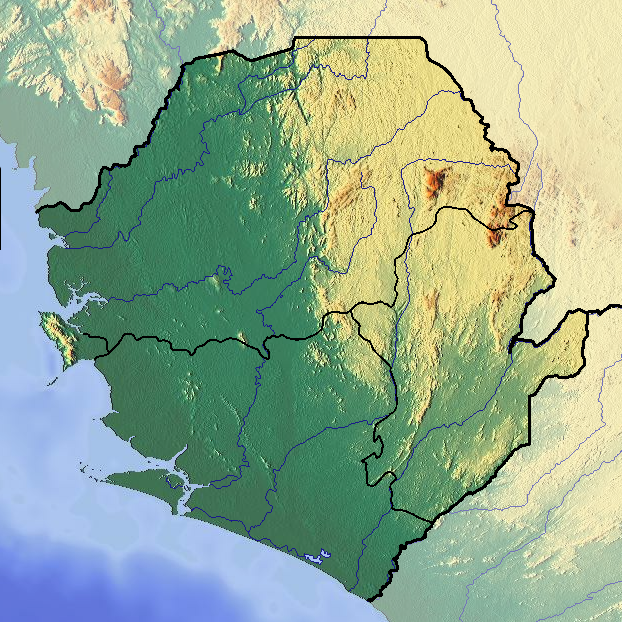
- Location within Sierra Leone
- Location: Karene District, Sierra Leone
- Nearest city: Kabala
- Coordinates: 9°46′10″N 12°01′34″W
- Area: 1,109 km^{2} (428 sq mi)
- Established: 1 January 1986

Outamba-Kilimi National Park is located in the Karene District, in north-west Sierra Leone near the border with Guinea. The park is divided into two areas, Outamba (741 km^{2}) and Kilimi (368 km^{2}). The park is named after its highest peak in one part, Mount Outamba, and its longest river in the other, River Kilimi.

== History ==
The area became a game reserve in 1974, and was formally gazetted as a National Park in October 1995. It was originally chosen for preservation as it contains a large number of chimpanzees.

== Environment ==
The terrain is mainly flat with a few hills and some large rivers flowing south-west. The vegetation is a mosaic of gallery forest, closed woodland and grassland. Outamba is characterised by tall-grass savanna and woodland with patches of closed-canopy forest. Kilimi has more open savanna woodland. Both contain patches of raffia palm swamp forest and riverine grassland.

=== Wildlife ===
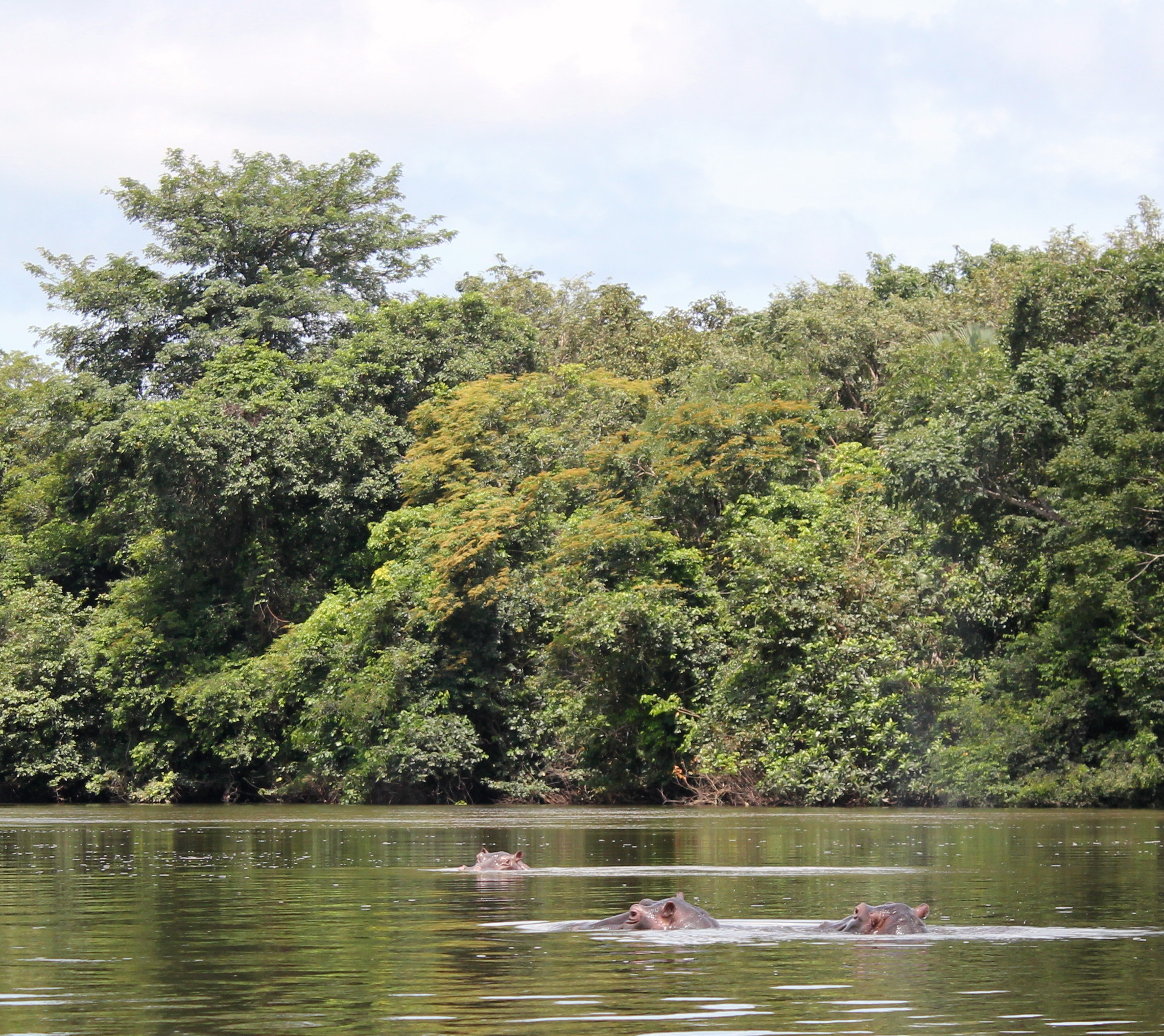
Hippos in Outamba-Kilimi National Park, Sierra Leone

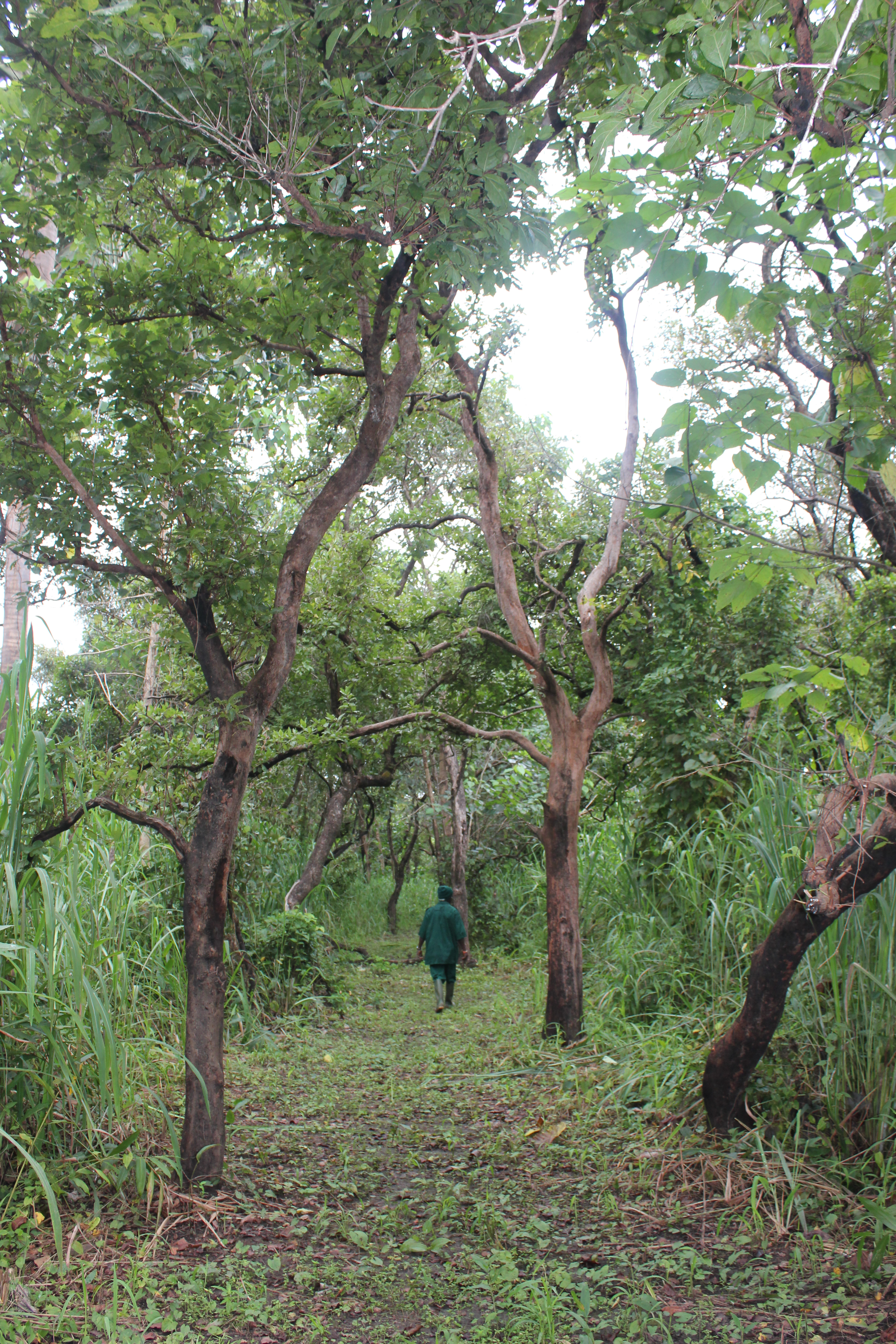
Karangia (Hill of Learning in Susu) Trail in Outamba-Kilimi National Park, Sierra Leone

Wildlife includes primates such as western chimpanzees, colobus monkeys and sooty mangabeys; hippopotamuses and pygmy hippos; forest elephants; common warthogs; rare bongo antelopes and over a hundred species of birds. The park has been designated an Important Bird Area (IBA) by BirdLife International because it supports significant populations of many bird species. The UN Environment Programme lists the Outamba Area as protected. More information can be seen as a map.

== Susu ==
The Susu (or Soso) tribe live in and around the park and most park personnel are Susu. Some villages were originally in the park itself, but most agreed to move to the buffer zone. An exception was made for those who had ancestral sites and graves within the park. Those who remain have agreed to only harvest using sustainable methods. Mining and hunting are prohibited. The National Tourism Board is attempting to increase tourism in an effect to compensate them for the loss of revenue.

=== Buffer zone ===
There is a 1 km buffer zone around the park, where most of the villages are. Restrictions are fewer here: hunting is allowed, except for certain protected species; farming is practiced and areas of gmelina trees have been planted to replace the parkland as a source of wood for use as firewood and in making furniture and housing.

== Facilities ==
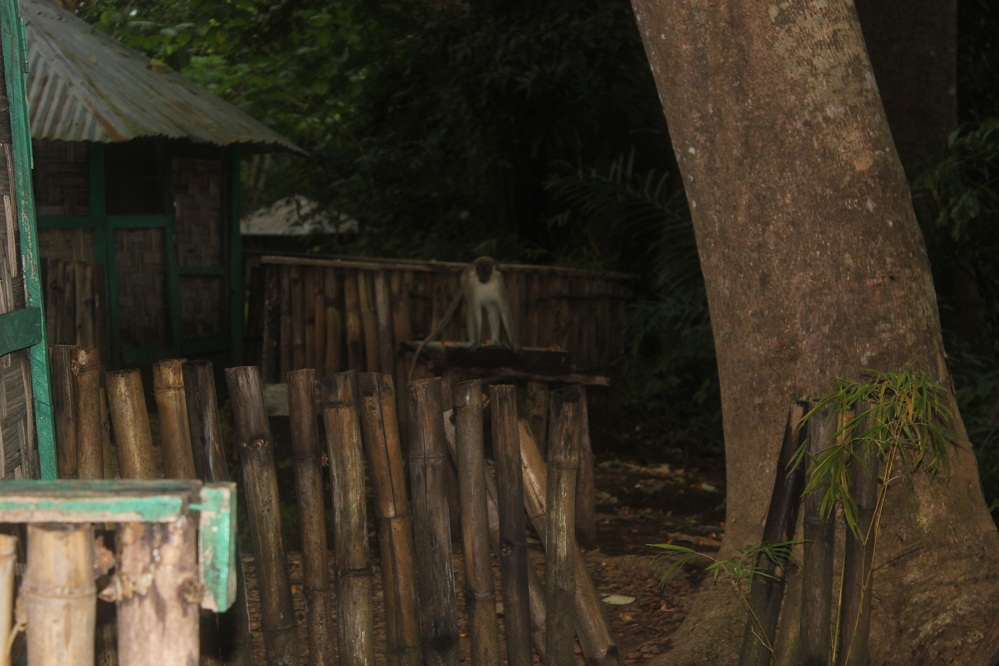
A community of green monkeys commute over the guests in Outamba-Kilimi National Park, Sierra Leone.

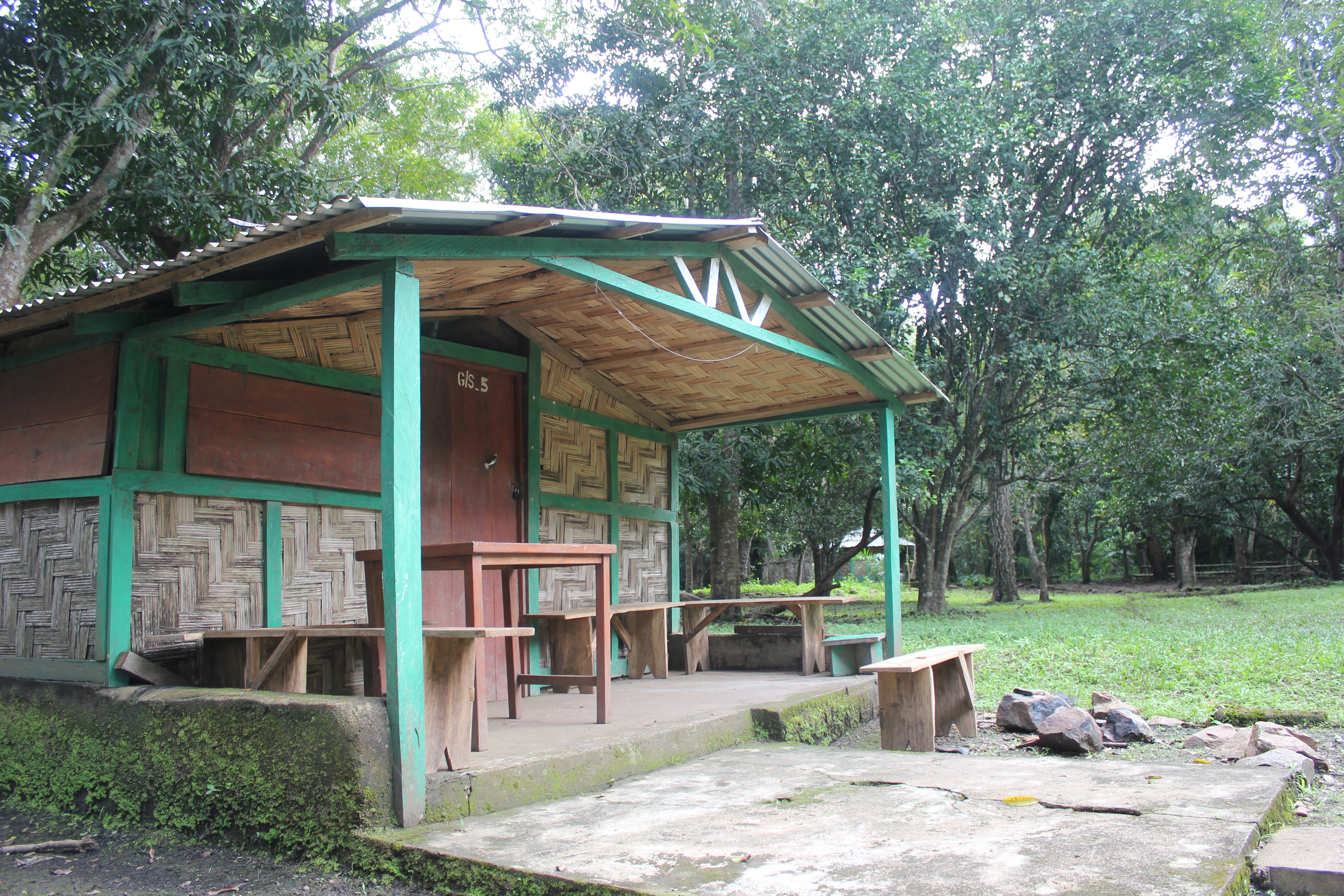
Group Hut in Outamba-Kilimi Park, Sierra Leone

Simple one bed and group huts are available for visitors to the park. These are made using local materials.
