= Petifu =

Town in the Port Loko District of Sierra Leone

Coordinates: 08°49′21″N 13°07′30″W

Petifu is a rural town in Port Loko District in the Northern Province of Sierra Leone. Petifu lies about 32 km (20 miles) from Lungi. The town population is predominantly from the Susu, Temne and Fula ethnic group. The town is predominantly Muslim.

== History ==
Petifu was founded by Susu and Fula migrants from present-day Guinea. They arrived in that part of Sierra Leone during the 17th century. The Fula and Susu met the Temne people who were already living in the town. These three groups lived together and gave the town the name Petifu, made up from two of the three languages Susu and Temne: "Pet", which means a place outside the bush in the Temne language and "Fu", which means new in the Susu language.
