= Kamakwie =

- Location in Sierra Leone
- Coordinates: 9°30′N 12°14′W
- Country: Sierra Leone
- Province: North West Province
- District: Karene District
- Chiefdom: Sella Limba

Population (2010 estimate)
  - Total: 8,098 Leone/02/Kamakwie/
- Time zone: UTC-5 (GMT)

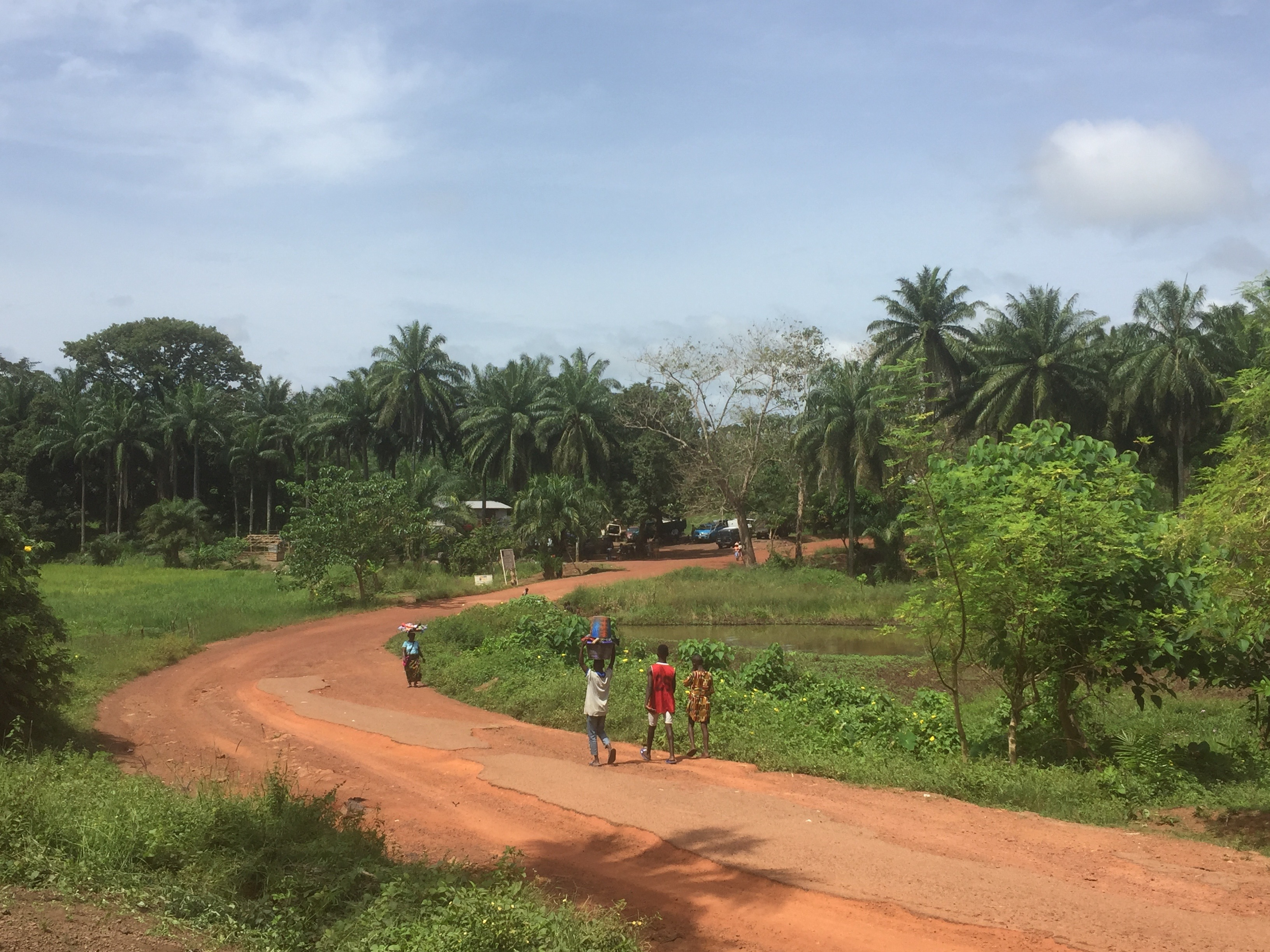
Street of Kamakwie - Sierra Leone, Westafrica

Kamakwie is a town in the North West Province of Sierra Leone. Since 2017 Kamakwie is the Capital of the Karene District in Chiefdom Sella Limba. The population of the town as estimated in late 2010, is 8,098 . The main economic activities of Kamakwie are trading and farming.

The population of Kamakwie is predominantly from the Limba ethnic groups. Kamakwie is a religiously diverse town as it is home to a large population of both Muslims and Christians. The Christians of Kamakwie are mostly Wesleyan Methodist. Unlike most parts of the North of Sierra Leone, Christian missionaries had large success in converting many local people of Kamakwie into Christianity. As with most parts of Sierra Leone, the Krio language of the Sierra Leone Creole people is the most widely spoken language in Kamakwie.

== Education ==
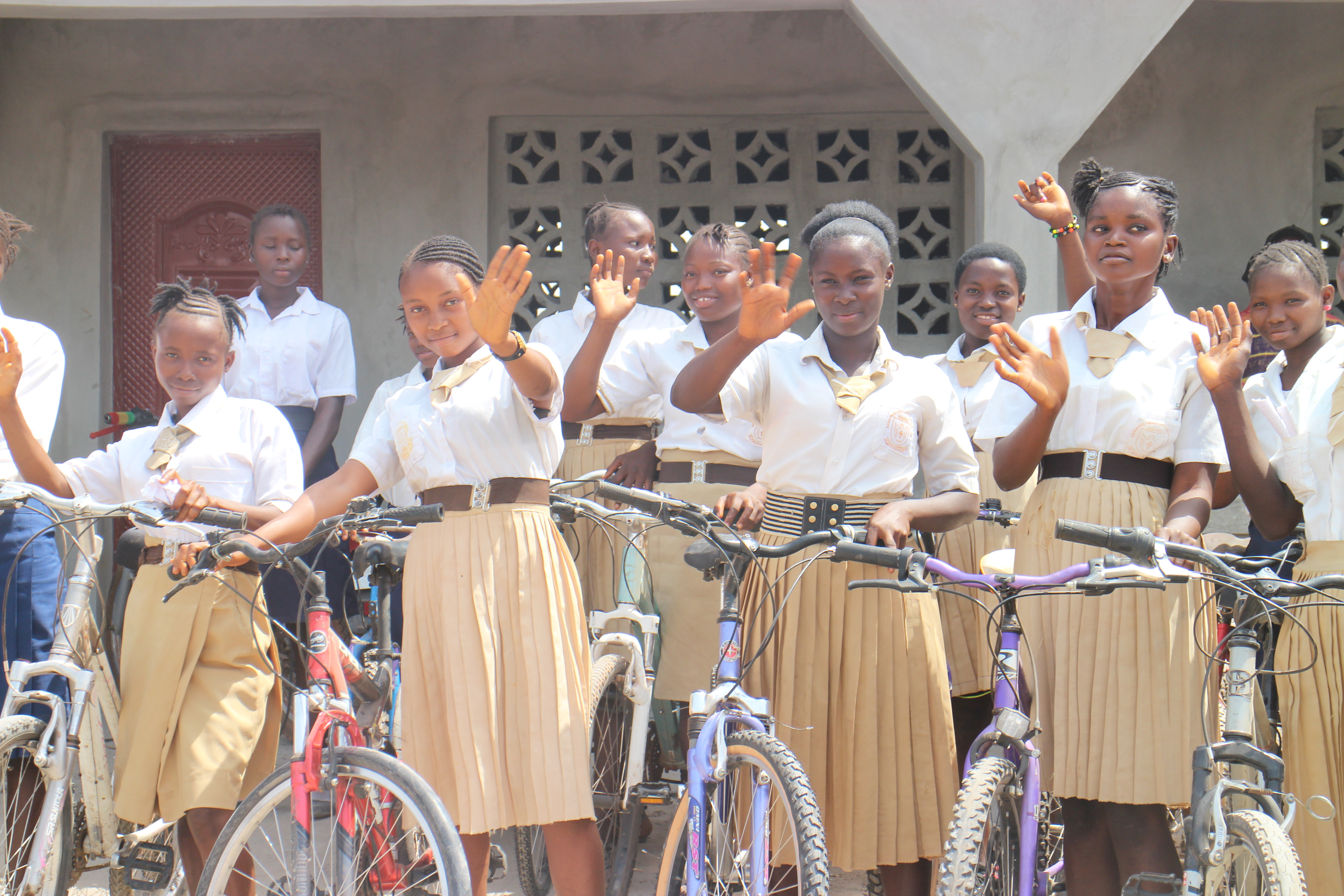
Donation of bicycles to boost education in rural Kamakwie.

Kamakwie has five primary schools and five secondary schools (Kamakwie Wesleyan Secondary School, Islamic Secondary School, Model Secondary School, St Peters Secondary School and Every Nation Secondary School). Also a "Sella Vocational Center" (SEVOC).

== Hospital ==
The local hospital is run by the Wesleyan Church.

== Charities ==
A charity organization called We Yone Child Foundation-Sierra Leone working in Kamakwie on street children, orphans, women, child trafficking, HIV/AIDS affected children, women, young people and other vulnerable children. They help provide basis needs and supplies, livelihood empowerment skills programs, and shelter in the form of orphanage for homeless children.

The SEVOC is supported by the German foundation "Mahmoo e.V."
