= Sembehun =

- Location in Sierra Leone
- Coordinates: 7°46′39″N 11°43′32″W
- Country: Sierra Leone
- Province: Southern Province
- District: Bo District
- Time zone: UTC-5 (GMT)

Sembehun is a town in Bo District, in the Southern Province of Sierra Leone. The Mende predominate in the town. Sembehun was the Kamajors stronghold during the Sierra Leone civil war.
