= Ndogboyosoi War =

1982 political conflict in Sierra Leone

Date	1982
Location	Sierra Leone (mainly in Pujehun District)
Result	Indecisive: Indirect contribution to the rise of the Revolutionary United Front

Belligerents
All People's Congress (APC)	Sierra Leone People's Party (SLPP)

Commanders and leaders
Solomon Demby	Mana Kpaka

The Ndogboyosoi War, also known as the Ndorgborwusui War, Ndorbgowusui War, Ndorgboryosoi War or Bush Devil War, was an episode of political violence that occurred in 1982 between supporters of the All People's Congress (APC) and the Sierra Leone People's Party (SLPP) in Sierra Leone. The violence was centered in Pujehun District, especially in the Soro-Gbema chiefdom. It was triggered by the ruling APC party's alleged electoral manipulation and the intervention of a special squad of customs police against supporters of the SLPP candidate. A local armed uprising erupted after a senior APC politician rigged elections in the district and threatened to punish the people of Soro-Gbema, who cried foul at the electoral fraud-may.

There was no process of reconciliation following the violence. Children of those killed in the fighting or of those who died in detention were among the first to join the Revolutionary United Front (RUF), a rebel group which began a civil war in eastern and southern Sierra Leone nine years later. Quite a few number of people were linked to the Ndogboyosoi war of 1982 may have joined the RUF enthusiastically, beguiled by the rebels' anti-APC rhetoric. One such figure, and one who was to become notorious in the RUF, was Momoh Konneh. When the RUF entered Soro-Gbema in 1991, the people of Pujehun joined the rebellion thinking that the activities of the RUF were a continuation of the 1982 insurgency.
