= Gbangbatoke =

Moyamba District in the Southern province of Sierra Leone

Gbangbatoke is a small town in Moyamba District in the Southern province of Sierra Leone. The town is best known for being the birthplace of two of Sierra Leone's most prominent politicians, Sir Milton Margai and Sir Albert Margai. The population of Gbangbatoke is predominantly from the Mende ethnic group, and the Mende language is widely spoken.
