= Gbinti =

- Location in Sierra Leone
- Coordinates: 8°58′N 12°36′W
- Country: Sierra Leone
- Province: North West Province
- District: Karene District
- Time zone: UTC-5 (GMT)

Gbinti is a rural town in Dibia chiefdom, Karene District in the North West Province of Sierra Leone. The town is the chieftaincy seat of Dibia chiefdom. Gbinti lies about 20 miles from the district capital Port Loko and approximately 52 miles east of Freetown.

The inhabitant of Gbinti are largely from the ethnic group of Fula descent, who had settled in the town as settlers over a hundred and fifty years ago. The Temne language is widely spoken in the town along with the Krio language.

The population of Gbinti is almost entirely Muslim. Gbinti has a number of primary school and one secondary school called the Gbinti Secondary School. There is one police station in the town run by the Sierra Leone Police Port Loko District Division.

== Family Root ==
Gbinti is the homeland of the Bundu Family, the Wurie Family, the Jah Family, the Dalaba Sesay Family and the Dainkeh Family all of this Families are members of Fulani clan.

== Notable people born or descendant from Gbinti ==
- Abass Bundu, Sierra Leonean politician and diplomat
- Amadu Wurie, early Sierra Leonean educationist and politician
- Ibrahim Bundu, Sierra Leonean politician
- Rashid Wurie, former Sierra Leonean international footballer
- Neneh Cherry, Swedish Singer, her Father and Fathers family are from Gbinti
