= Pujehun =

Pujehun, Sierra Leone
- Location in Sierra Leone
- Coordinates: 7°21′2″N 11°43′5″W
- Country: Sierra Leone
- Province: Southern Province
- District: Pujehun District

Population (current estimate)
  - Total: 20,121
- Time zone: UTC-5 (GMT)

Pujehun is the capital of Pujehun District in the Southern Province. The current estimate of the population of Pujehun is 20,121 people.

Pujehun is a rural town and is the commercial and administrative center of Pujehun District. Pujehun lies about 50 miles south of Bo, and about 200 miles -south-east of Freetown. The inhabitants of Pujehun are largely from the Mende ethnic group, although like with virtually all areas in Sierra Leone, the Krio language of the Sierra Leone Creole people is the most widely spoken.

== History ==
Pujehun was named after the powerful Mende warrior Nyagua, who was residing at the nearby village of Panguma. When Nyagua and his men went to battle, they used the site of the present village as their resting place. At that time There was a lot of pepper growing in the town, which the Mende call "pujei." At any time they reached that area, they called it Pujehun. Pujehun was initially known as Gombu and later change to present day name possibly because of the pepper (pujei) growing history.

== Population ==
The majority of the population in Pujehun are from the Mende ethnic group. Most of the residents are Muslims and the town hosts the Pujehun Central Mosque.
