= Madam Yoko =

Leader of the Mende people in Sierra Leone

Madam Yoko or Mammy Yoko (ca. 1849–1906) was a leader of the Mende people in Sierra Leone. Combining advantageous lineage, shrewd marriage choices and the power afforded her from the secret Sande society, Yoko became a leader of considerable influence. She expanded the Mende Kingdom and at the time of her death, she was the ruler of the vast Kpa Mende Confederacy.

== Biography ==
Madam Yoko, as a child called Soma, was born in 1849 in Gbo Chiefdomi. She had three brothers Ali Kongo, Lamboi, and Goba. Her father was a warrior in the outward land. At puberty she was initiated into the Sande Society, where she was instructed in singing, dancing, medicine, and childbearing, along with other roles associated with being a wife and mother. After training for months, she was reintroduced into society as an adult with the name Madam Yoko.

Madam Yoko married her first husband Gongoima, a warrior, and it is said that he may have been her cousin through her father. Yoko left Gongoima in the mid 1800’s because of his increase in jealousy and suspicion. Madam Yoko married her second husband Gbenje, he was a son of another Kpe Mende pioneer warrior and Chief of Taiamav. Yoko was Gbenje’s “junior wife” but, because of Yoko’s responsibility and her being able, Gbenje moved her up to senior wife. Gbneje grew sick and died, and Yoko underwent purification ceremonies for preparation to be remarried.

Yoko remarried a powerful war chief named Gbanya Lango and because of his conflict with the British, Gbanya was arrested and Yoko was able to get him out by making a personal appeal to the governor. This is how Yoko got her start in politics. After getting her husband released, Gbanya used Yoko in diplomatic missions with the British, which helped her to gain and develop her reputation as a political figure. Gbanya also elevated Yoko up to “head wife” because of her hand in getting him released and aiding him in wealth through farming.vii When Gbanya died in 1878, Yoko succeeded him and became the “Queen of Sennehoo”.

Madam Yoko rose to power in the late 19th century. While in power she unified and led a confederacy of Kpa Mende. She was able to gain control of all Kpa Mende (fourteen separate chiefdoms) by making alliances and using judicious force. Yoko used the Sande society by establishing a famous Sande Bush in Senehun to aid her in making her alliances. She did this by receiving young women through initiations where she trained them and then gave them away as a wife to leading men. Yoko’s Sande Bush gained so much popularity that mothers strove to get their daughters into her Bush. This was quite different from male chiefs; where Yoko was able to train the women and give them away in marriage, male chiefs were only able to receive a wife from a family. Yoko was also different from male chiefs in that she had the ability to make alliances with men by using the gift of sexuality directly, while male chiefs had to use women to make an alliance with another man. Male chiefs would also create alliances by taking daughters from a hundred or more leading families and marry them. This was a tactic Yoko could have used if she were a man. Madam Yoko also made alliances with the British through her Sande Bush. She invited British officials to her town and had her Sande dancers dance for them. She also gave wives to native officers of the Frontier Police. Yoko also used her alliances with the British to help her advance in power, as mentioned in” Women, Culture and Society” Yoko was feared because she could call on the British. Yoko’s power also advanced through her use of manipulation on the British. For example, she had told the British that another chief and her rivalry, Kamanda, was allied with” a group of raiding Temne warriors". As a result, the British put the Temne down and deported their leaders and Kamanda.

Aside from her ability to make alliances, it is said that Madam Yoko was extraordinarily strong in battle. It has been said that she used nearby rivers as a defense system and used a sword in defense against her enemies.

In 1898, the British declared their Protectorate and a law was put in place ordering all chiefs to collect “5-shilling tax on every house in the land”. Yoko ordered her subchiefs to pay the new taxes. However, the people rebelled and blamed her for “spoiling the country” because of her support for the British. Instead of turning on the British to gain control of her people and popularity, she hid out in police barracks while her people tried to attack. As a result of her loyalty to the British she was awarded a silver medal by Queen Victoria. Madam Yoko ruled as Paramount Chief until 1906 when she committed suicide. Yoko did not have any children, so her brother Lamboi succeeded her.
