= Bradford, Sierra Leone =

Town in Sierra Leone

Coordinates: 08°18′00″N 12°45′00″W

Bradford (Krio: Bradfɔd) is a town in Sierra Leone located near the capital of Sierra Leone, Freetown.

== Transport ==
The city was formerly served by a railway station on the Sierra Leone Government Railway.

== See also ==
- Railway stations in Sierra Leone
