= Port Loko District =

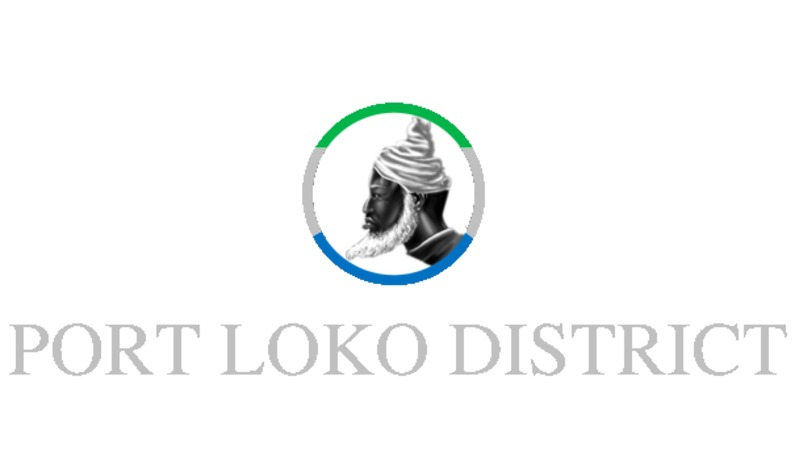
- Flag

- Location of Port Loko District in Sierra Leone
- Coordinates: 8°45′N 12°40′W
- Country: Sierra Leone
- Province: North West
- Capital: Port Loko
- Largest city: Lunsar

Government
  - Type: District Council
  - District Council Chairman: Ibrahim Santigie Bangura (APC)

Area
  - Total: 5,719 km^{2} (2,208 sq mi)

Population (2015 census)
  - Total: 614,063
  - Rank: 4th
  - Density: 107.4/km^{2} (278.1/sq mi)
- Time zone: UTC-5 (Greenwich Mean Time)
- HDI (2017): 0.388 low · 9th

Port Loko District is a district in the North West Province of Sierra Leone. It is the most populous district in the North and the second most populous district in Sierra Leone, after Western Area Urban District. As of the 2015 census, Port Loko District has a population of 614,063. The district capital is the town of Port Loko and its largest city is Lunsar. The other major towns in the district include Masiaka, Rokupr, Pepel, Lungi and Gbinti.

The district of Port Loko borders the Western Area to the west, Kambia District to the north, Bombali District to the east and Tonkolili District to the south. The district occupies a total area of 5,719 km^{2} (2,208 sq mi) and comprises eleven chiefdoms. The population of Port Loko District is predominantly Muslim and the Temne people form by far the largest ethnic group in the district.

== Religion ==
Religion in Port Loko District (2015)
| Religion | Percent(%) |
| Islam | 92.8% |
| Christianity | 5.9% |
| Baháʼí | 0.0% |
| African Traditional Religion | 0.0% |
| Other | 0.5% |
| No religion | 0.8% |

== Administrative divisions ==
=== Chiefdoms ===
==== Pre-2017 ====
Prior to the 2017 local administrative reorganization, Port Loko District was made up of eleven chiefdoms as the third level of administrative subdivision.

1. Bureh Kaseh – Mange
2. Buya Romende – Foredugu
3. Debia – Gbinti
4. Kaffu Bullom – Mahera
5. Loko Massama – Petifu
6. Maforki – Port Loko
7. Marampa – Lunsar
8. Masimera – Masimera
9. Koya – Songo
10. Sanda Magbolontor – Sendugu
11. T.M. Safroko – Miraykulay

==== Post-2017 ====
After the 2017 local administrative reorganization, Port Loko District has made up of fourteen chiefdoms as the third level of administrative subdivision.

1. Bakeh Loko (Note: Formerly part of Maforki Chiefdom.) – ?
2. Bureh (Note: Formerly part of Bureh Kaseh Chiefdom; split off.) – Mange
3. Kaffu Bullom – Mahera
4. Kamasondo (Note: Formerly part of Loko Massama Chiefdom.) – ?
5. Kaseh – ?
6. Koya – Songo
7. Loko Massama – Petifu
8. Maconteh – ?
9. Maforki – ?
10. Makama (Note: Formerly part of T.M. Safroko Chiefdom; split off.) – Miraykulay
11. Marampa – Lunsar
12. Masimera – Masimera
13. Tinkatopa – ?
14. Port Loko City – Port Loko

=== Major towns ===
- Lunsar
- Port Loko
- Rokupr
- Masiaka
- Lungi
- Pepel
- Gbinti

=== Small towns and villages ===
- Bamundu
- Gbinti
- Kasseh, the birthplace of Bai Bureh
- Konaridie
- Magbeni
- Mahera
- Marampa
- Masiyila
- Semanu
- Sawkta
- Taiama

== Notable people from Port Loko District ==
- Alie Koblo Queen Kabia II, 44th Paramount Chief of Marampa Chiefdom.
- Bai Bureh, Sierra Leonean ruler who led the Temne uprising against the British in The 1898 Rebellion
- Bai Koblo Pathbana II CBE, 43rd Paramount Chief of Marampa Chiefdom.
- Sorie Ibrahim Koroma, Vice President of Sierra Leone from 1971 to 1985
- Abass Bundu, Sierra Leonean Politician
- Ibrahim Kemoh Sesay, Former Sierra Leone's minister of Transportation and Aviation
- Amadu Wurie, Sierra Leonean Educationist and Politician
- Abou Bai-Sheka, Sierra Leonean Professor

== Sources ==
- "Members of Parliament".State House Online.Office of the Sierra Leone President.Web
