= Northern Province, Sierra Leone =

Province of Sierra Leone

Northern Province Nɔtan Prɔvins
- Province
- Coordinates: 9°15′N 11°45′W
- Country: Sierra Leone
- Capital: Makeni

Area
  - Total: 22,605 km^{2} (8,728 sq mi)

Population (2021 census)
  - Total: 1,316,831
  - Density: 58.254/km^{2} (150.88/sq mi)
- Time zone: UTC0 (Greenwich Mean Time)
- ISO 3166 code: SL-N

The Northern Province (Krio: Nɔtan Prɔvins) (commonly referred to as Northern Sierra Leone or simply the North) is one of the five provincial divisions of Sierra Leone. It is located in the Northern geographic region of Sierra Leone. It comprises the following four Districts: Bombali, Falaba, Koinadugu and Tonkolili. The Northern Province has been divided into two Provinces Northwestern Province and Northern Province, today Northern Province covers an area of 22,605 km^{2} (8,728 sq mi) with a population of 1,316,831, based on the 2021 Sierra Leone national census. It is by far the largest Province of Sierra-Leone and also the least densely populated Province of the country Its administrative and economic center is Makeni. The North borders the North West Province to the West, the Republic of Guinea to the north-east, the Eastern Province and Southern Province to the south-east.

== Geography ==
=== Overview ===
The Northern province is mainly a hilly wooded area with mountainous area farther inland. The region has ranges of Mountains, Hills, Valleys, and Wetlands; comprising unique and endangered species. The region is a political stronghold of the All People's Congress (APC) political party. The APC currently controls all the elected seats from the North virtually.

=== Districts ===
The four districts of the Northern Province:

- Bombali District, capital Makeni
- Koinadugu District, capital Kabala
- Falaba District, capital Mongo
- Tonkolili District, capital Magburaka

Prior to 2018, the province also included

- Port Loko District, capital Port Loko
- Kambia District, capital Kambia
- Areas of Bombali district which now make up Karene District

=== Borders ===
The Northern Province has the following borders:

- Mamou Region, Guinea: north
- Faranah Region, Guinea: northeast
- Nzérékoré Region, Guinea: east
- North West Province: west
- Eastern Province: south
- Southern Province: southwest

=== Outamba-Kilimi National Park ===
One of the main tourist attraction in the North is the Outamba-Kilimi National Park. The park is one of the most well-known and frequently visited sites in Sierra Leone. The Park is found in the northeastern of Kamakwie in the Bombali District. It is a magical place embedded between two rivers, the Great Scarcies, and the Mongo Rivers. At the park are rare elephants and buffaloes frequently seen following their paths through the dense bush. See the Hippos relaxing in their pools or listen to the songs of the rich bird life and the alarm calls of the various primates while silently paddling along the river in a canoe.

== Ethnic groups ==
The Temne people are the largest ethnic group in Northern Sierra Leone. The Temne form the largest ethnic group in every district in the north except Koinadugu District. Other ethnic groups in Northern Sierra Leone with significant population are the Limba, Kuranko, Mandingo, Loko, the Fula, and Yalunka. They are mostly Muslims and they engage in mainly farming and sometimes fishing.

== Religion ==
Religion in Northern Province (2015)
Religion	Percent (%)
Islam	85.1%
Christianity	13.7%
Baháʼí Faith	0.0%
Traditional African religion	0.0%
Other	0.6%
No religion	0.5%

== See also ==
- Subdivisions of Sierra Leone
