= Southern Province, Sierra Leone =

Province of Sierra Leone

Coordinates: 8°00′N 12°15′W

Southern Province Sawt Prɔvins
- Province
- Country: Sierra Leone
- Capital: Bo

Area
  - Total: 20,226 km^{2} (7,809 sq mi)

Population (2021 census)
  - Total: 1,830,881
  - Density: 90.521/km^{2} (234.45/sq mi)
- Time zone: UTC+0 (Greenwich Mean Time)

The Southern Province (Krio: Sawt Prɔvins) is one of the four provinces of Sierra Leone. It covers an area of 20,226 km² and has a population of 1,830,881 (2021 census). It consists of four districts (Bo, Bonthe, Moyamba, and Pujehun). Its capital and administrative center is Bo, which is also the second largest and second most populated city in Sierra Leone after the nation's capital Freetown. The population of the southern province is largely from the Mende ethnic group.

== Geography ==
=== Districts ===
The province is divided into 4 districts.

- Bo District, capital Bo
- Bonthe District, capital Mattru Jong
- Moyamba District, capital Moyamba
- Pujehun District, capital Pujehun

=== Borders ===
Southern Province has the following borders:

- Western Area: far northwest
- North West Province: northwest
- Northern Province: northeast
- Eastern Province: east
- Grand Cape Mount County, Liberia: southeast

To the south and west of Southern Province is the Atlantic Ocean.

== Ecology ==
Sierra Leone's last remaining stand of rainforest is at Gola.

== Religion ==
Religion in Southern Province (2015)
Religion	Percent(%)
Islam	79.9%
Christianity	19.2%
Baháʼí	0.0%
Traditional African religions	0.0%
Other	0.6%
No religion	0.3%

== See also ==
- Subdivisions of Sierra Leone
