= Districts of Sierra Leone =

The provinces of Sierra Leone are divided into 16 districts, as of July 2017. Previously, the country was divided into 14 districts. The Western Area is divided into two districts. Sierra Leone's capital Freetown is located in the Western Area of the country and its makes up the Western Area Urban District.

One traditional leader from each district occupies a seat in Sierra Leone's parliament. Each one of Sierra Leone's sixteen administrative districts (with the exception of the Western Area Urban District) is governed by a directly elected district council headed by a council chairman. The national capital Freetown, which makes up the Western Area Urban District, and the other is the Western Area Rural with a main town known as Waterloo, is governed by a directly elected city council headed by a mayor. The districts are further divided into a total of 190 (prior to 2017, 149) chiefdoms, whose elected leaders provided most of local government from 1896 to 2004, when they were supplemented by elected local councils.

== List of districts ==
The 16 Districts of Sierra Leone as of 2017

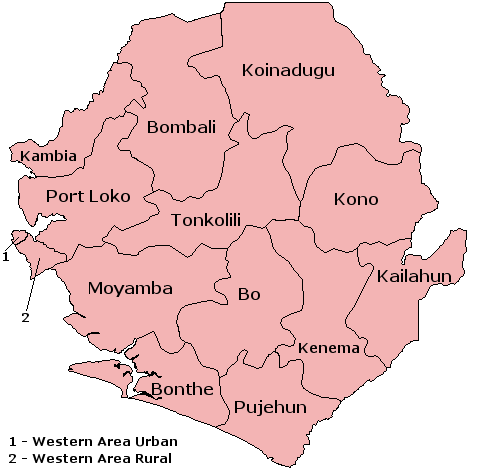
The 14 Districts of Sierra Leone before 2017

District	Province	Capital	Area km^{2} (2013)	Population (2004 census)	Population (2015 census)
Kailahun	Eastern	Kailahun	3,940	358,190	526,379
Kenema	Eastern	Kenema	6,345	497,948	609,891
Kono	Eastern	Koidu Town	5,391	335,401	506,100
Bombali	Northern	Makeni	3,876	408,390	606,544
Falaba	Northern	Bendugu	7,423		205,353
Koinadugu	Northern	Kabala	4,951	265,758	409,372
Tonkolili	Northern	Magburaka	6,288	347,197	531,435
Kambia	North West	Kambia	3,031	270,462	345,474
Karene	North West	Kamakwie	5,828		285,546
Port Loko	North West	Port Loko	5,719	453,746	615,376
Bo	Southern	Bo	5,463	463,668	575,478
Bonthe	Southern	Bonthe	3,547	139,687	200,781
Moyamba	Southern	Moyamba	7,012	260,910	318,588
Pujehun	Southern	Pujehun	4,179	228,392	346,461
Western Rural	Western	Waterloo	1,228	174,249	444,270
Western Urban	Western	Freetown	82	772,873	1,055,964

== See also ==
- Subdivisions of Sierra Leone
- List of districts of Sierra Leone by Human Development Index
