= Provinces of Sierra Leone =

Map of the four provinces and one area in Sierra Leone

Sierra Leone is divided into four provinces (until 2017, three) and one Western Area; these are further divided into 16 districts (previously 14), and the districts are further divided into 190 (previously 149) chiefdoms.

== Provinces and areas ==
Province/Area name	Capital	Area	Population (2015 census)	Population Density
Eastern Province	Kenema	15,676 km^{2} (6,053 sq mi)	1,641,012	110/km^{2} (270/sq mi)
Northern Province (Note: Due to the fact that not much is known, including the area, of this province, most of the information here is basically before the split of the Northern Province.)	Makeni	22,538 km^{2} (8,702 sq mi)	2,502,865	70/km^{2} (180/sq mi)
Southern Province	Bo	20,201 km^{2} (7,800 sq mi)	1,438,572	73/km^{2} (190/sq mi)
North West Province (Note: Due to the little to no information of this province, most of it will just be the pre-2017 Northern Province)	Port Loko	13,527 km^{2} (5,223 sq mi)	1,162,065	70/km^{2} (180/sq mi)
Western Area	Freetown	1,310 km^{2} (510 sq mi)	1,493,252	2,700/km^{2} (6,900/sq mi)

== See also ==
- ISO 3166-2:SL
- Administrative divisions of Sierra Leone
