= Railway stations in Sierra Leone =

Railway stations in Sierra Leone include:

== Maps ==
Railway network of Sierra Leone Black, open & dotted extension proposed. Red; closed 1974

The MSN and FallingRain and UNHCR maps still show the railway lines closed in 1974.

- UN Map of Sierra Leone - no railways shown at all.
- UNHCR Atlas map
- Map on page 24.
- African Mineral iron ore railway Map

== Towns served ==
=== Open ===
- (private 1,067 mm (3 ft 6 in) line)
- (upgraded to 20Mtpa) (Mtpa = Million Tonnes Per Annum?)
- (renewed line to be open access)
- Port Pepel - low capacity port
- Madina
- Lungi Lol
- Makoato
  - Bankasoka River bridge
- Port Loko
- Lunsar - terminus at mine

- Marampa - iron ore mine.
- Makeni
- Bumbuna
- Tonkolili - proposed extension to iron ore deposit

=== Under construction ===
- (new parallel 1,435 mm (4 ft 8 1/2 in) gauge line)
- (capacity 50Mtpa)
- (new line to be open access)
- Tagrin Point proposed high capacity port
- Marampa - iron ore mine.
- Makeni
- Bumbuna
- Tonkolili - proposed extension to iron ore deposit
- Kasafoni - proposed iron ore mine

=== Proposed ===
==== 2013 ====
- Tonkolili - iron ore mine
- Sulima southern port at the mouth of the Moa River.

=== Closed ===
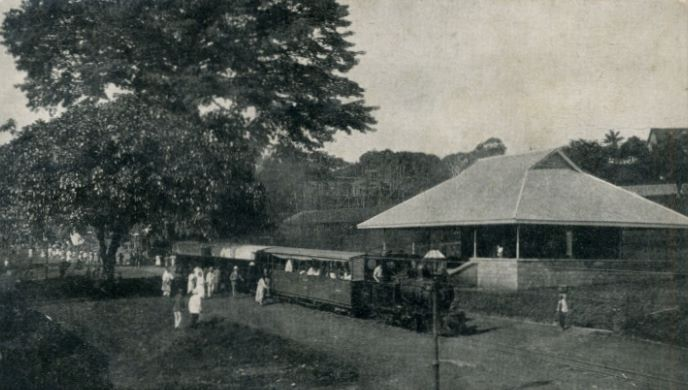
Cotton Tree station, Freetown (1915)

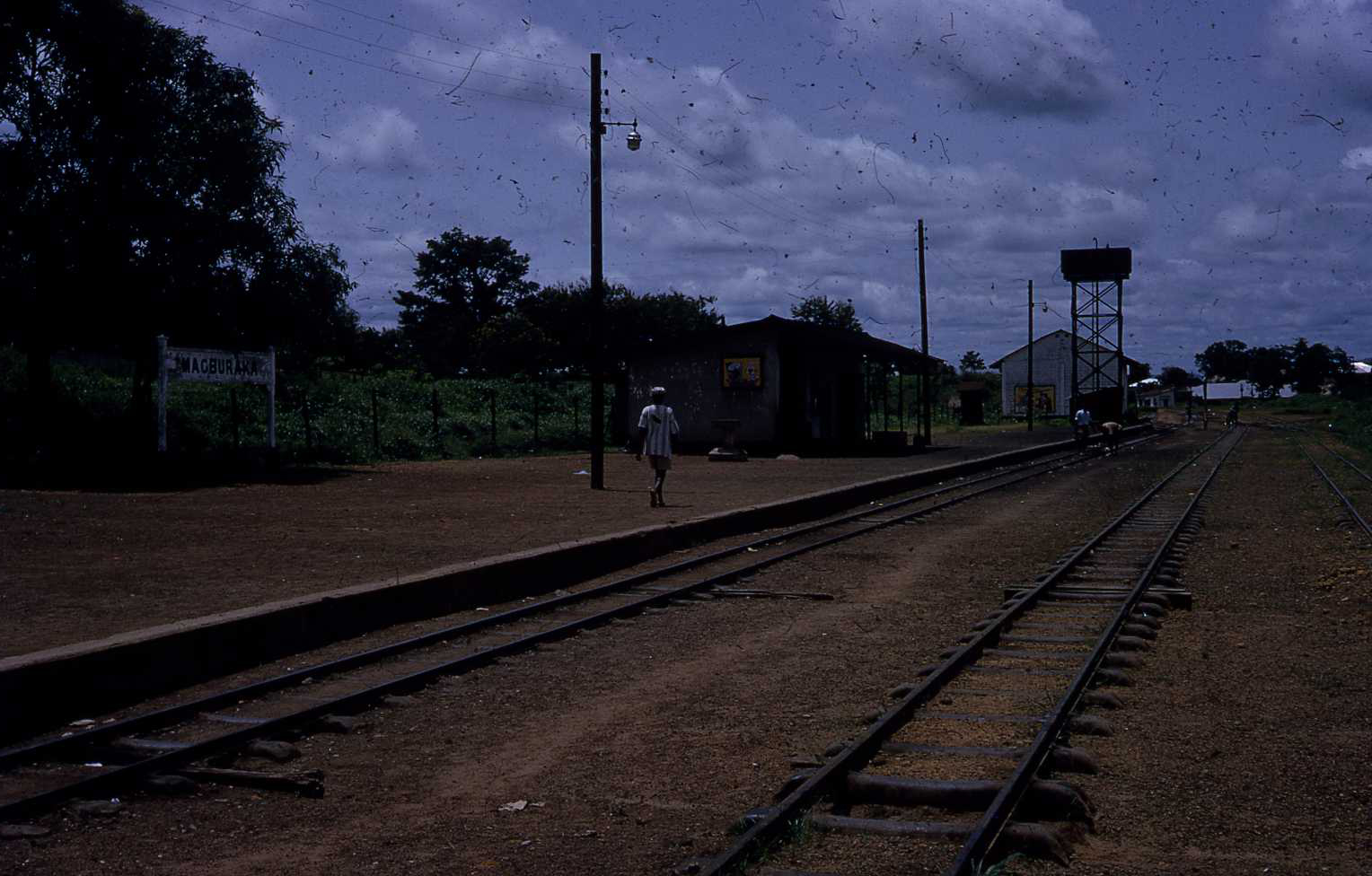
Magburaka station

(government 762 mm (2 ft 6 in) line)

- Freetown in 1896.
- Wellington (7 miles) by March 1897.
- Waterloo April 1898
- Songo (32 miles/51.5 km) 1899
- Bradford - way station
- Rotifunk (56 miles/90.1 km) 1900
- Bauya - junction
- Moyamba
- Mano
- Bo (103 miles/165.8 km) 1903
- Gerihun
- Blama
- Baiima (145m) (220 miles/354 km) 1905
- Pendembu (227.5 miles/366 km) 1907
- Kenema
- Daru - terminus

- Bauya - junction
  - Magburaka - branch
  - Makeni - branch terminus

=== Possible ===
- Bagla Hills - iron ore

== Timeline ==
- September 2008 - dispute over mining leases hampers rehabilitation of Marampa railway.

== Theft ==
While the Port Pepel line is non-operational, much theft of the rail and sleepers is taking place. The only advantage of this is to make conversion to standard gauge more easy.

== See also ==
- Sierra Leone Government Railway
- Transport in Sierra Leone
- Rail transport in Sierra Leone
