= Rail transport in Sierra Leone =

Railway network of Sierra Leone - Tonkolili extension not shown 1067mm gauge tracks (operational) 762 mm gauge tracks (closed in 1974)

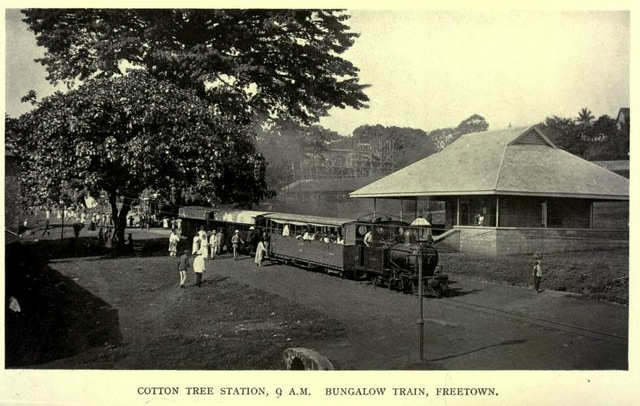
Freetown Cotton Tree station in 1915

There are 192 kilometres of railway in Sierra Leone, all of which is private and of 1067mm gauge.

== Network ==
The existing railway from the port of Pepel has been refurbished and extended by Leone Rock Metal Group to its Tonkolili mine. This 192km line of 1067mm gauge began operation in May 2024 with 10 new AC traction diesel locomotives built by CRRC Ziyang. By 2026, the mining area's monthly transport volume exceeded 1 million tons.

The 762 mm (2 ft 6 in) gauge Sierra Leone Government Railway from Freetown through Bo to Kenema and Daru with a branch to Makeni closed in 1975. The country does not share rail links with adjacent countries, Guinea and Liberia.

== See also ==
- Railway stations in Sierra Leone
- Transport in Sierra Leone
