= Kissy, Sierra Leone =

Kissi
- Location in Sierra Leone
- Coordinates: 8°28′N 13°12′W
- Country: Sierra Leone
- Region: Western Area
- District: Western Area Urban District
- Time zone: UTC-5 (GMT)

Kissy is a neighbourhood located in the East End of the capital, Freetown, in Sierra Leone. It is known for its various health services, including the United Methodist Church Health and Maternity ward, as well as Kissy Mental Hospital. Additionally, Kissy is home to over 500 Liberian refugees. In Kissy Village, you can find the Kissy Road Church of the Holy Trinity, which should not be confused with the Church of the Holy Trinity on Kissy Road. The latter was burned down by RUF rebel forces in 1999, but a restoration plan was implemented, successfully restoring the building. Moreover, the church on Kissy Road operated a school.

== History ==
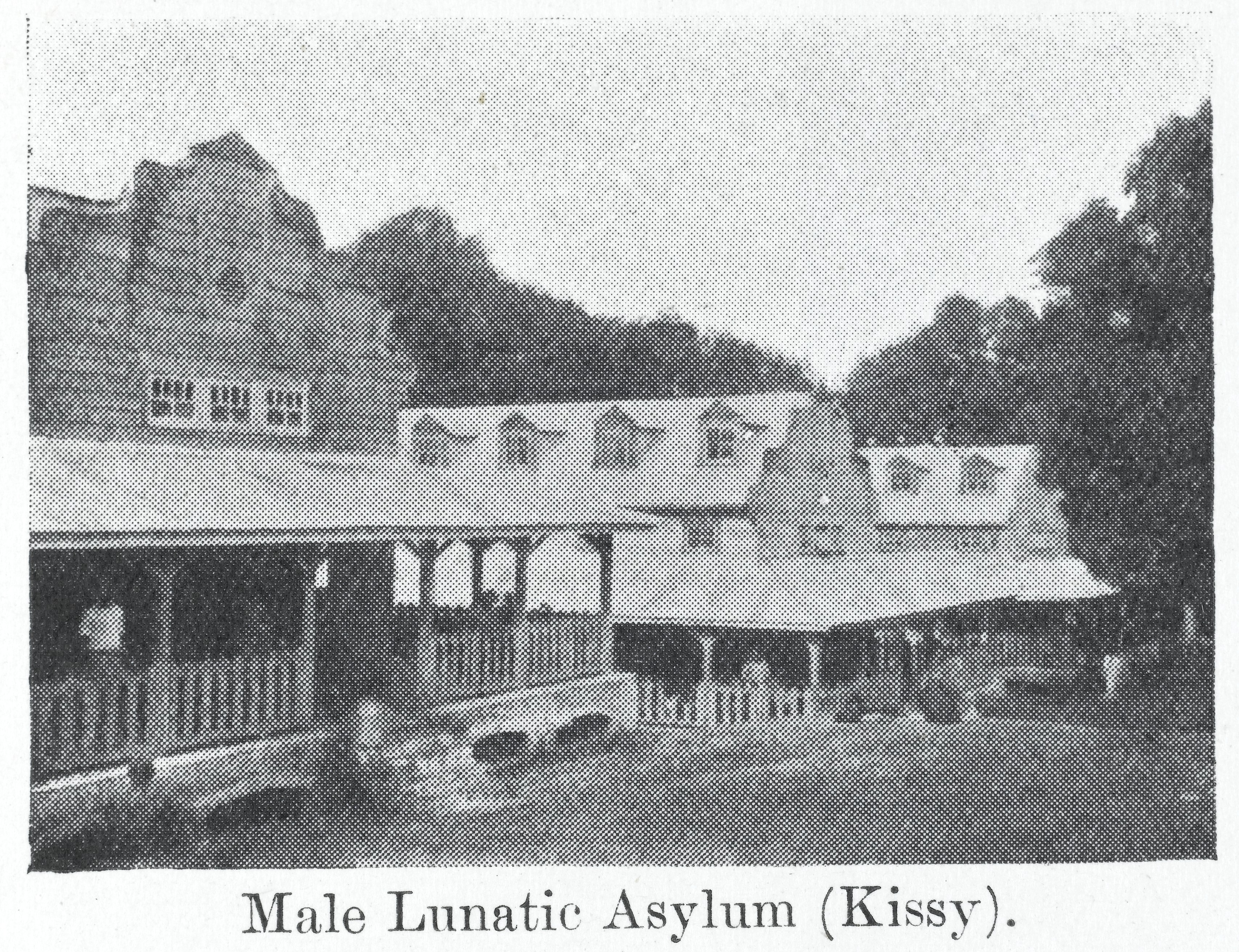
Male Asylum

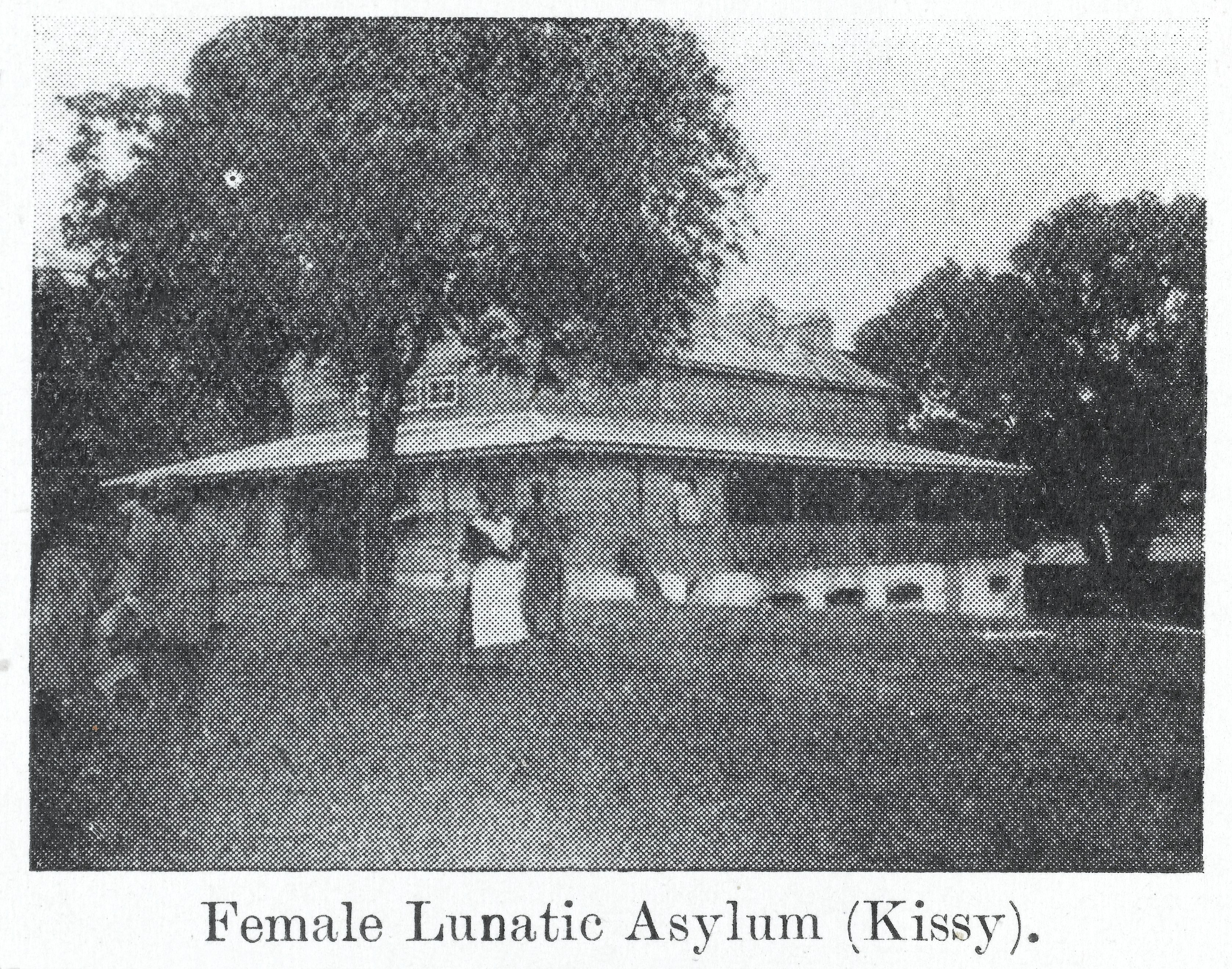
Female Asylum

Kissy was founded in 1816 to provide accommodation for recaptives, liberated enslaved Africans, who had been brought to Freetown by the British Royal Navy West Africa Squadron. The Kissy Lunatic Asylum, the first Lunatic Asylum established in colonial Sub-Saharan Africa, was established here in 1820. It originally catered for both mentally and physically ill people who could not look after themselves. The Asylum was classified as a Colonial hospital in 1844. As the British expanded their colonial holdings, the catchment area of the asylum came to encompass the whole of British West Africa.

== Ferry ==
There is a ferry from Kissy in the south to Tagrin Point at the north of the harbour. At Tagrin Point, taxis are readily available to take passengers to Lungi International Airport.
