= Tonkolele, Sierra Leone =

Town in central Sierra Leone

Coordinates: 08°39′00″N 11°41′00″W

Tonkolele is a town in the Tonkolili District of the Northern Province, in the mountains of central Sierra Leone.

== Resources ==
It is the site of iron ore deposits. Plans to build a railway to Port Pepel, to exploit those deposits, were announced in October 2010.

== See also ==
- Railway stations in Sierra Leone
