= Tagrin Point =

Location of Sierra Leone

Coordinates: 08°32′00″N 13°08′00″W

Tagrin Point is the proposed location of a deep water port to replace the older and shallower port of Port Pepel in Sierra Leone. It would be connected to existing and new iron ore mined by an upgraded railway line converted to standard gauge.

== Ferry ==
Tagrin lies in the Port Loko District of the North West Province, on the opposite or northern side of the harbour to the capital of Freetown.

There is a ferry from Kissy to Tagrin Point.

== See also ==
- Railway stations in Sierra Leone
- Iron ore in Africa
