= Sulima, Sierra Leone =

Sulima
- Location in Sierra Leone
- Coordinates: 6°58′10″N 11°34′30″W
- Country: Sierra Leone
- Province: Southern Province
- Time zone: UTC-5 (GMT)

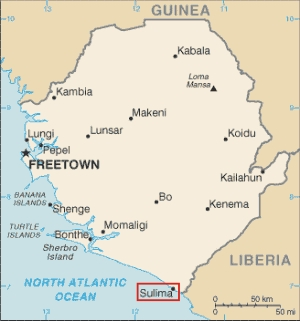
Sulima

Sulima is a town in the extreme south east of Sierra Leone, lying at the mouth of the Moa River. Originally a trading post in the nineteenth century, it has a large population of refugees from Liberia.

== Transport ==
In 2013, Sulima is the proposed site of a new port for the export of iron ore from Tonkolili.

== See also ==
- Railway stations in Sierra Leone
