= Marampa =

- Location in Sierra Leone
- Coordinates: 08°41′0″N 12°28′0″W
- Country: Sierra Leone
- Province: North West Province
- District: Port Loko District
- Elevation: 243 ft (74 m)
- Time zone: UTC-5 (GMT)

Marampa Mines is the site of an hematite iron ore mine based in the town of Lunsar, Port Loko District, Sierra Leone.

== Railway ==
The mine is connected to the port at Port Pepel by an 84 km long 1,067 mm (3 ft 6 in) gauge railway. This railway is experiencing problems with the theft of its track, and other obstructions.

== Mine ==
In September 2008, the mine at Marampa was sold to Cape Lambert Iron Ore.

In 2012 Cape Lambert Resources decided to sell the mine. In 2013 Cape Lambert requested a mining license for the mine. At the moment (August 2014) the mine is still available for sale.

== See also ==
- Transport in Sierra Leone
- Railway stations in Sierra Leone
