= Sierra Leone National Railway Museum =

Coordinates: 8°29′22″N 13°12′21″W

National Railway Museum
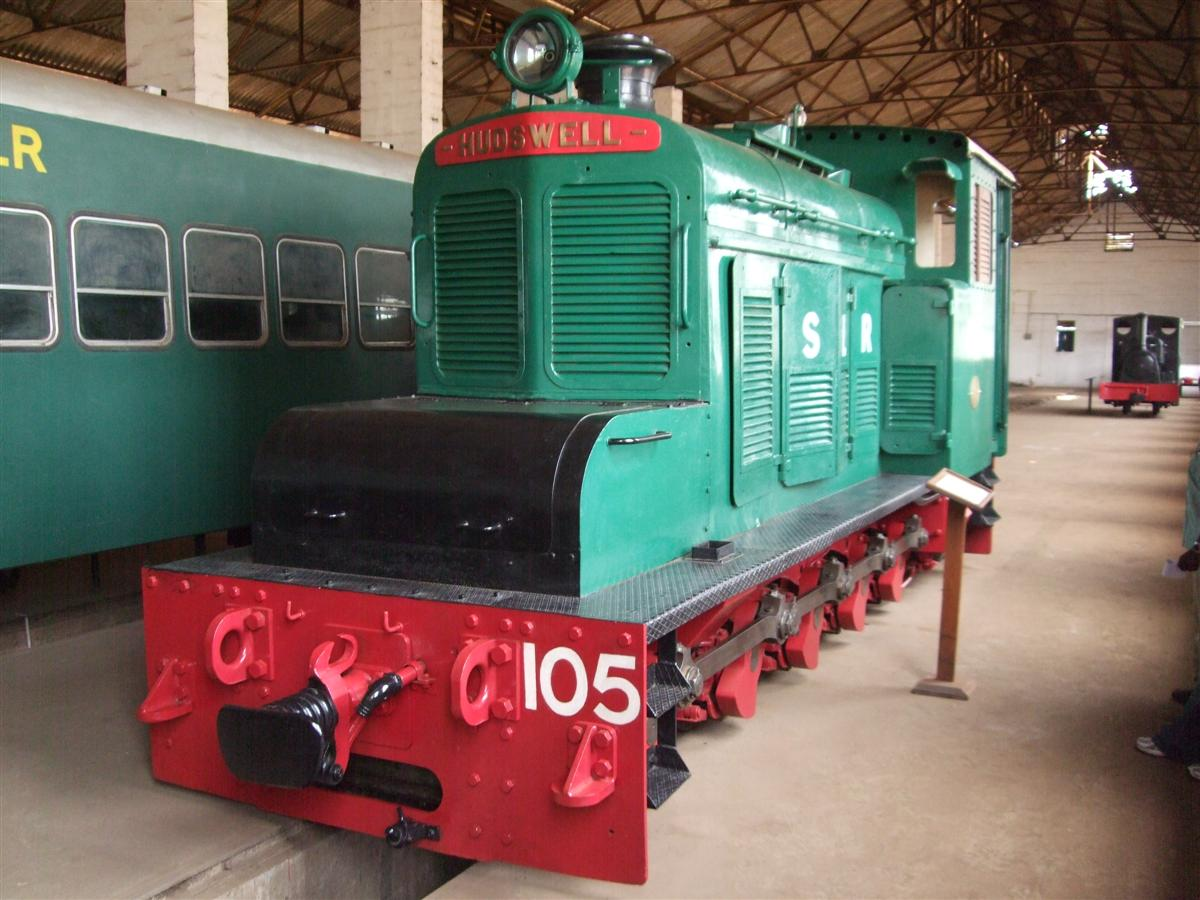
- Established: 2005
- Location: Cline Town, Freetown, Sierra Leone
- Type: Rail museum
- Website: National Railway Museum

The National Railway Museum is a railway museum in Freetown, Sierra Leone. The museum was opened in 2005.

== History ==
The Sierra Leone Government Railway closed in 1974. A collection of rolling stock was retained at the former railway workshops to form a museum. Locos included one of the 4-8-2+2-8-4 Garratts, a Hunslet tank, and a couple of the diesel locos. Several coaches were also kept, including the Governor's coach, and a coach specially prepared for the visit of Queen Elizabeth II in 1961.

Through the years of civil strife and war this collection disappeared from sight and it was feared it had been destroyed. However the collection survived despite the workshops being used as a centre for displaced persons. Following the initiative of a British army officer, Colonel Steve Davies, restoration of the equipment commenced in 2004.

The former President of the Republic of Sierra Leone, Alhaji Dr. Ahmad Tejan Kabbah, visited the workshops site and indicated his support for preserving the railway heritage of Sierra Leone and opening the museum. The Sierra Leone National Railway Museum opened in Cline Town in 2005.

== The museum ==
The museum is open 10am-4pm Monday to Saturday. The museum is supported by Friends of the Sierra Leone National Railway Museum, based in the UK. In addition to the various preserved locomotives and carriages, there are numerous displays of old photographs, tickets, maps and time tables. Entry to the museum is 150 SLE (Jan 2025), however, visitors are encouraged to make a donation towards its upkeep.
