= Pepel =

- Location in Sierra Leone
- Coordinates: 8°35′N 13°04′W
- Country: Sierra Leone
- province: North West Province
- District: Port Loko District
- Elevation: 3.3 ft (1 m)
- Time zone: UTC-5 (GMT)

Pepel is a coastal town in the Port Loko District in the North West Province of Sierra Leone.

== Port ==
Pepel has a port in the Sierra Leone River used for shipping bulk iron ore via the mining company African Minerals.

== Railway ==
Pepel is connected by a 1,067 mm (3 ft 6 in) gauge 84 km long railway to an iron ore mine at Marampa.

It is proposed to introduce a more efficient balloon loop at the port.

An extension of this line to a deeper port at Tagrin Point is also proposed.

== See also ==
- Railway stations in Sierra Leone
- Transport in Sierra Leone
