= Transport in Sierra Leone =

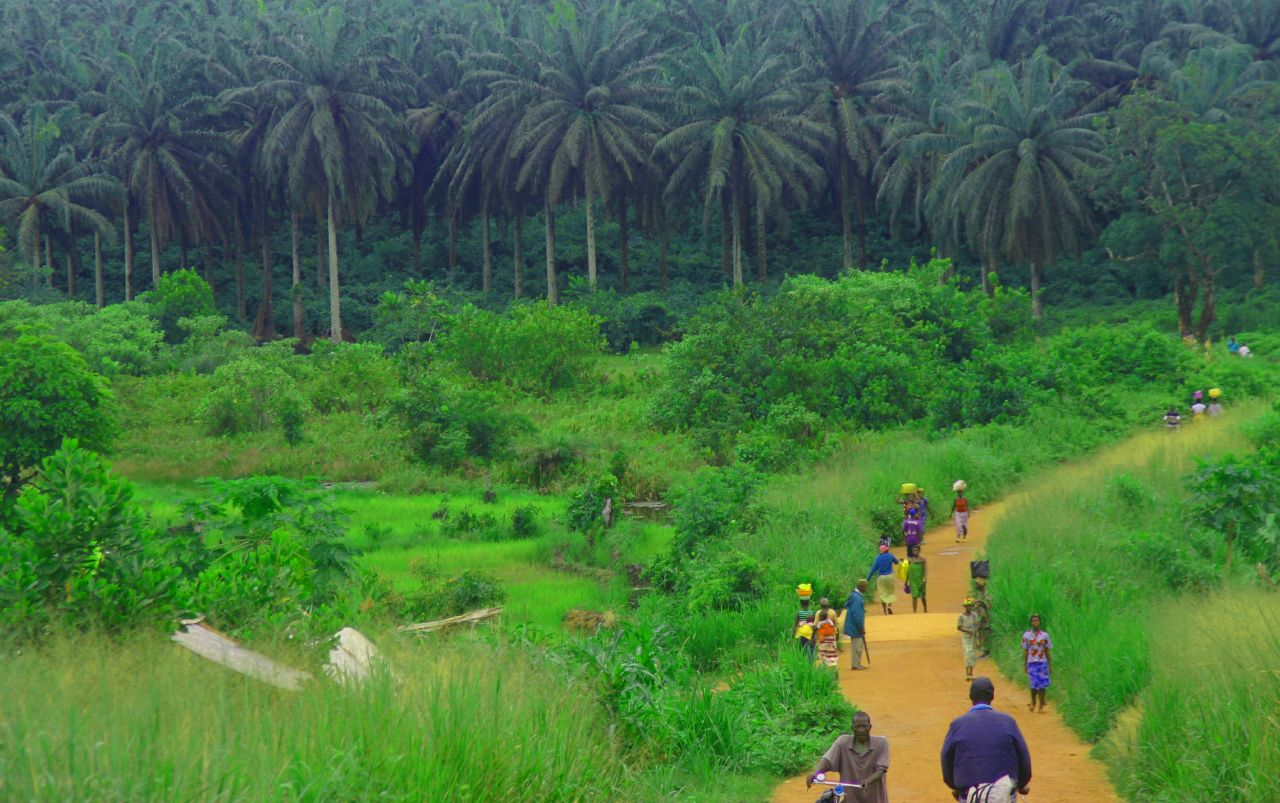
The road from Kenema to Kailahun District.

There are a number of systems of transport in Sierra Leone, a country in West Africa, which possess road, rail, air and water infrastructure, including a network of highways and several airports.

Just like Great Britain, Sierra Leone used to drive on the left hand side of the road. In March 1971, Sierra Leone had a change-over and started to drive on the right hand side of the road. By law, it is forbidden to import and register cars with the steering wheel on the right hand side in Sierra Leone, but in 2012 the government was failing at enforcing this law.

== Railways ==
Railway network of Sierra Leone 1,067 mm (3 ft 6 in) gauge - purple 762 mm (2 ft 6 in) gauge - pink - closed.

There are 192 kilometres (119 mi) of railway in Sierra Leone, of which all is of a narrow 1,067 mm gauge.

Sierra Leone no longer has any common carrier railroads, as the 762 mm gauge Sierra Leone Government Railway from Freetown through Bo to Kenema and Daru with a branch to Makeni closed in 1974. The country does not share rail links with adjacent countries, Guinea and Liberia.

The existing route was operated from 1933 until 1975 by the Sierra Leone Development Company's iron ore mines at Marampa, 66 km (41 mi) east-northeast of the port at Pepel. It is now 192km in length and operated by Leone Rock Metal Group to serve its Tonkolili iron ore mine.

== Walking ==
Because of widespread poverty, high petroleum prices and a large portion of the population residing in small communities, walking is often the preferred method of transport in Sierra Leone.

== Highways ==
There are 11,700 kilometres (7,270 mi) of highway in Sierra Leone, of which 936 km (582 mi) are paved. When construction and reconstruction of roads and bridges in the country is complete, the Trans–West African Coastal Highway will cross Sierra Leone, connecting it to Conakry (Guinea), Monrovia (Liberia), and 11 other nations of the Economic Community of West African States (ECOWAS).

== Water ==
There are 800 km (497 mi) of waterways in Sierra Leone, of which 600 km (373 mi) are navigable year-round.

Major ports of Sierra Leone include: Bonthe, Freetown and Pepel. Queen Elizabeth II Quay in Freetown represents the country's only deep water port facility capable of berthing large-hulled cargo or military vessels. The country possesses a merchant marine of two cargo ships exceeding 1,000 GT.

== Airports ==
There are ten airports in Sierra Leone, of which one has paved runways (the length of which exceeds 3,047 m or 9,997 ft). Of the remaining airports, all of which having unpaved runways, seven have runways of lengths between 914 and 1,523 m (2,999 and 4,997 ft); the remaining two having runways of shorter length. There are two heliports in the country.
