= Bagla Hills =

Contested iron-rich area within Sierra Leone

Coordinates: 07°15′52″N 11°18′17″W

The Bagla Hills are located in eastern Sierra Leone within Gola Rainforest National Park, created in 2010, near the border with Liberia. The site has been the subject of controversy between developers and conservationists, as it contains a large iron ore deposit. The Bagla Hills are one of the habitats of the endangered Jentink's duiker.

The deposit was first discovered in the 1970s by the now defunct American company Bethlehem Steel. Their preliminary evaluation produced "an ore reserve estimate of 384 million tons of primary ore (magnetite) at 18.1% Fe [iron] and about 90 million tons of haematite ore at 34.3% iron."

In 2005, SL Minerals was awarded the exclusive prospecting license for iron ore in the Bagla Hills area. However, in May 2009, Global Witness reported it had been told by the Director of Geological Surveys that SL Minerals had defaulted on a payment and gone into liquidation.

Around 2009, President of Sierra Leone Ernest Bai Koroma went to London, seeking investors to help his nation recover from the Sierra Leone Civil War (1991-2002). Steve Cosser, an Australian pay-TV tycoon, proved receptive and came up with plans to mine the ore, while at the same time developing social programmes to benefit the people living there. In 2010, Cosser purportedly obtained a 72-year lease from the 23 families living on the land. Sable Mining Africa Limited claimed to have obtained a 50-year lease in a 7 April 2011 press release, but the government of Sierra Leone stated a week later that "all Mineral Resources within the confines of Bagla Hills is (sic) not for prospecting, exploration or mining, as they fall within a reserved area" and that it would begin an investigation of both Sable Mining and Cosser's Red Rock Mining (SL) Limited regarding the alleged lease acquisitions. In 2012, the government made "a commitment to not allow any form of mining inside the National Park." In October 2016, The Standard Press reported that the High Court had ruled that two leases awarded to Cosser dated 20 December 2010 and 2 February 2011 were forgeries and awarded 50 million Sierra Leonean leones in costs to the plaintiffs.

The Bagla Hills have a maximum height of 330 metres (1,080 ft).

== See also ==
- Iron ore in Africa
