= Sierra Leone Government Railway =

Former railway service

This article is part of the history of rail transport by country series

Railway network of Sierra Leone

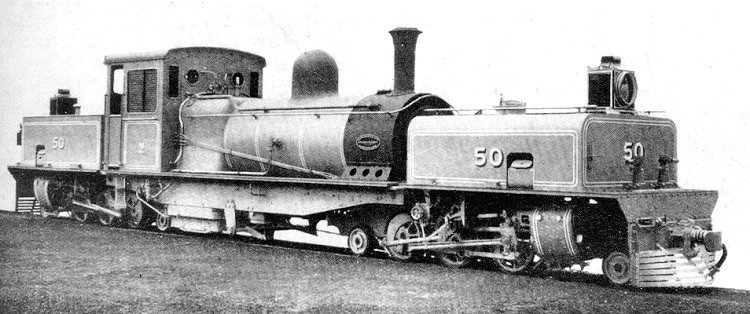
Beyer, Peacock & Company works photo of SLGR Garratt locomotive no. 50, taken in 1926

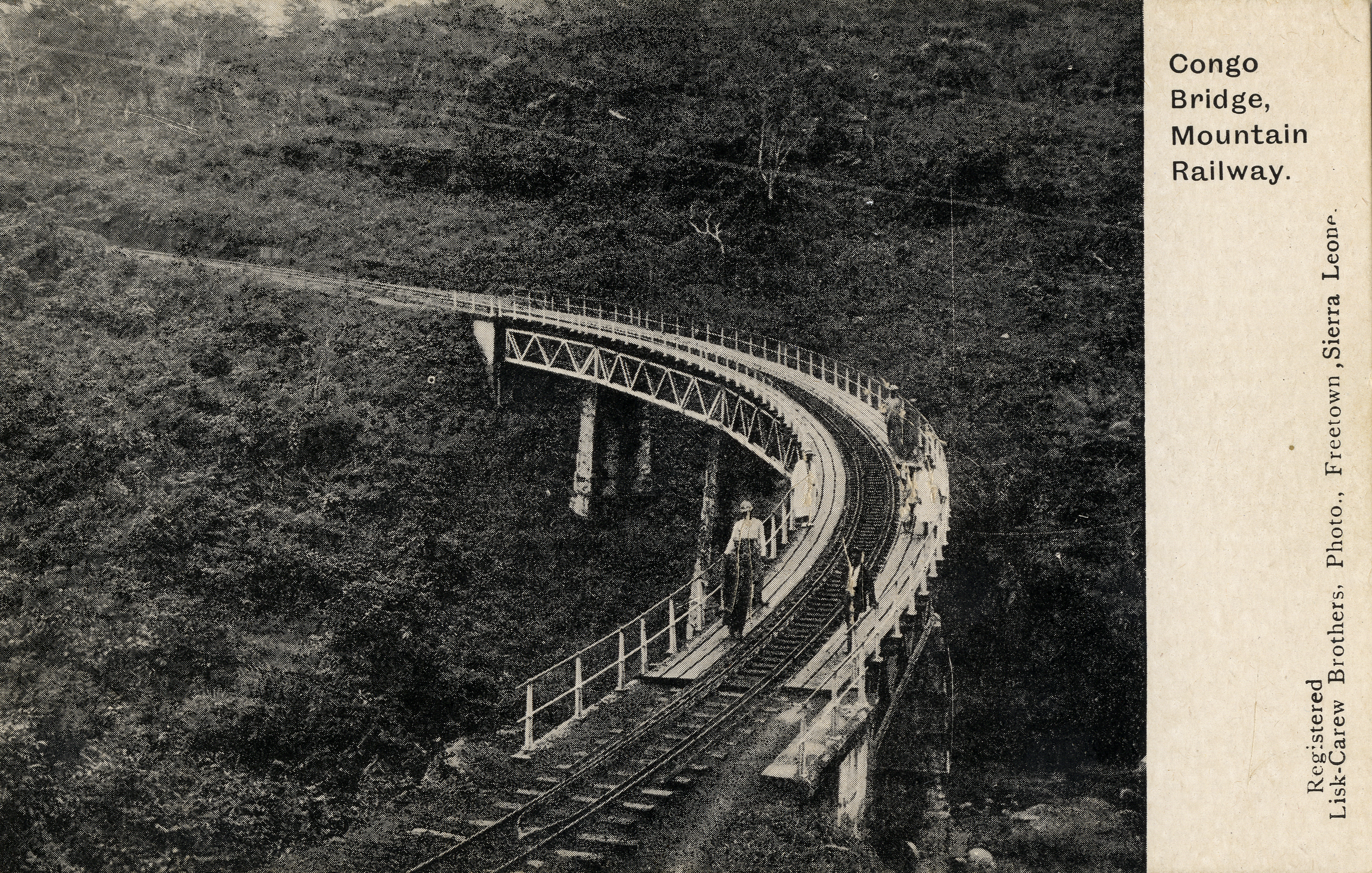
Lisk-Carew Brothers: Congo (Town) Bridge, Mountain Railway, Sierra Leone, 1910s.

The Sierra Leone Government Railway operated in Sierra Leone from 1897 to 1974. It was unusual in that it formed a national railway system constructed solely to a 2 ft 6 in (762 mm) narrow gauge, whereas in other countries, gauge of such a narrow width was usually confined to feeder railways.The Sierra Leone railway tracks terminated at Pendembu and not Daru.

== History ==
=== Beginnings ===
A number of early proposals for a railway in the British colony of Sierra Leone date from 1872, including a proposal for a trans-Sahara railway, all of which came to naught. Finally in 1893, a proposal financed by the Liverpool Chamber of Commerce was adopted, and surveying commenced. Survey parties confronted many difficulties, especially disease, which delayed completion of the survey.

=== Opening ===
Construction commenced from Freetown in 1896, and the first section of railway was opened to Wellington (7 miles) by March 1897. Subsequent openings were:

- Waterloo, April 1898
- Songo (32 miles/51.5 km) 1899
- Rotifunk (56 miles/90.1 km) 1900
- Bo (103 miles/165.8 km) 1903
- Baiima (220 miles/354 km) 1905
- Pendembu (227.5 miles/366 km) 1907

=== Branches ===
Other lines were also constructed. A short branch of 5.5 miles (8.9 km) length was built in 1903 from Freetown to Hill Station, at 748 feet (228 m) above sea level. Acting Resident Engineer (August 1903) was James William Turner. The line allowed Europeans to live in the healthier hills area above Freetown, but with competition from motor cars, it was closed in 1929.

A more substantial branch was built from Bauya Junction to Makeni (84 miles/135.2 km) in 1914. It was later extended to Kambai (104 miles/167.4 km), but subsequently cut back to Makeni in 1930. At this time, total route length was 311 miles (501 km).

=== 1926 strike ===
In 1926, workers on the railway went on strike, protesting against discriminatory requirements applied to black clerks seeking pay raises. The strike lasted six weeks, but was a failure despite support from the black elite, with the strikers forced to take lowered pay and extra hours as punishment.

=== World War II ===
The railways assumed increased importance in World War II. Apart from moving mineral resources from the interior to the coast, the railway was also important in supporting fighting in North Africa. Fighter aircraft were shipped to the end of the line, where they were assembled and flown on to Egypt.

=== Renewal ===
The equipment of the railway was renewed in the 1950s with the introduction of diesel locomotives and the purchase of some 155 new freight wagons. Both freight and passenger traffic increased during this decade. Independence came to Sierra Leone in 1961, and as an independence gift, the United Kingdom gave 45 new passenger coaches.

=== Closure ===
Increased road traffic and changes in government policy in the 1960s led to a decline in traffic, and various proposals for its future. They included a new branch to serve a bauxite mine, and conversion to a wider gauge. A report of the United Nations Special Fund, though, which recommended closure, was adopted. The Makeni branch was closed in 1968, followed by the Kenema-Pendembu section in 1971. Further closures as far as Bo occurred in 1973, and the railway finally closed completely in 1974.

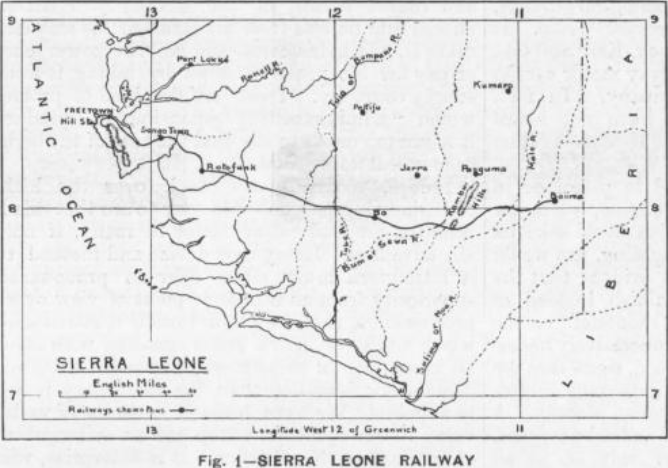
Map of the Sierra Leone Railway

== Locomotives ==
=== Steam ===
The first locomotives supplied to the railway were two 0-6-0T built by the Hunslet Engine Company and supplied in 1897. These were quickly followed by a 2-6-2T design from Hunslet, which proved very successful and enduring; a large number were built between 1898 and 1920. Further locomotives of this design continued to be supplied throughout the steam era, the last two being built in 1954. Elements of this design were used in the construction of a locomotive for the Welsh Highland Railway known as Russell.

Five 2-8-2T from Hunslet were supplied in 1906, to be followed by two 4-8-0 tender v from Nasmyth, Wilson and Company in 1910. Further 4-8-0 locomotives were built by North British Locomotive Company and Hawthorn Leslie & Company, bringing the total to 17 by 1921. The 1926 introduction of 2-6-2+2-6-2 Garratts from Beyer, Peacock & Company, eliminated double heading of a 2-6-2T with a 4-8-0. The 2-8-2T had proved unsuitable, and all were withdrawn by the mid-1920s.

World War II placed great demands on the railway, and its importance was demonstrated by the railway being supplied with a number of new locomotives. Six new Garratts were supplied in 1942, and 20 4-8-0s were built by WG Bagnall and Andrew Barclay Sons & Co. Additionally, six 2-8-0 locomotives that had been built in Switzerland were brought in from the South India Railways. To further increase capacity, five of the earlier 2-6-2+2-6-2 Garratts were converted to a 2-8-0+0-8-2 wheel arrangement so as to increase adhesion. Experience with these modified Garratts influenced the final steam class purchased by the railway. In 1956, 14 modern 4-8-2+2-8-4 Garratts were purchased from Beyer, Peacock & Company. These locomotives increased the maximum load over 1:50 grades from 200 tons (203 tonnes) to 270 tons (274 tonnes).

=== Diesel ===
In the meantime, the railway had turned to diesel traction. The first were purchased in 1954, being three 145 HP, 20 ton 0-8-0s built by Hudswell Clarke primarily for shunting duties, followed by five more in 1960. A class of larger diesels was supplied by the same maker between 1958 and 1961. The class consisted of 24 225 HP 29 ton 2-8-2s for mainline use. These locomotives were a limited success, speeding up operations and reducing costs, but were not without their problems. Batteries supplied on them were not large enough to start the engines, and a van with additional batteries had to accompany them as a tender. Overall, the railway had difficulties in maintaining the diesel locomotives, and steam locomotives continued to operate. At closure, the railway possessed five operating steam and four diesel locomotives.

== Engineering ==
The railway was built with 30 lb rail, limiting axle load to 5 tons. Some of the extensions were built as "tramways", with rail weight reduced to 20 and even 15 lb. To increase axle loadings and the speed limit above 20 mph (32.2 km/h), some sections of the line were rebuilt with 40 lb rail in the 1950s.

Most of the line was built with a 1 to 50 (2%) gradient, but some sections were as steep as 1 to 39 (2.6%). The Hill Station line had a gradient of 1 to 22 (4.5%). Some 139 bridges had a span over 20 feet (6.1 m) on the line, the longest being of six spans and 716 feet (218.24 m) across.

== Preservation ==
=== In Wales ===
Following the railway’s closure, in 1975, the last of the 2-6-2T Hunslet locomotives to be built for the railway, No. 85, and four of the carriages built by the Gloucester Railway Carriage & Wagon Company, in 1961, were purchased by the Welshpool & Llanfair Light Railway (W&LLR) and shipped to Wales, arriving in August that year. After overhauls, two of the carriages entered service on the W&LLR in 1977 followed by the locomotive in 1978.

After a further overhaul, the locomotive commenced a new tour of duty in 1992. Significant firebox repairs were carried out in 2000, and then it ran again until 2010, when it was withdrawn, being in need of a new boiler. In 2011, the locomotive went on display at the National Railway Museum, Shildon, before return to Llanfair Caereinion by way of a nationwide tour in 2017.

With the W&LLR preferring to operate balcony-ended carriages, the Sierra Leone vehicles fell out of favour in the late 1990s; however, two of them were refurbished in 2007-2008 and have since appeared on occasional special workings.

=== In Sierra Leone ===
In Sierra Leone, a collection of rolling stock was retained at the former railway workshops to form a museum. Locomotives included one of the 4-8-2+2-8-4 Garratts, a Hunslet tank, and two of the diesel locomotives. Several coaches were also kept, including the Governor's coach, and a coach specially prepared for the visit of Queen Elizabeth II in 1961. Through the years of civil strife and war, this collection disappeared from sight and it was feared it had been destroyed, but the collection survived despite the workshops being used as a centre for displaced persons. Following the initiative of a British Army officer, Colonel Steve Davies, restoration of the equipment commenced in 2004. The former president of the Republic of Sierra Leone, Alhaji Dr. Ahmad Tejan Kabbah, visited the workshops site and indicated his support for restoring the museum and preserving the railway heritage of Sierra Leone. The Sierra Leone National Railway Museum is open in Cline Town, Freetown. As of 2016, the museum has seen ongoing improvements by a dedicated team of supporters, which includes Colonel Davies.

== See also ==
- Rail transport in Sierra Leone
- Transport in Sierra Leone
