= Cotton Tree (Sierra Leone) =

Tree in Freetown, Sierra Leone

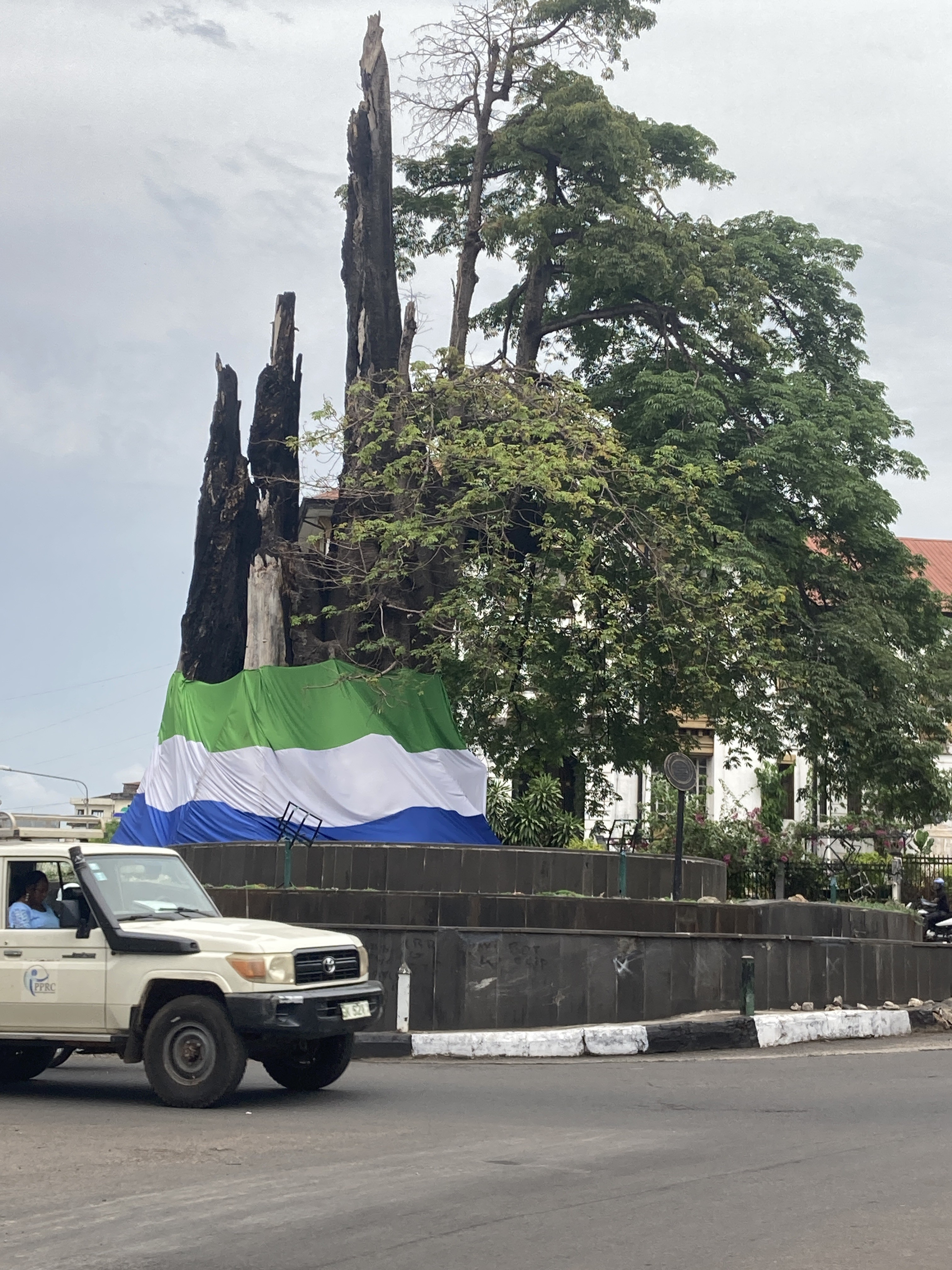
- Cotton Tree (2025)
- Interactive map of Cotton Tree
- Species: Kapok (Ceiba pentandra)
- Location: Freetown, Sierra Leone
- Coordinates: 8.4872°N 13.2356°W
- Height: 40 metres (130 ft)
- Girth: 15 metres (49 ft)
- Date seeded: c. 17th century

The Cotton Tree is a kapok tree (Ceiba pentandra) that is a historic symbol of Freetown, the capital city of Sierra Leone. The Cotton Tree gained importance in 1792 when a group of formerly enslaved African Americans, who had gained their freedom by fighting for the British during the American Revolutionary War, settled the site of modern Freetown. These former Black Loyalist soldiers, also known as Black Nova Scotians (because they were evacuated to Nova Scotia before leaving North America), resettled in Sierra Leone and founded Freetown on 11 March 1792. The descendants of the Nova Scotian settlers form part of the Sierra Leone Creole ethnicity today.

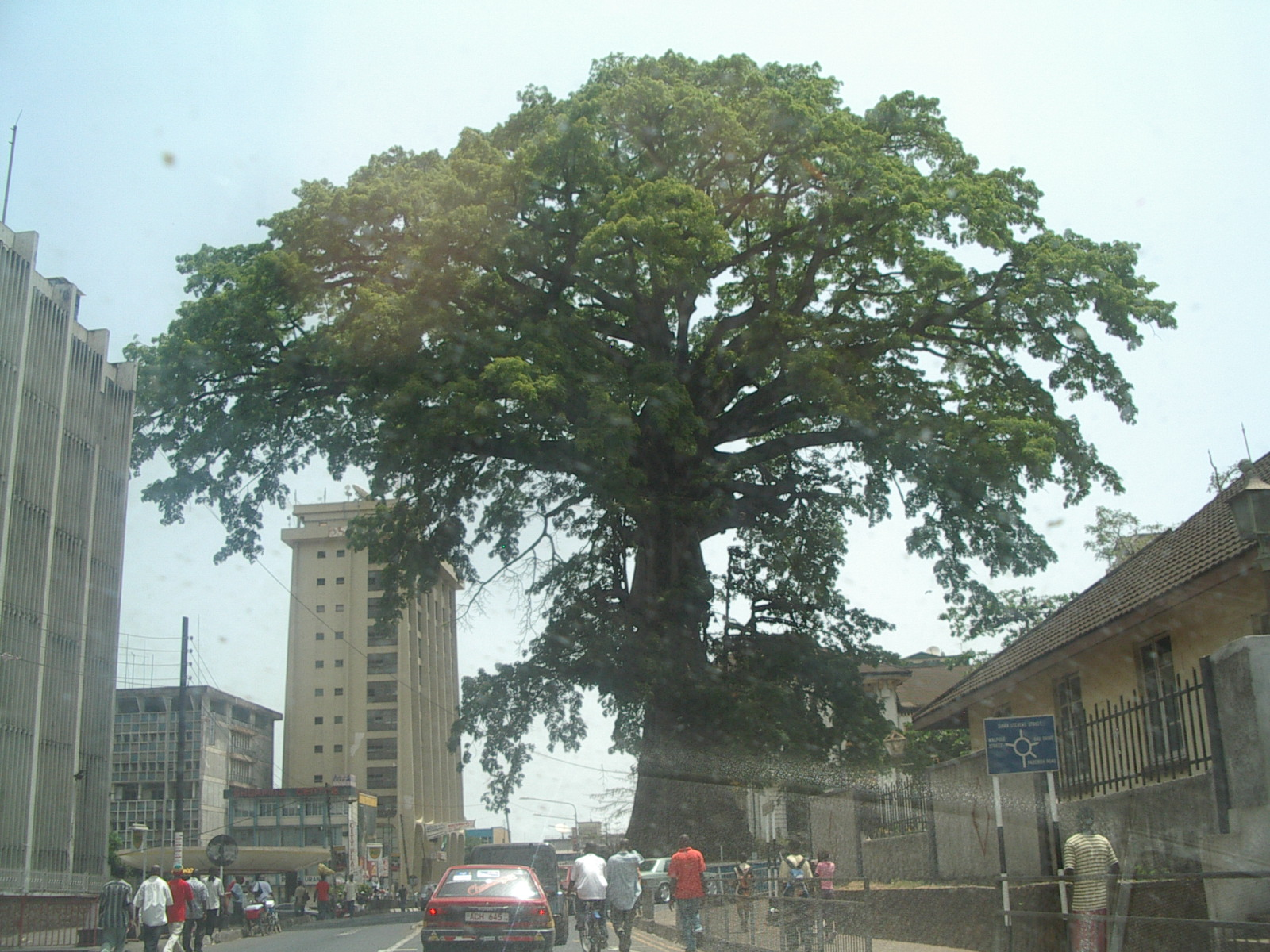
Street-level view of Cotton Tree at the centre of Freetown in April 2007

On the night of May 24, 2023, much of Freetown's Cotton Tree toppled over as heavy rain hit the city.

== History ==
The exact age of the Cotton Tree is unknown, but it is thought to have been about 400 years old. It was mature prior to the foundation of Freetown and there are records of its existence in 1787 when settlers from Britain came to the peninsula. In March 1792, a group of former slaves who joined the settlement are said to have gathered under the Cotton Tree to pray and a white preacher named Nathaniel Gilbert preached a sermon. The Cotton Tree was also an important landmark for the Temne people who marked territory based on whether it was visible from the tree.

There are many legends concerning the Cotton Tree. Stories relate that the tree was planted by freed slaves from a seed taken from the Caribbean or that a slave market was held in the tree's shade. Another legend related that catastrophe would come if the tree ever fell.

The 40-metre-tall (130 ft), 15-metre-girth (49 ft) Cotton Tree was the oldest of its kind in Freetown and one of Sierra Leone's most famous landmarks. It stood in a roundabout near the Supreme Court building, the music club building, and the Sierra Leone National Museum, which was established in the former Cotton Tree Telephone Exchange and had "Cotton Tree, Freetown" as its postal address. A booklet of Sierra Leonean heritage sites described the tree as standing,

like a colossus, in the middle of the city keeping watch, and 'protecting', the capital, as it has done for over two hundred years. Its gnarled and spiky trunks, sturdy bole and massive shady branches also give it the look of a sentinel, "standing in the centre of the oldest part of Freetown, surrounded by, yet dominating the principal buildings of Church, Law, and Government."

A 1933 Sierra Leonean two pence stamp, designed by a Roman Catholic missionary and issued as part of a set commemorating abolitionist William Wilberforce, portrayed the Cotton Tree along with text reading "Old Slave Market". After Sierra Leone gained independence in 1961, the tree was visited by Queen Elizabeth II. The Cotton Tree has been celebrated in children's nursery rhymes and was featured in Sierra Leone's first banknotes in 1964. Sierra Leonean poet Oumar Farouk Sesay composed a poem about the tree, comparing it to major world landmarks such as the Eiffel Tower and Big Ben.

The British ethnographer and colonial administrator E. F. Sayers wrote of the Cotton Tree in 1947:

How many human joys and human sorrows has our Freetown Cotton Tree not seen, and how many tragedies and comedies must have been enacted within the sight of it and within its sight? ... Freetown's Cotton Tree stands today for a sense of continuity in our corporate life, a symbolic link between our past and our future.

The trunk of the Cotton Tree was reinforced with steel straps and concrete. Thousands of fruit bats roosted on the tree's branches. At some point, it was partially scorched from a lightning strike. It also caught fire in 2018 and again in January 2020. In 2019, the Freetown City Council authorized rental allowances for the relocation of 62 people who had been begging and living around the Cotton Tree.

On the night of May 24, 2023, much of Freetown's Cotton Tree toppled over as heavy rain hit the city. Part of the tree's trunk and a large leafy gall, however, remained alive at the site, with a report from March 2024 attesting to the health of the remaining part of the tree. On the day of the tragedy, President Julius Maada Bio mourned the loss, saying there was "no stronger symbol of our national story than the Cotton Tree, a physical embodiment of where we come from as a country". He promised to include diverse voices in the creation of a new monument, including the remains of the fallen part of the tree, which, on his orders, were taken to a museum.

== See also ==
- List of individual trees
