= Freetown =

Capital and largest city of Sierra Leone

Freetown Fritɔun
- Capital city and municipality
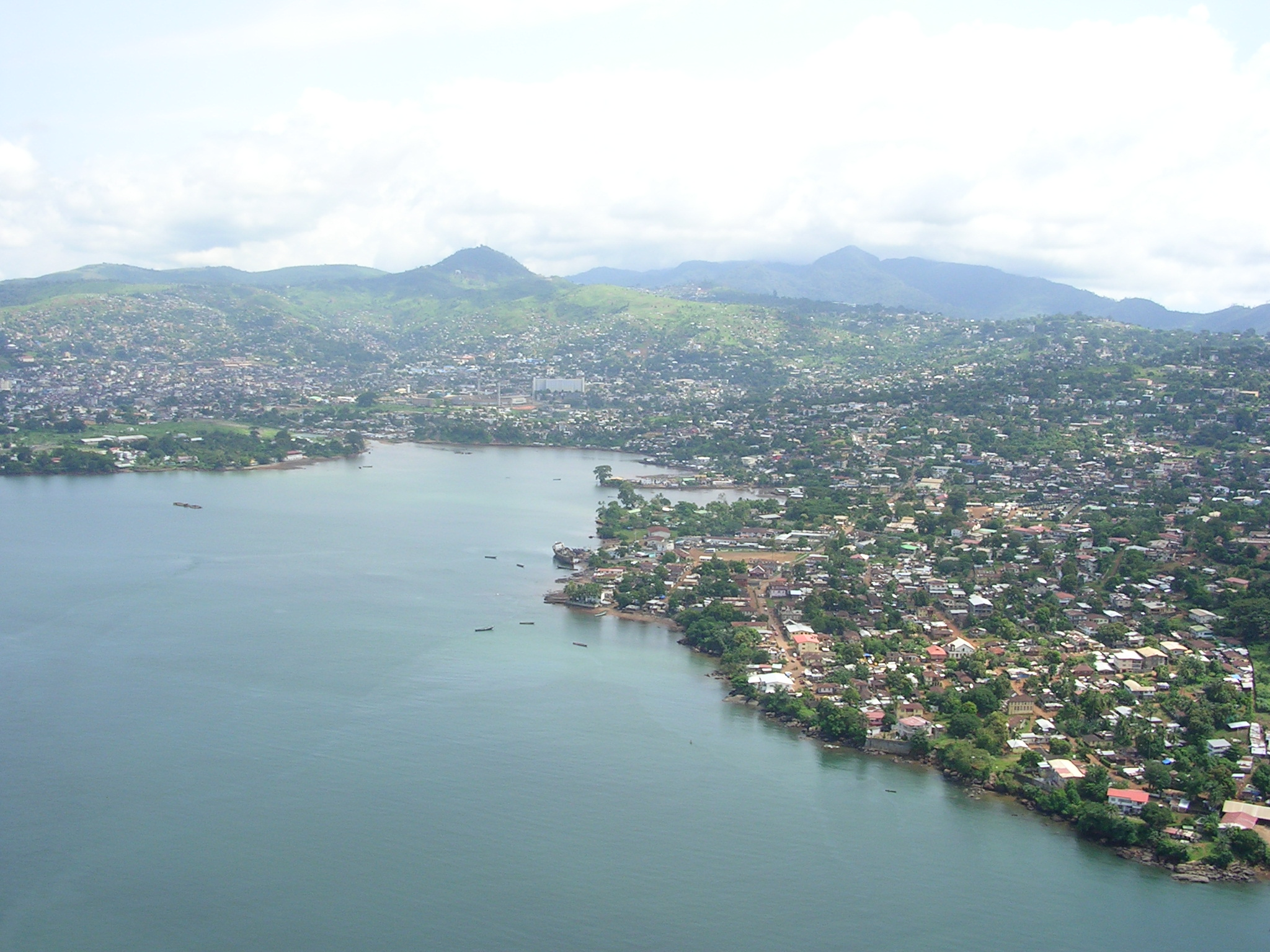
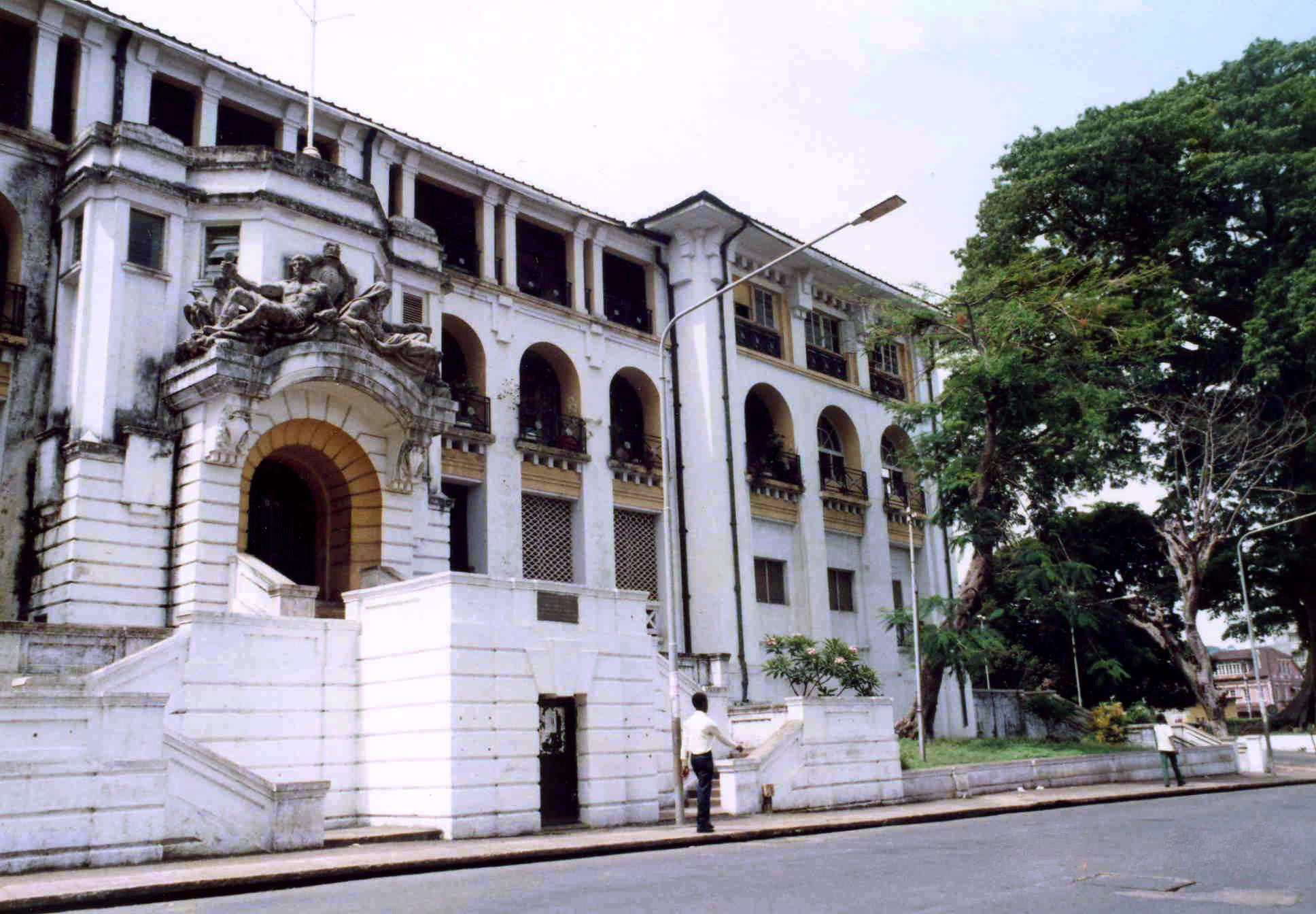
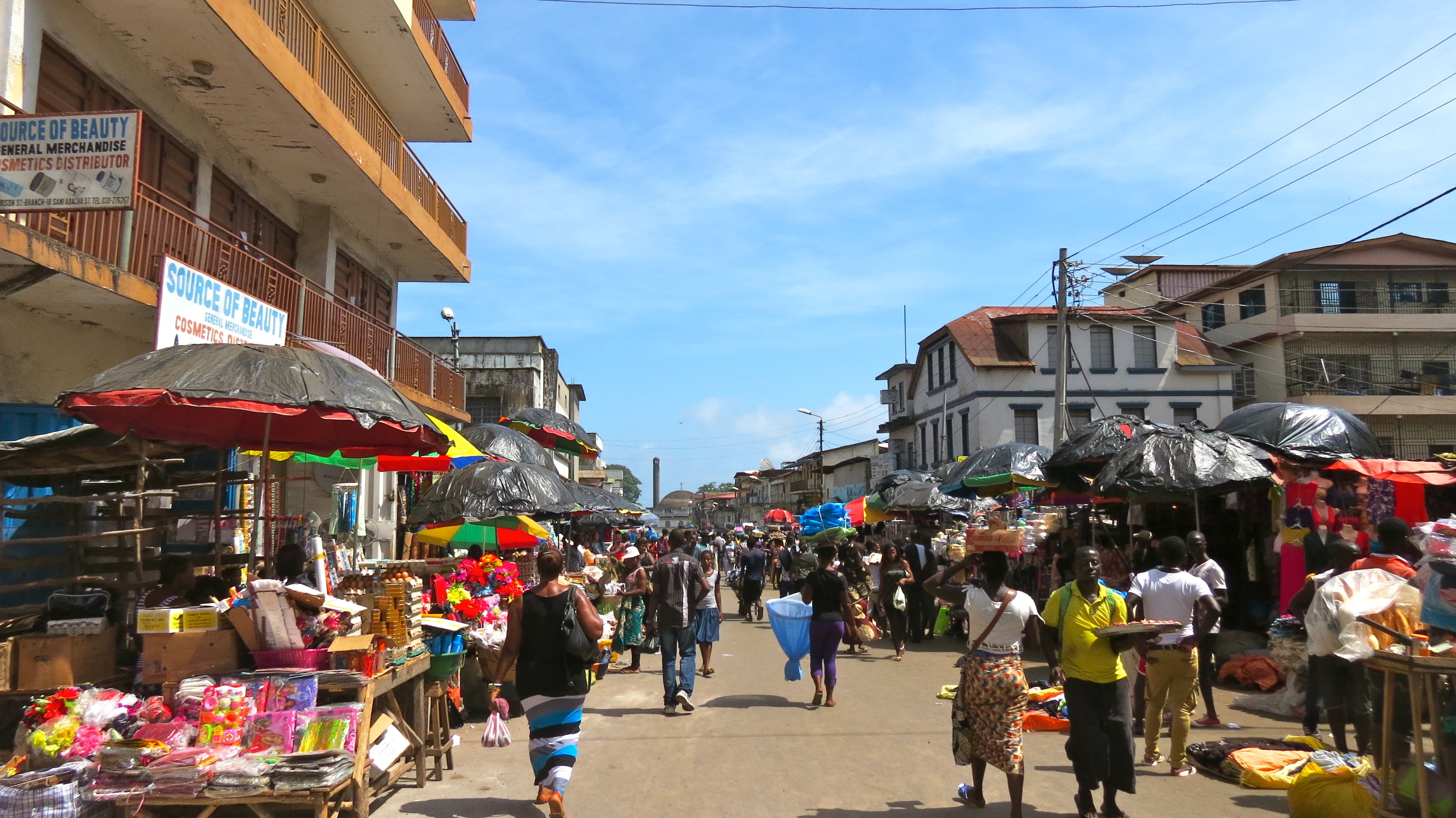
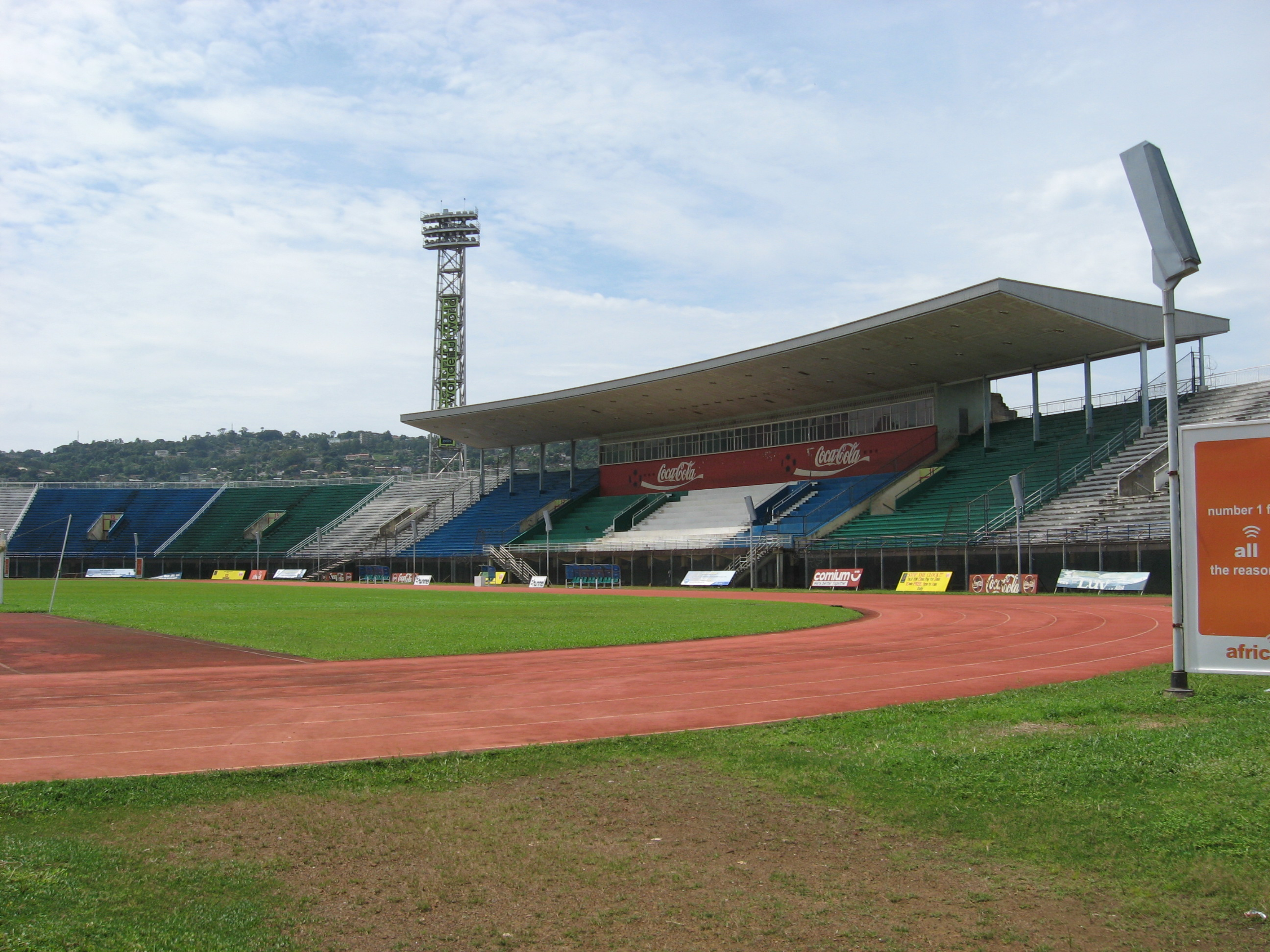
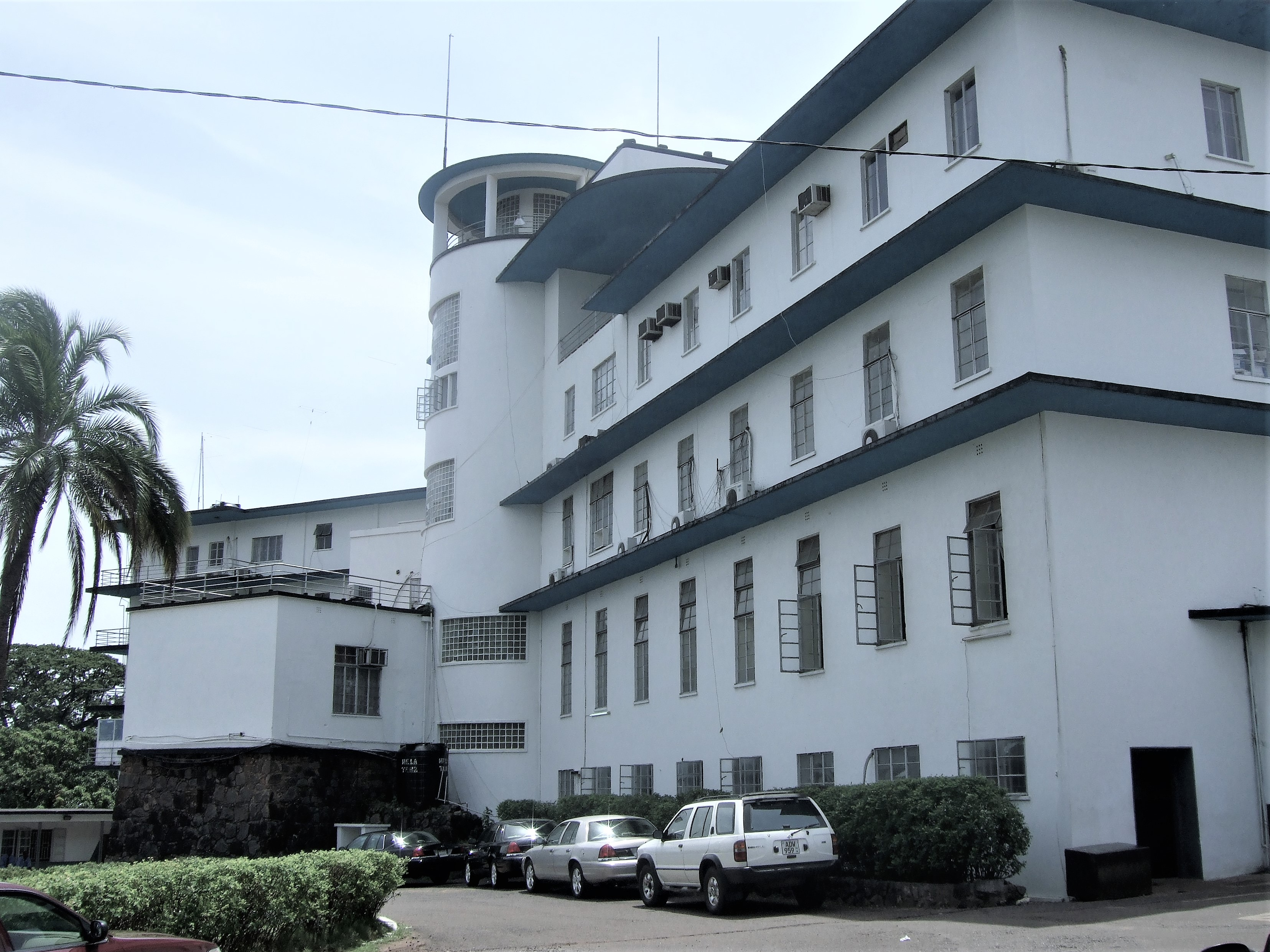
- Aerial view Freetown Court and Cotton Tree Downtown Freetown Sierra Leone National Stadium Sierra Leone State House

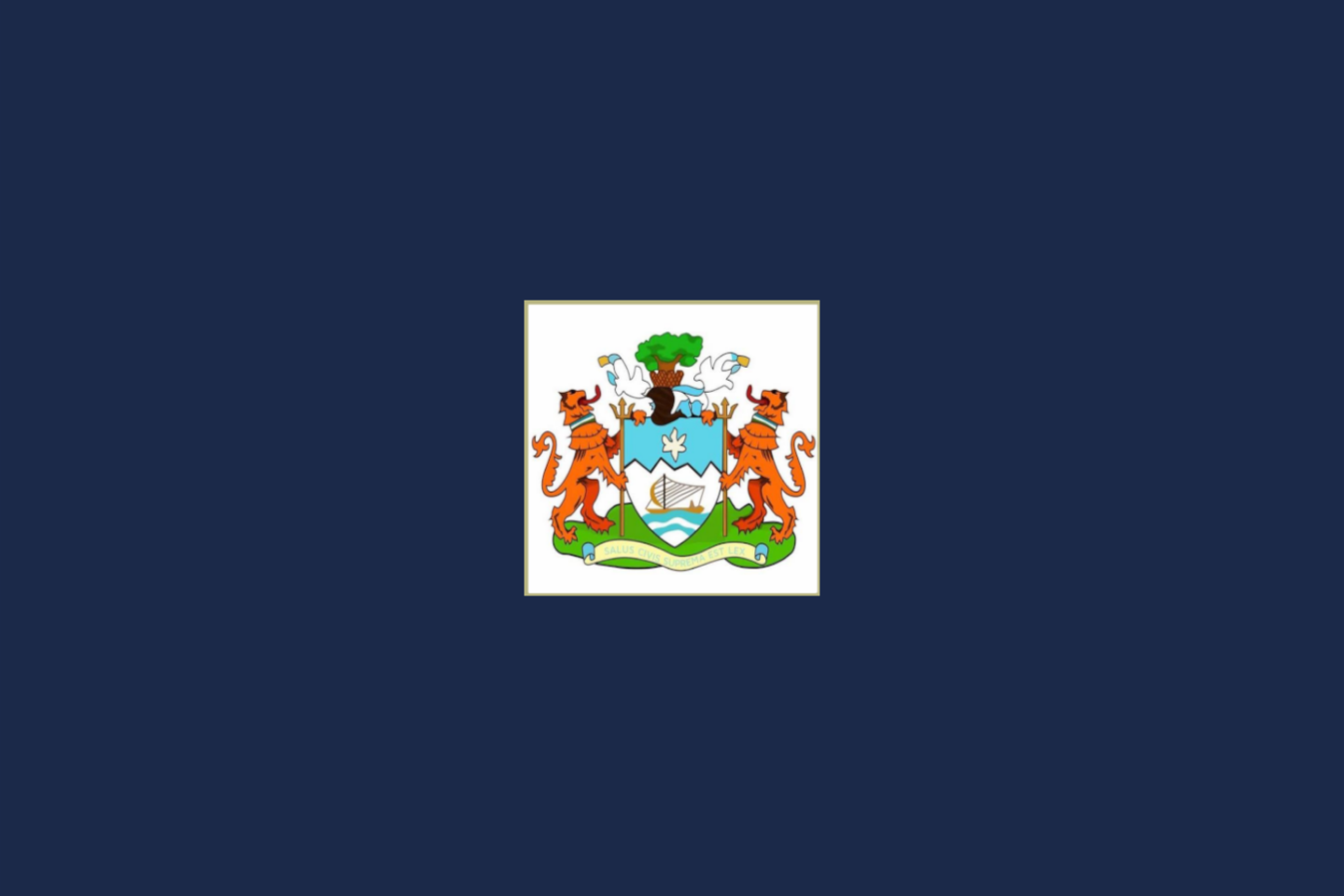
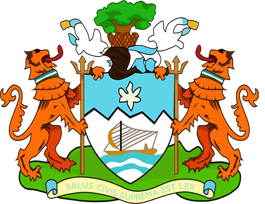
- Flag Seal

- Location within Sierra Leone Location within Africa
- Coordinates: 8°29′14″N 13°14′8″W
- Country: Sierra Leone
- Areas: Western Area
- District: Western Area Urban District
- Founded: March 11, 1792

Government
  - Type: City council
  - Mayor: Yvonne Aki-Sawyerr (APC)

Area
  - Capital city and municipality: 82.48 km^{2} (31.85 sq mi)
- Elevation: 26 m (85 ft)

Population (2024 Census)
  - Capital city and municipality: 1,347,559
  - Density: 16,340/km^{2} (42,320/sq mi)
  - Metro: 1,500,234
- Time zone: UTC±00:00 (GMT)
- Climate: Am
- Website: fcc.gov.sl

Freetown (Krio: Fritɔun) is the capital and largest city of Sierra Leone. It is a major port city on the Atlantic Ocean and is located in the Western Area of the country. Freetown is Sierra Leone's major urban, economic, financial, cultural, educational and political centre, as it is the seat of the Government of Sierra Leone. The population of Freetown was 1,347,559 as of the 2024 census.

The city's economy revolves largely around its harbour, which occupies a part of the estuary of the Sierra Leone River in one of the world's largest natural deep water harbours.

Although the city has traditionally been the homeland of the Sierra Leone Creole people, the population of Freetown is ethnically, culturally, and religiously diverse. The city is home to a significant population of all of Sierra Leone's ethnic groups, with no single ethnic group forming more than 27% of the city's population. As in virtually all parts of Sierra Leone, the Krio language of the Sierra Leone Creole people is Freetown's primary language of communication and is by far the most widely spoken language in the city.

The city of Freetown was founded on March 11, 1792, by 1,196 African Americans under the guidance of abolitionist Lieutenant John Clarkson at the foot of the Cotton Tree, and the city became a settlement for free and freed African American, Afro-Caribbean and Liberated African slaves. Their descendants are known as the Creole people. Before the arrival of Europeans, the local Temne and Loko people were living in villages on the land near the area that later became known as Freetown.

Freetown is locally governed by a directly elected Freetown City Council, headed by a mayor, who also is directly elected; elections are held every four years. The mayor of Freetown is Yvonne Aki Sawyerr, who was sworn in on 11 May 2018, after her victory in the 2018 mayoral election; she was re-elected in 2022.

The Freetown city council has its own municipal police force.

== History ==
The area around the Sierra Leone estuary has been inhabited for millennia. The earliest known group in the area was the Bullom people. In the 1540s and '50s, the Mane people invaded the area and established their own chiefdoms, integrating into the local Bullom. In January 1568, the English slave raider John Hawkins helped the Mane king Flansire destroy Bonga, headquarters of the rebellious chief Falma. Bonga was a town of around 10,000 people located in the area that would become Freetown.

=== Province of Freedom (1787–1789) ===
The area was settled in 1787 by 400 formerly enslaved black people sent from London, England, under the auspices of the Committee for the Relief of the Black Poor, an organisation set up by the English merchant and philanthropist, Jonas Hanway, and the British abolitionist, Granville Sharp. These black people were African Americans, Afro-Caribbeans, Africans, Southeast Asians, and black people born in Great Britain. They established the 'Province of Freedom' and the settlement of Granville Town on land purchased from local Koya Temne subchief King Tom and regent Naimbana. The British understood the purchase meant that their new settlers had the land "for ever." Although the established arrangement between Europeans and the Koya Temne included provisions for permanent settlement, some historians question how well the Koya leaders understood the agreement, as they had a different conception of the uses of property.

Disputes soon broke out. King Tom's successor, King Jimmy, burnt the settlement to the ground in 1789. Alexander Falconbridge was sent to Sierra Leone in 1791 to collect the remaining Black Poor settlers, and they re-established Granville Town around the area now known as Cline Town, Sierra Leone near Fourah Bay. These 1787 settlers did not formally establish Freetown, even though the bicentennial of Freetown was celebrated in 1987; formally, Freetown was founded in 1792.

=== Freetown settlement and the Colony of Sierra Leone (1792–1808) ===
In 1791, Thomas Peters, an African American who had served in the Black Pioneers, went to England to report the grievances of the black population in Nova Scotia. Some of these African Americans were ex-slaves who had escaped to the British forces who had been given their freedom and resettled there by the Crown after the American Revolution.

The area around the Sierra Leone estuary

Land grants and assistance in starting the settlements had been intermittent and slow.

During his visit, Peters met with the directors of the Sierra Leone Company and learned of proposals for a new settlement at Sierra Leone. Despite the collapse of the 1787 colony, the directors were eager to recruit settlers to Sierra Leone. Lieutenant John Clarkson, RN, who was an abolitionist, was sent to Nova Scotia in British North America to register immigrants to take to Sierra Leone for a new settlement.

Tired of the harsh weather and racial discrimination in Nova Scotia, more than 1,100 former American slaves chose to go to Sierra Leone. They sailed in 15 ships and arrived in St. George Bay between 26 February – 9 March 1792. Sixty-four settlers died en route to Sierra Leone, and Lieutenant Clarkson was among those taken ill during the voyage. Upon reaching Sierra Leone, Clarkson and some of the Nova Scotian 'captains' "dispatched on shore to clear or make roadway for their landing". The Nova Scotians were to build Freetown on the former site of the first Granville Town, where jungle had taken over since its destruction in 1789. Its surviving Old Settlers had relocated to Fourah Bay in 1791.

At Freetown, the women remained in the ships while the men worked to clear the land. Lt. Clarkson told the men to clear the land until they reached a large cotton tree (Ceiba pentandra). After the work had been done and the land cleared, all the Nova Scotians, men and women, disembarked and marched towards the thick forest and to the cotton tree, and their preachers (all African Americans) began singing "Awake and Sing of Moses and the Lamb."

In March 1792, Nathaniel Gilbert, a white preacher, prayed and preached a sermon under the large Cotton Tree, and Reverend David George, from South Carolina, preached the first recorded Baptist service in Africa. The land was dedicated and christened 'Free Town,' as ordered by the Sierra Leone Company Directors. This was the first thanksgiving service.

John Clarkson was sworn in as first governor of Sierra Leone. Small huts were erected before the rainy season. The Sierra Leone Company surveyors and the settlers built Freetown on the American grid pattern, with parallel streets and wide roads, with the largest being Water Street. On 24 August 1792, the Black Poor or Old Settlers of the second Granville Town were incorporated into the new Sierra Leone Colony, but remained at Granville Town.

In 1793, the settlers sent a petition to the Sierra Leone Company expressing concerns about the treatment that they were enduring. The settlers in particular objected to being issued currency that was only redeemable at a company owned store. They also claimed that the governor, a Mr. Dawes, ruled in an almost tyrannical fashion, favoring certain people over others when ruling the settlement. The writers then argued that they had not received the amount of land that Lt. Clarkson had promised them on leaving Nova Scotia. The letter expressed anxiety that the company was not treating them as freemen, but as slaves and requested that Lt. Clarkson return as governor.

Freetown survived being pillaged by the French in 1794, and was rebuilt by the settlers. By 1798, Freetown had between 300 and 400 houses with architecture resembling that of the United States – stone foundations with wooden superstructures. Eventually this style of housing, built by the Nova Scotians, would be the model for the 'bod oses' of their Creole descendants.

In 1800, the Nova Scotians rebelled. The colonial authorities used the arrival of about 550 Jamaican Maroons to suppress the insurrection. Thirty-four Nova Scotians were banished and sent to either the Sherbro or a penal colony at Gore. Some of the Nova Scotians were eventually allowed back into Freetown. After the Maroons captured the Nova Scotian rebels, they were granted their land. Eventually the Maroons had their own district, which came to be known as Maroon Town.

=== Freetown as a Crown Colony (1808–1961) ===
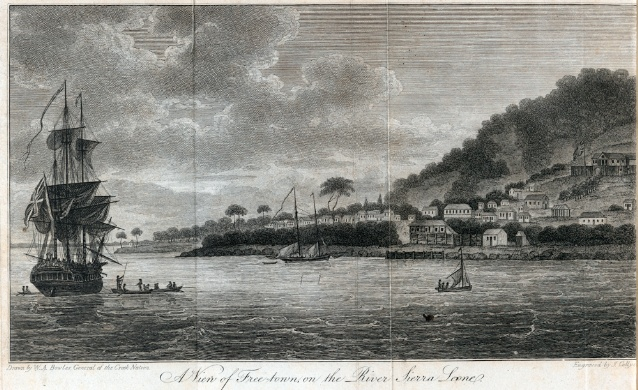
Freetown in 1803

Temne people attacked the colony in 1801 and were repulsed. The British eventually took control of Freetown, making it a Crown Colony in 1808. This act accompanied expansion that led to the creation of Sierra Leone.

From 1808 to 1874, the city served as the capital of British West Africa. It also served as the base for the Royal Navy's Eastern Squadron, which was charged with enforcing the ban on the slave trade. When the squadron liberated slaves on trading ships, they brought most to Sierra Leone, and Freetown in particular; thus, the population grew to include descendants of many different peoples from all over the west coast of Africa. The British also situated three of their Mixed Commission Courts in Freetown.

The Freetown Lodge No. 1955 was the first Orange Lodge formed in Africa. It was established by the British and Irish settlers in the capital. Missionaries taught locals about Protestant Christianity and evangelism.

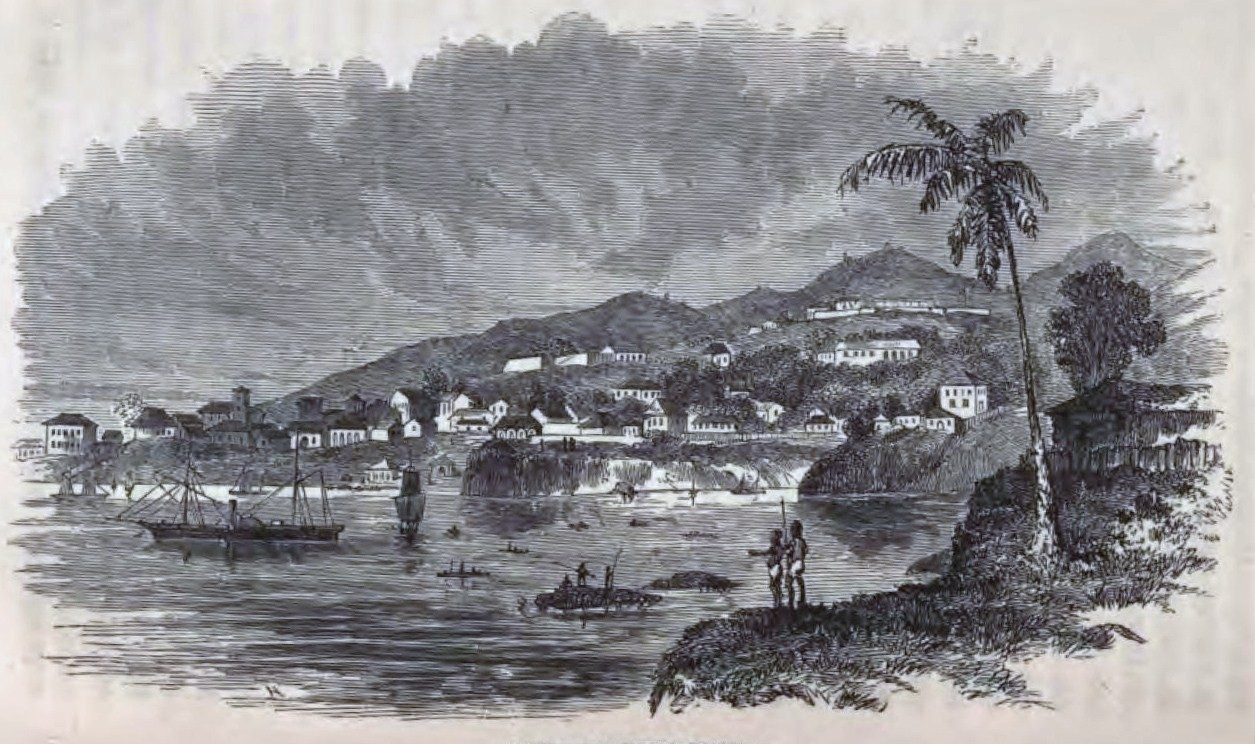
Freetown in 1856

The liberated Africans established the suburbs of Freetown Peninsula. They were the largest group of immigrants to make up the Creole people of Freetown. The city expanded rapidly. The freed slaves were joined by West Indian and African soldiers, who had fought for Britain in the Napoleonic Wars and settled here afterwards. Descendants of the freed slaves who settled in Sierra Leone between 1787 and around 1885, are called the Creoles. The Creoles play a leading role in the city, although they are a minority of the overall Sierra Leone population.

In the 1890s, ethnic tension flared between Lebanese residents and traders and the various native ethnicities of Sierra Leone, which led to Lebanese shops being destroyed in cities including Freetown.

During World War I Freetown became a base for operations of British forces in the Atlantic. Warships came into the port to resupply and German merchant vessels captured in the region were also sent there.

During World War II, Britain maintained a naval base at Freetown. The base was a staging post for Allied traffic in the South Atlantic and the assembly point for SL convoys to Britain. An RAF base was maintained at nearby Lungi airfield. British fighter aircraft which were shipped into Freetown port, were carried on the Sierra Leone Government Railway to Makeni to be assembled and flown to Egypt.

=== Civil war, 1990s to early 2000s ===
The city was the scene of fierce fighting in the late 1990s during the Sierra Leone Civil War. It was captured by ECOWAS troops seeking to restore President Ahmad Tejan Kabbah in 1998. Later it was unsuccessfully attacked by rebels of the Revolutionary United Front.

=== Mudslide disaster, 2017 ===
In the early morning on 14 August 2017, after much heavy rain, part of Mount Sugar Loaf on an edge of Freetown collapsed in a huge mudslide which drowned over 300 people in Regent town. Deforestation has been blamed for the landslide.

=== Sierra Leone fuel tanker explosion, 2021 ===
On 5 November 2021, a fuel tank truck collided with another truck in Freetown, resulting in an explosion killing at least 99 and injuring around 100.

== Geography ==
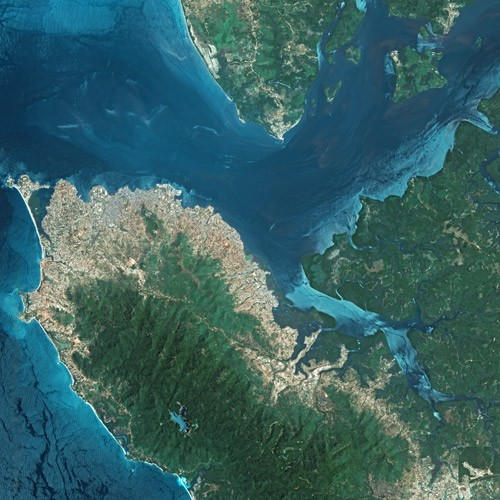
Satellite picture of Freetown, 2006

A map of central Freetown

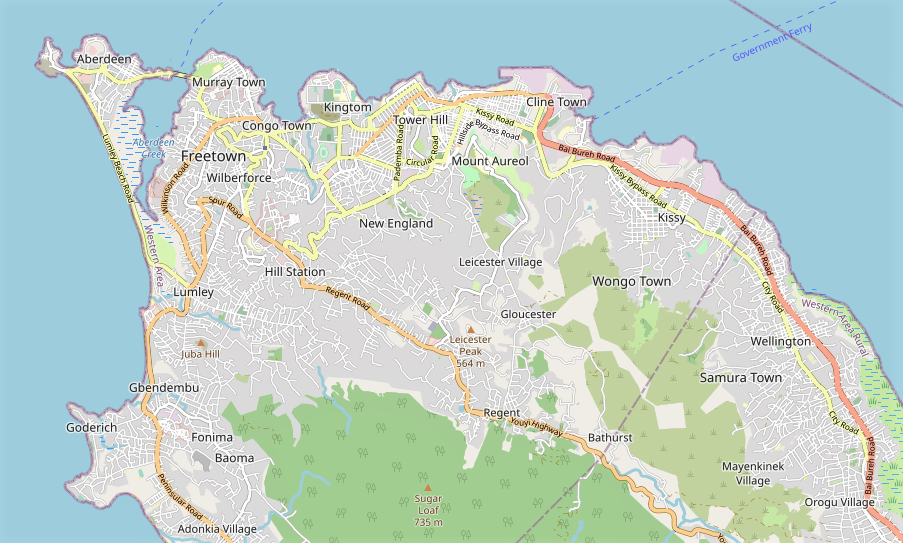
A map showing the broader area of the Freetown Municipality

Freetown borders the Atlantic Ocean and the Western Area Rural District. Freetown municipality is politically divided into three regions: East End, Central and West End of Freetown. The wards in the East End of Freetown (East I, East II, and East III) contain the city's largest population centre and generally the poorest part of the city. The Queen Elizabeth II Quay is located within East End. The Lion Mountains sit southeast to Freetown.

The two central wards (Central I and Central II) make up Central Freetown, which includes Downtown Freetown and the central business district (Central II). Most of the tallest and most important national government building and foreign embassies are based in Central Freetown.

Sierra Leone's House of Parliament and the State House, the principal workplace of the president of Sierra Leone, are on Tower Hill in central Freetown. The National Stadium, the home stadium of the Sierra Leone national football team (popularly known as the Leone Stars) is in the Brookfield neighborhood.

The three westernmost wards (West I, West II, and West III) of the city constitute the West End of Freetown. These wards are relatively affluent. Most of the city's luxury hotels, a number of casinos, and Lumley Beach are in the west end of the city. The West End neighbourhood of Hill Station is home to the State Lodge, the official residence of the president of Sierra Leone.

== Climate ==
Like the rest of Sierra Leone, Freetown has a tropical climate with a rainy season from May through November; the balance of the year represents the dry season. The beginning and end of the rainy season is marked by strong thunderstorms. Under the Köppen climate classification, Freetown has a tropical monsoon climate (Am) primarily due to the heavy amount of precipitation it receives during the rainy season.

Freetown's high humidity is somewhat relieved December through February by the Harmattan, a wind blowing from the Sahara Desert, affording Freetown its coolest period of the year. Temperature extremes recorded in Freetown are from 15 °C (59 °F) to 38 °C (100 °F) all year. The average annual temperature is around 28 °C (82 °F).

In 2021, the city appointed its first heat officer, Eugenia Kargbo, to address the impact of rising temperatures in the city.

Climate data for Freetown, Sierra Leone (1961–1990, extremes 1947–1990)
Month	Jan	Feb	Mar	Apr	May	Jun	Jul	Aug	Sep	Oct	Nov	Dec	Year
Record high °C (°F)	36.0 (96.8)	38.0 (100.4)	38.0 (100.4)	38.5 (101.3)	35.0 (95.0)	35.0 (95.0)	33.0 (91.4)	32.0 (89.6)	31.0 (87.8)	35.0 (95.0)	36.5 (97.7)	33.5 (92.3)	38.5 (101.3)
Mean daily maximum °C (°F)	29.9 (85.8)	30.3 (86.5)	30.9 (87.6)	31.2 (88.2)	30.9 (87.6)	30.1 (86.2)	28.7 (83.7)	28.4 (83.1)	29.0 (84.2)	29.9 (85.8)	30.1 (86.2)	29.7 (85.5)	29.9 (85.9)
Daily mean °C (°F)	27.3 (81.1)	27.6 (81.7)	28.1 (82.6)	28.5 (83.3)	28.3 (82.9)	27.4 (81.3)	26.3 (79.3)	25.9 (78.6)	26.4 (79.5)	27.1 (80.8)	27.7 (81.9)	27.5 (81.5)	27.3 (81.2)
Mean daily minimum °C (°F)	23.8 (74.8)	24.0 (75.2)	24.4 (75.9)	24.8 (76.6)	24.4 (75.9)	23.6 (74.5)	23.1 (73.6)	23.0 (73.4)	23.1 (73.6)	23.4 (74.1)	24.0 (75.2)	24.1 (75.4)	23.8 (74.9)
Record low °C (°F)	15.0 (59.0)	17.8 (64.0)	19.4 (66.9)	20.0 (68.0)	20.6 (69.1)	20.0 (68.0)	19.4 (66.9)	19.4 (66.9)	20.0 (68.0)	19.4 (66.9)	20.0 (68.0)	15.6 (60.1)	15.0 (59.0)
Average rainfall mm (inches)	8.0 (0.31)	6.0 (0.24)	28.0 (1.10)	68.0 (2.68)	214.0 (8.43)	522.0 (20.55)	1,190 (46.85)	1,078 (42.44)	800.0 (31.50)	333.0 (13.11)	148.0 (5.83)	38.0 (1.50)	4,433 (174.54)
Average rainy days	0	0	1	4	15	22	27	27	24	21	9	2	152
Average relative humidity (%) (at 15:00 Local Time)	66	67	67	68	73	76	81	82	80	78	76	69	74
Average dew point °C (°F)	21.8 (71.2)	22.3 (72.1)	22.7 (72.9)	23.4 (74.1)	24.1 (75.4)	23.9 (75.0)	23.6 (74.5)	23.5 (74.3)	23.7 (74.7)	24.0 (75.2)	24.2 (75.6)	22.7 (72.9)	23.3 (74.0)
Mean monthly sunshine hours	226.3	215.6	232.5	207.0	189.1	153.0	102.3	86.8	126.0	186.0	198.0	161.2	2,083.8
Source 1: NOAA, Deutscher Wetterdienst (extremes),
Source 2: Worldwide Bioclimatic Classification System

== Demographics ==
Freetown is home to a large population of both Muslims and Christians, though Muslims make up the majority of the population. In the youth populations of both faiths can be found a significant liberal influence. Like the rest of Sierra Leone, Freetown is a religiously tolerant city, with Muslims and Christians living side by side peacefully.

As in many parts of Sierra Leone, the Krio language (the English-based creole language of the Sierra Leone Creole people who make up 5% of the country's population) is by far the most widely spoken language in the city. The language is spoken at home as a first language by over 20% of the city's population and is spoken as a lingua franca by a large number of the population in the city. English (the country's official language) is also widely spoken, particularly by the well-educated. Themne is the second most spoken language in Freetown after Krio. The Themne people also make up the largest members of the population of Freetown and the Western Area Region.

Historical population
Year	Pop.	±%
1974	276,247	—
1985	469,776	+70.1%
2004	772,873	+64.5%
2015	1,055,964	+36.6%
2024	1,347,559	+27.6%

== Government ==
The city of Freetown is one of Sierra Leone's six municipalities and is governed by a directly elected city council, headed by a mayor, in whom executive authority is vested. The current mayor is Yvonne Aki-Sawyerr. The mayor is responsible for the general management of the city. The mayor and members of the Freetown City Council are elected directly by the residents of Freetown every four years.

The government of the Freetown Municipality has been dominated by All People's Congress (APC) since 2004. Since 2004, the residents of Freetown have voted in municipal elections for members of the All People's Congress (APC) by an overwhelming majority. The APC won the city's mayorship and vast majority seats in the Freetown city council in the 2004, 2008, 2012 and 2018 local elections by more than 67% each.

In Presidential elections Freetown is considered a swing city, as it has a large support base of both the All People's Congress and the Sierra Leone People's Party. However, the APC has won majority percent of the votes in Freetown in the 2007, 2012 and 2018 Sierra Leone Presidential election, including The APC winning more than 65% of the votes in Freetown in both The 2012 and 2018 Sierra Leone Presidential elections. The APC presidential candidate Ernest Bai Koroma received 69% of the votes in Freetown in the 2012 Sierra Leone Presidential election; compared to the SLPP presidential candidate Julius Maada Bio who received 30%. In the 2018 Sierra Leone Presidential election, The APC presidential candidate Samura Kamara received 65% compared to the SLPP presidential candidate Julius Maada Bio who received 34%, though Maada Bio won the presidential election nationally.

In November 2011, Freetown Mayor Herbert George-Williams was removed from office and replaced by council member Alhaji Gibril Kanu as acting mayor. Mayor Herbert George-Williams and eight others, including the Chief Administrator of the Freetown city council Bowenson Fredrick Philips; and the Freetown city council Treasurer Sylvester Momoh Konnehi, were arrested and indicted by the Sierra Leone Anti-corruption Commission on twenty-five counts on graft charges, ranging from conspiracy to commit corruption to misappropriation of public funds. Mayor Herbert George-Williams was acquitted of seventeen of the nineteen charges against him. He was convicted of two less serious charges by the Freetown High Court judge Jon Bosco Katutsi and sentenced to pay a fine.

Acting Mayor Kanu lost the APC nomination for the mayor of Freetown in the 2012 Mayoral elections by 56 votes; council member Sam Franklyn Bode Gibson won 106 in a landslide victory.

In the national presidential and parliamentary elections, Freetown is similar to swing states in American politics. As the city is so ethnically diverse, no single ethnic group forms a majority of the population of the city. Historically, the APC and the SLPP, two of the country's major political parties, have had about equal support in the city. In the 2007 Sierra Leone Presidential election, the APC candidate and then main opposition leader, Ernest Bai Koroma, won just over 60% of the votes in the Western Area Urban District, including the city of Freetown, where almost the entire District population reside.

== Culture ==
The city has the Sierra Leone National Museum and Sierra Leone National Railway Museum. There are also various historical landmarks connected to its founding by African Americans, Liberated Africans, and Afro-Caribbeans whose descendants are the Sierra Leone Creole people. The Cotton Tree represents the christening of Freetown in March 1792. In downtown Freetown is the Connaught Hospital, the first hospital constructed in West Africa that incorporated Western medical practices.

Freetown has a long-held tradition of organized cultural events taking place on specific dates to coincide with specific holidays or seasons within the calendar year. One such event is the Eastern Paddle Hunting Society's annual exhibition of a highly sophisticated masquerade, consisting of a costume built, in a fashionable sense, of various materials available: leather, sequins, sea shells, traditional cloths, etc. The masquerade, known as "Paddle", strategically takes to the streets of the eastern and central parts of the city, followed by members of the Eastern Paddle Hunting Society, traditional musical bands and a crowd of supporters. For years this event coincided with the Muslim holiday of Eid al-Adha until recently, as critics said such an event should not be held on the same day as Muslims celebrate Eid, as Islam is against the practices of secret societies and masquerades.

The "Tangays" Festival is usually held in November, with a traditional theme that involves virtually every aspect of Sierra Leonean culture. It takes place at the National Stadium. Towards the end of the festival, a couple of musical concerts are usually held in the main bowl of the stadium, with performances from local and international musical artists (especially contemporary artists from Nigeria and other African countries or the African diaspora).

Freetown has its own tradition of Christmas street parades, organised in neighbourhoods across the city. The month-long celebration gathers residents in the streets with a variety of food and traditional music.

The Lantan (Lantern) Festival takes place on the last day of Ramadan each year. After a long month of fasting, participants spend the day at home eating, praying, and later head out to clubs to celebrate. That night, communities gather to showcase elaborate lantans. A designated area in the capital, Freetown, serves as the judging point, where the judges (an organization known as the YMMA) evaluate the lantans at two key locations. Each lantan is mounted on a wheeled iron chassis and hauled through the city by lantan clubs, often moving to the beat of classic Sierra Leonean tunes and instrumentals played by club members. The lantans are large and intricate, sometimes built in the form of animals, humans, mythical beings, and warships, stretching twenty feet long and up to ten feet high, providing a platform for social commentary by incorporating cultural themes and representing political themes relevant to Freetown's history with colonialism.

As the lantans move through the city, they are lit from within electric bulbs powered by generators, creating a glowing spectacle. Onlookers would fill the city, leaving no bar, allet, or street corner empty. Club members, dressed in matching aswebi (family attire), dancing and singing along to the music filling the streets. Judges assess by the coordination of the group and the creativity of the aswebi, but mainly the lantan's design.

== Tourism ==
Freetown's tourism sector is an integral part of the city. Although the sector was seriously affected during the Civil War, there has been a steady improvement in recent years. The city has a lot to offer to tourists. There is a vast expanse of white sand beaches stretching along the Freetown Peninsula. The Lumley-Aberdeen beach stretches all the way from Cape Sierra Leone down to Lumley. There are also other popular beaches like the world renowned River Number 2 Beach, Laka Beach, Tokeh Beach, Bureh Beach, and Mama Beach. The Tacugama Chimpanzee Sanctuary, which is located within the peninsula's vast rainforest reserve, just a few miles from the centre of Freetown, has a collection of rare and endangered chimpanzees. Other popular destinations for tourists include the Freetown Cotton Tree, located in Central Freetown, a significant national monument and integral to the founding of the city; Bunce Island, which is a boat ride from the city, is home to the ruins of the slave fortress that was being used during the Transatlantic slave trade; the Sierra Leone Museum, which has a collection of both precolonial as well as colonial artifacts and other items of historical significance; the National Railway Museum; and a journey around the city's coastline with the popular Seacoach Express.

The Aberdeen-Lumley area is a favourite destination for those venturing into the city's nightlife. There are nightclubs, restaurants and hotels located close by the beach along the road linking Aberdeen and Lumley.

== Architecture ==
Nearby is the King's Yard Gate built in stone with a statement inscribed which reads "any slave who passes through this gate is declared a free man", and it was this gate through which liberated Africans passed. Down by the Naval Wharf are slave steps carved out of stone. Before Freetown was established, this was where the Portuguese slave traders transported Africans as slaves to ships.

Freetown is home to Fourah Bay College, the oldest university in West Africa, founded in 1827. The university played a key role in Sierra Leone's colonial history. The college's first student, Samuel Ajayi Crowther, went on to be named as the first indigenous Bishop of West Africa. National Railway Museum has a coach car built for the state visit of Elizabeth II in 1961. The Big Market on Wallace Johnson Street is the showcase for local artisans' work.

The Freetown peninsula is ringed by long stretches of white sand. Lumley Beach, on the western side of the peninsula, is a popular location for local parties and festivals.

== Places of worship ==
Among the places of worship, Christian churches predominate and the remaining religious institutions are predominantly Muslim mosques. Among the Christian churches and temples: Roman Catholic Archdiocese of Freetown (Catholic Church), United Methodist Church in Sierra Leone (World Methodist Council), Baptist Convention of Sierra Leone (Baptist World Alliance), Assemblies of God, and St. George's Cathedral (Anglican) which opened in 1828.

== Economy ==
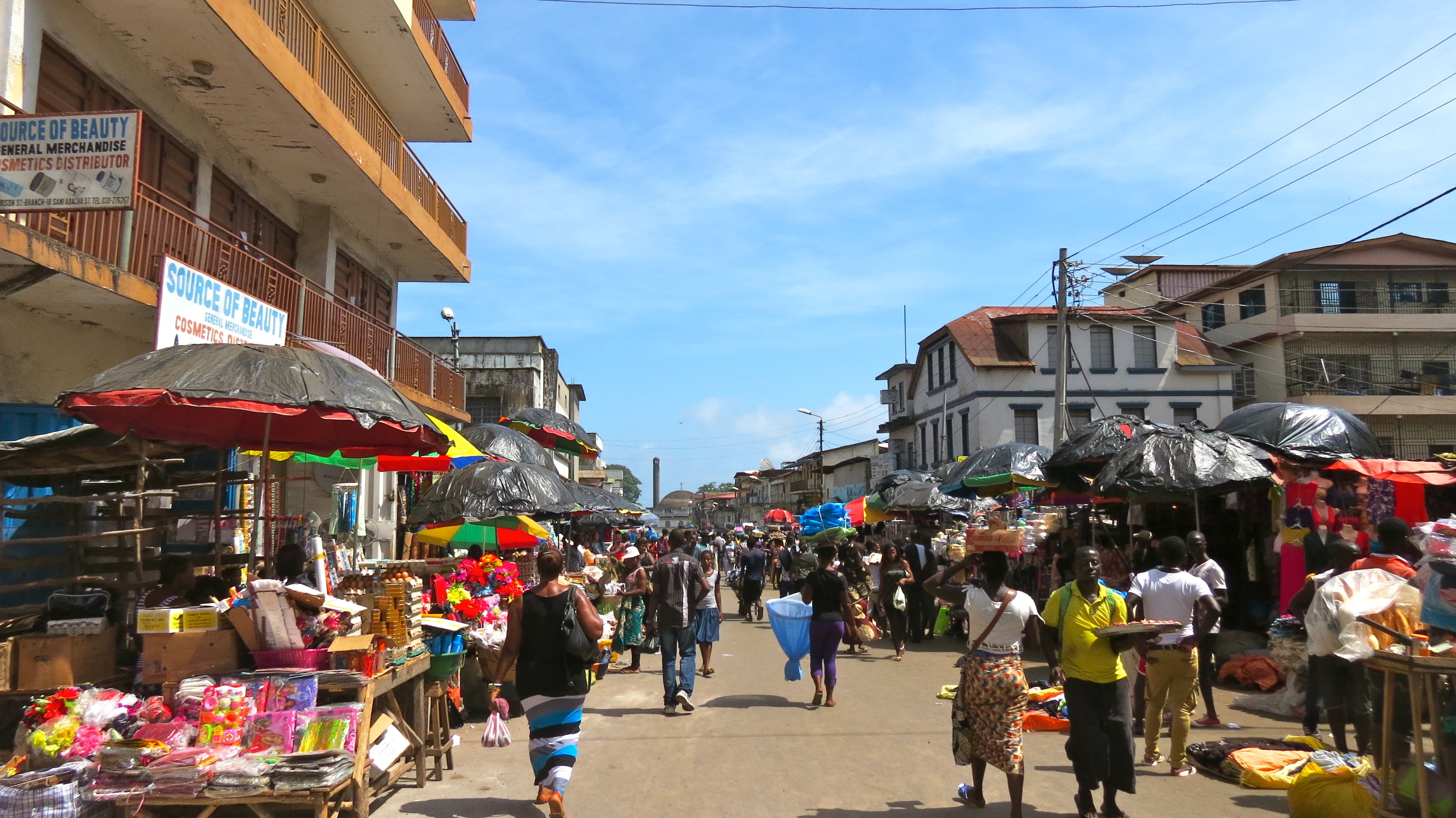
A local market street in Central Freetown

Freetown is the economic and financial centre of Sierra Leone. The country's state television and radio station, the Sierra Leone Broadcasting Corporation, is primarily based in Freetown. The other national broadcasters, such as AYV (African Young Voices) and Capital Radio, are also based in Freetown. Many of the national headquarters of the country's largest corporations, as well as the majority of international companies, are located in Freetown - predominately in Central Freetown.

The city's economy revolves largely around its natural harbour, which is the largest natural harbour on the African continent. Queen Elizabeth II Quay is capable of receiving oceangoing vessels and handles Sierra Leone's main exports.

Industries include food and beverage processing, fish packing, rice milling, petroleum refining, diamond cutting, and the manufacture of cigarettes, paint, textile, and beer.

The city is served by the Freetown International Airport, located in Lungi, across the river estuary from Freetown.

In almost every neighborhood of Freetown there are a number of high streets with shops of various kinds of commercial products and services. Shop traders are diverse, including locals and foreign shop owners. However, a majority of locals shop at specific and popular areas of the city, such as Lumley Junction, Eastern Police Junction, PZ area, Shell Junction, etc.

== Gallery ==
Some other notable places in Freetown

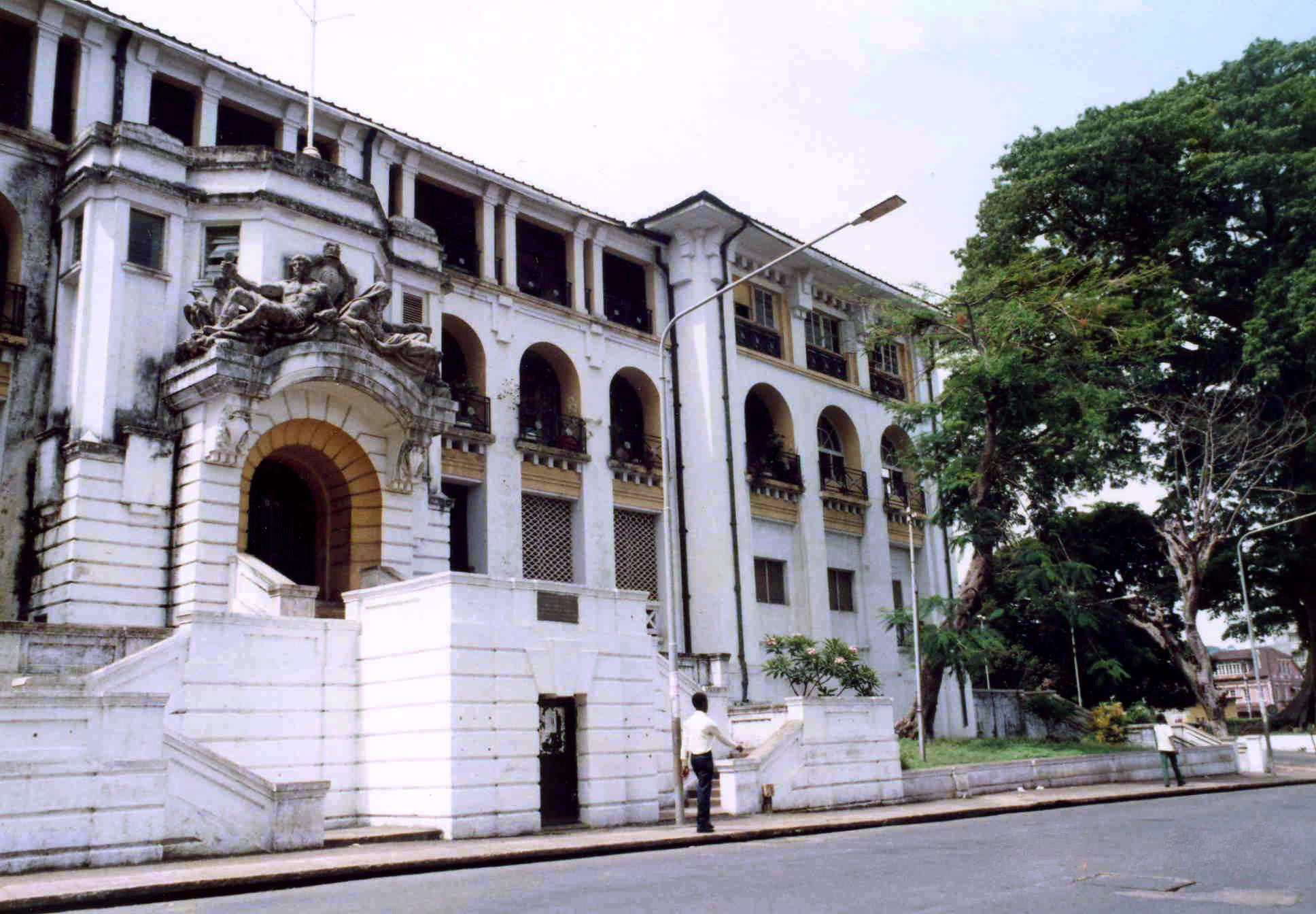
Law Courts Building, Siaka Stevens Street

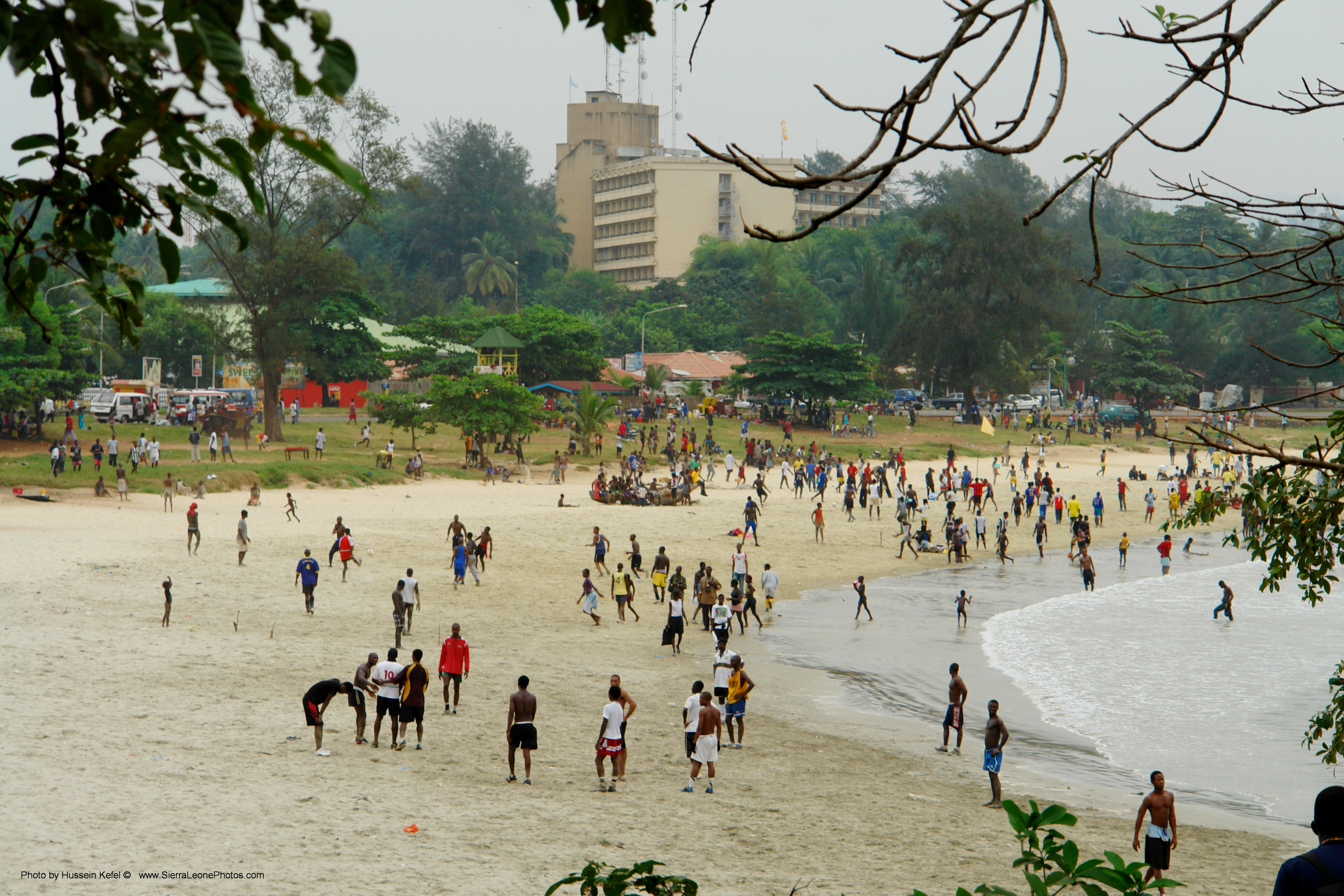
Lumley Beach

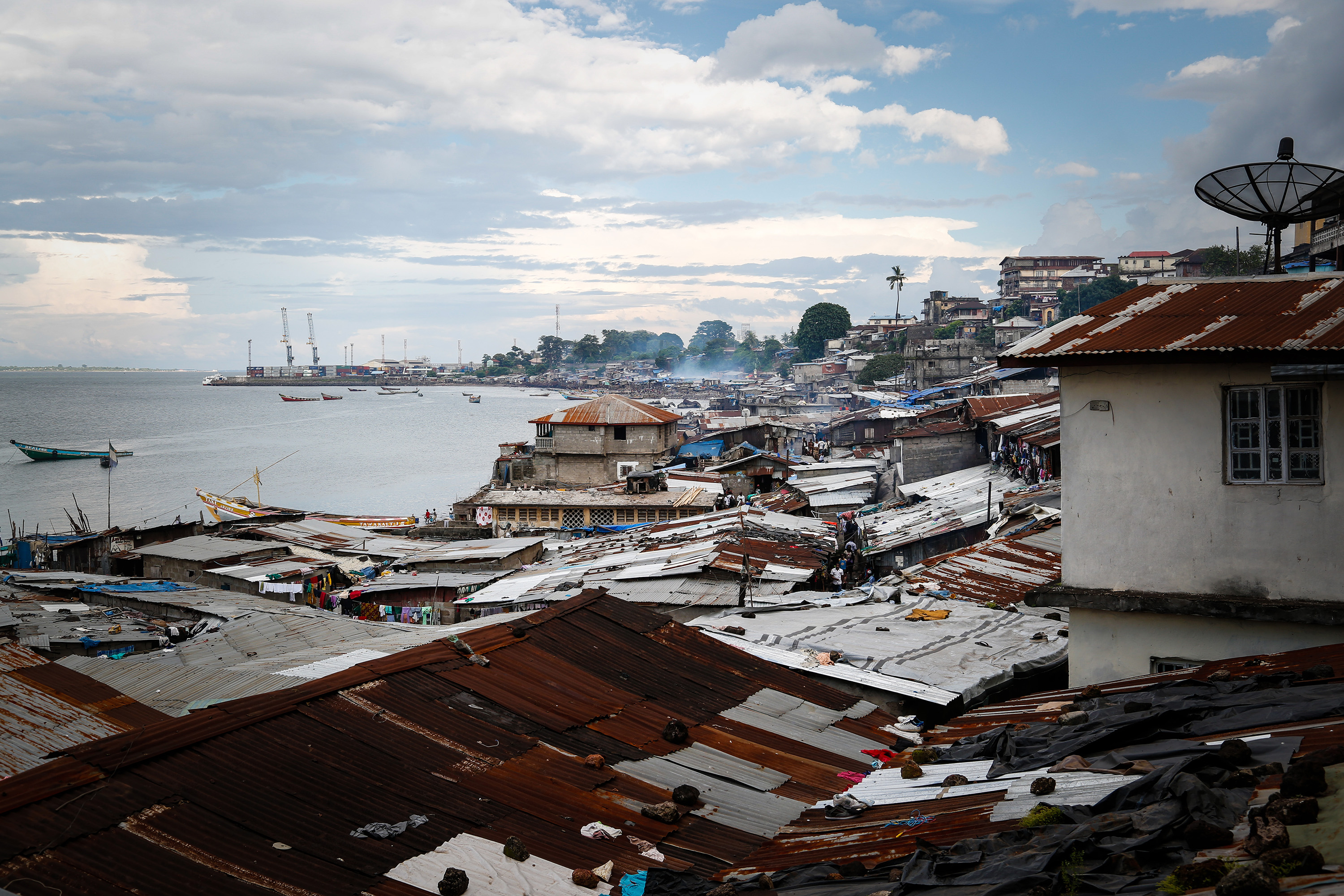
Freetown's highly congested Magazine Wharf neighbourhood – which was hit hard during the 2014 Ebola crisis

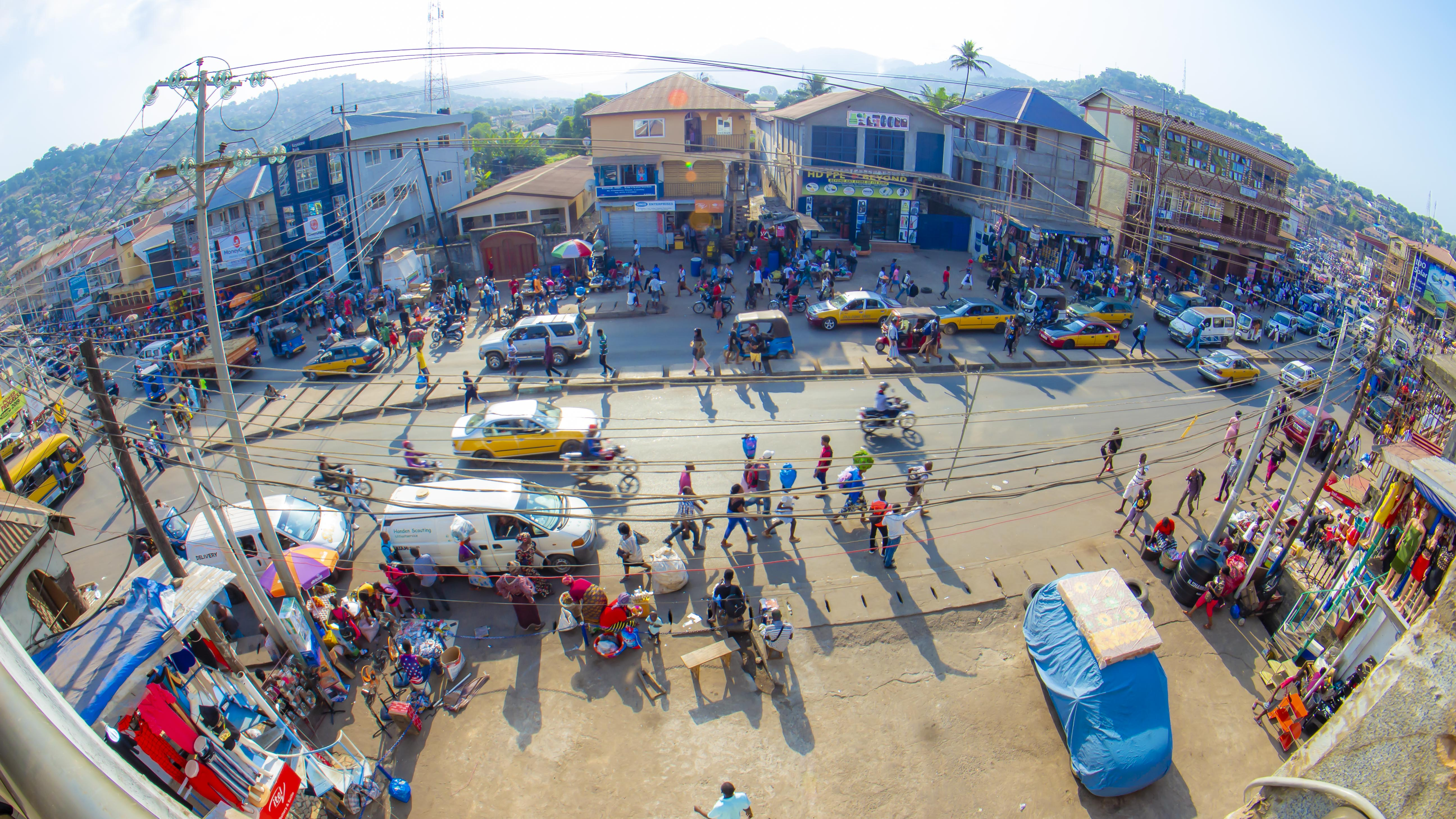
Lumley area

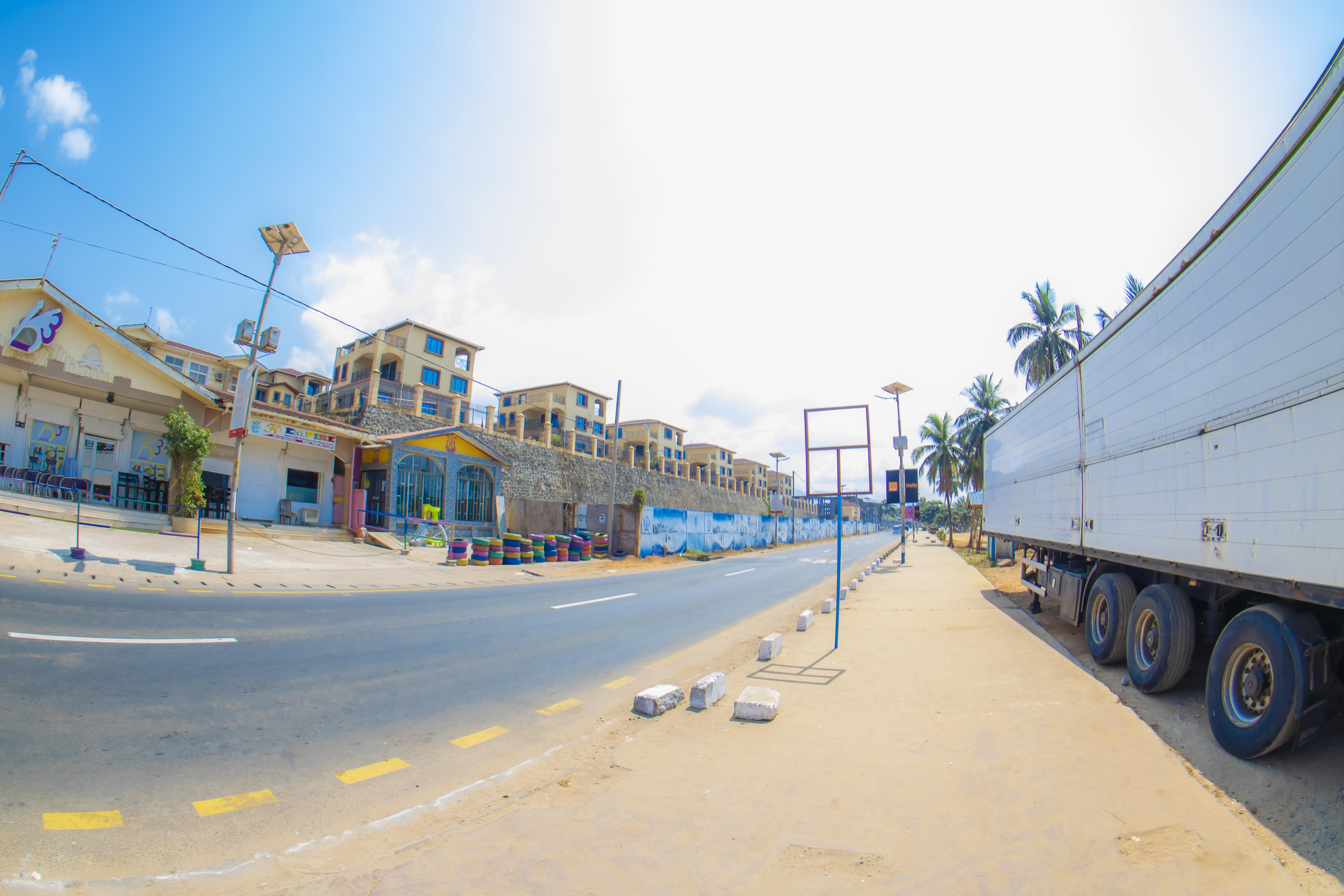
Aberdeen

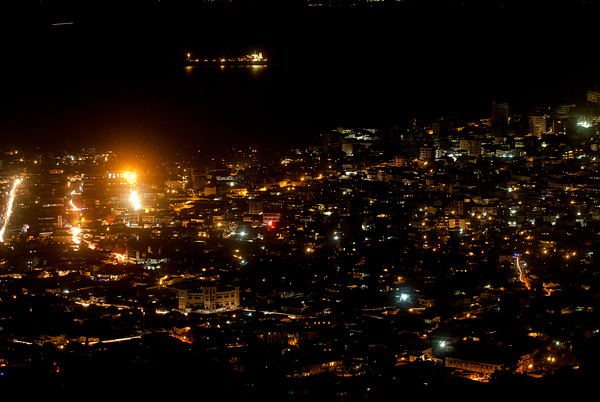
Night view of Central Freetown

== Education ==
Freetown (as the rest of Sierra Leone) has an education system with six years of primary school (Classes 1 to 6), and six years of secondary school (Forms 1 to 6). Secondary schools are further divided into Junior secondary school (Forms 1 to 3) and Senior secondary school (Forms 4 to 6). This system is known as the 6-3-3-4 education system, which means: 6 years of Primary, 3 years of Junior Secondary, 3 years of Senior Secondary, and 4 years of university.

Primary school pupils are usually aged 6 to 12, and secondary schools are usually aged 13 to 18. Primary Education is free and compulsory in government-sponsored public schools. Freetown is home to one of the country's two main universities, the Fourah Bay College, the oldest university in West Africa, founded in 1827.

== Transportation ==
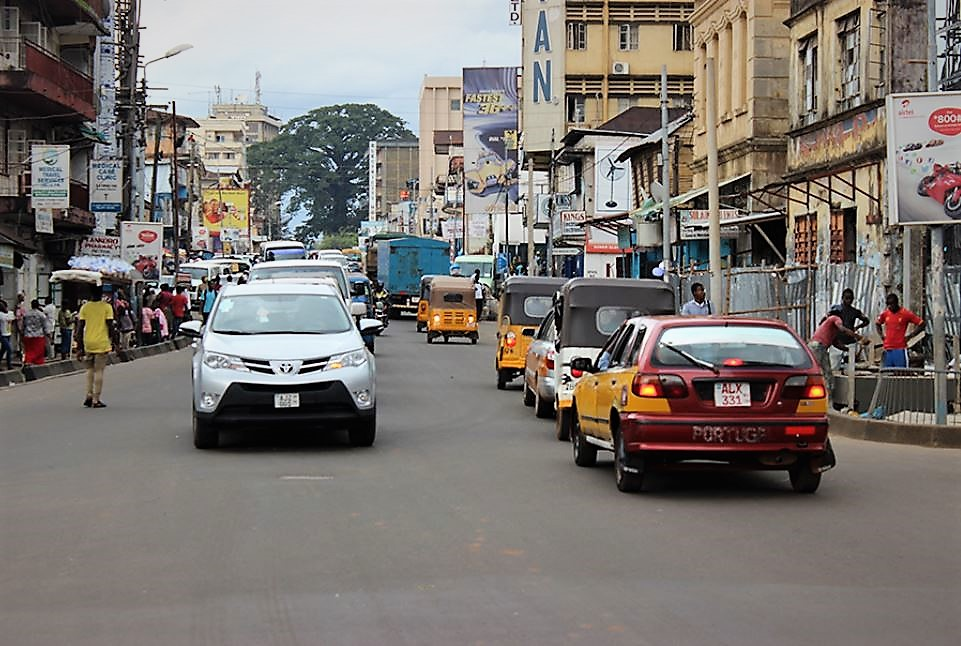
A normal day Freetown street with "Keke", regular taxis and private vehicles on the road

=== Air transportation ===
Freetown International Airport is the international airport which serves Freetown and the rest of the country. It is located in the town of Lungi, about 17 km north-east of Freetown across the sea. It serves as the primary airport for domestic and international travel to and from Sierra Leone. The airport is operated by Sierra Leone Airports Authority. There is a frequent commercial fast boat, bus, and ferry service to Freetown and other parts of the country. Hastings Airport provides secondary service, but can only handle small aircraft because of its short runway. It is located about 14 km south-east of downtown Freetown (nearly 22 km by road).

==== Transfers to Freetown ====
Passengers have the choice of hovercraft, ferry, road (5 hours), speedboat, water taxi, local banana boats and helicopter to cross the river to Freetown. Ferry is the cheapest option. Hovercraft and ferry operations have at times been suspended due to passenger overloads and safety issues. Several piers are unusable at low-tide. During these times, there is no dry path from land to the speedboats or water taxi. Operators offer from the beachhead to hoist passengers and their luggage above water-level while themselves wade into the sea to help patrons and their belongings board.

=== Access by sea ===
Sierra Leone has the largest natural harbour on the African continent. Ships from all over the globe berth at Freetown's Queen Elizabeth II Quay. Passenger, cargo, and private craft also utilize Government Wharf nearer to central Freetown. Recent investment has seen the introduction of high-tech cargo scanning facilities.

=== Access by land ===
==== Road ====
Sierra Leone's infrastructure is limited, and its highways and roads reflect this. The roads and highways of the country are administered by the Sierra Leone Roads Authority (SLRA) which has often been crippled by corruption. Highway 1 enters the city from the town of Waterloo, several kilometers to the south. Despite the SLRA's limited capabilities, main feeder/trunk roads have been reconstructed to a high standard.

==== Railway ====
Following a recommendation from the International Bank for Reconstruction and Development, the Sierra Leone Government Railway which linked Freetown to the rest of the country was permanently closed in 1974. The iron rails were looted in the following years.

== Sports ==
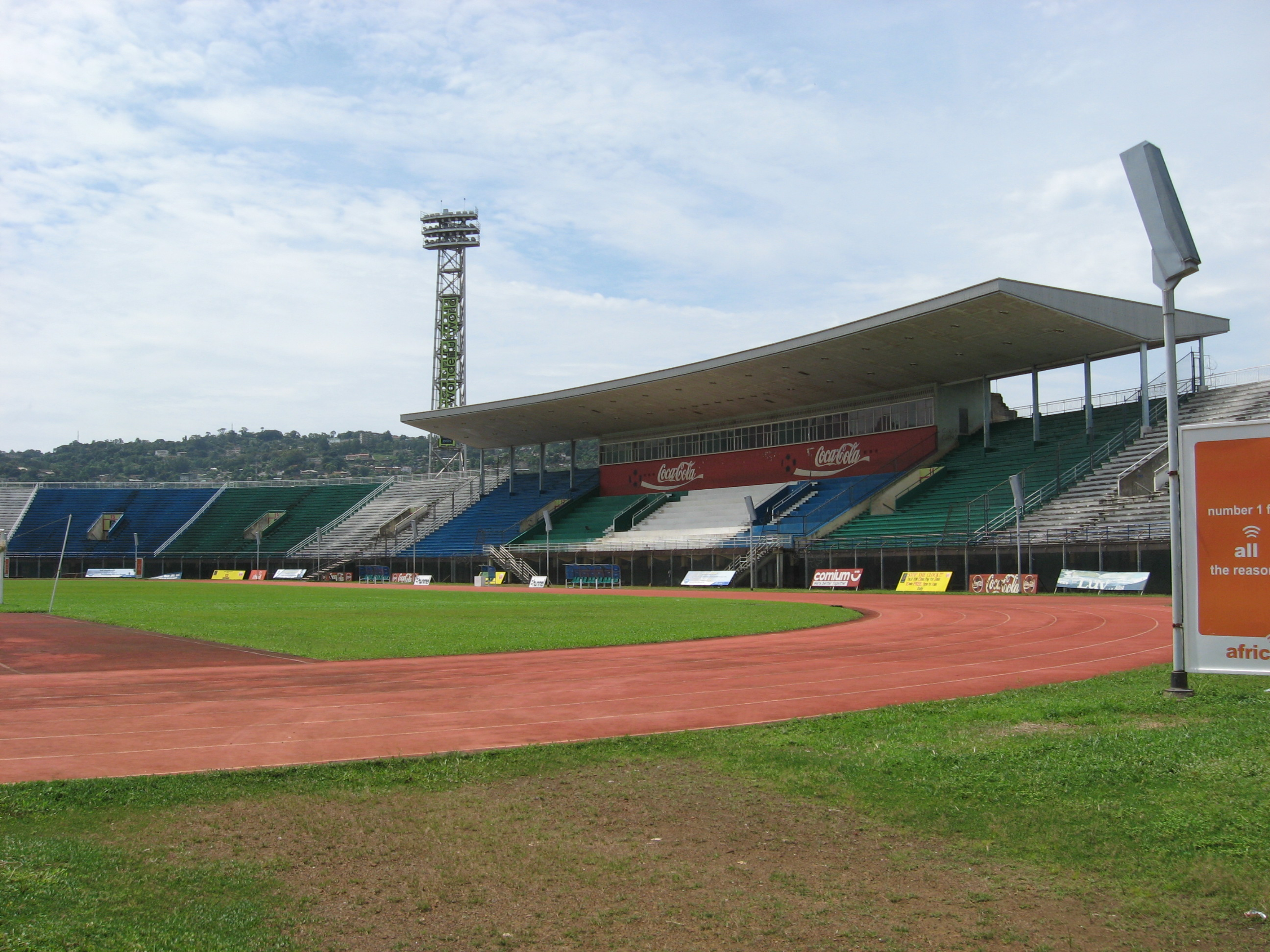
The National Stadium

Like the rest of Sierra Leone, football is the most popular sport in Freetown. The Sierra Leone national football team, popularly known as the Leone Stars plays all their home games at Freetown's National Stadium, the largest stadium in Sierra Leone.

Eight of the fifteen clubs in the Sierra Leone National Premier League are from Freetown, including two of Sierra Leone's biggest and most successful football clubs, East End Lions and Mighty Blackpool. A match between these two teams is the biggest domestic-football clash in Sierra Leone. A notable Sierra Leonian footballer is Kei Kamara, who plays for Los Angeles FC of Major League Soccer.

== Twin towns/sister cities ==
Freetown is officially twinned with five cities:

City	Province / Region / State	Country	Year	Ref
Charleston	South Carolina	(United States)	2019	
Hefei	Anhui	(China)	1984	
Kansas City	Missouri	(United States)	1974	
Kingston upon Hull	England	(United Kingdom)	1979	
New Haven	Connecticut	(United States)		

== See also ==
- List of people from Freetown

== Bibliography ==
- Rodney, Walter (1970). A history of the Upper Guinea Coast 1545 to 1800. Oxford: Clarendon Press.
