= Jawei Chiefdom =

- Chiefdom
- Interactive map of Jawei Chiefdom
- Coordinates: 7°59′30″N 10°50′00″W
- Country: Sierra Leone
- Province: Eastern Province
- District: Kailahun District
- Capital: Daru

Population (2004)
  - Total: 42,635
- Time zone: UTC+0 (GMT)

Jawei Chiefdom is a chiefdom in Kailahun District of Sierra Leone with a population of 42,635. Its largest town and headquarters is Daru.

== Geography ==
Jawei Chiefdom is located on the southwestern edge of Kailahun District, bordering Dama Chiefdom and Gaura Chiefdom of Kenema District to the southwest. Jawei borders Jaluahun Chiefdom to the northwest, Mandu Chiefdom to the northeast, and Malema Chiefdom to the southeast. The Moa River transects the chiefdom.

=== Settlements ===
The other important town in Jawei Chiefdom is Benduma. Villages in Jawei dChiefdom include Bombohun, Nyedehun, Gbajorma, Tomboma, Folu, Giehun, Guma, Karlu, Karlu Kambama, Kutoma, Manowah, Mamabu, Bembeyeima, Pellie and Potoru

=== Economy ===
The economy is primarily agricultural; however there is some mining. The primary export is palm oil.

== Civil war ==
During the 1991-2002 civil war various villages in northern Jawei Chiefdom were occupied by the Revolutionary United Front (RUF) and National Patriotic Front of Liberia ((NPFL)) during their initial on-thrust in Spring 1991. The RUF got as far as Benduma, but did not attack Daru or the Moa Barracks across the river, where the Sierra Leone Army (SLA) was based. Guinean troops soon arrived in Daru to support the SLA. The Guineans attacked and drove the RUF out of Benduma, after which battle neither side stationed troops there. In June 1991, RUF and NPFL attacked the Moa Barracks at Daru, but despite the gallantry of the NPFL commander, who was killed on the bridge over the Moa, the Guinean troops and the SLA turned back the assault. Fighting continued in Jawei Chiefdom over the next two years with little change in territory. In December 1992, after an almost successful RUF attack on nearby Segbwema in Jaluahun Chiefdom, some of the Guinean troops were sent from the Moa Barracks to Segbwema. At that same time local hunters, often members of secret hunting societies, began to form into auxiliary units to assist the SLA in Jawei Chiefdom. Finally in May 1993, the SLA with the assistance of these "civilian" units were able to dislodge the RUF from their bases in northern Jawei.

Nonetheless, RUF guerrilla warfare continued in the chiefdom and it was still considered unsafe during the February 1996 elections. Shortly after the election, local chiefs were encouraged to send their young men to Kamajor society initiations after which they were formed into Civil Defence Forces (CDF) units. Prior to this the local hunters were under the command of their own chiefs, but this changed them into a state force. With this new status the Jawei CDF units began attacking RUF positions without SLA support. By January 1997, some Jawei forces were fighting as far away as Upper Bambara Chiefdom. By September 1997 the Jawei Kamajors had all of Jawei Chiefdom under their control and the guerrilla war there ceased.

In March 1998, Nigerian ECOMOG forces arrived in Daru to support the Kamajors. But this had the effect of drawing combined RUF and Armed Forces Revolutionary Council (AFRC) forces to attack Daru which they did several times during 1998 and early 1999. The last such attack was on 7 July 1999, just two days before the ceasefire mandated in the Lomé Peace Accord. But the fighting continued anyway with the Kamajors attacking RUF/AFRC positions at Daru Junction on 17 July, driving them out. But the RUF/AFRC recaptured Daru Junction a month later.

In Spring 2000 with the arrival of UNAMSIL personnel disarmament started in Jawei Chiefdom, where a Disarmament, Demobilisation and Reintegration Camp had been set up in November the previous year. But it was interrupted in May by resistance to the northeast. The process was only restarted in late July.

== Recent history ==
A boundary dispute between Jawei and Malema Chiefdom, arising in 2004 out of the dislocations suffered during the civil war, was settled in 2007 at the direction of the president Bai Koroma.

In September 2009 the chiefdom suffered serve and unusual flooding as the Moa River over flowed. Chief Fadah Kallon said that it was the first such flood ever to hit the chiefdom. The flood has been partially attributed to the chronic deforestation that occurs in Sierra Leone.
