= Guinea–Sierra Leone relations =

- Guinea: Sierra Leone

Guinea and Sierra Leone

The Guinea–Sierra Leone relations are foreign relations between two neighbouring West African nations. After gaining independence (Guinea in 1958 and Sierra Leone in 1961) initial relations between the two countries in the Cold War context turned to be tense due to conservative strategy of Sierra Leone (advocating strong links with the former Metropole) and much more Pan-African and pro-socialist leanings of Guinea.

In 1960 Sierra Leone invited President of Guinea Ahmed Sékou Touré to visit Freetown (his first official state visit since 1958 independence) where he together with Chief Minister of Sierra Leone Milton Margai described their countries as "sister states" and expressed their commitment for further cooperation with Milton Margai visiting Guinea next year on his return trip. In 1961 Guinea was among the countries that officially sponsored Sierra Leone's candidacy for membership in the United Nations. Initial tense relations nevertheless improved more significantly only after Albert Margai got into power in Sierra Leone in 1964 leading to 1967 Mutual Defence Pact. Two countries signed the Framework Agreement on Cooperation on October 10, 1964 to which specific agreements on trade, payments, telecommunications, transport, cultural exchange and legal convention were attached. Siaka Stevens took power in Sierra Leone in 1967 with Guinean troops intervening per request to help him stay in power in what was the first intervention by one sub-Saharan African state in another in 1971. At the time of intervention Sierra Leone left the Commonwealth realm and became a republic.

In 2001, during Sierra Leone's civil war, the Republic of Guinea sent troops into the city of Yenga to help the army of Sierra Leone suppress the rebel Revolutionary United Front. After the rebels were quashed, the Guinean soldiers remained in Yenga. Prior to the civil war Yenga was administered by the Kailahun District of Sierra Leone. In 2002 Sierra Leone and Guinea signed an agreement than Yenga would be returned to Sierra Leone, as soon as Guinea's border could be secured. The dispute was officially "resolved" in 2019 when President Ahmad Tejan Kabbah announced that "Conakry has now affirmed that Yenga is a part of Sierra Leone". However, in early 2021, President Julius Maada Bio reported to the 58th Ecowas summit that "The issue remains unresolved and our Guinean counterparts have continued to encroach on Sierra Leone's land and sea borders".
