= Guinea–Sierra Leone border =

International border

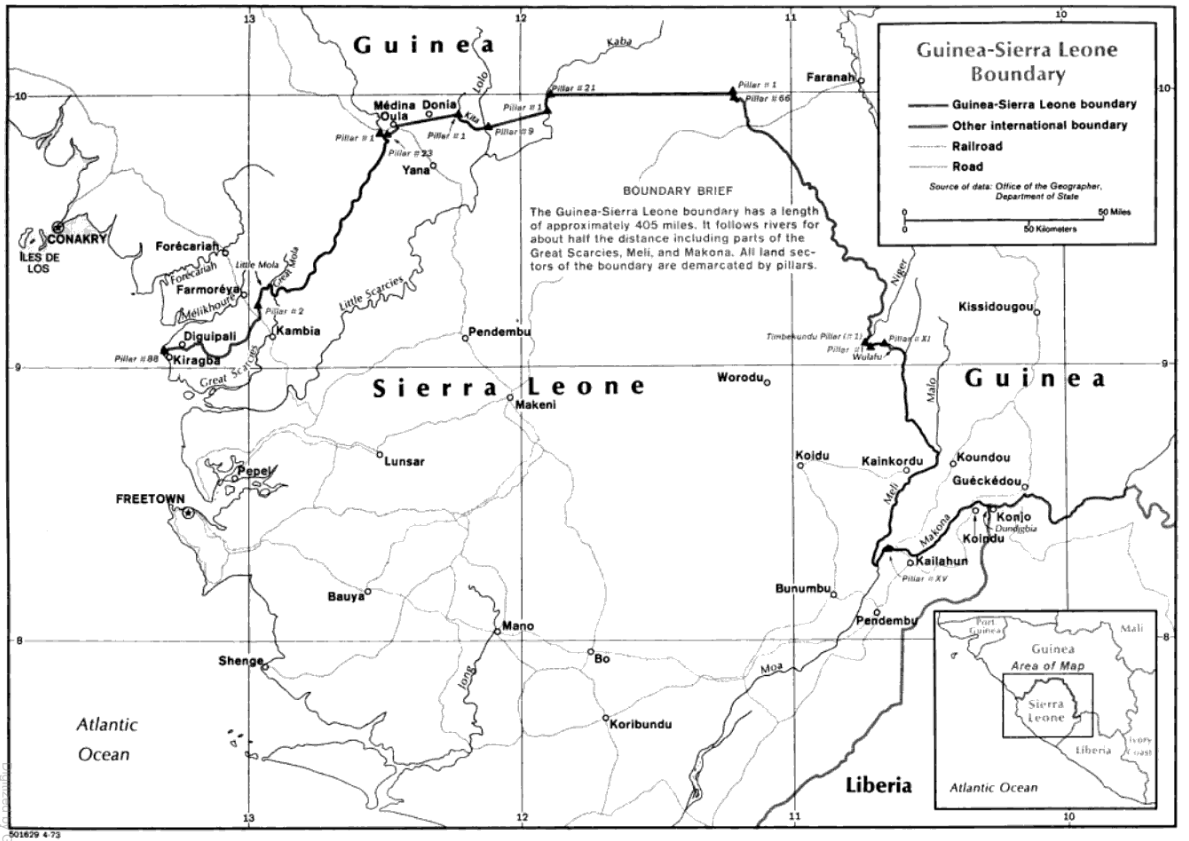
Map of the Guinea-Sierra Leone border

The Guinea–Sierra Leone border is 794 km or 493 mi in length and runs from the Atlantic Ocean in the west to the tripoint with Liberia in the east.

== Description ==
The border starts in the west at the Atlantic coast, and then proceeds overland in a north-easterly direction via various irregular and some straight lines, as well as the Great Scarcies River, before reaching the 10th parallel north. The boundary then follows this parallel eastwards for circa 75 km/47 mi, before proceeding in a south-westerly direction, cutting across the Loma and Tingi Mountains, down to the Meli river. The border follows the Meli down to the confluence with the Moa/Makona, and then follows the Makona eastwards to the Liberian tripoint.

== History ==
Sierra Leone was founded by the British in the 1780s as haven for rescued and freed slaves; the area around Freetown was made a crown colony in 1808 and British rule gradually extended over the interior over the following decades. France had also taken an interest in the West African coast, settling in the region of modern Senegal in the 17th century and later annexing the coast of what is now Guinea in the late 19th century as the Rivières du Sud colony. The area was renamed French Guinea 1893, and was later included within the French West Africa colony.

The 1880s saw an intense competition between the European powers for territories in Africa, a process known as the Scramble for Africa. The process culminated in the Berlin Conference of 1884, in which the European nations concerned agreed upon their respective territorial claims and the rules of engagements going forward. As a result, France and Britain signed a treaty on 28 June 1882 delimiting a boundary between Sierra Leone and Guinea, terminating inland at an undetermined point; another treaty of 10 August 1889 extended the boundary further to the east. This boundary was extended again by a treaty of 21 January 1895 down to the vicinity of Timbekundu, and was then demarcated on the ground from December 1895-May 1896; this demarcation was approved by an exchange of notes in June 1898. Meanwhile, the French Guinea–Liberia border was modified in September 1907–11, as was the Liberia–Sierra Leone border in January 1911, thereby extending the French Guinea-Sierra Leone boundary further south. Britain and France confirmed the new French-Guinea-Sierra Leone boundary line in June 1911 and signed a treaty to this effect on 4 September 1913.

French Guinea gained independence in 1958, followed by Sierra Leone in 1961, and the boundary then became one between two sovereign states. During the Sierra Leone Civil War (1991-2001) some trouble occurred at the border town of Yenga, prompting Guinea to cross the border and occupy the town. The dispute was settled in 2013 and the town returned to Sierra Leonean control.

== Settlements near the border ==
=== Guinea ===
- Pamela
- Farmoriah
- Degui
- Moungata
- Koundou

=== Sierra Leone ===
- Kambia
- Bramaia
- Kukuna
- Koliba
- Gberia Fotombu
- Bendugu
- Faragbema
- Saiama
- Kainkordu
- Dia
- Yenga
