= Kai Londo =

Kissi warrior

Personal details
- Born: May 18, 1845 Komalu, Luawa, British Sierra Leone
- Died: October 10, 1896 (aged 51) Kailahun, British Sierra Leone
- Profession: Warrior, tribal leader

Kai Londo (1845–1896) was a Kissi warrior from Sierra Leone who conquered a large territory (now Kailahun District). He built new roads and fortified towns and established a new capital at Kailahun.

== Biography ==
=== Early life ===
Kai Londo was born in 1845 in the village of Luawa in what is now part of Kailahun District in the Eastern Province of Sierra Leone to parents from the Kissi ethnic group. Londo hailed from a political dominant family; his father was a powerful Kissi chief in eastern Sierra Leone. From boyhood Londo was trained in the art of warfare.

=== Career ===
In 1875, Kai Londo joined the famous Mende warrior, Ndawa, in a series of military campaigns against Chief Benya of Small Bo. Later the two had a falling out and Kai lead a successful attack against Ndawa. Londo was then declared to be the supreme ruler of Luawa. As leader he built new roads, fortified towns, and established the new capital at Kailahun.

=== Death ===
Kai Londo died of a sudden illness in 1896, soon after a military victory.
