= Nyarroh =

- Chief of Barri Chiefdom (in present-day Pujehun District, Sierra Leone)
- Reign: c. 1880s-1914
- Predecessor: Kahjay, her husband
- Successor: her daughter
- Died: 1914

Nyarroh (alternatively referred to as Nyaloh, Nyarroh of Bandasuma or Queen Nyarroh; died 1914) was a Mende chief in Bandasuma, in present-day Sierra Leone, from at least the 1880s onward. Little is recorded about Nyarroh prior to the 1880s; however, British reports in the 1880s consider her one of the main chiefs in the area with control over important roads from the coast to inland areas. Nyarroh's position at a critical juncture led her to host many negotiations between British officers and the Mende chiefs in the interior of the country. Like many of the other Mende chiefs, she took an active role in warfare and in 1887 she was taken captive and held for many months. She signed a friendship agreement with the British in 1890 and became part of their administration of the colony until her death in 1914.

== Chieftainship ==
Nyarroh was the chief of the town of Bandasuma (modern Bandajuma) and gained other land to become the chief of the entire Barrie region on the Moa River in the present-day country of Sierra Leone. Not much is recorded about Nyarroh's life prior to 1885 when she became a key mediator in British efforts in the interior of Sierra Leone.

Oral histories say that Nyarroh became the chief of Bandasuma after the death of her husband Kahjay who was the chief of the village. She expanded her control over a greater land area and became the chief of the entire Barrie region. Most of the addition was the result of a gift from Boakie Gomna the Tunkia chief who had become her Nyarroh's lover after the death of her husband. A separate oral tradition contends that she at one point controlled land on the East side of the Moa River (the land around modern wildlife sanctuary of Tiwai Island), but that that land was gifted to another chief who became her lover as well.

The Barrie region controlled by Nyarroh was bordered by the Tunkia chiefdom to the north and the Moa river to the West. The area gained significance with British efforts to bring the interior Mende country into its colonial government because it was at a key crossroads leading from the coastal towns to the important Mende chiefs in the far interior.

Although in official British reports she was referred to as Queen Nyarroh, this is likely due to indiscriminate usage of the title by British officers when dealing with indigenous authorities, and she was a chief under the power of Mendengla, one of the four primary Mende kings. Her authority is contested by different historians with Arthur Abraham claiming that Nyarroh saw increased power largely to serve British colonial efforts and she had limited power prior to British colonial involvement. In contrast, Lynda R. Day argues that Nyarroh was able to play a unique role as a mediator between British and indigenous interests because women had a traditional role as mediators in Mende society.

== Mediator ==
Nyarroh became important in British reports as a key mediating force in negotiations between the British, the coastal chiefs, and the chiefs in the interior during the 1880s and 1890s.

Her first recorded involvement was with Nyarroh as the key chief mediating the fighting over control of the Massaquoi kingdom, which was a key location on the Moa river in between the coastal chiefs and the interior chiefs. Two chiefs were trying to gain control over the kingdom with Boakie Gomna supported by the inland chiefs, including Jabati, Nyarroh and Mendengla. Fawundu, in contrast, was supported by the coastal chieftains such as Momo Kai Kai and others. Most of the coastal chieftains were under British treaties of protection and so when these communities began being attacked during the struggle the British sent officers to the inland chiefs to negotiate an end to the violence. The mission entered Bandasuma where they reported that Nyarroh spoke English quite well and that she was willing to organize a meeting between Samuel Rowe, the British governor of the territory, and many of the chiefs of the interior. Nyarroh cleared the roads for Rowe's arrival and hosted the meetings in Bandasuma for two weeks. Since Mendengla was not in attendance, she arranged to have messengers keeping him in contact throughout the meeting. Rowe convinced many of the chiefs of the interior to sign peace agreements with the coastal chiefs. Mendengla did not sign the agreement but did not prevent its signature by the chiefs in the area either.

Following this peace agreement though, Kubah, a war chief (a mercenary who controlled his own troops and aligned with different leaders) who had been one of the primary participants in the conflict over the Massaquoi kingdom became upset because of the decreased opportunities for raiding that this would offer him. Perceived as a threat to her rule, Nyarroh killed Kubah in November 1885 in Bandasuma. Another war chief, Ndawa, had been a key ally of Kubah (brother in some reports) and so began a series of campaigns against Nyarroh to avenge Kubah's death. On 11 April 1887, Ndawa succeeded by sacking Bandasuma and taking Nyarroh hostage. The British took an active role in trying to negotiate her release from Ndawa but Ndawa refused most of the gestures. Information about her release are not recorded but she was released and returned as the Barri chief by 1888. In the years which followed, Bandasuma became a key neutral site for meetings between the British and the inland chiefs under Mendengla. This was followed with an 1893 meeting hosted by Nyarroh between the British governor of the territory, now Francis Fleming, and all the chiefs of the interior, including Mendengla.

These meetings yielded gradually increased British prominence in the region. In 1890, she signed a treaty of friendship with the British and as a result was provided a British government stipend as chief of the region. She remained chief under British rule until her death in 1914. Her daughter followed her as chief but the importance of Bandasuma decreased significantly in the early 20th century.

== See also ==
- British–Creole intervention in the Sierra Leone hinterland, 19th century
- Joos Maternal Dynasty
