= Environmental issues in Sierra Leone =

Environmental issues in Sierra Leone are partly related to local human activities, including deforestation, soil degradation, overfishing and water pollution. Deforestation is mainly caused by commercial timber, agricultural uses and fuel demand, which leads to soil erosion and loss of wildlife habitats. Improper agricultural practices reduce soil fertility and deteriorate soil quality. Overfishing has led to a decline in fish stocks, affecting the local food supply and employment of residents. In addition, drought in the region has increased health risks for the population. The Government of Sierra Leone and several organizations are currently addressing these environmental problems through ecological conservation and sustainable development programs.

== Biodiversity ==
Sierra Leone is home to four terrestrial ecoregions: Guinean montane forests, Western Guinean lowland forests, Guinean forest-savanna mosaic, and Guinean mangroves.

Human activities claimed to be responsible or contributing to land degradation in Sierra Leone include unsustainable agricultural land use, poor soil and water management practices, deforestation, removal of natural vegetation, fuelwood consumption and to a lesser extent overgrazing and urbanization.

Deforestation, both for commercial timber and to make room for agriculture, is a major concern and represents an enormous loss of natural economic wealth for the country. Mining and slash and burn for land conversion – such as cattle grazing – dramatically diminished forested land in Sierra Leone since the 1980s. It is listed among countries of concern for emissions, as having Low Forest Cover with High Rates of Deforestation (LFHD). There are concerns that heavy logging continues in the Tama-Tonkoli Forest Reserve in the north. Loggers have extended their operations to Nimini, Kono District, Eastern Province; Jui, Western Rural District, Western Area; Loma Mountains National Park, Koinadougu, Northern Province; and with plans to start operations in the Kambui Forest reserve in the Kenema District, Eastern Province. The country had a 2019 Forest Landscape Integrity Index mean score of 2.76/10, ranking it 154th globally out of 172 countries. More trees were cut after the war in order for Leoneans to rebuild. However, this has led to a significant decline in natural resources.

Habitat degradation for the African wild dog, Lycaon pictus, has increased, such that this canid is deemed to have been extirpated in Sierra Leone.

Until 2002, Sierra Leone lacked a forest management system because of the civil war that caused tens of thousands of deaths. Deforestation rates have increased by 7.3% since the end of the civil war. On paper, 55 protected areas covered 4.5% of Sierra Leone as of 2003. This has led to a decline in the nation's abundant natural wealth. The country has 2,090 known species of higher plants, 147 mammals, 626 birds, 67 reptiles, 35 amphibians, and 99 fish species. Unrestricted hunting during the war led to the decrease of many animal populations, including elephants, lions, and buffalo. Many of these animals can now only be found in sanctuaries. The tsetse fly is now dominant in the region and has led to an increase in the spread of the disease sleeping sickness. Still, Sierra Leone's bird populations have been largely the same and includes native birds such as cuckoos, owls, and vultures. The Tiwai Island Wildlife Sanctuary and the Gola Forest Reserves are just two examples of the humanitarian efforts to preserve wildlife after the civil war.

Droughts shock in the area have led to severe malnourishment and lower birth weights in newborns. Leading to sickliness in the children as they grow.

The Environmental Justice Foundation has documented how the number of illegal fishing vessels in Sierra Leone's waters has multiplied in recent years. The amount of illegal fishing has significantly depleted fish stocks, depriving local fishing communities of an important resource for survival. The situation is particularly serious as fishing provides the only source of income for many communities in a country still recovering from over a decade of civil war.

Sierra Leone is particularly vulnerable to coastal erosion; according to the International Displacement Monitoring Center, more than 2 million people are threatened by rising sea levels. Salty ocean water often forces farmers to move further inland, leading to further deforestation and coastal erosion.

== Environmental progress ==
Despite numerous setbacks, Sierra Leone has steady made progress in reversing climate change.

In June 2005, the Royal Society for the Protection of Birds (RSPB) and Bird Life International agreed to support a conservation-sustainable development project in the Gola Forest in southeastern Sierra Leone, an important surviving fragment of rainforest in Sierra Leone.

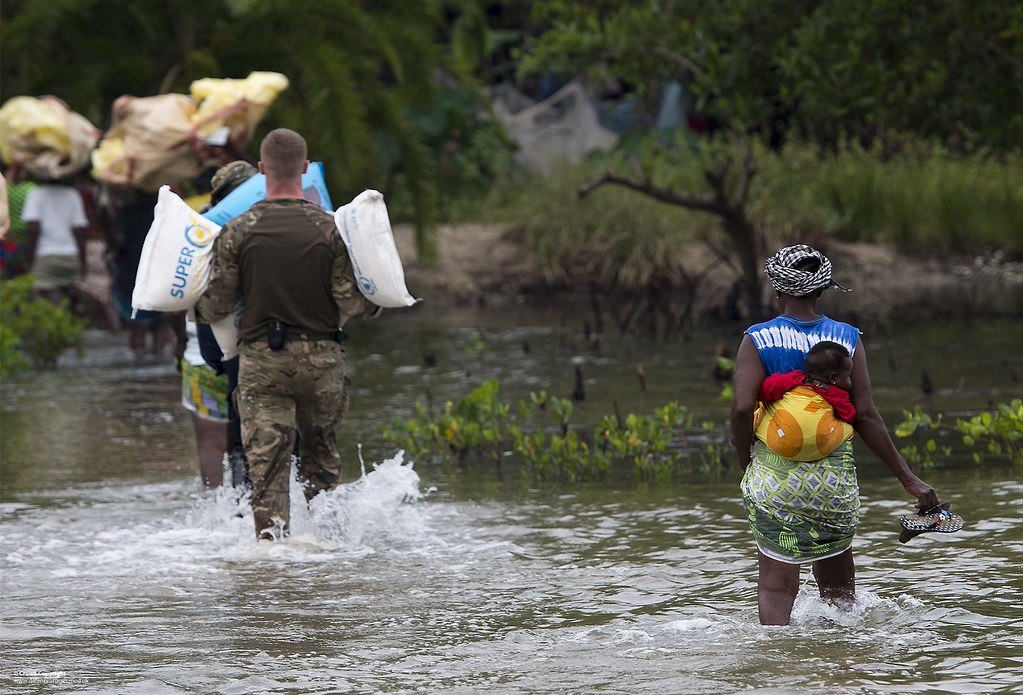
Humanitarian efforts are helping rebuild after a flood. A woman carries a baby on her back and walks in the sludge.

In 2015 the United Nations adopted the Sustainable Development Goals (SDGs) agenda. Its goal is to end world hunger and poverty. It also strives to limit carbon emissions and reverse climate change. This adaptation has been locally encouraged through commodity farming associations. USAID (United States Agency for International Development) also is assisting countries in the climate crisis.

Sierra Leone has taken action to provide new legislation for climate change since 2019. A $74 million International Development Association (IDA) grant (as well as investments) was given to support Sierra Leone in combatting climate change.

Teaching legislature has also played a part in sustainability effort. The National Assembly has embraced sustainability in recent years and has welcomed help from Addis Ababa, Ethiopia to facilitate environmental training.

Advanced technology has been developed to detect upcoming landslides. A research study was completed by the University of Electronic Science and Technology of China. They concluded the Small BAseline Subset Interferometric Synthetic Aperture Radar SBAS-InSAR has been proven to be the most accurate method of predicting landslides in the region.

== Renewable energy ==
Approximately 1.2 billion people worldwide lack electricity, a sizable portion of whom live in Sub-Saharan Africa. This is largely due to frequent poverty and war, which have stunned economic growth, health, and proper education goals.

During the Ebola Virus and COVID-19, mining (a significant source of wealth for the country) declined, and reliance on global trade increased. The government of Sierra Leone and independent power producers (IPP) have provided financial assistance to Sierra Leone with their energy production and to improve health and education. They hope to increase Sierra Leone's supply and demand for inexpensive renewable or sustainable energy.

Commodity associations are advancing climate change adaptation through encouraging farm workers to implement environmentally friendly practices and agriculture technology. Young workers were more likely to have advanced technology assisting in farming activities.

== Tree cover extent and loss ==
Global Forest Watch publishes annual estimates of tree cover loss and 2000 tree cover extent derived from time-series analysis of Landsat satellite imagery in the Global Forest Change dataset. In this framework, tree cover refers to vegetation taller than 5 m (including natural forests and tree plantations), and tree cover loss is defined as the complete removal of tree cover canopy for a given year, regardless of cause.

For Sierra Leone, country statistics report cumulative tree cover loss of 2,171,468 ha (21,714.68 km^{2}) from 2001 to 2024 (about 38.7% of its 2000 tree cover area). For tree cover density greater than 30%, country statistics report a 2000 tree cover extent of 5,617,880 ha (56,178.8 km^{2}). The charts and table below display this data. In simple terms, the annual loss number is the area where tree cover disappeared in that year, and the extent number shows what remains of the 2000 tree cover baseline after subtracting cumulative loss. Forest regrowth is not included in the dataset.

Annual tree cover loss in Sierra Leone, 2001–2024. View chart definition.
Tree cover extent in 2000 minus cumulative tree cover loss in Sierra Leone, 2001–2024 (loss-only residual; does not account for gain). View chart definition.

Annual tree cover extent and loss
Year	Tree cover extent (km2) (Note: This residual measure does not include forest regrowth.)	Annual tree cover loss (km2)
2001	55,992.84	185.96
2002	55,839.74	153.10
2003	55,748.75	90.99
2004	55,708.54	40.21
2005	55,639.81	68.73
2006	55,354.55	285.26
2007	55,135.77	218.78
2008	54,926.52	209.25
2009	54,621.06	305.46
2010	54,533.24	87.82
2011	54,193.94	339.30
2012	54,030.38	163.56
2013	52,327.61	1,702.77
2014	50,712.48	1,615.13
2015	48,384.86	2,327.62
2016	46,607.99	1,776.87
2017	44,280.47	2,327.52
2018	42,398.30	1,882.17
2019	40,643.63	1,754.67
2020	39,097.23	1,546.40
2021	37,966.92	1,130.31
2022	36,767.63	1,199.29
2023	35,770.81	996.82
2024	34,464.12	1,306.69
