= Jusu Sawie =

Sierra Leonean politician

Member of the Sierra Leone Parliament for Kailahun District
- Incumbent
- Assumed office 2002

Personal details
- Party: Sierra Leone People's Party

Jusu Q. B. Sawi is a Sierra Leonean politician from the opposition Sierra Leone People's Party (SLPP) who as of 2007 was a member of Parliament of Sierra Leone representing Kailahun District. Sawi first ran for a seat in parliament in the 2002 general election, in which he won by a large margin. He won re-election in the 2007 general election, although the SLPP lost the majority of seats in parliament to the then opposition All People's Congress (APC). Jusu Sawi is a member of the Mende ethnic group from Kailahun District.
