= Teaching =

Process or activity of imparting knowledge and skills

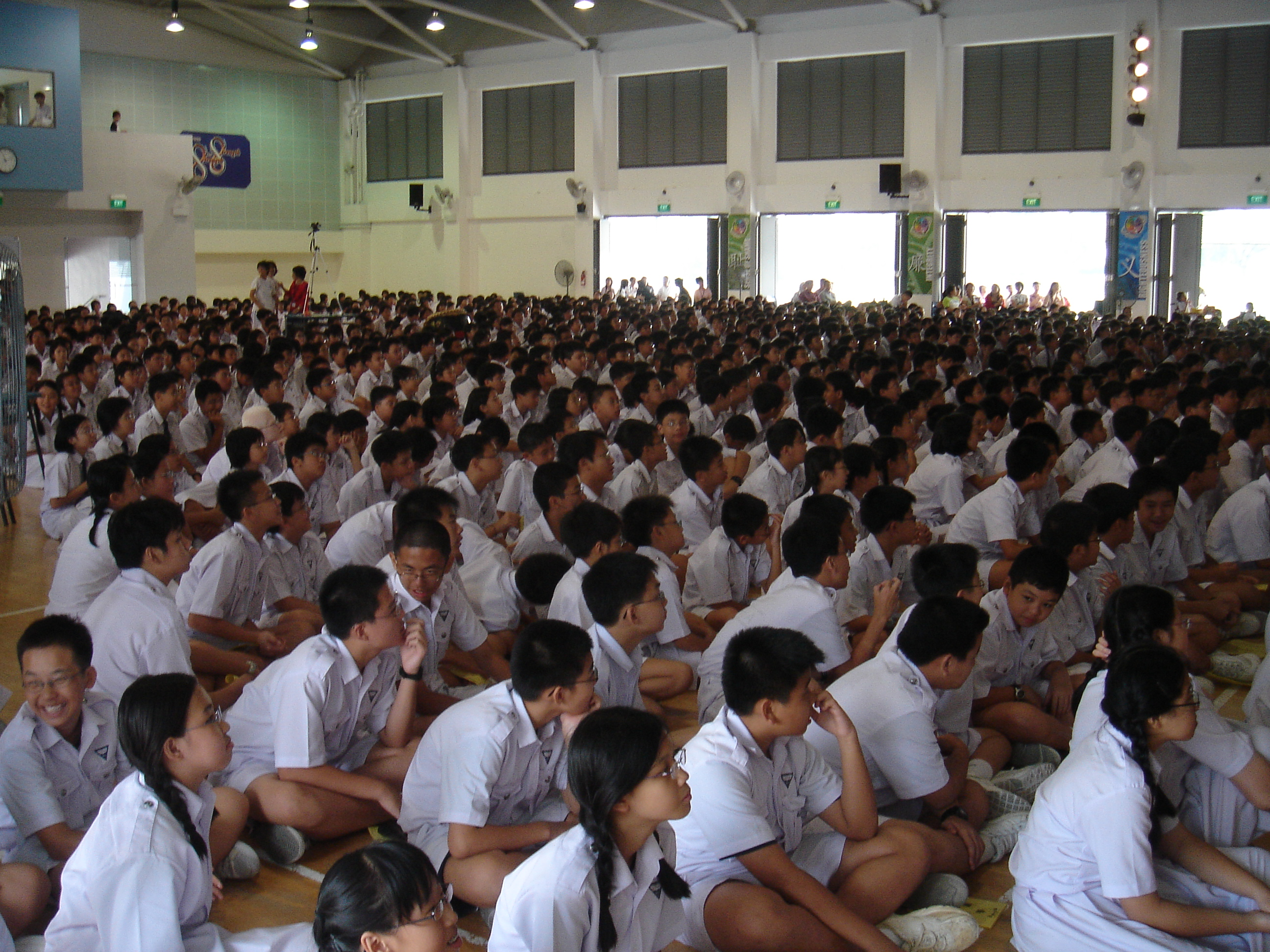
Schoolers gathered from the Nan Hua High School in Singapore

Teaching is the practice implemented by a teacher aimed at transmitting skills (knowledge, know-how, and interpersonal skills) to a learner, a student, or any other audience of an educational institution. Teaching is closely related to learning, the student's activity of appropriating this knowledge.

Teaching is part of the broader concept of education.

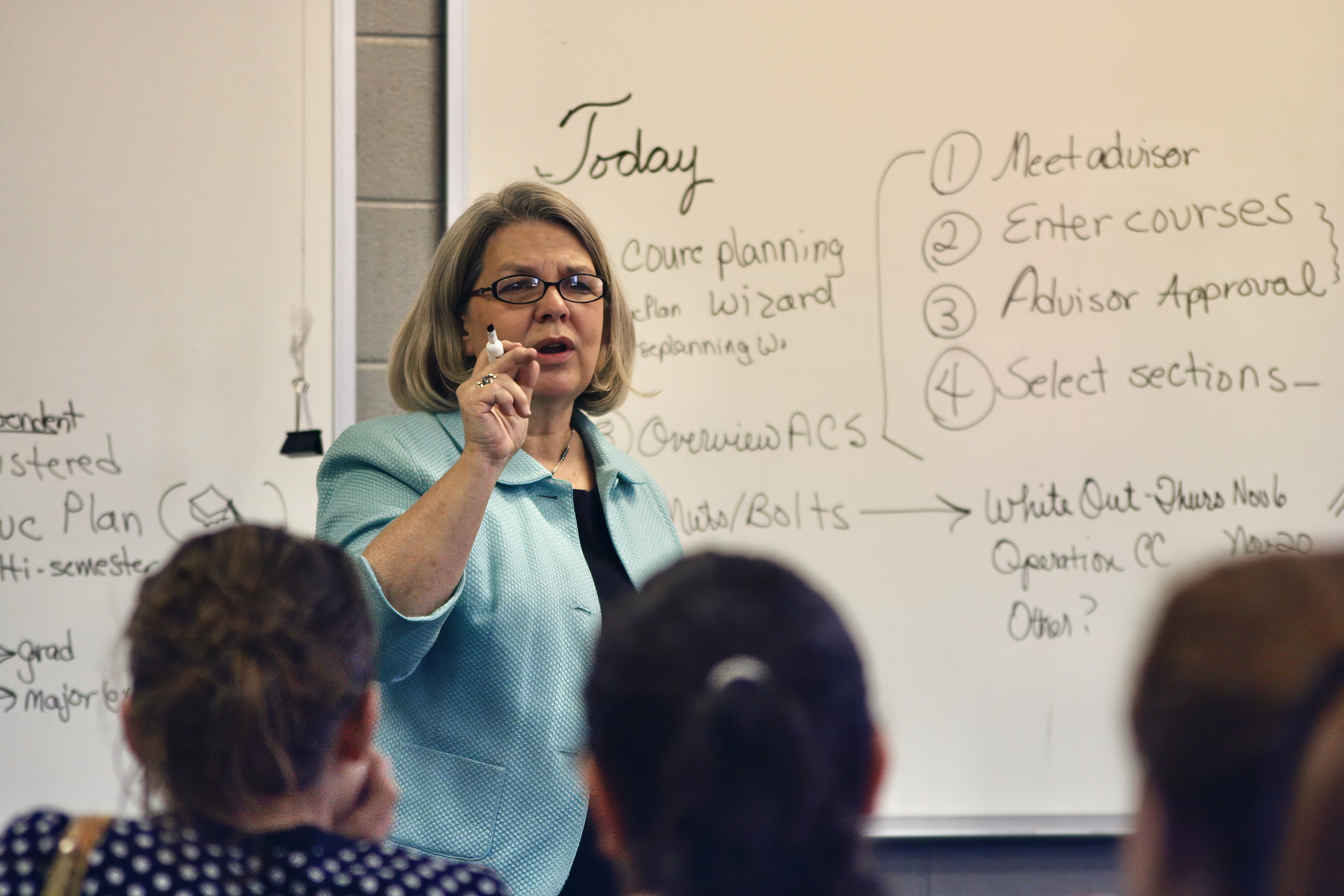
A college professor teaching a class in the United States

== Profession ==
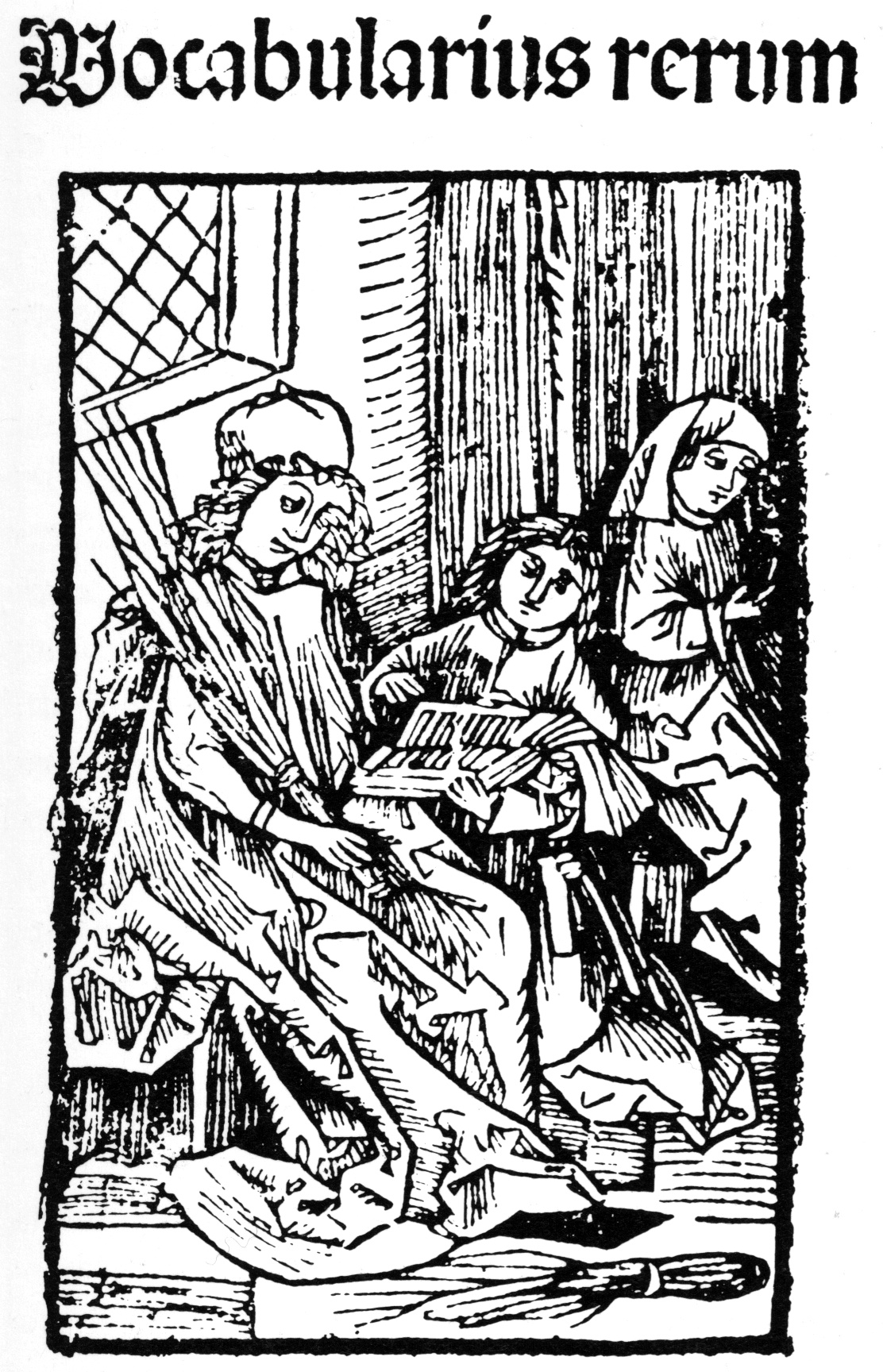
A teacher of a Latin school and two students, 1487

A teacher, also called a schoolteacher or formally an educator, is a person who helps students to acquire knowledge, competence, or virtue, via the practice of teaching.

Informally the role of teacher may be taken on by anyone (e.g. when showing a colleague how to perform a specific task). In some countries, teaching young people of school age may be carried out in an informal setting, such as within the family (homeschooling), rather than in a formal setting such as a school or college. Some other professions may involve a significant amount of teaching (e.g. youth worker, pastor).

In most countries, formal teaching of students is usually carried out by paid professional teachers. This article focuses on those who are employed, as their main role, to teach others in a formal education context, such as at a school or other place of initial formal education or training.

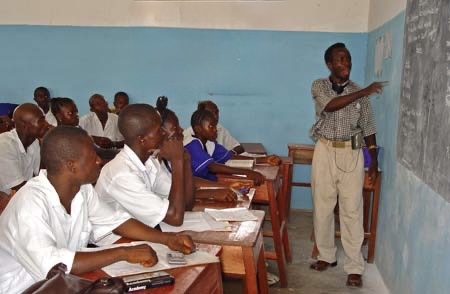
A teacher in a classroom at a secondary school in Pendembu, Sierra Leone

== Training ==
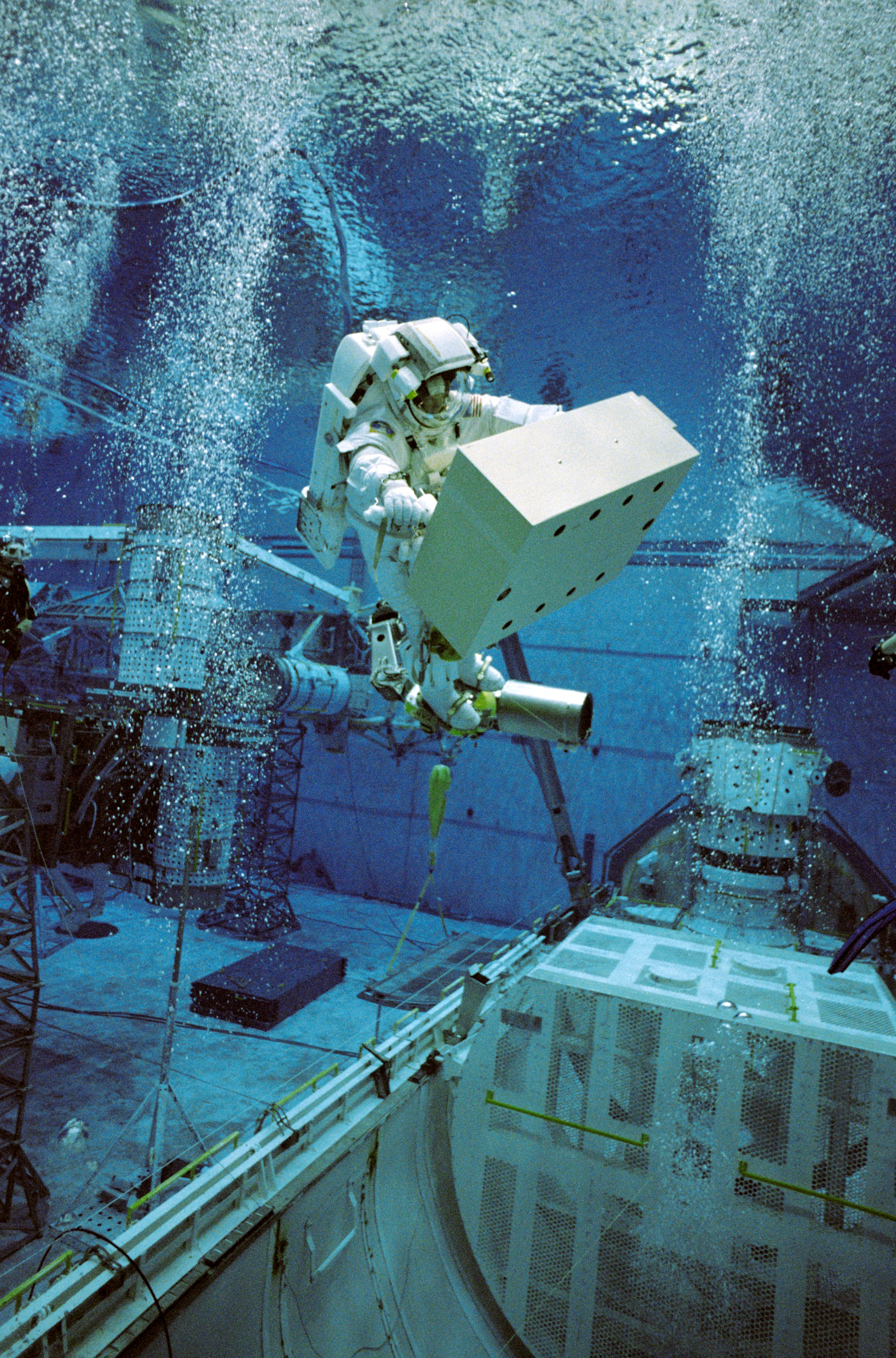
An astronaut in training for an extravehicular activity mission using an underwater simulation environment on Earth.

Training is teaching, or developing in oneself or others, any skills and knowledge or fitness that relate to specific useful competencies. Training has specific goals of improving one's capability, capacity, productivity and performance. It forms the core of apprenticeships and provides the backbone of content at institutes of technology (also known as technical colleges or polytechnics). In addition to the basic training required for a trade, occupation or profession, training may continue beyond initial competence to maintain, upgrade and update skills throughout working life. People within some professions and occupations may refer to this sort of training as professional development. Training also refers to the development of physical fitness related to a specific competence, such as sport, martial arts, military applications and some other occupations. Training methods of all types can be improved by setting specific, time-based, and difficult goals. This allows for the progressive mastery of a topic with a measured outcome.

== Psychology of teaching ==
In psychology, teaching is often defined as a behavior defined by the intent of the teacher. If an individual has the intent to help others to learn, then the following behavior is teaching. This definition was coined as "mentalistic", because it suppose that we have information about the teacher's mental state.

Teaching behavior remains understudied in psychology and cognitive science. Hence, cognitive underpinnings of teaching are still poorly known. The ability to mentalize (that is to say, represent states of other individuals) or the use theory of mind is often suggested as crucial for teaching, even though this link lacks practical evaluation.

=== Development of teaching abilities ===
Children show teaching abilities from a young age. As young as twelve months old, children are able to spontaneously help adults to find an object when the adult express their ignorance about the object location. Children are also able to select relevant evidence when they teach. At four year old, they already transmit preferably true information rather than false information. Children also show the ability to adapt to the learner and infer which piece of information is usefull given learner's mistakes.

== Teaching in non-human animals ==
Teaching has been considered uniquely human because of mentalistic definitions. Indeed, in psychology, teaching is defined by the intention of the teacher to transmit information, behavior, and/or skill. This implies the need for the teacher to assess the knowledge state of the potential learner, thus to demonstrate theory of mind abilities. As theory of mind and intentions are difficult (if not impossible) to assess in non-humans, teaching was considered uniquely human. However, if teaching is defined by its function, it is then possible to assess its presence among non-human species. Caro and Hauser suggested a functionalist definition. For a behavior to be labeled as teaching, three criteria must be met :

- The behavior of the "teacher" must be observed only in the presence of a naive individual
- The behavior represents a cost to the teacher, or at least no direct benefit
- The possible consequence of the behavior is a learning gain for the learner

== See also ==
- Teaching method
