= Hindowa Momoh =

Sierra Leonean politician

Hindowa Batilo Momoh (born in Kailahun) is a Sierra Leonean former radical youth activist and former President of the National Union of Sierra Leone Students. Hindowa was born and brought up in Kailahun, Kailahun District, in the Eastern Province of Sierra Leone. Hindowa received his Ph.D. in African Studies from Howard University in 2004. He was a member of the National Electoral Commission in the recent general election held on August 11, and September 17, 2007.
