= Robin Faley =

Member of Parliament of Sierra Leone from Kailahun District
- In office 2007–present

Personal details
- Born: March 21, 1965 (age 61) Segbwema, Kailahun District, Sierra Leone
- Party: All People's Congress (APC)

Robin Edward Samai Faley (born March 21, 1965) is a Sierra Leonean politician and an outgoing member of Parliament of Sierra Leone from Kailahun District, representing Constituency 7, which is made up of the town of Segbwema and its surrounding areas. He is a member of the All People's Congress (APC); and a former member of the Sierra Leone People's Party (SLPP)

He was elected to the Sierra Leone House of Parliament as a member of the Sierra Leone People's Party (SLPP) from 2007 until he officially announced his defection to the ruling All People's Congress (APC) on September 27, 2012 in his hometown of Segbwema.

Faley was the APC nominee for Parliament in Constituency 7 in Kailahun District in the 2012 Sierra Leone Parliamentary election. He had received the endorsement of Sierra Leone President and APC leader, Ernest Bai Koroma, and the two have campaigned together in Segbwema. Despite being endorsed by President Koroma, Faley lost his re-election bid in a landslide to the main opposition SLPP candidate Abu Jajua who received 77.78%, to Faley's 21.44%.
