= Tiwai Island =

- IUCN category IV (habitat/species management area)
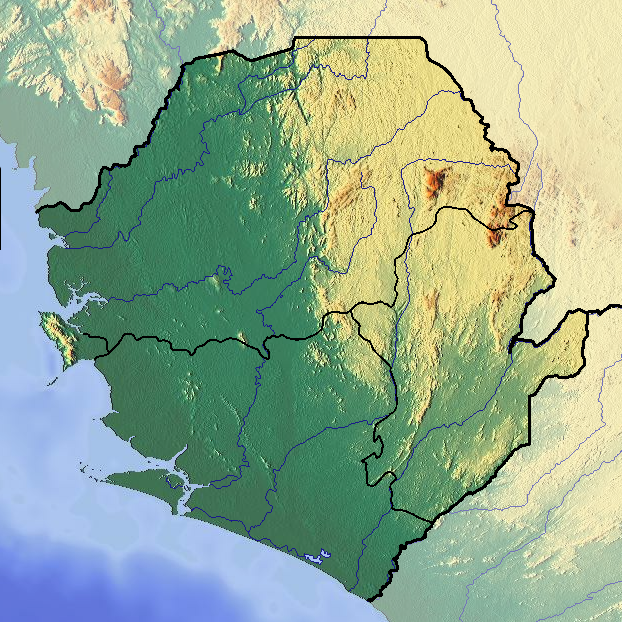
- Location within Sierra Leone
- Location: Pujehun District, Southern Province Sierra Leone
- Nearest city: Kenema
- Coordinates: 7.54413°N 11.34878°W
- Area: 1,200 ha (3,000 acres)
- Established: 1 January 1987
- Governing body: Environmental Foundation for Africa

UNESCO World Heritage Site
- Part of: Gola-Tiwai Complex
- Criteria: Natural: ix, x
- Reference: 1746-001
- Inscription: 2025 (47th Session)

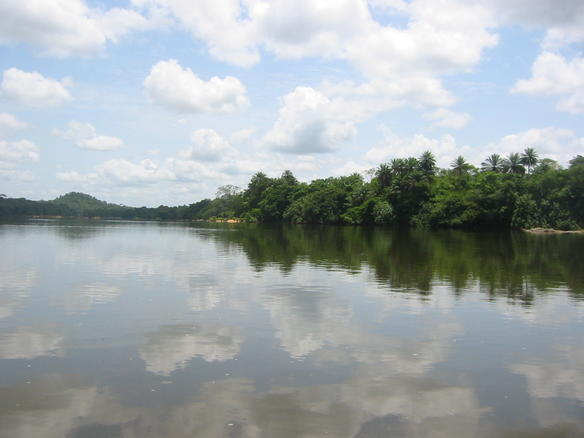
Tiwai Island River

Tiwai Island (Mende for 'Big Island') is a wildlife sanctuary and tourist site in Sierra Leone. Run by the non-governmental organization Environmental Foundation for Africa, Tiwai is 12 square kilometers in area and located on the Moa River in the Pujehun District of the Southern Province. It is also one of the largest inland islands in the country.

== History ==
Tiwai belonged to the Barri people until the late 19th century when the Barri Chief, Queen Nyarroh, gave half the Island to the Koya Chief whose territory was on the opposite side of the Moa River where the Island is located. From then on, both peoples have shared ownership of the Island.

In the late 1970s the Island was recognised as a special biosphere for wildlife conservation. Numerous natural scientists visited the island during the 1970s and 1980s, researching various aspects of its flora and fauna. Subsequently, some researchers along with the Barri and Koya people then requested that it became a wildlife sanctuary and in 1987 it was officially designated a game reserve. Activities including community conservation program, ecological research, wildlife management, tourism and forestry management training took place on the Island. Then, in 1991 civil war broke out in Sierra Leone financial support for the Tiwai was stopped and researchers and tourists were unable to reach the Island. After the end of the civil war the Environmental Foundation for Africa, a local Sierra Leonean NGO, rebuilt both tourism and researcher facilities on the island.

In 2025, the island was designated as a World Heritage Site by UNESCO as part of the Gola-Tiwai complex.

== Geography ==
Tiwai Island is located in the Southern Province, 15 km from the town of Potoru on the Moa River 60 km from the Atlantic Ocean. The Island has area of 1,200 hectares (12 km^{2}) and is between 80 and 100 meters above sea level. The climate on the Island is tropical with a rainy season between May and October and a dry season between December and March. The average temperature is 27 °C and rainfall is about 3,000 mm a year.

== Biology ==
The Island is home to a population of pygmy hippopotamus, over 135 different species of birds and "one of the highest concentration and diversity of primates in the world ... 11 species". The eleven primates are:

- Western chimpanzee (Pan troglodytes verus)
- Sooty mangabey (Cercocebus atys)
- Diana monkey (Cercopithecus diana)
- Campbell's mona monkey (Cercopithecus campbelli)
- Lesser spot-nosed monkey (Cercopithecus petaurista)
- Green monkey (Chlorocebus sabaeus)
- Western red colobus (Procolobus badius)
- Western pied colobus or king colobus (Colobus polykomos)
- Olive colobus (Procolobus verus)
- West African potto (Perodicticus potto)
- Demidoff's galago or dwarf bushbaby (Galagoides demidovii)
