= Kissi Teng Chiefdom =

- Chiefdom
- Interactive map of Kissi Teng Chiefdom
- Coordinates: 8°25′00″N 10°20′00″W
- Country: Sierra Leone
- Province: Eastern Province
- District: Kailahun District
- Capital: Kangama

Population (2004)
  - Total: 30,455
- Time zone: UTC+0 (GMT)

Kissi Teng Chiefdom is a chiefdom in Kailahun District of Sierra Leone with a population of 30,455. Its largest town is Koindu, but its headquarters is in Kangama. The major industry in Kissi Teng Chiefdom is farming. The population of Kissi Teng Chiefdom is largely from the Kissi ethnic group.

During the Sierra Leone Civil War the Kissi Teng Chiefdom was one of the major strongholds of the Revolutionary United Front (RUF). The RUF maintained a base in Koindu and a significant presence in Kangama. Kissi Teng was one of the last chiefdoms to be disarmed in January 2002 at the end of the civil war.

The dispute with Guinea over their soldiers remaining within Sierra Leone ten years after the end of the civil war centers around Yenga in Kissi Teng.

Most of the population is part of the Kissi people.
