= Peje Bongre Chiefdom =

Chiefdom in Sierra Leone

Peje Bongre is a chiefdom in Sierra Leone. It is located in Kailahun District, Eastern Province.
