= Steady Bongo =

Sierra Leonean musician and producer (1966–2024)

- Born: Lansana Sheriff; 28 August 1966; Daru, Kailahun District, Sierra Leone
- Died: 7 December 2024 (aged 58) Pujehun District, Sierra Leone
- Genres: Afropop
- Years active: 1991–2024

Lansana Sheriff (28 August 1966 – 7 December 2024), popularly known by his stage name Steady Bongo, was a Sierra Leonean musician and record producer, who was considered to be one of the country's most famous musicians.

== Life and career ==
Lansana Sheriff, better known as Steady Bongo, was born in Daru, a rural town in Kailahun District in Eastern Sierra Leone, to an ethnic Mandingo father and a Mende mother. Steady Bongo grew up in a largely Mende-speaking household in Daru. From an early age, he performed on stage, imitating musicians such as the legendary Big Fayia, Samile, Eric Donaldson, and Prince Nico. He hosted a programme called "Variety Time" at the Sierra Leone Broadcasting Service (SLBS). His first album, Ready Before You Married, was released in 1990 and became an instant success not only in Sierra Leone, but in neighbouring countries as well. His second album, Kormot Bi En Me, released in 1996, received the Best Album Award and had record-breaking sales. The album was the first of Steady Bongo's records to be released on CD in the United States. In 1998, he released Welcome to Democracy Na Salone, followed by Born For Suffer in 1999.

Sheriff was credited for being one of the first musicians to popularise Sierra Leonean music to the outside world. He died in a traffic collision in Pujehun District, Sierra Leone, on 7 December 2024, at the age of 58.

== Discography ==
- Ready Before You Married (1992)
- Kormot Bi En Me (1996)
- Welcome to Democracy Na Salone (1998)
- Born For Suffer (1999)
