= British and Creole intervention in the Sierra Leone hinterland in the 19th century =

Sierra Leone assumed its present large geographical size only in 1896. Prior to that, it was only a small colony encompassing roughly the 30-km-long peninsula on which Freetown is located. Initially, the British and Creoles (Nova Scotian Settlers, Jamaican Maroons, and Liberated Africans in Sierra Leone and their descendants) of the Freetown colony had only a very limited involvement in the affairs of the African kingdoms around them; such as it was, it consisted mostly of trading and missionary activity. Over the course of the 19th century this involvement gradually increased. The colonial government was, in particular, interested in fostering trade as this provided it with its main source of revenue, in the form of customs duties and other taxes. This inevitably drew it into engagement with the African kingdoms, mainly by making treaties with the kingdoms or sending military expeditions against them.

The treaties usually committed an African chief to protect merchants and maintain peaceful relations with his neighbours so that trade would not be disturbed; in return, the British would pay him a gift or annual stipend. The military expeditions were against chiefs who acted detrimentally to the colony's business interests by evicting traders, restricting trade, or warring with neighbours. After the Slave Trade Act 1807 abolishing slavery, the government also began pressing the chiefs, by treaty or force, to refrain from the slave trade. Since the wars between the chiefdoms were mostly slave-procuring wars, or otherwise intimately connected with the slave trade, suppression of the slave trade and promotion of "legitimate" trade in other products were both key to reducing wars between chief.

In addition to commercial and anti-slave-trade motives for the British incursions into the Sierra Leone hinterland, military officers posted to Sierra Leone needed battle victories to enhance their reputations; and British felt culturally superiority and assumed that Europeanising natives was a proper and upright activity.

== List of interventions ==
This article lists some of the interventions into the Sierra Leone hinterland in the 19th century.

Treaties	Military Expeditions
1803-1805. British claim and exercise the right to mediate in a Sherbro-area war.British and Creole intervention in the Sierra Leone hinterland in the 19th century
	1809. Governor Thompson suppresses a Temne rebellion against an employer at Bunce Island. Transported ringleaders to Cape Coast.
	1815 Governor William Maxwell sent an armed force to raid Cape Mesurado, (now in Liberia), seizing ships, merchandise and enslaved Africans from the factories there. The factory owners were sentenced to fourteen years transportation to New South Wales by the Vice admiralty court.
1821. British arrange truce between warring parties on the Futa Jalon trade route who were disrupting the caravans.
1824. Bai Muro cedes a mile-deep strip on the north shore of Port Loko Creek as well as Bunce, Tasso and Tombo islands.
1825. Governor Turner obtains cession of entire coastal area from Kamaranka river to approximately the Bum river, but the Secretary of State in London refuses to ratify it; the treaties are revived in 1879, however.	1825. Governor Turner deposes the Alikali (ruler) of Port Loko using force or a show of force (not clear) and installs Fatima Brima Kamara.
1825. Governor Turner obtains cession of entire coastal area from Kamaranka river to approximately the Bum river, but the Secretary of State in London refuses to ratify it; the treaties are revived in 1879, however.	1826. Turner captures two stockaded towns in the Bum-Kittam area and burns others. Declares blockade on coast as far as Cape Mount.
	1826. Macaulay, acting-governor, sends armed expedition against chief Harry Tucker to punish him for seizing a trader's goods; burns Tucker's town Commenda.
1831. The Alikali, Rokon area, signs a treaty in return for stipends (first instance of this, according to Fyfe), promoising not to make war without first asking the governor to mediate.	c. 1826. Governor Campbell sends troops to fortify and garrison Sherbro Island. After about a year they are withdrawn.
1841. More treaties with Port Loko.	1841. Governor Jeremie sends troops to Robump on the Rokel to help Walter Atkins, a retired clerk, in a quarrel with Marquis Granby.
	1848. Hotham burns factories and blockades Gallinas chiefs for breaking their treaty obligations to oppose slave trade.
1849. Pine forces rival chiefs in Sherbro area to sign a peace treaty.	1848. Pine goes to Sherbro area in a naval ship and destroys a town where a canoe flying the Union Jack had been seized by one of the parties in a local war for supplying the other party.
1849. Anti slave-trade treaties signed with Sherbro chiefs.	1849. British traders at Rio Nunez summon Belgian and French warships and get them to bombard a native town involved in a war over the succession to a chieftaincy.
	1850. Navy burns the most accessible Gallinas towns because a local official, a former slave trader who served as the navy squadron's pilot and interpreter, was murdered. As a result, the coastal chiefs, e.g. Prince Mana, were overthrown by inland people.
1851. A Rio Nunez chief renounces a previous cession to Belgium and treats with Britain, promising them freedom to trade in return for a right to collect customs duties.
1851, 1852. Treaties made with chiefs Northward from Freetown along the coast; they cede to British courts jurisdiction over British subjects in the chiefs' areas.
1852. Sherbro chiefs come to Freetown after the 1852 naval expedition against them (opposite → ) and sign treaties, promising to oppose slave trade. They get stipends and medals.	1852. Sherbro slave-trading chiefs, including Harry Tucker, begin kicking out Colony produce traders. Governor Kennedy sends a naval force to support the produce traders; it burns towns and baracoons.
	1854. British (Hanson) seize two slave canoes in Melakori river area and shoot four people in the fight. The Melakori chiefs meet and demand redress; Bomba Mina Lahai of Maligia announces that all European traders on the Melakori must leave within 10 days. Acting-governor Dougan sends three gunboats up the Melakori. They land 400 troops unopposed at Maligia; Lahai promises to reopen the river and pay compensation to the traders for lost earnings. After five months he has not done so; a gunboat is sent in May to negotiate, and a day later HMS Teaser is sent with 200 troops who partly destroy Maligia; the townspeople fire at them as they reembark. Teaser returns next morning; while the troops are engaged in burning the rest of the town, they are fired upon heavily from the bush. They attempt to return to Teaser in a small boat but it capsizes and they lose 77 killed or prisoner.
	1854. Gunboat goes to Rio Nunez; chief promises without a struggle to forgive a debt owed to him by the acting-governor's brother, who is a trader.
	1857, 1858. French navy bombards chief Caulker's town of Bendu (on the mainland coast East of Shebro Island) and the British seize Caulker and imprison him in Freetown for six months.
	1858. Naval force bombards Kambia on the Great Scarcies (Kolente) river with rockets and burns it down.
	1859. Five hundred troops landed by two gunboats at Kambia. The enemy (Susu) withdraw. The troops install Temne people there and leave. The Susu shortly drive them out again.
1860. Governor McCormack mediates in a Port Loko war of Temne and Bulom against Susu and achieves a treaty.	c. 1859. In the area of Bumpe the Poro bans timber trade as a result of inter-chief quarrels. A timber merchant, Heddle, gets the British to send a gunboat.
1861. McCormack mediates and gets a treaty in the Kambia disputes between Susu and other peoples.
1861. An Imperial act is passed "to allow British subjects who committed offences in the area from the Rio Grande to the Gallinas and 500 miles Eastwards, to be punished by English law." (Fyfe's words.)
1861. Area South East of the Freetown peninsula, from Waterloo, Sierra Leone to the Ribi river is ceded to the colony.
1861. Under threat of French naval attacks, chief Caulker chooses to cede Bendu and 200 square miles (600 km^{2}) around it to the British. The chiefs of the Bagru area are also convinced to cede their lands to the British. Sherbro and Turtle Islands are similarly ceded.	1861. Governor Hill uses troops and gunboat to threaten a Temne chief, Bai Kanta, into relinquishing land near the colony. Verbally Bai Kanta was told that he was leasing the land for £100 per year but the papers he was given to put his mark to declared it ceded to the British Crown.
	1861. Navy burns several towns near the colony to punish Pa Keni, their chief, for raiding another chief, Songo.
	1861. Three hundred British troops accompanied by Songo and a Mende chief, Gbaya, with several hundred of his own men besiege a Temne stockade at Madonika (North East of Waterloo at the base of the Freetown peninsula) and burn several other Tewmne towns.
	1861. Navy burns towns on the South bank of the Rokel, including several Temne towns and the Muslim town of Foredugu (38 mi – 60 km – upriver from the Atlantic).
	1861. Naval ship goes up the Ribi; unopposed; burns some towns; is fired at from the banks while leaving.
1862. Quiah (Koya) country near Ribi River ceded to colony.	c. 1862. Captain Walshe and troops intervene in a war between a Charles Turner-Mende alliance of at least 3000 warriors, and a Muslim, Kalifa, resident at Bama in the Jong River area.
1862, February. As conditions of peace Bai Kanta is forced to leave the environs of the colony and cede his towns Robana and Robaga (South of the Freetown estuary) to the British.	c. 1862. Walshe arrests several people on both sides of an inter-chiefdom dispute on Sherbro Island and sends them to jail in Freetown.
	1875. British launch small unsuccessful punitive expedition against Mende for raiding Bagru river area towns that were ceded in 1861.
	1875. Acting-governor Rowe leads military expedition up Mongeri (Mongray) Creek (mouth of the Jong); flogs townspeople for being slow to display submission.
	1875. Sherbro Commandant Darnell Davis unsuccessfully attacks chief John Caulker in retaliation to raids in Bagru country.
1876. Acting-governor Rowe obtains treaties from Mende and Sherbro chiefs at Senehun and Shenge following his 1875 military expedition in the area. Terms: De-militarise country by removing stockades from towns.; Local disputes should be referred to British arbitration.; Keep roads open.; Customs duty to be charged by British.; If chiefs cause disturbances in the future they forfeit their lands to the British.; Mende mercenaries who raided Keningbo are fined 10,000 bushels of rice.	1875 or 1876. Rowe makes another expedition, up the Bagru and through Kpa-Mende country. Flogs chiefs and destroys towns for complicity in the Caulker raids. He executes Caulker, Kinigbo, and Vana.
1876, June. Rowe gets Scarcies chiefs to cede a quarter-mile wide strip along sea and river so that British can collect customs duty.
Rowe imprisons in Freetown a chief, Songo, for burning some towns in the Ribi-Bumpe vicinity.
1879.The Crown Law Officers in London declare Turner's 1825 treaty to be in force and Rowe stations constables between Freetown peninsula and Sherbro.	1880. Governor Rowe crosses the Ribi with a military expedition to try to quell Masimera-Yoni fighting.
1881. Mende rulers of Bumpe, Lugbu, and Tikongoh sign treaties guaranteeing peace and saying governor can adjudicate their disputes.	1880. Governor Rowe crosses the Ribi with a military expedition to try to quell Masimera-Yoni fighting.
c. 1882. King Jaya of the Gallinas cedes the territory at the mouth of the Moa River.	1882. British man-of-war enters Jong river; fires on natives; soldiers burn down all or part of the town of Mattru.
	c. 1882. Bai Sherbro of Samu occupies village of Kichom near the mouth of the Great Scarcies, against the Bai Sherbro of Mambolo, an office vacant by death. Acting-governor Havelock drives him out with rockets.
1883. Krim country (i.e. between Sherbro and Gallinas) ceded. At this point the entire coast South of Freetown has been annexed.	1883, April. Acting-governor Pinkett takes a large number of police up the Kittam and lower Bum, burning towns and destroying stockades, in retaliation to the robbery of the police payroll boat of £19.8s.1d.
	1883, May, June. Pinkett takes a force of about 200 to the Imperi area (between the mouths of the Bagru and Jong), then proceeds against Kpawoh Jibila (a.k.a. Gpow) of Talia, a town 30 miles East of Sherbro island, alleging that he has caused disturbances. Some of Jibila's smaller towns are destroyed, then his capital, Talia, is obliterated by rockets, field guns, and natives allied with the British. Jibila, however, slips away; he is rumoured to be in Sahun; a demand is sent there for his surrender. The inhabitants fail to produce him so Pinkett leads another expedition up the Bum; Kortumahun is attacked and most of its inhabitants killed in the bombardment and fires. Sahun and Bahol, farther up the Bum than any British force had gone before, were reached, but the expedition failed to capture Jibila.
	1887. Police drive a chief, Makaia, who had raided Sulima, Mano Salija, and Bandasuma away from the area.
	1887. Police and allies defend Shenge (at the mouth of Cockboro Creek) against a major raid. Subsequently, it is reinforced by more police from Freetown, and later a naval cruiser. Police arrest nine ringleaders; William Caulker, Thomas Kugba, and Lahai are hanged; four others deported.
	1887. Yoni Expedition: British colonel Sir Francis de Winton goes to upper Ribi area in retaliation against Yoni warriors for raiding a British client chief, a Mende, Madam Yoko. De Winton's 200 soldiers, 50 police, and naval detachment are joined by 700 native allies. Together they bombard and partly burn Robari, plunder and destroy several other towns, destroy rice fields, and take captives. British imprison Yoni chief Bai Simera, fine the Masimera and Marampa peoples, and deport six leaders to Elmina.
	1888. Chief Boakei Gomna ("Governor") of the Gallinas area is deported by special ordinance to the Gambia. 1891 brought back insane and dies. George Gbapo also slated for deportation and may also have gone.
	1888. Police in Sulima area attempt to arrest Chief Fawundu for allegedly planning war. They shoot six of his people in the fight but Fawundu gets away.
	1888. Captain Robert Copland-Crawford, Sherbro acting-manager, takes 17 police to Sulima area to help Chief Kai Kai versus chief Makaia; they capture the town of Jehoma. Also in the same region, Crawford marches to Bahoma, finds it empty, and burns it.
1889. Governor Hay makes an extensive tour from Kambia in the North to the Mano river in the South, generally travelling about 40 miles (60 km) inland. He obtains from chiefs promises to build roads and refrain from war.	1889. Copland-Crawford, 75 police, Momo Ja with 800 men, and additional disorganised fighters go on expedition against Chief Makaia. They take Fanima, one of his strongholds, on January 2; January 3, seize the six stockaded towns of Lago unopposed. Makaia flees inland to his ally Nyagua of Panguma.
	1889.Police find warriors of chief Gbana Gombu looting a town, flog them, and arrest Gombu. He dies in Freetown jail of police mistreatment.
	1889. In June, Copland-Crawford is convicted by a Sherbro jury of manslaughter for flogging his servant to death. He is sentenced to 12 months in prison but released on medical grounds in England.
c. 1889. Rowe acknowledges Madam Yoko as chief in Senehun (upper Bumpe) area. Fyfe, p 484, lists four other women made or protected as chiefs by the British; he does not say whether the British favoured women as client chiefs. The women were: Nyaro of Bandasuma, Betsy Gay of Bogo, Kona Kambe in the Bagru, and Madam Yata of the Massaquoi territory.	1889. Momo Ja, G.H. Garrett, the officer in charge of the Sulima police, and 12 police destroy the 13 towns of Mende community, in the middle-Bum, upper Wanje region, for obstructing trade. They release 3,000 people being held there and send them to Momo Ja's country.
1889. The governor, Hay, exercises power to confirm a king after his selection by chiefs (in Koya country).	1889. Nyagua gives up Makaia to Garrett's force and Makaia is exiled to Elmina. In 1894 he is allowed back.
1889, 10 August. Britain and France update their 1882 agreement which set a rough boundary between Sierra Leone and Guinea. The boundary is still not exact and is to be refined by a Commission later.	1889. Police stop their recent Mende allies from Taiama and Kwelu from unsanctioned continuation af raiding. One leader is jailed.
	1889. Lieutenant Lundy, 2nd W.I.R., flogs Fula allies of British colonel de Winton for slave trading, destroys their towns, and drives them away from the Rotifunk area.
	1889. Acting-governor Foster makes treaty of alliance with chief of Sobami (50 mi or 80 km inland between the Great and Little Scarcies) against a Susu chief, Karimu, who is becoming powerful in the area. The British burn one of Karimu's towns and Karimu withdraws into French-controlled territory. (That same year there was a French "punitive" expedition against natives at the Scarcies estuary.)
1890, January 1. Secretary of State Knutsford instructs Governor Hay to get treaties of friendship on the British side of the boundary with a clause forbidding the chiefs to make treaties with another European power without British consent.
1890, January. Frontier Police created by Ordinance. 280 members. Blockhouses built at the important towns around the frontier road (about 30 mi or 50 km from Freetown). Force is composed of Creoles and hinterland people under European officers. The force quickly acquires a reputation for brutality and using their position for personal gain.	1890. Garrett arrests Temne chief Bai Bureh for "defiance" when Bureh expresses displeasure at his allies having signed without consulting him a treaty promising not to attack their enemy Karimu. Bureh escapes on the way to Freetown.
1890. Treaty boom begins. Two travelling commissioners go out on treaty-making tours: Garrett in the North, Alldridge in the South. Garrett reaches Samori in 1890 at Bisandu, outside the present boundary. Alldridge reaches Kanrelahun (now called Kailahun) in 1890 and goes to Kisi country in 1891. Hay also went out himself: in 1890 he went first to Sherbro and Sulima districts, then inland to towns no governor had visited before: Mafwe, Tikonko, Bumpe, Jama, Taiama. In March 1891 he went round the Temne country into Kofila and Bonkolenken.
1891. Forty frontier police are sent to the Small Scarcies area to restore prestige after the Bai Bureh escape and also suppress wars. They unsuccessfully attack one of Karimu's towns, Tambi (Tembe), 70 miles (110 km) inland on the river.
	1891. British, this time with 168 police, make a second attempt on Tambi, but are again repulsed.
	1891. A third assault is made on Tambi, by frontier police and 500 soldiers, accompanied by disciplined forces under Bai Bureh. The town is taken "without difficulty."
	1893, December. Three hundred and seventy-nine army regulars, 47 frontier police, and about 1000 carriers from Freetown make an expedition against the Samorian Sofa. They go up the Bum river toward Panguma. Hundreds of additional carriers are impressed from villages along the way, sometimes by arresting their chiefs and flooging them if the carriers do not perform properly. In the early morning darkness of 23 December, at Waima (40 miles or 65 km past Panguma) this force and a small French force under Lieutenant Gaston Maritz mistake each other for the Sofa and engage in a gun battle, each suffering heavy casualties. Maritz and the British police commander are both killed.
1894. Beginning in 1894, "Protectorate" was substituted for "Sphere" in Ordinances.	1893, December 28. Forty frontier police help defend chief Vonjo at Tungea near Panguma against Sofas led by Pokere. Pokere is killed, the Sofas defeated and pursued, engaged and defeated again on January 2. Pokere's ally, Foray, is captured and dies in Freetown jail. British allies continue raiding after the expedition is over; the British jail their leaders.
1895. Boundary agreement made in Paris. It still leaves the exact line subject to a later surveying Commission (which was performed in 1896).	1896, May. In the upper Bagru-Bumpe area, frontier police arrest seven people of Mokassi over a land dispute between that town and Banjema.
	1896. In the Moa river area, frontier police drive away a chief called Bawarume who is threatening a chief they support called Fabunde. A third chief, Kaba Sei, they arrest on the grounds that he has helped Bawarume.

== Protectorate ==
In August 1896, the British declared the entire hinterland area a "Protectorate" and placed it under their administration. In 1898, the Sierra Leone chiefs sought to free themselves of British control in a rebellion called the Hut Tax war. It was the last large armed confrontation between British and Africans in Sierra Leone. The Africans' defeat ushered in the country's modern colonial period, which lasted until political independence in 1961.

== Sources ==
Arthur Abraham, Mende Government and Politics Under Colonial Rule. Freetown, 1978.

Christopher Fyfe, History of Sierra Leone. London, 1962. (Oxford University Press)

Kenneth Little, The Mende of Sierra Leone. London, 1967. (First ed. was 1951.)
