= Daru, Sierra Leone =

Daru
- Location in Sierra Leone
- Coordinates: 07°59′31″N 10°50′26″W
- Country: Sierra Leone
- Province: Eastern Province
- District: Kailahun
- Chiefdom: Jawei

Population
  - Total: 5,958
- 2010
- Time zone: UTC-5 (GMT)

Daru is a town in Kailahun District in the Eastern Province of Sierra Leone with a population of 5,958 (2010 estimate) Daru lies approximately 25 miles (40 kilometres) from Kenema.

Daru is home to one of the largest military barracks in Sierra Leone. The vast majority of the people in the town are from the Mende ethnic group.

== Climate and vegetation ==
The community has a typical monsoon climate type which is the same as the Southeastern region of the country. It experiences longer period of rainy season and high amount of rainfall. The dry season normally starts at November and ends in March whist the rest is considered wet season. This makes the soil of the chiefdom or district very arable and fertile and allows the cultivation of many crops. It has a normal temperature of 26 °C and humility of 92%. Daru lies along the rain forest zone in the country.

The community was once surrounded with thick forests, but this forest has been replaced by palm-trees and farm bush over the years due to farming activities. At present, the community is largely surrounded by palm-tree plantation owned by the Goldtree Plantation Ltd. Swamps and grassland comprised the remaining vegetation of the community.

== Notable people ==
- Steady Bongo (1966–2024), musician and producer

Climate data for Daru (1961–1990)
Month	Jan	Feb	Mar	Apr	May	Jun	Jul	Aug	Sep	Oct	Nov	Dec	Year
Mean daily maximum °C (°F)	31.6 (88.9)	33.9 (93.0)	34.4 (93.9)	33.2 (91.8)	32.2 (90.0)	30.7 (87.3)	29.2 (84.6)	29.0 (84.2)	30.1 (86.2)	30.8 (87.4)	30.7 (87.3)	30.1 (86.2)	31.3 (88.4)
Daily mean °C (°F)	24.8 (76.6)	26.1 (79.0)	27.8 (82.0)	27.5 (81.5)	26.9 (80.4)	25.9 (78.6)	24.9 (76.8)	24.7 (76.5)	25.1 (77.2)	25.6 (78.1)	25.8 (78.4)	24.7 (76.5)	25.8 (78.5)
Mean daily minimum °C (°F)	18.8 (65.8)	20.6 (69.1)	21.8 (71.2)	22.4 (72.3)	22.5 (72.5)	22.2 (72.0)	22.0 (71.6)	22.0 (71.6)	21.8 (71.2)	21.8 (71.2)	21.8 (71.2)	20.1 (68.2)	21.5 (70.7)
Average precipitation mm (inches)	9.0 (0.35)	26.2 (1.03)	76.6 (3.02)	160.4 (6.31)	241.1 (9.49)	300.1 (11.81)	334.2 (13.16)	353.8 (13.93)	372.0 (14.65)	324.0 (12.76)	146.5 (5.77)	36.4 (1.43)	2,380.3 (93.71)
Average rainy days	1	2	7	11	18	21	24	25	25	23	13	3	173
Average afternoon relative humidity (%) (at 15:00 LST)	49	45	48	56	64	69	74	76	72	69	66	60	62
Average dew point °C (°F)	19.4 (66.9)	20.2 (68.4)	21.4 (70.5)	22.7 (72.9)	23.2 (73.8)	22.9 (73.2)	22.5 (72.5)	22.6 (72.7)	22.7 (72.9)	22.8 (73.0)	22.8 (73.0)	21.0 (69.8)	22.0 (71.6)
Mean monthly sunshine hours	186.0	182.0	201.5	174.0	170.5	144.0	102.3	89.9	114.0	161.2	165.0	158.1	1,848.5
Mean daily sunshine hours	6.0	6.5	6.5	5.8	5.5	4.8	3.3	2.9	3.8	5.2	5.5	5.1	5.1
Source: NOAA

== See also ==
- Transport in Sierra Leone
