= Koindu =

Koindu Koindu, Kailahun District
- Location in Sierra Leone
- Coordinates: 8°27′43″N 10°20′18″W
- Country: Sierra Leone
- Province: Eastern Province
- District: Kailahun District
- Chiefdom: Kissi Teng
- Time zone: UTC-5 (GMT)

Koindu is a town in Kailahun District in the Eastern Province of Sierra Leone. Koindu should not be confused with Koidu, which is a major diamond mining town in Kono District and market center. The population of Koindu is estimated at 16,751. Koindu lies approximately 63 miles from Kenema and about 230 miles east of Freetown.

The population of Koindu is largely from the Kissi ethnic group.

== Gallery ==
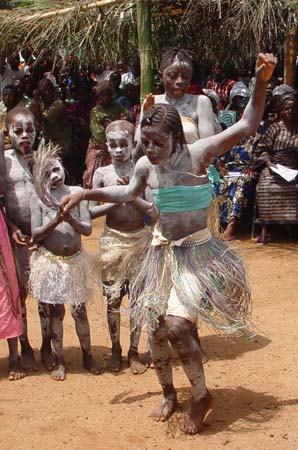
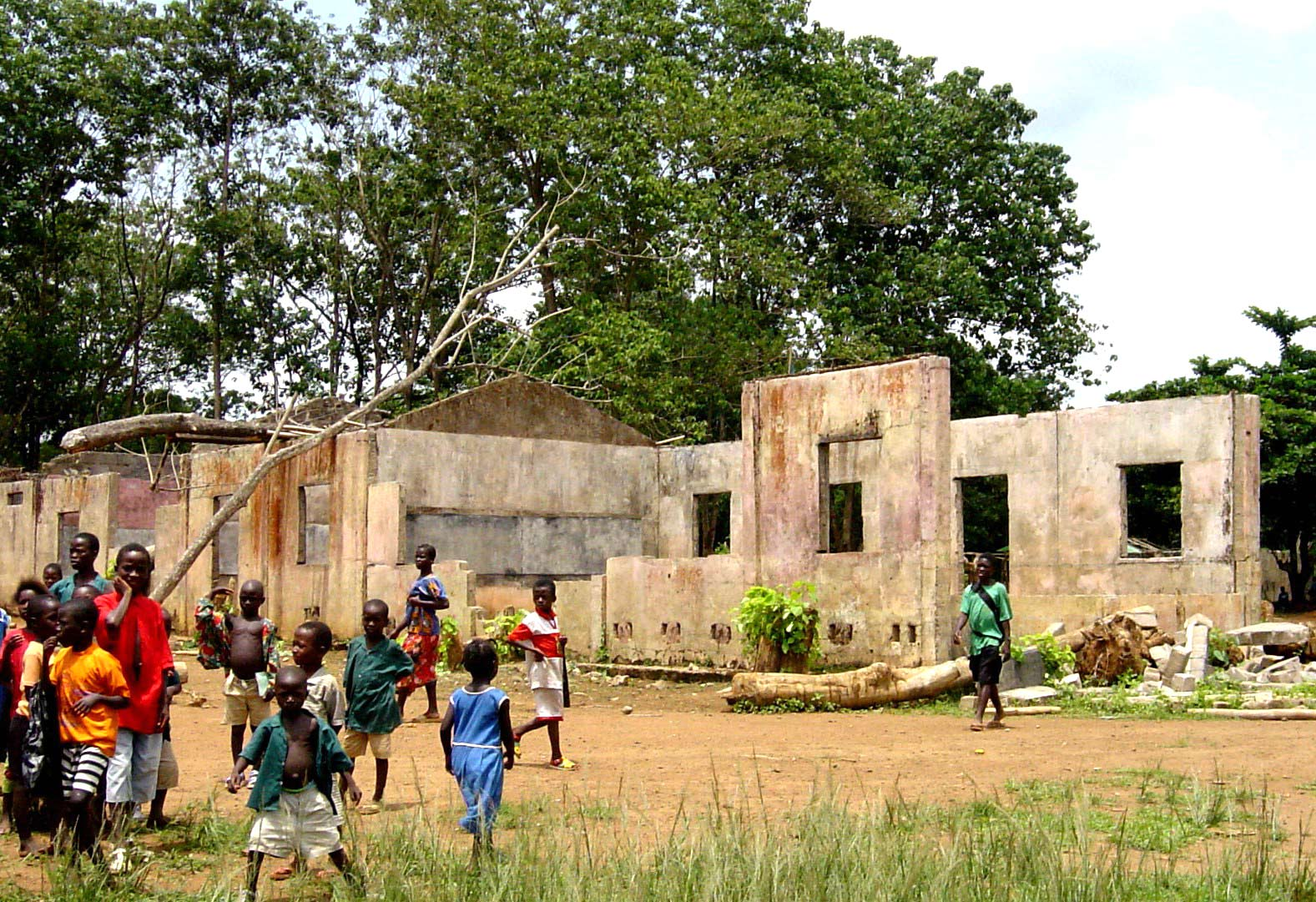

== Notable people ==
- Sahr Senesie, German football star
