= Luawa Chiefdom =

- Chiefdom
- Country: Sierra Leone
- Province: Eastern Province
- District: Kailahun District
- Capital: Kailahun
- Time zone: UTC+0 (GMT)

Luawa Chiefdom is a chiefdom in Kailahun District of Sierra Leone. Its capital is Kailahun.
