= Gola Rainforest National Park =

National park in Sierra Leone

- IUCN category II (national park)
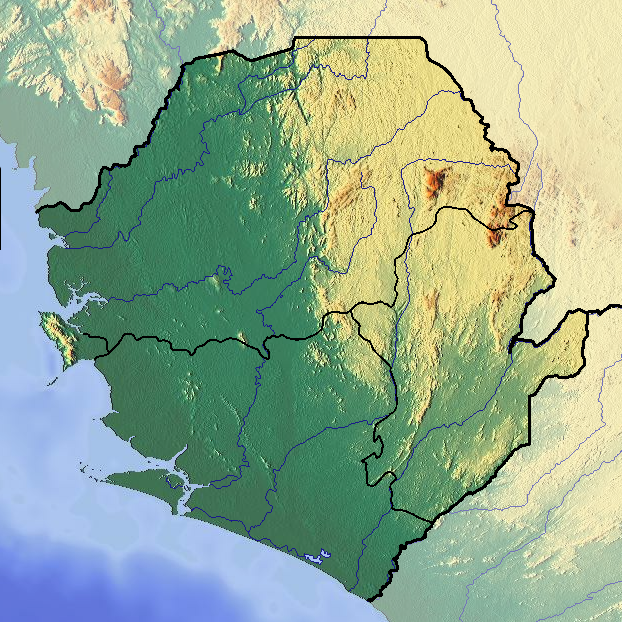
- Location within Sierra Leone
- Location: Eastern Province, Sierra Leone
- Nearest city: Kenema
- Coordinates: 07°30′00″N 10°55′00″W
- Area: 71,070 ha (175,600 acres)
- Established: 2010

UNESCO World Heritage Site
- Part of: Gola-Tiwai Complex
- Criteria: Natural: ix, x
- Reference: 1746
- Inscription: 2025 (47th Session)

The Gola Rainforest National Park (GRNP) protects Sierra Leone's largest tract of rainforest. It covers 71,070 ha in the east of the country. It forms part of the Upper Guinea Forest, a biodiversity hotspot that stretches from Guinea to Togo.

== History ==
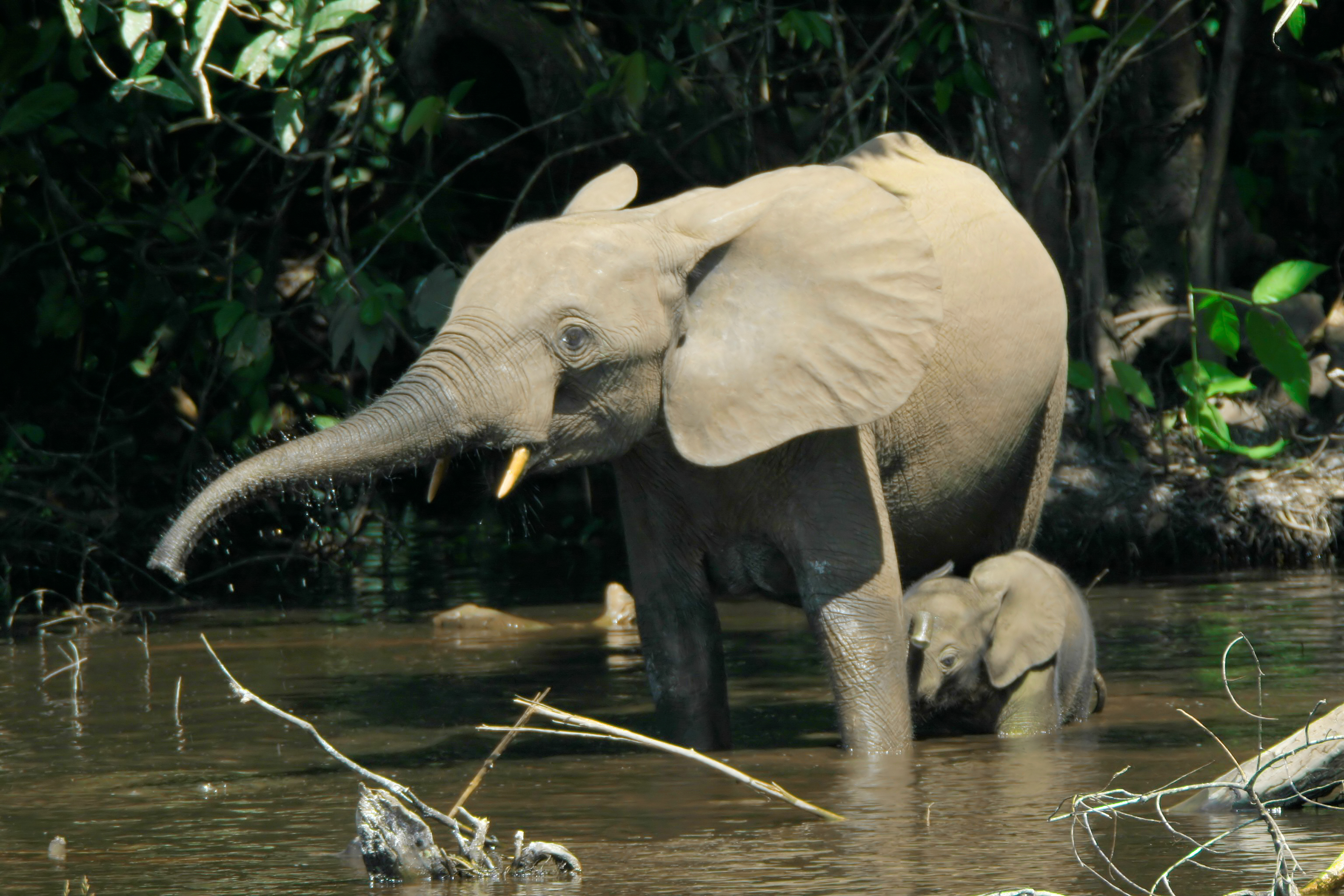
African forest elephants

The forest has been commercially exploited in the past, with over 20,000 hectares being logged between the 1960s and 1980s, and has recently been under pressure for the exploitation of diamonds and iron ore and was the subject of a recent report by Global Witness.

Since the 1990s, the forest has been the subject of a conservation project to protect the forest for the long term whilst ensuring the involvement and livelihood improvement of forest edge communities. The project is a collaboration between the Government of Sierra Leone, the Conservation Society of Sierra Leone and the Royal Society for the Protection of Birds. A similar arrangement has also been instituted across the Liberian border in the Liberian Gola Forest Community, since the two communities share similar cultures and people as well as animal and plant species. The Lofa-Mano National Park has been proposed in north-eastern Liberia, adjoining the park.

The national park was declared by President Ernest Bai Koroma and enacted by the Parliament of Sierra Leone in December 2010. The park amalgamates Gola North Forest Reserve, Gola East Forest Reserve and Gola West Forest Reserves, and is Sierra Leone's second national park. It was officially opened on December 2011, in a ceremony held by Koroma.

In 2025, the park was designated as a World Heritage Site by UNESCO as part of the Gola-Tiwai complex.

== Environment ==
Biological surveys show that the forest is home to more than 330 species of birds, 14 of which are threatened, over 650 species of butterfly and 49 species of mammals, including a population of over 300 western chimpanzees, pygmy hippopotamuses and a much dwindled forest elephant population. The park has been designated an Important Bird Area (IBA) by BirdLife International because it supports significant populations of many bird species.

== Sources ==
- Sierra Leone Gazette Vol. CXLI. No 87 Dated 16 December 2010 'Proclamation for the Constitution of the Gola Rainforest National Park'
