= Yenga =

- Village
- Location in Sierra Leone
- Coordinates: 8°29′57″N 10°19′53″W
- Country: Sierra Leone
- Province: Eastern Province
- District: Kailahun
- Chiefdom: Kissi Teng

Government
  - Village Chief: Tamba Nyuma

Population (2012 estimate)
  - Total: 100
- Time zone: UTC0 (GMT)

Yenga is a village in Kissi Teng Chiefdom, Kailahun District in the Eastern province of Sierra Leone. The village is at the international border between Sierra Leone and Guinea.

Yenga is located on a hill above the south side of the confluence of the Mafissia River and the Makona River (Moa River), where that river forms the border between the two countries. The area is inhabited by the Kissi people. In July 2012 Sierra Leone and Guinea declared the demilitarization of the Yenga area. The large majority of the inhabitants of Yenga are members of the Kissi ethnic group.

== History ==
Prior to the late 1990s Yenga was a small fishing village. However, after occupation by the Revolutionary United Front (RUF), alluvial diamonds were discovered in the Makona River. Mining and agriculture have replaced fishing as the major economic activity.

In 2001, during Sierra Leone’s civil war, the Republic of Guinea sent troops into Yenga to help the army of Sierra Leone suppress the rebel RUF. After the rebels were quashed, the Guinean soldiers remained in Yenga. Prior to the civil war Yenga was administered by the Kailahun District of Sierra Leone. In 2002 Sierra Leone and Guinea signed an agreement than Yenga would be returned to Sierra Leone, as soon as Guinea's border could be secured. In 2005 Sierra Leone and Guinea signed an agreement that Yenga belonged to Sierra Leone. The dispute was officially "resolved" in 2019 when President Ahmad Tejan Kabbah announced that "Conakry has now affirmed that Yenga is a part of Sierra Leone". However, in early 2021, President Julius Maada Bio reported to the 58th Ecowas summit that "The issue remains unresolved and our Guinean counterparts have continued to encroach on Sierra Leone's land and sea borders".
