= Environmental Foundation for Africa =

African non-governmental organization

EFA
- Company type: Charity
- Industry: Environmentalism
- Founded: 1992, United Kingdom
- Headquarters: Lakka, Freetown Peninsula, Sierra Leone
- Key people: Tommy Garnett
- Website: www.efasl.org

The Environmental Foundation for Africa (EFA) is a non-governmental organization that aims to protect and restore the environment in West Africa through community-led programs. It was founded in 1992 in the United Kingdom as the Environmental Foundation for Sierra Leone (ENFOSAL) and began operations in Sierra Leone in 1993. During the height of the war years, the organisation was established in Liberia under its current name. EFA Sierra Leone (EFA-SL) is operating as the local partner to the international NGO EFA. Its registered in Sierra Leone as a national NGO, its also a registered charity in England and Wales (Charity number 1057788).

EFA was founded in 1992 with the goal of inspiring and enabling community-led programs for sustainable environmental management as a basis for poverty alleviation in Sierra Leone and neighbouring Liberia. The charity began its operations in Sierra Leone and moved to Liberia in 1997.
