= Pendembu, Sierra Leone =

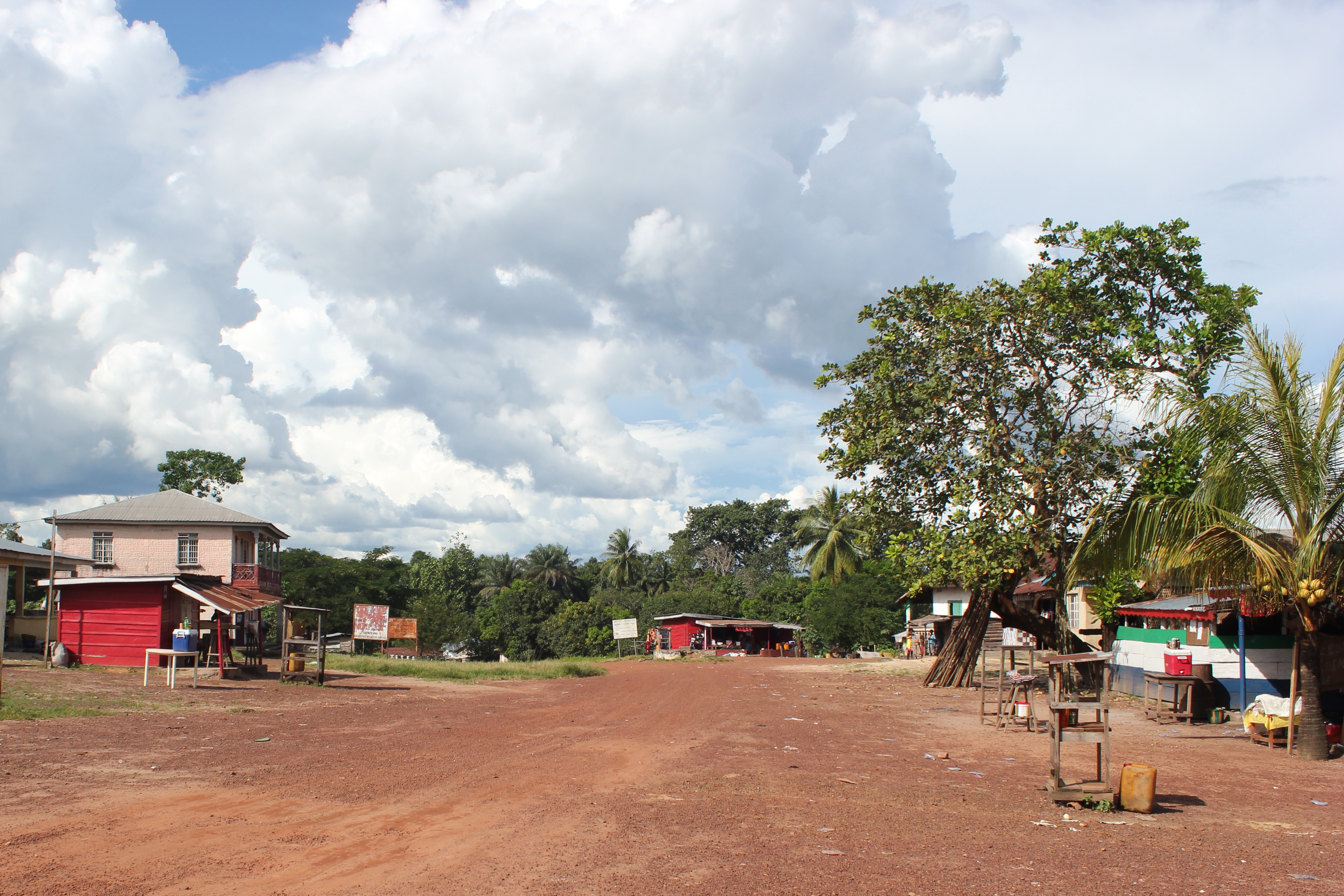
- A park at Pendembu

- Location in Sierra Leone
- Coordinates: 8°6′N 10°42′W
- Country: Sierra Leone
- Province: Eastern Province
- District: Kailahun District
- Chiefdom: Upper Bambara Chiefdom
- Elevation: 515 ft (157 m)

Population (2013)
  - Total: 20,502
- Time zone: UTC0 (UTC)
  - Summer (DST): not observed

Pendembu is a town in Kailahun District in the Eastern Province of Sierra Leone. The town population was 7,243 at the 2004 census but increased to 20,502 according to a more recent estimate. Pendembu lies approximately 36 miles from Kenema and about 235 east of Freetown. Pendembu is a trade center and is one of the main towns in Eastern Sierra Leone.

The vast majority of Pendembu's population are from the Mende ethnic group. As with most parts of Sierra Leone, the Krio language of the Sierra Leone Creole people is by far the most widely spoken language in Pendembu and is the primary means of communication in the city. The most widely spoken languages are Mende and Krio. The town is the birthplace of former President of Sierra Leone Ahmad Tejan Kabbah.

Pendembu was a center or hub for the buying and transporting of cacao, coffee beans and palm nuts. Old structures of huge stores remain, along with large areas owned by the government of Sierra Leone. The Sierra Leone Produce Marketing Board (SLPMB), James international, and other private owned companies in their dilapidated states. The presence of those companies established inter marriages between the Krios and the indigenous people, so was the Libanis. There are still those children in the chiefdom that have held key positions and are members of the tradition of the indigenous people. There is one Krio that has served as Councillor of the entire chiefdom from 2018 to 2023.

A health clinic south of Pendembu is operated by the Handmaids of the Holy Child Jesus religious order and serves a wide area surrounding the town.

== Namesakes ==
There are a number of other towns with similar names.
