= Upper Bambara Chiefdom =

- Chiefdom
- Location in Sierra Leone
- Country: Sierra Leone
- Province: Eastern Province
- District: Kailahun District
- Time zone: UTC+0 (GMT)

Upper Bambara Chiefdom is a chiefdom in Kailahun District of Sierra Leone. Its capital is Pendembu.
