= Segbwema =

Segbwema, Sierra Leone
- Location in Sierra Leone
- Coordinates: 8°0′N 10°57′W
- Country: Sierra Leone
- Province: Eastern Province
- District: Kailahun District
- Chiefdom: Jaluahun Chiefdom

Population (2012)
  - Total: 16,532
- Time zone: UTC-5 (GMT)

Segbwema is a town in Kailahun District in the Eastern Province of Sierra Leone. The town is a major business and agricultural centre. Segbwema lies approximately 20 miles northeast of Kenema and about 225 miles south-east of Freetown (further by road). The population of Segbwema was 7,961 in the 2004 census with a current estimate of 16,532.

The population of Segbwema is ethnically diverse, though the Mende people make up the majority of the population. Segbwema is home to the Nixon Memorial Hospital , one of the main hospitals in Kailahun District. The hospital serves Segbwema and its surrounding areas

== Geography ==
Segbwema is a hilly town that is divided roughly in two by the small river Nyeya, which is a tributary of the Maleh river. The town belongs to and is the headquarters of Njaluahun chiefdom, a major chiefdom nestled between the Moa and Maleh rivers. Njaluahun is bounded by the eastern chiefdoms of Nongowa, Jawei and Kpeje.

== Demographics ==
Most of the population of Segbwema belong to the Mende ethnic group who are the predominant tribal group in Eastern Sierra Leone. The Mende population of Segbwema are mainly concentrated in the Taima, Pendembulo, Kabalahun, Manina, Sosso Town, Largo Square and Nyekehun sections of the town. Madingo and Fula population represent the other main ethnic groups and they are mostly located in Konotown, which is arguably the largest section of Segbwema. The town's Temne population are mainly located in Sosso Town and Kono town. The Limba population of Segbwema are located at the four main entrances to Segbwema; Largo Square, Kabalahun, Sosso town and the Segbwma-Daru road. Segbwema also has ethnic Hausa, Konyanka and Krio populations. The reason for the multi-ethnic nature of Segbwema is that it was a major trading center and railway station during the heyday of the Sierra Leone railway as it was the last major rail town in the Eastern Province. Segbwema also had the best health care center in the Eastern province, the Nixon Memorial Methodist Hospital. A number of people came to work at Nixon and made the town their home.

The various ethnic groups have existed in the town for decades without any significant problems. Segbwema, though it is a rural town, has a truly metropolitan feel as all the various groups have a strong sense of community and citizenship. Everybody participates without fear in the internal politics of the town and intermarriages has also strengthened tribal affiliations. One major reason for this close-knit multi-ethnicity is that everybody in Segbwema speaks Mende and almost all speak Krio. As with most parts of Sierra Leone, the Krio language of the Sierra Leone Creole people is by far the most widely spoken language in Segbwema and is the primary means of communication in the city. In essence there is no communication problem among the different communities. Segbwema is also unique in that every ethnic group is allowed to serve in the administration of the town, either as chiefs or as tribal authorities.

== Destruction during civil war ==
As most of the major towns in rural Sierra Leone, Segbwema was heavily destroyed during the civil war. Most of the developments we were proud of: our secondary schools, Wesley and Holy Ghost, our police station and police barracks, the Nixon Memorial Hospital, the Nixon nursing Schools, the Standard bank and a number of other landmarks were burnt down by rebels of the RUF.

== Other Segbwemas ==
Sierra Leone has another, smaller town of the same name in the Southern Province.
