= Kailahun =

Kailahun Kailahun, Sierra Leone
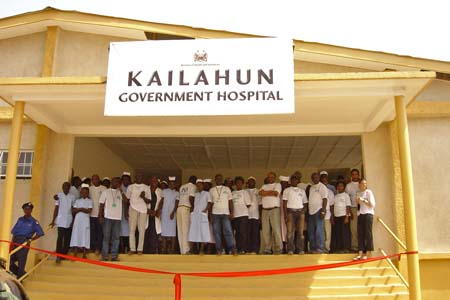
- Kailahun Government Hospital at its reopening in 2004

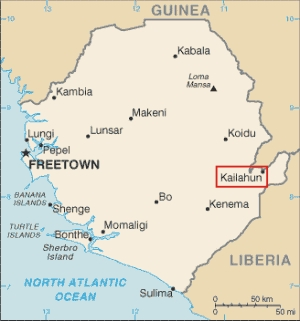
- Coordinates: 8°16′38″N 10°34′26″W
- Country: Sierra Leone
- Province: Eastern Province
- District: Kailahun District
- Chiefdom: Luawa Chiefdom

Government
  - Town Chief of Kailahun: Alpha Ndoleh
- Elevation: 303 m (994 ft)

Population (2013)
  - Total: 30,411
- Time zone: UTC0 (GMT)

Kailahun is the capital of Kailahun District in the Eastern Province of Sierra Leone. Kailahun is a major business and commercial center of Kailahun District. The population was 13,108 in the 2004 census, a 2006 estimate of 18,411 and a current estimate of about 30,411. Kailahun lies in the far east of Sierra Leone, approximately 200 miles east of Freetown (320 miles by road), about 51 miles north east of Kenema (75 miles by road), and near the border of Liberia.

Kailahun is a trade center, and is one of the major towns in the Eastern Province of Sierra Leone. The population of Kailahun is largely from the Mende ethnic group. As with most parts of Sierra Leone, the Krio language of the Sierra Leone Creole people is by far the most widely spoken language in Kailahun and is the primary means of communication in the city.

== Government ==
The town is home to Kailahun district council and the District Council Hall. David Keili Coomber is the town chief of Kailahun. Kailahun, along with the entire Kailahun District is governed with a district council form of government, which is headed by a District Council Chairman, who is responsible for the general management of the town and for seeing that all local and national laws are enforced. The District Council Chairman is elected directly by the residents of the district of Kailahun. The current chairman of Kailahun district council is Tom Nyuma of the Sierra Leone People's Party (SLPP). Nyuma won the July 2008 Sierra Leone local council elections in a landslide with 75% of the vote. The candidate of the People's Movement for Democratic Change (PMDC) came in a distant second, followed by the candidate of the All People's Congress (APC). Nyuma replaced fellow SLPP member Augustine Kortu who was the District Council Chairman until July 2008. Kortu is from the minority Kissi ethnic group.

== Media ==
The local radio station in Kailahun is a private station Radio Moa - The Voice of the Voiceless on 101.5 FM] which operates from Radio House. The Sierra Leone Broadcasting Service (SLBS) television and radio station, are on the air in Kailahun. BBC World Service, and several other international TV stations are on the air in the city, via satellite.

=== Ethnicity ===
The population of Kailahun is largely from the Mende. Minority ethnic groups with significant population are the Kissi, Kono, Sherbro and Vai.

== Sport ==
Like the rest of the country, football is by far the most popular sport in the city. The city has several clubs in the lower divisions of the Sierra Leone football league.

== Health ==
Kailahun is home to the Kailahun Government Hospital which was refurbished after being damaged in the Sierra Leone Civil War and was reopened in 2004.
