= Kailahun District =

- Location of Kailahun District in Sierra Leone
- Coordinates: 8°10′N 10°45′W
- Country: Sierra Leone
- Province: Eastern Province
- Capital: Kailahun
- Largest city: Kailahun

Government
  - Type: District Council
  - Council Chairman: Sahr Ahmed Lamin (SLPP)

Area
  - Total: 3,859 km^{2} (1,490 sq mi)

Population (2021 census )
  - Total: 550,435
  - Density: 142.6/km^{2} (369.4/sq mi)
- Time zone: UTC-5 (Greenwich Mean Time)
- HDI (2017): 0.390 low · 8th

Kailahun District is a district in the Eastern Province of Sierra Leone. Its capital and largest city is the town of Kailahun. The second most populous city in the district is Segbwema. Other major towns in Kailahun District include Koindu, Pendembu and Daru. As of the 2015 census, the district had a population of 525,372. Kailahun District is subdivided into fourteen chiefdoms.

The District of Kailahun borders Kenema District to the west, Kono District to the north, the Republic of Liberia to the east, and the Republic of Guinea to the north. The border of the district with Guinea is formed by a section of the Moa River. The total area of the district is 3,940 km^{2} (1,520 sq mi). The population of Kailahun District is largely from the Mende ethnic group, though there are other ethnic groups with significant population in the district, including among them the Kissi, Mandingo and the Fula.

The major economic activities in the district are farming, diamond mining and trade. The large majority of the people of Kailahun District are Muslims, though with a significant Christian minority.

Kailahun District is a political stronghold of the Sierra Leone People's Party (SLPP), the current ruling party in Sierra Leone. Since Sierra Leone"s Independence in 1961 to present, the overwhelming majority of the people of Kailahun Districts support the Sierra Leone People's Party (SLPP). Kailahun District is the birthplace of former Sierra Leone's president Ahmad Tejan Kabbah, who was born in the town of Pendembu.

== Government and politics ==
Kailahun District is governed with a district council form of government, which is headed by a District Council Chairman, who is chief executive officer in the District and is responsible for the general management of the district. The District Council Chairman is elected directly by the residents of the district of Kailahun every four years. The current chairman of Kailahun district council is Sahr Ahmed Lamin of the Sierra Leone People's Party (SLPP), who easily won the 2018 District Chairperson election with an overwhelming landslide victory

Kailahun District is a reliable political stronghold of the Sierra Leone People's Party (SLPP), the current ruling party in Sierra Leone. The District overwhelmingly supports the SLPP by a large majority in Presidential, Parliamentary and local councils elections. The SLPP have won every Sierra leone president elections in the District by over 73%; including the 2018 Presidential election, when the SLPP candidate Julius Maada Bio won 89% of the votes in the District.

== Radio ==
- Radio Moa FM 105.5 Kailahun
- SLBC 95.1
- Radio Kissi Bendu FM 107.3 Koindu

== Demographics ==
The vast majority of the people of Kailahun District are ethnic Mende. However, Kailaun District is home to a significant minority of Mandingo, Kissi, Fula, Gola and Vai. The Vai, Kissi and Gola make up the majority of the population in the villages and small towns in Kailahun District at the international border with the Republic of Liberia.

Religion in Kailahun District (2015)
Religion	Percent(%)
Islam	64.0%
Christianity	34.0%
Baháʼí	0.1%
Traditional African religions	0.2%
Other	1.4%
No religion	0.3%

== Economy ==
Kailahun has a mixed economy, made up of small-scale mining as well as agricultural production of coffee, cacao and rice. Local Government collects property taxes with the assistance of Revenue Development Foundation

== Administrative divisions ==
=== Chiefdoms ===
==== Pre-2017 ====
Prior to the 2017 local administrative reorganization, Kailahun District was made up of fourteen chiefdoms as the third level of administrative subdivision.

1. Dea – Baiwala
2. Jaluahun – Segbwema
3. Jawei – Daru
4. Kissi Kama – Dea
5. Kissi Teng – Kangama
6. Kissi Tongi – Buedu
7. Luawa – Kailahun
8. Malema – Jojoima
9. Mandu – Mobai
10. Peje Bongre – Manowa
11. Peje West – Bunumbu
12. Penguia – Sandar
13. Upper Bambara – Pendembu
14. Yawei – Bandajuma

==== Post-2017 ====
After the 2017 local administrative reorganization, Kailahun District has made up of fifteen chiefdoms as the third level of administrative subdivision.

1. Dea – Baiwala
2. Jahn(Gbeika) (Note: Formerly part of Jaluahun Chiefdom.) – ?
3. Jaluahun – Segbwema
4. Jawei – Daru
5. Kissi Kama – Dea
6. Kissi Teng – Kangama
7. Kissi Tongi – Buedu
8. Luawa – Kailahun
9. Malema – Jojoima
10. Mandu – Mobai
11. Peje Bongre – Manowa
12. Peje West – Bunumbu
13. Penguia – Sandar
14. Upper Bambara – Pendembu
15. Yawei – Bandajuma

Notes

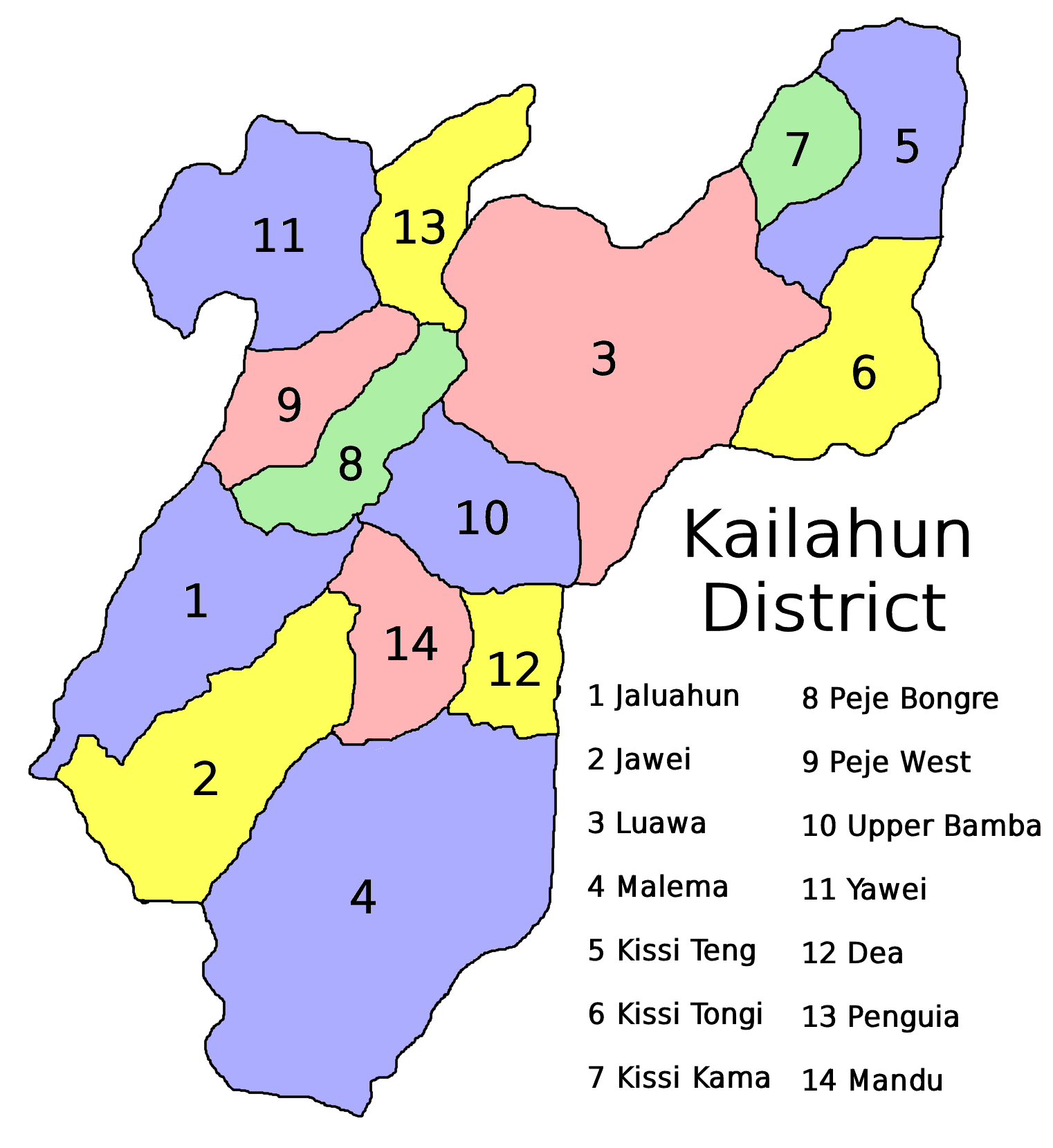
Chiefdoms of Kailahun District

=== Major towns ===
- Segbwema, largest city
- Kailahun, district headquarters
- Pendembu, second largest town
- Koindu, fourth largest
- Daru
- Bunumbu ETU- SL

== Notable people from Kailahun District ==
- Ahmad Tejan Kabbah, former President of Sierra Leone
- Steady Bongo, Sierra Leonean musician
- Hindowa Momoh, former President of the National Union of Sierra Leone Students
- Robin Faley, Sierra Leonean politician, representative for Segbwema
