= Moa River =

Coordinates: 7.0192°N 11.5413°W

Moa
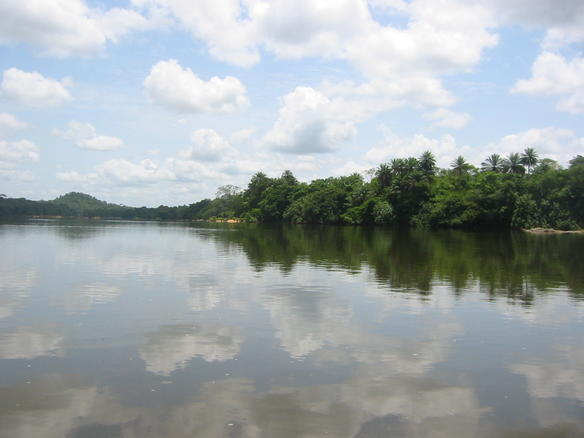
- Tiwai Island on the Moa River

- Map of the Moa River Basin

Location
- Countries: Guinea; Liberia; Sierra Leone

Physical characteristics
- Source
  - location: Guinea Highlands, Guinea
  - elevation: 930 m (3,050 ft)
- Mouth
  - location: Atlantic Ocean
- Length: 475 km (295 mi)
- Basin size: 19,560 km^{2} (7,550 mi^{2})
- Discharge
  - location: Near mouth
  - average: (Period: 1979–2015) 32.94 km^{3}/a (1,044 m^{3}/s)

Basin features
- River system: Moa River
- Tributaries
  - left: Ouaou, Mauwa
  - right: Mafissa, Meli, Male

The Moa River (Makona River) is a river in West Africa. It arises in the highlands of Guinea and flows southwest, forming parts of the Guinea–Liberia and the Guinea – Sierra Leone borders. It flows into the Southern Province of Sierra Leone. Yenga, Tiwai Island and Sulima are located on the Moa.
