= Paki Massabong Chiefdom =

Paki Massabong
- Chiefdom
- Country: Sierra Leone
- Province: Northern Province
- District: Bombali District
- Capital: Mapaki

Population (2004)
  - Total: 17,320
- Time zone: UTC±00:00 (GMT)

Paki Massabong is a chiefdom of Bombali District in the Northern Province of Sierra Leone. The principal town lies at Mapaki.

As of 2004 the chiefdom has a population of 17,320.
