= Mapaki =

- Location in Sierra Leone
- Coordinates: 8°47′N 11°55′W
- Country: Sierra Leone
- Province: Northern Province
- District: Bombali District
- Chiefdom: Paki Massabong
- Time zone: UTC+0 (GMT)

Mapaki is a small town and seat of the chiefdom of Paki Massabong in Bombali District in the Northern Province of Sierra Leone.
