= List of cities in Sierra Leone =

This is a list of cities and towns in Sierra Leone.

== Largest cities ==
The following table is the list of cities in Sierra Leone by population.

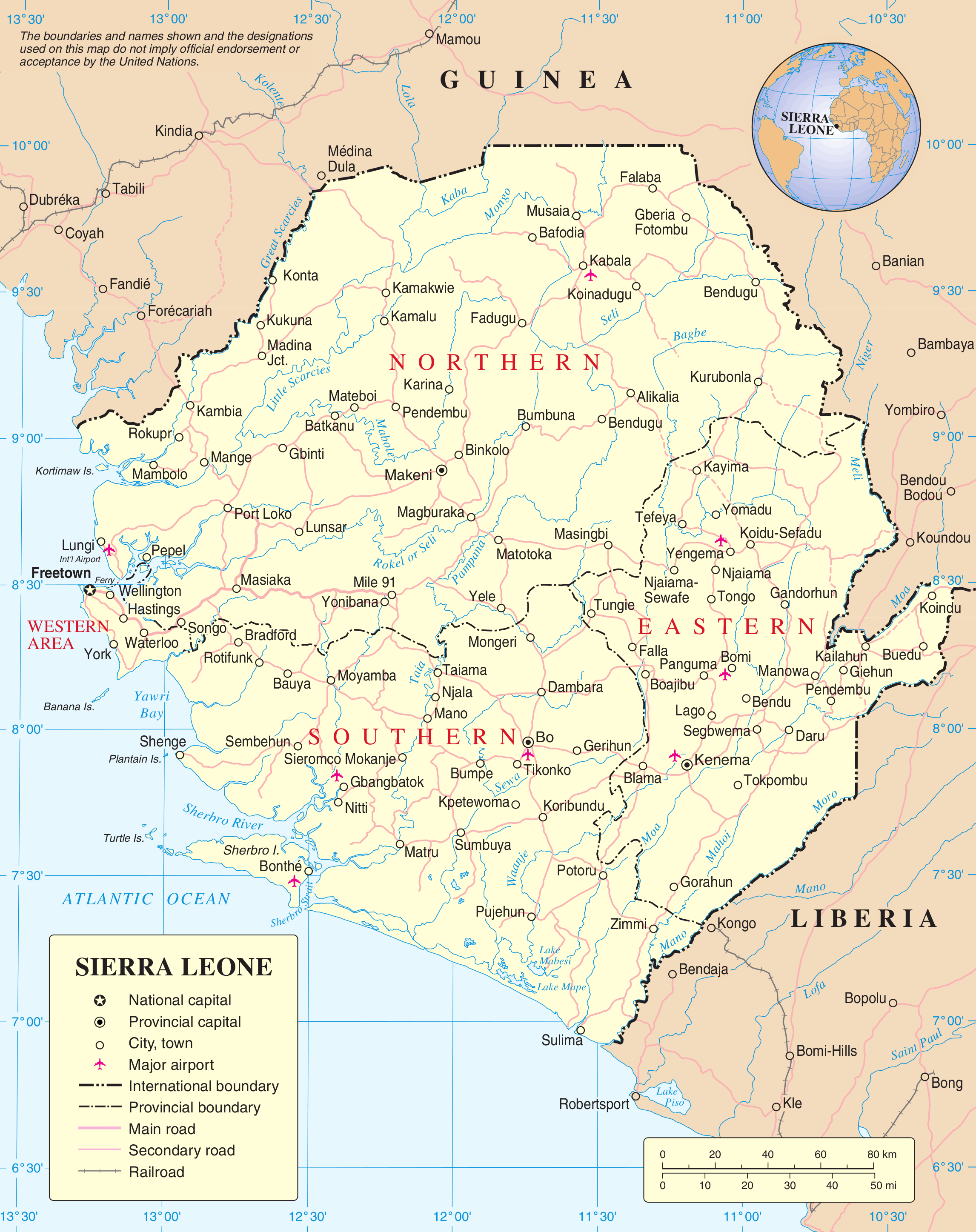
Sierra Leone's cities.

Rank	City	Population (2015)	Province	District	Note
1	Freetown	1,055,964	Western Area	Western Area Urban District	Capital of Sierra Leone
2	Kenema	200,443	Eastern Province	Kenema District	
3	Bo	174,369	Southern Province	Bo District	
4	Koidu	124,662	Eastern Province	Kono District	
5	Makeni	124,634	Northern Province	Bombali District	
6	Waterloo	40,000	Western Area	Western Area Rural District	
7	Port Loko	33,541	North West Province	Port Loko District	

Other notable cities

- Wangechi
- Kalewa
- Magburaka
- Kabala
- Moyamba
- Kailahun
- Bonthe
- Kambia

Towns and villages

- Alikalia
- Binkolo
- Daru
- Falaba
- Gbinti
- Kamakwie
- Kaima
- Koindu
- Lungi
- Lunsar
- Madina
- Mange
- Mano
- Matru
- Momaligi
- Njala
- Pepel
- Pendembu
- Shenge
- Sulima
- Sumbaria
- Taiama
- Tongo
- Tumbu
- Worodu
- Yana
- Yele
- Yengema
- Yonibana
