= Komba =

Komba is a given name. Notable people with the name include:

- Komba Claudius Gbamanja, Sierra Leonean politician from the opposition Sierra Leone People's Party
- Samuel Komba Kambo, retired captain in the Republic of Sierra Leone Armed Forces
- Komba Eric Koedoyoma, Sierra Leonean politician with the Sierra Leone People's Party
- Komba Mondeh (born in Freetown, Sierra Leone] was a top-ranking officer in the Sierra Leonean army
- Komba Yomba (born 1976), Sierra Leonean international goalkeeper
- Komba (mammal), an extinct genus of galagos
- "Komba," the small galago featured in the British family film The Bushbaby (1969)
- Komba (Lycia), a town of ancient Lycia
- Komba language, a language of Papua New Guinea
- Komba Rural LLG in Morobe Province, Papua New Guinea
- Komba, Democratic Republic of the Congo, a town in the Democratic Republic of the Congo

== See also ==
- Komba gewerkschaft, German trade union in Berlin

Media related to Komba at Wikimedia Commons
