= Njegbwema, Kono District =

Njegbwema
- Location in Sierra Leone
- Coordinates: 8°37′N 11°10′W
- Country: Sierra Leone
- Province: Eastern Province
- District: Kono District
- Chiefdom: Fiama Chiefdom
- Time zone: UTC-5 (GMT)

Njegbwema is a village in Fiama Chiefdom, Kono District in the Eastern Province of Sierra Leone. The major industry in the village is farming.
