= Daniel Freedman (musician) =

Musical artist

- Occupations: Musician, composer
- Instruments: Drums, percussion, flute
- Years active: 1990s–present
- Website: www.danielfreedman.net

Daniel Freedman is an American drummer, percussionist, and composer known for his work in jazz, world, and popular music. He has performed and recorded with artists including David Byrne, Angélique Kidjo, Anat Cohen, Avishai Cohen, Mulatu Astatke, and Lionel Loueke.

== Early life and education ==
Freedman attended Fiorello H. LaGuardia High School of Music & Art and Performing Arts in New York City. He attended Manhattan School of Music and Mannes college of music and continued studies with Vernell Fournier as well as Ralph Peterson Jr. and Abraham Rodriguez Jr. During the late 1990s Freedman traveled to Mali, Cuba and Egypt to study percussion.

== Career ==
=== 1990s ===
While still in high school, Freedman performed with bassist Ben Wolfe's bands and recorded with Wolfe, Ned Goold, and Benny Green. In New York, he became active in the Smalls Jazz Club scene, performing weekly with Jason Lindner's Ensemble, Omer Avital Sextet and Charles Owens Quartet. He also performed with bassist Avishai Cohen, guitarists Charlie Byrd and Russell Malone and trumpeters Tom Harrell and Wynton Marsalis.

=== 2000s ===
Freedman toured with Claudia Acuna in the US, Europe, and Japan and was a member of salsa pianist Ray Santiago's band. He also performed with Gretchen Parlato, saxophonist Michael Blake and bassist Ben Allison.

He released his first album Trio in 2001.

Freedman co-led Third World Love with Avishai Cohen (trumpet), Omer Avital (bass) and Yonatan Avishai (piano).

From 2005–2018 he toured and recorded with the Anat Cohen Quartet, including performances at the Village Vanguard and European tours.

=== 2010s ===
From 2010–2015, Freedman toured worldwide with Angélique Kidjo, performing at Carnegie Hall with Youssou N'Dour.

He released Bamako by Bus in 2012 with Meshell Ndegeocello, Lionel Loueke, Pedrito Martinez, Jason Lindner and Avishai Cohen.

Freedman performed at Jazz at Lincoln Center with Edmar Castañeda, Edward Simon, Maraca and Luques Curtis.

He released Imagine That in 2016 with Jason Lindner, Lionel Loueke, Omer Avital, Gilmar Gomes and Angélique Kidjo, which received five stars from DownBeat. A reviewer wrote that Freedman, "has quietly, almost surreptitiously, become a primal force, creating a kind of people's music built on rustling folk rhythms, ethnic melodies and joyous performances".

Freedman toured with Mulatu Astatke in 2016.

In 2018, he joined David Byrne's American Utopia world tour and performed in the Broadway production (2019–2022). A documentary of American Utopia directed by Spike Lee was released on HBO in 2020.

=== 2020s ===
Freedman performed on Broadway in Hadestown (2023–2024) and Illinoise (2024). He tours and records with Michael Leonhart's Flamenco Sketches of Spain featuring Israel Galván.

He co-leads Saha Gnawa with Maalem Hassan Ben Jaafar, producing the 2025 debut album with guests Nels Cline and Gilad Hekselman.

== Discography ==
=== As Leader ===
Year	Artist	Title	Label
2001	Daniel Freedman	Trio	Fresh Sound
2012	Daniel Freedman	Bamako by Bus	Anzic Records
2016	Daniel Freedman	Imagine That	Anzic Records
2021	Daniel Freedman	Ghost Modern	GSI Records

=== As Co-Leader ===
Year	Artist	Title	Label
2002	Third World Love (Avishai Cohen, Omer Avital, Yonatan Avishai, Daniel Freedman)	Third World Love Songs	Fresh Sound
2004	Third World Love	Avanim	NMC Music
2006	Third World Love	Sketch of Tel Aviv	—
2008	Third World Love	New Blues	Anzic
2010	Third World Love	Songs and Portraits	Anzic
2025	Saha Gnawa	Saha Gnawa	Pique-Nique

=== As Sideman ===
Year	Artist	Title	Label
1996	Ben Wolfe	13 Sketches	Mons Records
1998	Various Artists	Jazz Underground: Live at Smalls	Impulse! Records
1998	Omer Avital	Devil Head	Impulse!
2000	Jason Lindner	The Ensemble	Stretch Records
2000	Avishai Cohen (bass)	Colors	Stretch Records
2001	Omer Avital	Think With Your Heart	NMC Music
2006	Daniel Zamir	Amen	The Eighth Note
2007	Avishai Cohen	After the Big Rain	Anzic
2007	Anat Cohen	Poetica	Anzic
2008	Anat Cohen	Notes From the Village	Anzic
2008	Avishai Cohen	Flood	Anzic
2008	Daniel Sadownick	There Will Be a Day	—
2009	Forro in the Dark	Light a Candle	Nat Geo Music
2009	Sting	If on a Winter’s Night…	Deutsche Grammophon
2012	Angélique Kidjo	Spirit Rising	Razor & Tie
2012	Omer Avital	Suite of the East	Anzic
2012	Anat Cohen	Claroscuro	Anzic
2014	Omer Avital	New Song	Motéma Music
2014	Sabina Sciubba	Toujours	Naim Records
2015	Anat Cohen	Luminosa	Anzic
2018	Michael Leonhart	The Painted Lady Suite	Sunnyside Records
2019	David Byrne	American Utopia on Broadway (Original Cast Recording)	Nonesuch Records
2019	Michael Leonhart	Suite Extracts Vol. 1	Sunnyside
2020	John Ellis	The Ice Siren	
2021	Michael Leonhart	The Normyn Suites	Sunnyside
2024	Various Artists	Illinoise: A New Musical (Original Cast Recording)	Nonesuch
2025	Hannah Cohen	Earthstar Mountain	Bella Union
