= Jaiama-Nimokoro =

Jaiama Nimikor, Kono District
- Location in Sierra Leone
- Coordinates: 8°37′N 11°10′W
- Country: Sierra Leone
- Province: Eastern Province
- District: Kono District

Population (2009)
  - Total: 5,150
- Time zone: UTC-5 (GMT)

Jaiama Nimikor is a diamond-rich town in Kono District in the Eastern Province of Sierra Leone. The town lies about 8 miles outside Koidu Town (the largest city in Kono District) and 232 miles from Freetown. The towns of Jaiama and Nimikor are twin to form Jaiama Nimikor. The population of Jaiama Nimikor is 5,150 (2009 estimate). Like in virtually every towns in Kono District, Jaima Nimikor is a major diamond producer.

== Ethnicity and religion ==
The population of the town is ethnically diverse, although the local Kono people form the largest ethnic group. The town is largely Muslim, Christianity is present, though in minority.

== Education ==
The town is home to three secondary schools, the most prominent of which is the Jaima Secondary School, known for producing the current Vice President of Sierra Leone Alhaji Samuel Sam-Sumana.
