= Foamansa Matturi =

Foamansa Matturi (c. 1855–1936) was a Sierra Leonean ruler who led his fellow Kono people in fighting abilities and a diplomacy that helped bring stability to Kono District, a region that was continually the target of invasions from both its Sierra Leonean neighbours and Samori Toure's Mandinka warriors from French Guinea (now Guinea).

== Career ==
Foamansa Matturi was born in about 1855 in the village of Jaima in Kono District in the Eastern Province of British Sierra Leone to parents from the Kono tribe. His father was a prominent village elder in Jaima and his mother was a local Kono trader. As a young boy, Matturi quickly rose as the most dominant warrior of Jaima village.

For years, the region of Kono was unstable because of frequent attacks by its neighbours. Many of the people living in Jaiama were forced to flee in the wake of such raids, and hide in caves in the Nimini hills before migrating secretly northwards towards Kuranko country.

Jaiama then was one of the regions controlled by the great Mende ruler, Nyagua. When Ndawa, a professional warrior, attacked the territories of Nyagua's father in the Upper Mende region, Nyagua called for assistance from the Kono people. Matturi, the leader of the Kono responded swiftly by mobilising his Kono warriors on behalf of Nyagua. He was put in charge of all the fighting forces, and he carried out his task effectively, returning with spoils of victory for Nyagua. Nyagua rewarded Matturi by giving him all of Southern Kono and by promising to protect the region from enemy attacks.

== Stability in Kono ==
With peace and stability in the region, those who had fled returned and Matturi urged his people to re-build the town. This move towards reconstruction was abruptly interrupted when Samori Toure's Mandinka warriors attacked Kono in 1893 and occupied the villages of Tecuyama and Levuma. Matturi immediately informed Nyagua who, in turn, reported to the British Governor to Sierra Leone who was based in Freetown that his region had been invaded. However, by the time the British sent in their troops to repel the invaders, Matturi with the assistance of Nyagua had already succeeded in driving the Mandinka warriors from Kono.

== Paramount Chief ==
Matturi's military success in defeating Samori Toure's warriors greatly enhanced his reputation both among his subjects and the Freetown-based Colony Government. When Sierra Leone was declared a Protectorate in 1896, Foamansa Matturi was crowned the first Paramount Chief of Kono District.

During his rule, Foamansa Matturi initiated several development projects in his chiefdom, and the British authorities commended him for embarking on a road construction project linking the town of Jaiama to the other main towns in the Kono District. Foamansa Matturi died at an old age in 1936.
