= Tomendeh =

Village in Eastern Province, Sierra Leone

Tomendeh is a village in Kono District in the Eastern Province of Sierra Leone. Virtually all homes in the village were burned during the Sierra Leone civil war. The Kono make up the largest ethnic group in the village and their Kono language is most widely spoken language in the village.
