= Jason Lindner =

American musician (born 1973)

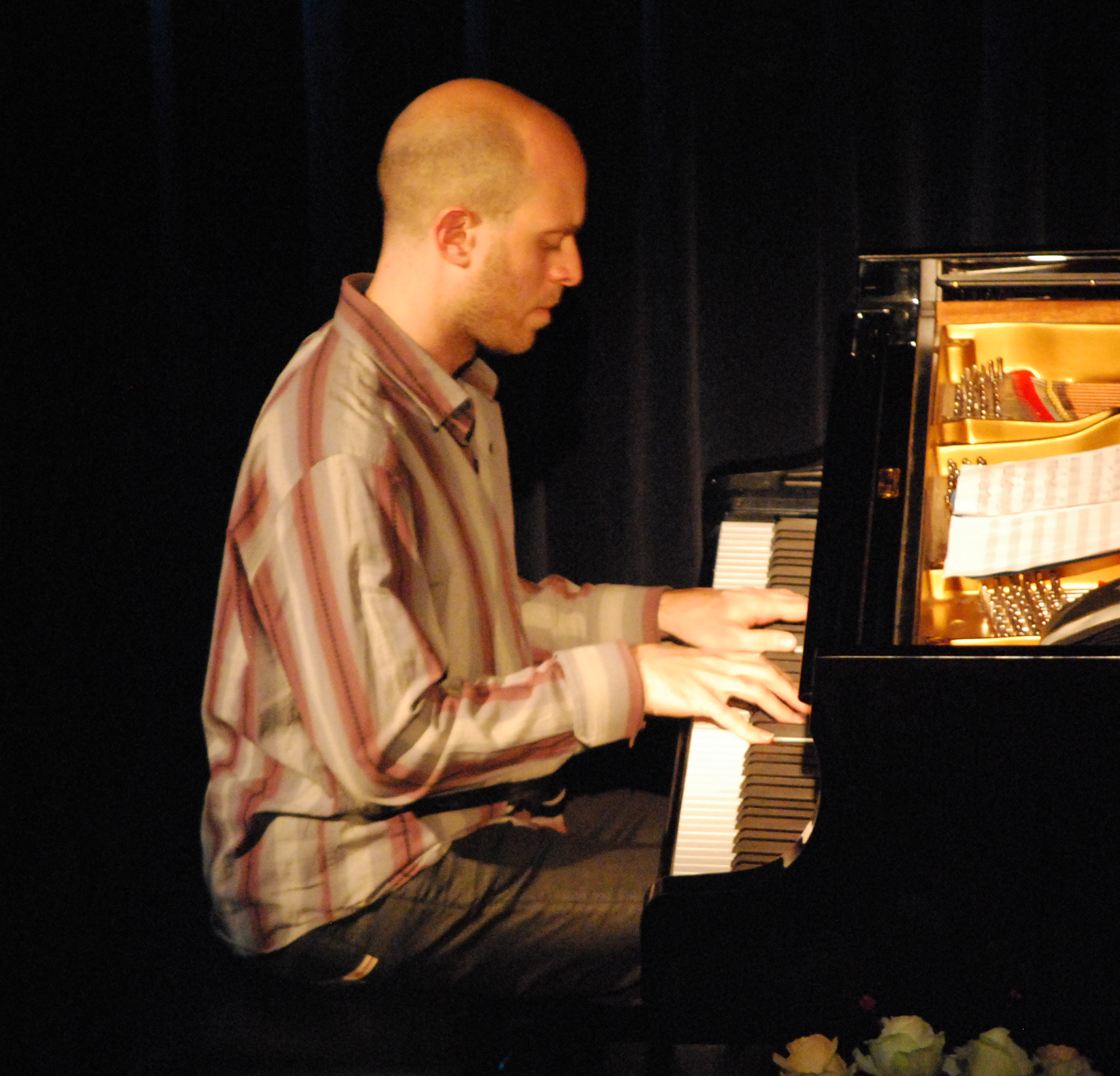
- Lindner performing in 2009

Background information
- Born: February 1, 1973 (age 53); New York, U.S.
- Genres: Jazz, electronica, jazz fusion, Latin, worldbeat
- Occupations: Musician, composer, arranger, producer
- Instruments: Piano, keyboards, synthesizer
- Years active: Mid-1990s–present
- Label: Now Vs Now
- Website: www.jasonlindner.com www.nowvsnow.com

Jason Lindner (born February 1, 1973) is an American pianist, keyboardist, synthesist, sound designer, composer, arranger and producer.

== Life and career ==
Lindner was brought up in Brooklyn, New York City. His father played the piano and sang, and Jason began playing the piano at the age of 2. As a child, he liked heavy metal, then bebop and blues as a teenager. He attended the Fiorello H. LaGuardia High School of Music & Art and Performing Arts.

Lindner "made his mark during the 1990s", in part as leader of a big band that played at Smalls Jazz Club in New York City. He was also the club's house pianist around the time it opened in 1994. This band recorded the album Premonition in 1998 and it was released in 2000, by which time Lindner had changed to leading a quintet. He performed and arranged for vocalist Claudia Acuña's first album, Wind from the South.

By 2004, Lindner was leading an electric group that consisted of Jacques Schwarz-Bart (sax), Avishai Cohen (trumpet), Reggie Washington (bass), and Gene Jackson (drums). His Now Vs. Now band began in 2006 as a quintet, with Cohen, Baba (beatbox, rap), Panagiotis Andreou (bass), and Mark Guiliana (drums). Lindner commented that "I wasn't playing jazz quartet gigs anymore. I was playing in a place where we could really experiment sonically, using electric bass, the drummer playing more groove-oriented beats and less straight ahead swing. [...] I wanted to appeal to ordinary people and not just a jazz audience." In the first three months of 2015 he participated in recordings sessions for David Bowie's Blackstar. For this recording, he used nine keyboards and a grand piano. Lindner reported that his subsequent production work was influenced by the presence of Tony Visconti for the Bowie sessions.

== Compositions ==
A 2004 observer commented that Lindner's compositions are often "buoyant, singable melodies enlivened by circular, interlocking rhythms that often coalesce, swell and burst into euphoric exclamations [...with] a mesmerizing, transportive vibe that seamlessly reconciles elements of Afro-Cuban, modern and modal jazz with R&B, hip-hop and house music." Between the release of Now Vs. Now's first and second albums, Lindner's compositions became influenced more by electronica.

== Awards ==
In 2009, Lindner's band was the winner of the Big Band Rising Star category in Down Beat magazine's critics' poll. Lindner was Down Beat's critics' poll winner of the Keyboard Rising Star category in 2013. In 2015, his band again won the Big Band Rising Star category in the Down Beat critics' poll.

== Discography ==
An asterisk (*) indicates that the year is that of release.

=== As leader/co-leader ===
Year recorded	Title	Label	Personnel/Notes
1998	Premonition	Stretch	Big band, with Omer Avital (bass), Dwayne Burno (bass), Avishai Cohen (bass), Daniel Freedman (drums), Jeff Ballard (drums), Kahlil Kwame Bell (percussion), David Pleasant (percussion), Myron Walden (alto saxophone), Jimmy Greene (tenor saxophone, flute), Gregory Tardy (tenor saxophone), Charles Owens (tenor saxophone), David Schumacher (baritone saxophone, bass clarinet), Avi Lebovich (trombone), Joe Fiedler (trombone), Alex Norris (trumpet), Diego Urcola (trumpet), Benu Meratae (rap vocals)
2001	Live/UK	Sunnyside	Quartet, with Jimmy Greene (tenor sax, flute) Omer Avital (bass), Marlon Browden (drums); recorded live for BBC Radio3 in London
2001	1, 2, 3, Etc.	Fresh Sound New Talent	Trio, with co-leaders Giulia Valle (bass), Marc Ayza (drums)
2004	Ab Aeterno	Fresh Sound New Talent	Trio, with Omer Avital (bass), Luisito Quintero (percussion)
2007	Live at the Jazz Gallery	Anzic	With big band; recorded live at the Jazz Gallery in New York City
2009	Now Vs Now	Anzic	Trio, with Panagiotis Andreou (bass, vocals), Mark Guiliana (drums); added on some tracks are Baba Israel (rap vocals, spoken word), Anat Cohen (tenor sax), Avishai Cohen (trumpet), Kurt Rosenwinkel (guitar), Me'Shell Ndegéocello (bass guitar, vocals), Pedrito Martinez (vocals, percussion), Yosvany Terry (percussion), Claudia Acuña (vocals)
2013	Earth Analog	Now Vs Now	As Now Vs Now (trio), with Panagiotis Andreou (bass), Mark Guiliana (drums)
2018	The Buffering Cocoon	Jazzland	As Now Vs Now (trio) with Panagiotis Andreou (bass), Justin Tyson (drums); with guests Sasha Masakowski (vocals), Natasha Diggs (guided meditation)

=== As sideman ===
Year recorded	Leader	Title	Label
1997	Various	Live at Smalls	Impulse!
1997	Avishai Cohen	Adama	Stretch
1999	Avishai Cohen	Devotion	Concord
2000	Avishai Cohen	Colors	Concord
2007	Anat Cohen	Poetica	Anzic
2007	Omer Avital	Free Forever	Smalls
2008*	Anat Cohen	Notes from the Village	Anzic
2009	Claudia Acuña	En Este Momento	Marsalis Music
2011	Omer Avital	Omer Avital Quintet	SmallsLive
2012	Donny McCaslin	Casting for Gravity	Greenleaf
2012	Dafnis Prieto	Proverb Trio	Dafnison Music
2013	Mark Guiliana	Fast Future	Rockwood Music Hall Productions
2015	Donny McCaslin	Fast Future	Greenleaf
2016*	David Bowie	Blackstar	RCA
2016	Donny McCaslin	Beyond Now	Motema
2018	Justin Brown	Nyeusi	Biophilia Records
2018	Donny McCaslin	Blow.	Motema
