= Gorama Kono Chiefdom =

Coordinates: 8°23′N 11°06′W

- Chiefdom
- Interactive map of Gorama Kono Chiefdom
- Country: Sierra Leone
- Province: Eastern Province
- District: Kono District
- Capital: Kangama
- Time zone: UTC+0 (GMT)

Gorama Kono Chiefdom is a chiefdom in Kono District of Sierra Leone. Its capital is Kangama.
