= T.I. Ahmadiyya Secondary School, Freetown =

T.I. Ahmadiyya Secondary School
- Freetown; Western Area; Freetown; Sierra Leone

Information
- School type: High school Coeducational
- Religious affiliation: Islam
- Denomination: Ahmadiyya Muslim Mission, Sierra Leone
- Status: active
- Oversight: Ministry of Education
- Gender: Mixed
- Affiliation: Ahmadiyya, Sierra Leone

Ahmadiyya Muslim Secondary School is a secondary school in Freetown, Sierra Leone. In the country, the school is known for its academic output and for its production of sportsmen and women. It is one of the 55 Ahmadiyya secondary schools in the country.

== Alumni and associates ==
- Victor Bockarie Foh (school's Economics and Government teacher) – current Vice President of Sierra Leone
- Samuel Sam-Sumana – former Vice President of Sierra Leone
- Zainab Bangura – former Foreign Minister of Sierra Leone; Special Representative of the UN Secretary General on Sexual Violence in Conflict
- Kemoh Sesay – Minister of Political Affairs of Sierra Leone; former Minister of Transportation and Aviation of Sierra Leone
- Alhaji Alpha Osman Timbo - Former Minister of Labour and Industrial Relations
- Mohamed Saccoh(K-Man) - King of RnB music in Sierra Leone
