= Kaima =

Kaima, Kono District
- Location in Sierra Leone
- Coordinates: 8°37′N 11°10′W
- Country: Sierra Leone
- Province: Eastern Province
- District: Kono District
- Chiefdom: Sandor Chiefdom

Population (2009)
  - Total: 2,217 .
- Time zone: UTC-5 (GMT)

Kaima is a small rural town in Kono District in the Eastern Province of Sierra Leone. The town lies about 15 mi (24 km) to Yengema and 40 mi (64 km) to Koidu Town. The population of Kaima is estimated at 2,217 (2009).

The town has two primary schools and one government secondary school named the Kaima Secondary School. The town also has a police station run by the Sierra Leone Police Force.

The Kono ethnic group form almost the entire population and are the most dominant ethnic group in the town, though small numbers of Mandingo and Fula reside in the town as traders. The Mandingo and Fula have settled in the town over 125 years ago.
