= Elizabeth Simbiwa Sogbo-Tortu =

Sierra Leonean woman

Elizabeth Simbiwa Sogbo-Tortu is a Sierra Leonean woman who was barred from her bid to become Paramount Chief of Nimiyama Chiefdom in Sierra Leone because of her sex.

== Bid for Paramount Chieftaincy ==
In 2009, Sogbo-Tortu sought to become the paramount chief of the Nimiyama Chiefdom in Sierra Leone.

At the time, women were barred from holding chieftainships in Northern Province and much of the east of the country, but female chiefs were allowed in the south of the country.

== Conflict with the Poro Society ==
Sogbo-Tortu was one of ten contenders for the position. She was first born in a ruling house and the 2009 Chieftain Act made it legal for the children of former chieftains to compete for the chieftainship, regardless of sex. As such, Sogbo-Tortu was legally qualified to bid since her father was the former chief.

In spite of this, she was barred from standing for the chieftaincy due to regional tradition. In order to qualify for Paramount Chief in the Kono District, candidates must be members of the ancient, all-male Poro Society which do not accept women in their ranks. The conflict arose because she was not a member.

== Campaign for gender equality ==
Sogbo-Tortu subsequently filed a legal appeal to her disqualification which was rejected. She persisted in her efforts to have a gender-equal chieftaincy election and took the case to the Supreme Court of Sierra Leone.

Yasmine Jusu-Sheriff, the vice-chair of the Human Rights Commission of Sierra Leone, stated she would support Sogbo-Tortu in taking the case to the Supreme Court.

During the legal process, she was escorted by armed police, United Nations officials, and women's rights activists when she attempted to return her home in Sewase, eastern Kono District. The support of foreign non-governmental agencies and armed police further provoked the local Poro Society. En route, her motorcade was attacked by rock-throwing Poro members. Sogbo-Tortu was forced to return to Freetown for her safety.

The Supreme Court of Sierra Leone ruled that tradition superseded the 2009 Chieftain Act in this case. Their decision was that because Sogbo-Tortu was not a member of the Poro Society, she did not fulfill the requirements to stand for the position of Paramount Chief. Her disqualification was upheld and one of her nephews was appointed the paramount chief.
