= Kombayendeh, Kono District =

- Location in Sierra Leone
- Coordinates: 8°30′N 10°52′W
- Country: Sierra Leone
- Province: Eastern Province
- District: Kono District
- Time zone: UTC-5 (GMT)

Kombayendeh is a village in Lei Chiefdom, Kono District in the Eastern Province of Sierra Leone. The major industry in the village is farming.

The inhabitants of Kombayendeh village are almost entirely from the Kono ethnic group. The Kono language is the primary language of communication in the village.
