= Tamba Songu M'briwa =

Sierra Leonean politician

Tamba Songu M'briwa (1910–1968) was a prominent Sierra Leonean politician and paramount chief from the Kono ethnic group, who formed one of the few political parties in Sierra Leone before independence.

== Early life and political career ==
Tamba Songu M'briwa was born in 1910 in the village of Jagbwema, Fiama Chiefdom, Kono District, in the Eastern Province of British Sierra Leone to parents from the Kono ethnic group.

When Sir Milton Margai, the leader of the Sierra Leone People's Party (SLPP) took power in 1961 as Sierra Leone's first prime minister Tamba Songu M'briwa was a prominent member of his government.
