= Yengema Secondary School =

Secondary education institution

Yengema Secondary School (YSS)
- Yengema, Kono District, Sierra Leone

Information
- Type: Government-assisted, Catholic Church sponsored secondary school
- Religious affiliation: Roman Catholic
- Established: 1964
- Gender: Boys and Girls
- Age: 13 to 20

Yengema Secondary School or YSS is a government-sponsored secondary school that serves the town of Yengema, in the Kono District, Sierra Leone.
