= The Delphian Jazz Orchestra =

The Delphian Jazz Orchestra performs the music of composer Justin Mullens.

The orchestra's eponymous album, released by Fresh Sound New Talent around 2004, was based on the story of Beowulf. The Delphian Jazz Orchestra performs music outside the typical parameters of a traditional big band in styles that fall anywhere from the influences of Duke Ellington to Igor Stravinsky and Frank Zappa.

== Discography ==
- Justin Mullens & The Delphian Jazz Orchestra (Fresh Sound New Talent, 2003)
- Tales of Pan & Eyes of Argus (Fresh Sound New Talent, 2009)
