= Victor Bockarie Foh =

Sierra Leonean politician

The Honourable Vice President Victor Bockarie Foh CRSL
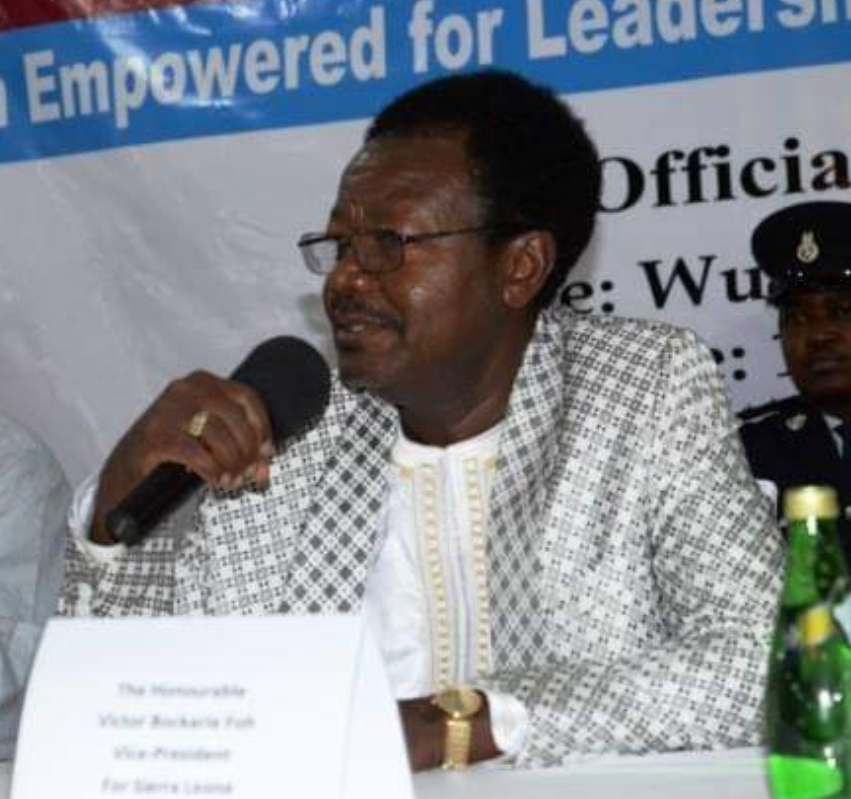
- Foh in 2015

Vice President of Sierra Leone
- In office 19 March 2015 – 4 April 2018
- President: Ernest Bai Koroma
- Preceded by: Samuel Sam-Sumana
- Succeeded by: Mohamed Juldeh Jalloh

Sierra Leone Ambassador to China
- In office 2012–2015
- Preceded by: Abubakarr Multi-Kamara
- Succeeded by: Alimamy Petito Koroma

Secretary-General of the All People's Congress
- In office 2002–2012
- Preceded by: Edward Turay
- Succeeded by: Osman Foday Yansaneh

Member of Parliament of Sierra Leone
- In office 1996–2002

District officer in the Sierra Leone public service
- In office 1970–1982

Personal details
- Born: 12 June 1946 (age 80) Jimmi, Bagbo Chiefdom, Bo District, British Sierra Leone
- Spouse: Jeneba Jabbie Foh (divorced) Jonta Mumie Foh (current)
- Children: 5
- Education: Fourah Bay College
- Profession: Economist

Victor Bockarie Foh CRSL (born 12 June 1946) is a Sierra Leonean politician who served as Vice President of Sierra Leone from 19 March 2015 to 4 April 2018. Foh replaced Samuel Sam-Sumana as vice president, after Sam-Sumana was sacked by President Ernest Bai Koroma.

A career politician, Victor Foh has been a member of the All People's Congress political party since 1970. He is a member of the APC Advisory Council, which is made up of the most senior members of the APC party. From 1970 to 1982, Victor Foh served as District Officer in Bonthe, Koinadugu, Bo, Kambia, Kenema and Kono District under the presidency of Siaka Stevens. Victor Foh has held prominent government positions under all three Sierra Leone"s president from the APC party of Siaka Stevens, Joseph Saidu Momoh, and Ernest Bai Koroma. In 1980, Victor Foh was awarded the National Honour of Member of the Order of the Rokel (M.R) award by President Siaka Stevens.

Foh was one of the founding members of the 1995 All People's Congress (APC) Constitution, and he served as the first Assistant National Secretary General of the APC under the 1995 party constitution. Victor Foh was the APC's vice presidential candidate, alongside APC presidential candidate Edward Turay, in the 1996 presidential election, in which the APC received only 5.4% of the votes. In 1996 Foh was elected to a seat in Parliament. From 2002 to 2012, Foh served as Secretary General of the APC. In 2012, Foh became Sierra Leone's Ambassador to China, a position he held until he was appointed as Vice President in March 2015.

Foh is a 1969 graduate of Fourah Bay College with a B.A. in Economics. Foh is an ethnic Mende and a native of Bo District in Southern Sierra Leone.

== Early life and education ==
Victor Bockarie Foh was born on June 12, 1946, the son of the Paramount Chief in Jimmi, Bagbo Chiefdom, Bo District in the Southern Province of Sierra Leone. Foh was born to parents of the Mende ethnic group. Foh was born to Christian parents in Bo District, and a Christian himself. Foh attended the Jimmi Bagbo primary school in Jimmi, Bo District. He attended the Bo Government secondary school (commonly known as Bo School) in Bo. Foh graduated from Fourah Bay College in 1969 with a B.A. in economics. From 1969 to 1970, Foh taught economics and government study at the Ahmadiyya Islamic Secondary School in Freetown.

== Political career ==
An experienced career politician, Victor Foh has been a loyal member of the All People's Congress political party since 1970. From 1970 to 1982, Victor Foh served as District Officer in Bonthe, Koinadugu, Bo, Kambia, Kenema and Kono District. Victor Foh has held government positions under all three APC presidents of Sierra Leone: Siaka Stevens, Joseph Saidu Momoh and Ernest Bai Koroma.

Foh was one of the principal writers of the 5 December 1995 All People's Congress Constitution; and he served as the first Assistant National Secretary General of the APC.

Victor Foh was the APC vice presidential candidate, along with APC presidential candidate Edward Turay, in the 1996 presidential election, in which the APC received only 5.4% of the votes. In 1996 Foh was elected to a seat in Parliament. From 2002 to 2012, Foh served as Secretary-General of the APC, and from 2012 to 2015, he was Sierra Leone's Ambassador to China.

In 2014, Foh was recognized for his distinguished and dedicated service to the state in the field of politics by the President Ernest Bai Koroma who made him a Commander of the Order of the Republic (CRSL).

On March 19, 2015, Victor Foh was sworn in as Vice President of Sierra Leone by President Ernest Bai Koroma, who appointed him to the position. Foh's sworn in ceremony was held at State House in the capital Freetown and was attended by many senior government officials. Victor Foh replaced Samuel Sam-Sumana as vice president, after he was dismissed by Koroma.

== Personal life ==
Victor Foh is an ethnic Mende and a native of Bo District in Southern Sierra Leone. Foh is a fluent speaker of the Mende language. Victor Foh is a Christian. Foh was previously married to Jeneba Jabbie Foh, daughter of the late West African mining magnate Al Haji Mohamed Baimba Jabbie. Foh was also married to Khadijah Khan of Jimmi, and they had one son, Victor B. Foh. Victor Foh is currently married to Jonta Mumie Foh and has five adult children.
