= Israeli song =

Israeli Song may refer to:

- Israeli Song (album), an Eli Degibri recording
- Music of Israel
