= Tombodu =

- Location in Sierra Leone
- Coordinates: 8°08′N 10°37′W
- Country: Sierra Leone
- Province: Eastern Province
- District: Kono District
- Time zone: UTC-5 (GMT)

Tombodu is a relatively small provincial town - the third largest town in Kono District in the Eastern Province, Sierra Leone. The town had a population of less than 3000 in the 2004 census. Tombodu was RUF stronghold during the Sierra Leone civil war. The majority of the residents in the town are from the Kono ethnic group. The town is the birthplace of Johnny Paul Koroma, the former leader of the Armed Forces Revolutionary Council (AFRC) military junta of Sierra Leone.

The town has two primary schools and one secondary school. It has two nice hills: one in the east and another in the west of the town. Tombodu was the site of a major massacre in 1998 during the Sierra Leone Civil war. People were beheaded or killed in other ways and their bodies thrown into a pit called "Savage Pit" after the name of the AFRC commando who headed the massacre. There is a memorial in the town containing the bones of people locked in a house and burned to death.
