= Foindu =

- Location in Sierra Leone
- Coordinates: 8°28′N 10°22′W
- Country: Sierra Leone
- Province: Eastern Province
- District: Kono District
- Time zone: UTC-5 (GMT)

Foindu is a village in Kono District in the Eastern Province of Sierra Leone. Virtually every home in the village was looted and burned during the Sierra Leone civil war.
