= Samuel Sam-Sumana =

Sierra Leone politician

The Honourable Vice President Alhaji Samuel Sam-Sumana
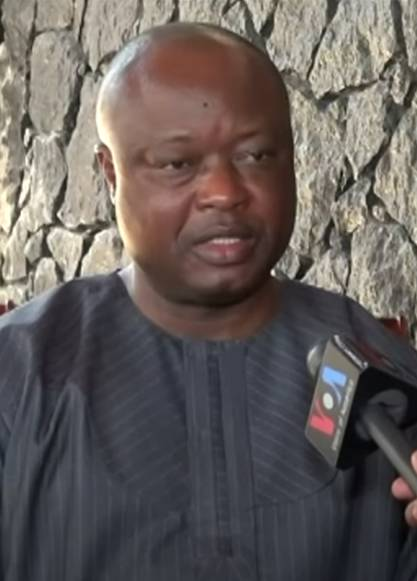
- Sam-Sumana in 2018

Vice President of Sierra Leone
- In office September 17, 2007 – March 17, 2015
- President: Ernest Bai Koroma
- Preceded by: Solomon Berewa
- Succeeded by: Victor Bockarie Foh

Personal details
- Born: April 17, 1962 (age 64) Koidu Town, Kono District, Sierra Leone
- Party: C4C APC (until 2015)
- Spouse: Haja Khadija Sam-Sumana
- Children: 3
- Education: Metropolitan State University, Minneapolis – Saint Paul, Minnesota, United States
- Profession: Businessman, information systems technician

Alhaji Samuel Sam-Sumana (born April 17, 1962) is a Sierra Leonean politician who was the Vice President of Sierra Leone from September 17, 2007, to March 17, 2015. Sam-Sumana stood as the vice-presidential candidate of the All People's Congress (APC) in the 2007 presidential election, alongside presidential candidate Ernest Bai Koroma. The APC ticket defeated the Sierra Leone People's Party (SLPP) presidential candidate Solomon Berewa and vice presidential candidate Momodou Koroma. Sam-Sumana took office as vice president on September 17, 2007.

On March 17, 2015, President Koroma sacked Sam-Sumana as vice president on the grounds that he had abandoned his position and sought asylum in the United States Embassy in Freetown, and for not belonging to a political party although it was reported by several local and international media that Sam-Sumana fled his residence fearing for his life, before soldiers had surrounded his house and disarmed his security team. The Sierra Leone government said Sam-Sumana was not in any danger and that soldiers only came to Sam-Sumana's house to rotate his security team. President Ernest Bai Koroma sacked Sam-Sumana for also not belonging to a political party, though he was expelled from the APC party by the National Advisory Council of the All People's Congress on March 6, 2015. Sam-Sumana said his sacking by president Ernest Bai Koroma was unconstitutional and has appealed to the Sierra Leone Supreme Court.

The sacking of Sam-Sumana was described as unconstitutional by the main opposition Sierra Leone People's Party (SLPP), the Sierra Leone Labour Congress, which represent the country's trade union, and by the Sierra Leone Bar Association, which is made up of many of the country's lawyers.

The APC National Advisory Council expelled Sam-Sumana on accusations of Sam-Sumana allegedly giving false information about his master's degree certificate; he was accused of allegedly instigating political violence in Kono District; was accused of allegedly trying to form a breakaway faction of a new political party; and was also accused of allegedly giving false information about his religion. Sam-Sumana denied all the allegations against him and has appealed his sacking as vice president. Sam-Sumana denied all the allegations against him; and described them as completely wrong and baseless.

Sam-Sumana served as the managing director of the United Diamond Mining Company based in Koidu Town, Kono District, Sierra Leone. He also served as the regional manager for C-12 International, a Texas based mining company engaged in diamond production in Sierra Leone, Guinea and Liberia.

Sam-Sumana is a devout Muslim and a member of the Kono ethnic group. Sam-Sumana is married to Khadija Sam-Sumana. The couple resided in Minnesota in the United States, but returned to Freetown in 2007 when Sam-Sumana was named as running mate by opposition leader Ernest Bai Koroma on the ticket of the All People's Congress (APC).

Sam Sumana led a breakaway faction of the APC known as Coalition for Change (C4C) and contested in the 2018 elections winning 8 Parliamentary seats and several council seats in the strategic Kono district. In a chaotic turn of events in the former ruling APC party, the arrest and harassment of former APC party and government officials, many see Samuel Sam Sumana as the game changer with the character and appeal to bring back the party into power in 2023.

== Early life ==
Sahr Samuel Tamba Sidique Sam-Sumana was born on April 17, 1962, at the Koidu Government Hospital in Koidu Town, Kono District in the Eastern Province of Sierra Leone. Sam-Sumana is the fourth son of his father, Sahr Samuel Sam-Sumana, a prominent Kono Chief who was a member of the All People's Congress party and a close friend of President Siaka Stevens. Sam-Sumana's mother is Haja Sia Hawa Sam-Sumana. Sam-Sumana is a devout Muslim and a member of the Kono ethnic group.

Sam-Sumana attended the Koidu Primary school in Koidu Town and then proceeded to the Jaiama Muslim Secondary School in the town of Jaiama, just outside Koidu Town in Kono District. He also attended the Ahmadiyya Muslim secondary school in Freetown.

== Career and education ==
Sam-Sumana has a Bachelor of Science (BSC) in management information systems from the Metropolitan State University in Minneapolis – Saint Paul, Minnesota, United States. He also has a diploma in diamond rough grading, sorting and polishing from the America Institution of Diamond Cutting and Polishing, in Deerfield Beach, Florida, United States, and a diploma in computer network support from Knollwood Computer and Business School in St Louis Park, Minnesota. While in the United States, Sam-Sumana had worked as a systems officer for the Prudential Financial Group. He was employed as a network support specialist for Allina Health in the United States.

Sam-Sumana had served as the managing director of the United Diamond Mining Company based in Koidu Town, Kono District, Sierra Leone. He also served as the regional manager for C-12 International, a Texas based mining company engaged in diamond production in Sierra Leone, Guinea and Liberia.

== Political career ==
Sam-Sumana was surprisingly selected by Sierra Leone's main opposition leader Ernest Bai Koroma as his running-mate for the 2007 presidential election. Sam-Sumana stood as the vice-presidential candidate of the All People's Congress (APC) in the 2007 election, alongside Koroma; the APC ticket defeated the Sierra Leone People's Party (SLPP) presidential candidate Solomon Berewa and vice presidential candidate Momodou Koroma. Sam-Sumana took office as vice president on September 17, 2007.

== Bribery allegations ==
On November 23, 2011, an Al Jazeera report which was broadcast globally and was produced by Sierra Leonean journalist Sorious Samura, provided an allegation implicating Vice President Sumana and business associates Alex Mansaray and Momoh Konte in a corrupt timber license deal. This was locally referred to as the Timbergate scandal. Sumana later reportedly admitted to Al Jazeera that Mansaray and Konte were well known to him, but that he knew nothing about their collection of cash on his behalf. Sumanas supporters attempted to discredit the allegations through the state media and other friendly media.

== Reforms ==
Sam Sumana led a number of reforms in the social services and economic sectors. He changed the punitive system from Prisons to Correctional centers. He led a radical change in the conduct of business by pushing for reforms in business registration processes. He constantly pushed for a reengineering of the settled zones to cater for climate change and to prevent natural disasters, through his push for a comprehensive land reform. He has been a key advocate for mining reforms that carefully addresses environmental concerns and responsibility.

== Removal as vice-president ==
On March 17, 2015, Sierra Leone's President Ernest Bai Koroma sacked Sam-Sumana as vice president on the ground that he had abandoned his position to seek an asylum in the United States Embassy in Freetown, and for not belonging to a political party as stated in the constitution. Though it was reported that Sam-Sumana fled his residence fearing for his life, before soldiers had surrounded his house and disarmed his security team. The Sierra Leone government said Sam-Sumana was not in any danger and that soldiers only came to Sam-Sumana's house to rotate his security team. President Ernest Bai Koroma sacked Sam-Sumana for also not belonging to a political party, as stated in the constitution, though he was expelled from the APC party by the National Advisory Council of the All People's Congress.

On March 6, 2015, Sam-Sumana was expelled from the ruling All People's Congress party by the APC's National Advisory Council on the basis of several charges against him. The National Advisory Council accused Sam-Sumana of giving false information about his master's degree certificate; he was accused of instigating political violence in Kono District; he was accused of trying to form a breakaway faction of a new political party; and was also wrongly accused of giving false information about his religious background. The charges were announced by APC Secretary-General Osman Foday Yansaneh at the party's headquarters in Freetown. After the expulsion, Sam-Sumana fled his home on March 14, 2015, and went to the American embassy in Freetown, where he asked for asylum.

In a turn of events in the 2018 elections, the same Osman Foday Yansaneh came on live TV to apologize to Sam Sumana that his illegal dismissal from the party was void and the APC has reinstated him into the party.

== Awards and global recognitions ==
H.E Sam Sam Sumana has received a number of Global Awards and recognitions for his unique role in advocating for Peace and transformative governance in Africa. On August 10, 2018, he was appointed to the Global Advisory Council of the HWPL and WARP. He and other Former Heads of States including Former President of mozammbque H.E Joaquim Chissano were present to discuss how peace can be sustainably achieved in Africa.

In 2017, he received the prestigious peace award given by the Women's Situation room in Sierra Leone. The award plaque presentation was made His Excellency John Dramani Mahama, Former President of Ghana. The WSR is a peacebuilding initiative that empowers women to be the leading force for democratic and peaceful elections. The concept was first introduced by Yvette Chesson-Wureh, coordinator for the Liberia-based Angie Brooks International Centre (ABIC), a non-governmental organisation working on women's empowerment. The WSR is an initiative that mobilises, harnesses and taps into the expertise and experiences of women to act to mitigate potential conflict, leading to violence that could emerge before, during and after elections. It empowers women and youth to play an active and direct role in peace and security efforts, and to engage in peace processes and conflict prevention mechanisms in accordance with UNSC resolutions 1325 and 1820. The initiative was first used during the 2011 elections in Liberia, and has since been successfully replicated in Kenya (2013), Senegal (2012), Sierra Leone (2012), Nigeria (2014) and Uganda (2016), among other countries. There were also plans to use it in Burkina Faso, Côte d'Ivoire and Togo. The operational approach of the WSR is expected to differ in individual countries, allowing for flexibility to adapt to local conditions and dynamics.

He won the Man of the year by 2017 in the United States of America by ICHANGE NATIONS.

Samuel Sam Sumana was awarded the African Star Award for Leadership by the ECOWAS Youth Council for outstanding boldness in defence of good governance, reform and rule of law.

Political offices
Preceded by Solomon Berewa	Vice President of Sierra Leone; 2007–2015	Succeeded by Victor Bockarie Foh
