= Yardu Sando =

Village in Kono District, in the Eastern Province of Sierra Leone

Yardu Sando is a village in Kono District, in the Eastern Province of Sierra Leone.

According to the first indictment issued by the Special Court for Sierra Leone in March 2003, the "Revolutionary United Front Case," most of the buildings in the village were looted and burned in 1998 during months of widespread destruction by members of Armed Forces Revolutionary Council and Revolutionary United Front.
