= Yengema =

Yengema, Sierra Leone
- Location in Sierra Leone
- Coordinates: 8°37′N 11°10′W
- Country: Sierra Leone
- Province: Eastern Province
- District: Kono District
- Chiefdom: Nimikoro Chiefdom

Population
  - Total: 13,358
- Time zone: UTC-5 (GMT)

Yengema is a town in the Nimikoro Chiefdom of Kono District in the Eastern Province of Sierra Leone, lying approximately 6 miles (9.7 km) west of Koidu Town (the largest city in Kono District), and about 142 miles (229 km) east of Freetown. The major industries in and around Yengema are diamond mining and agriculture. The town is home to Yengema Airport, the main airfield serving Kono District. A 2012 estimate of Yengema population was 13,358 people.

The population of Yengema is ethnically diverse, though the majority of its residents are ethnic Mandingo and ethnic Kono. The primary language of communication in Yengema is the Krio language, which is widely spoken in the town.

Yengema is a predominantly Muslim town, though with a significant Christian minority population.

Yengema is home to the Yengema Secondary School (commonly known as YSS), which was among the most prominent secondary schools in Sierra Leone.

Yengema is known for its archaeological site called Yengema Cave which was discovered by American anthropologist Carleton Stevens Coon in 1965.

Before the Sierra Leone Civil War, Yengema was one of the most populous cities in Eastern Sierra Leone. During the civil war, Yengema was heavily damaged and constantly fought over due to the rich diamond reserves in the area. This forced many of the residents to flee the city.

== Religion ==
The majority of the population of Yengema are Muslims at about 70%; Christianity accounts for a large minority of the town population at about 29%. Muslim and Christian people in the town live peacefully together. Religious violence in the city is extremely rare.

== Sport ==
Like the rest of Sierra Leone, football is the most popular sport in the town of Yengema. The town does not have a major football club; however, the Diamond Stars of Kono represent Yengema and the rest of the Kono District in the Sierra Leone National Premier League, the top football league in the country.

== Notable people from Yengema ==
- Sia Koroma, First lady of Sierra Leone

== Bibliography ==
- Carleton S. Coon (1968). Yengema Cave Report. Philadelphia: University Museum (University of Pennsylvania).
