= Sewafe =

Sewafe, Kono District
- Location in Sierra Leone
- Coordinates: 8°37′N 11°10′W
- Country: Sierra Leone
- Province: Eastern Province
- District: Kono District

Population ((2009 estimate))
  - Total: 5,249
- Time zone: UTC-5 (GMT)

Sewafe is a diamond-mining town in Kono District in the Eastern Province of Sierra Leone. The town is 30 miles west of Koidu Town (the largest city in Kono District) and about 220 miles east of Freetown, on the highway linking Koidu Town to Kenema. Sewafe had an estimated population of 5,249 in 2009. The town has a government hospital and two police stations run by the Sierra Leone Police Force.

== Ethnicity ==
The population of Sewafe is almost entirely part of the Kono ethnic group. Both the Kono language and the Krio language are widely spoken.

== Education ==
The town has four primary schools, two secondary schools, a police station. Like in all parts of Sierra Leone, primary education in the town is free and compulsory.
