= Motema =

Motema, Kono District
- Location in Sierra Leone
- Coordinates: 8°37′N 11°10′W
- Country: Sierra Leone
- Province: Eastern Province
- District: Kono District
- Chiefdom: Nimikoro Chiefdom

Population (2009)
  - Total: 30,452
- Time zone: UTC-5 (GMT)

Motema is the second most populous town in Kono District in the Eastern Province of Sierra Leone. The town is a suburb of, and located immediately outside of, Koidu Town, the largest city in Kono District. Motema has a population of 30,452 and lies about 270 miles east of Freetown.

The town is home to one of the largest police stations in Sierra Leone. The primary language of communication in the town is the Krio language.

== Diamond development ==
The Town is home to many foreign diamonder employees as well as middle class Sierra Leonean diamond exporters.

== Ethnicity and Religion ==
The population of Motema is ethnically diverse, with no ethnic group forming the majority of the population. Muslims account about 60% of the population and Christians at about 40%. Religious violence in the city is extremely rare.

Popular religious centres are:

1. The Masjid Taqwa (commonly referred to as Big Mosque or Market Mosque) which is located next to central market.
2. Our Lady of Mercy Catholic Church located along the Masingbi Road within the Fulah Town section of the town.

== Town Chief ==
The current town chief is Sahr Bundor. Chief Bundor is from the Kono ethnic group. He was elected to the position after defeating the late Tamba James.

== Primary schools ==
The prominent primary schools are the Ahmadiyya, Roman Catholic and United Methodist Church.

== Sport ==
Like the rest of Sierra Leone, football is the most popular sport in the town of Motema. The town does not have a major football club; however, the Diamond Stars of Kono represent Motema and the rest of the Kono District in the Sierra Leone National Premier League, the top football league in the country.

In 1992 Diamond Stars FC of Kono created Sierra Leonean football history after becoming the first team from outside the capital Freetown to win the title.
