= Poro =

Men's secret society in West Africa

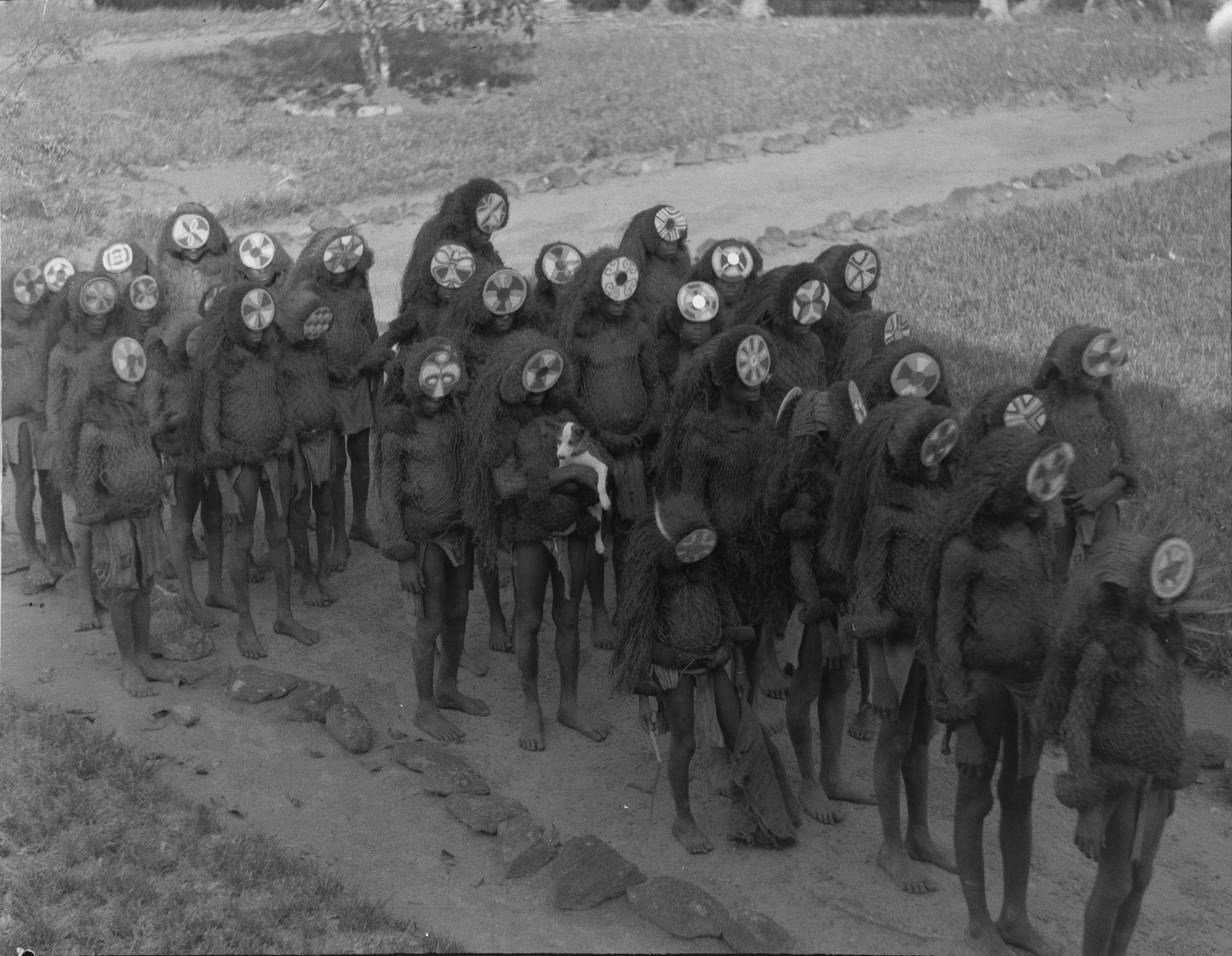
Sjoerd Hofstra: Boys returning from their initiation in the Poro. Panguma, Sierra Leone, 1936

The Poro, or Purrah or Purroh, is a men's secret society in Sierra Leone, Liberia, Guinea, and the Ivory Coast, introduced by the Mane people (the Mande Elites leading large-scale migrations from the Mali Empire into the southern coastal areas). It is sometimes referred to as a hunting society and only men are admitted to its ranks. The female counterpart of the Poro society is the Sande society.

== Structure ==
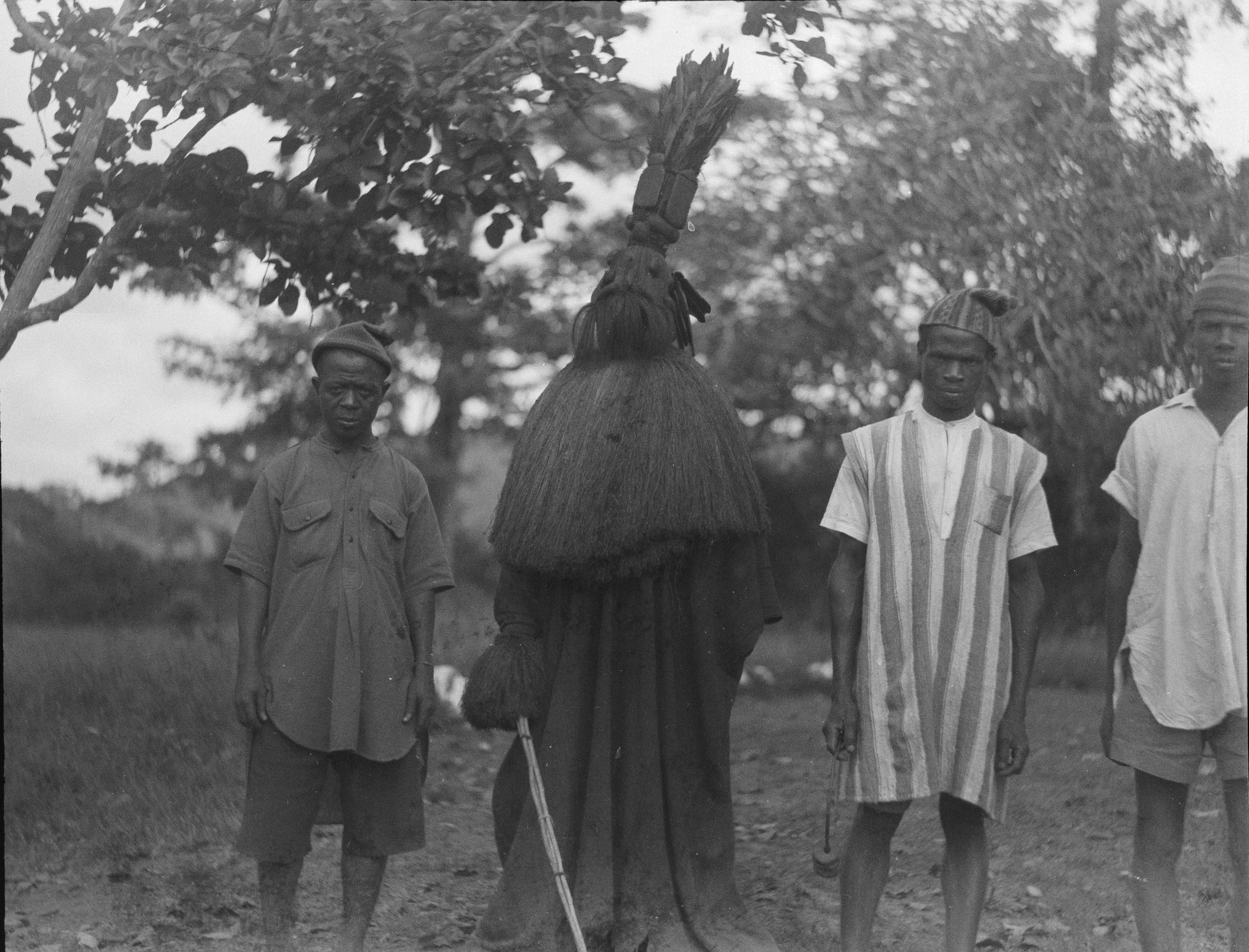
Sjoerd Hofstra: A "falui" masker, a one-armed warrior spirit. Panguma, Sierra Leone, 1936

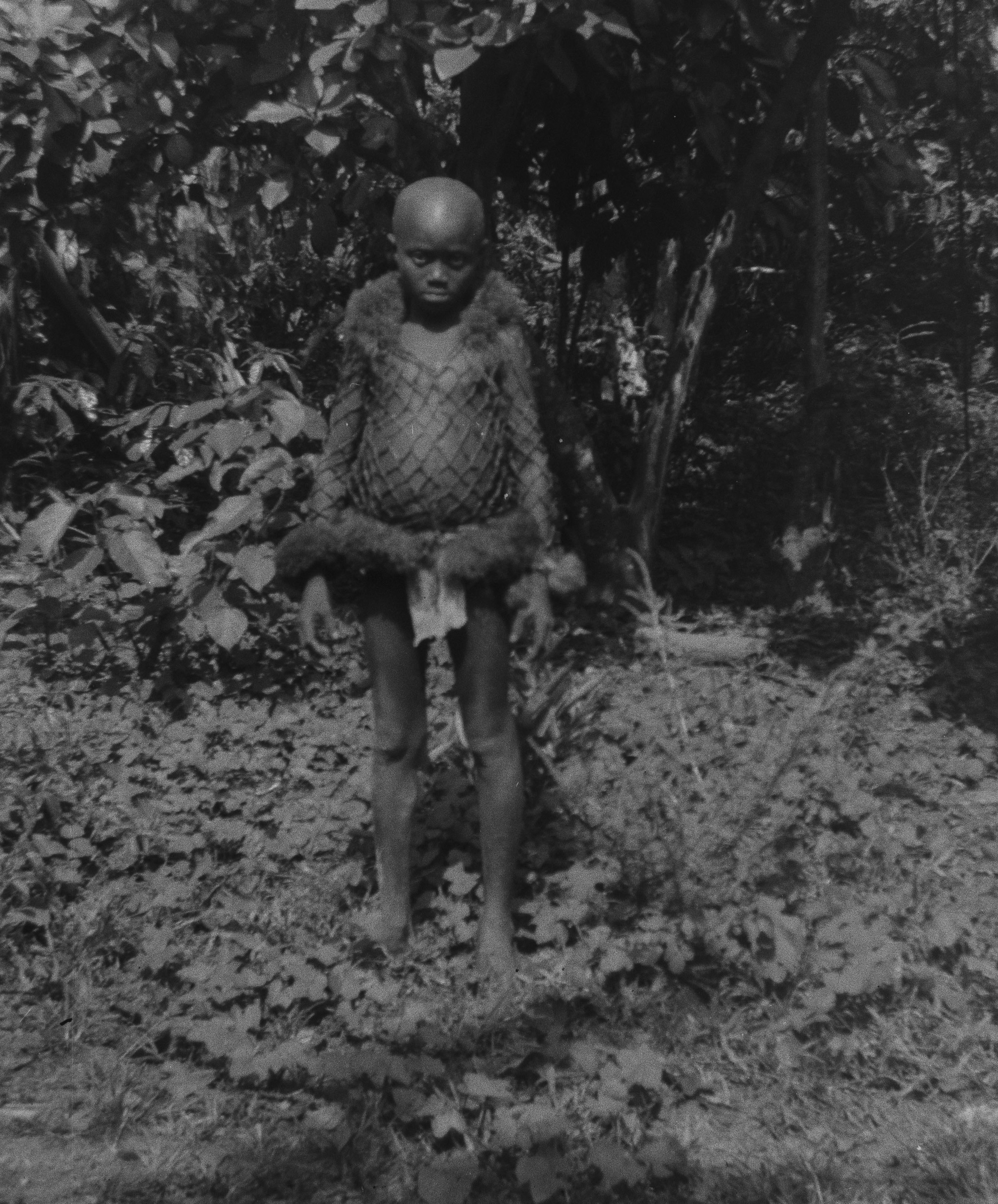
Sjoerd Hofstra: A boy in Poro outfit. Panguma, Sierra Leone, 1936

The Poro society was part of the culture introduced by Mane people, migrants to the region as early as 1000 AD.

Two affiliated and secret associations exist in Sierra Leone, the Yassi and the Bundu. The first is nominally reserved for women, but members of the Poro are admitted to certain ceremonies. All the female members of the Yassi must be also members of the Bundu, which is strictly reserved to women. In Liberia, the female equivalent of the Poro is the Sande society.

Of the three, the Poro is by far the most important. The entire native population is governed by its code of laws. It primarily represents a type of fraternal society to which even infants are temporarily admitted. The ceremony for them consists of carrying them into the Poro bush and out again.

There are also religious and civil aspects of the Poro. Under the former, boys join it at puberty in a rite of passage. Under its civil aspects, the society serves as a kind of native governing body, making laws, deciding on war and peace, etc.

== Cultural context ==
In Culture and Customs of Liberia (2006) by Ayodeji Olukoju, the place of the Poro society in Liberian life is examined. "Liberian religious culture is characterised by a predisposition towards secrecy (encapsulated in the concept of ifa mo - "do not speak it") and an ingrained belief in the intervention of mysterious forces in human affairs". "Both elite and non-elite Liberians usually attribute events to the activities of secret powers and forces."

"Beliefs include the conviction that there are deep and hidden things about an individual that only diviners, priests, and other qualified persons can unravel. This presupposes that whatever exists or happens in the physical realm has foundations in the spirit world".

== Social function ==
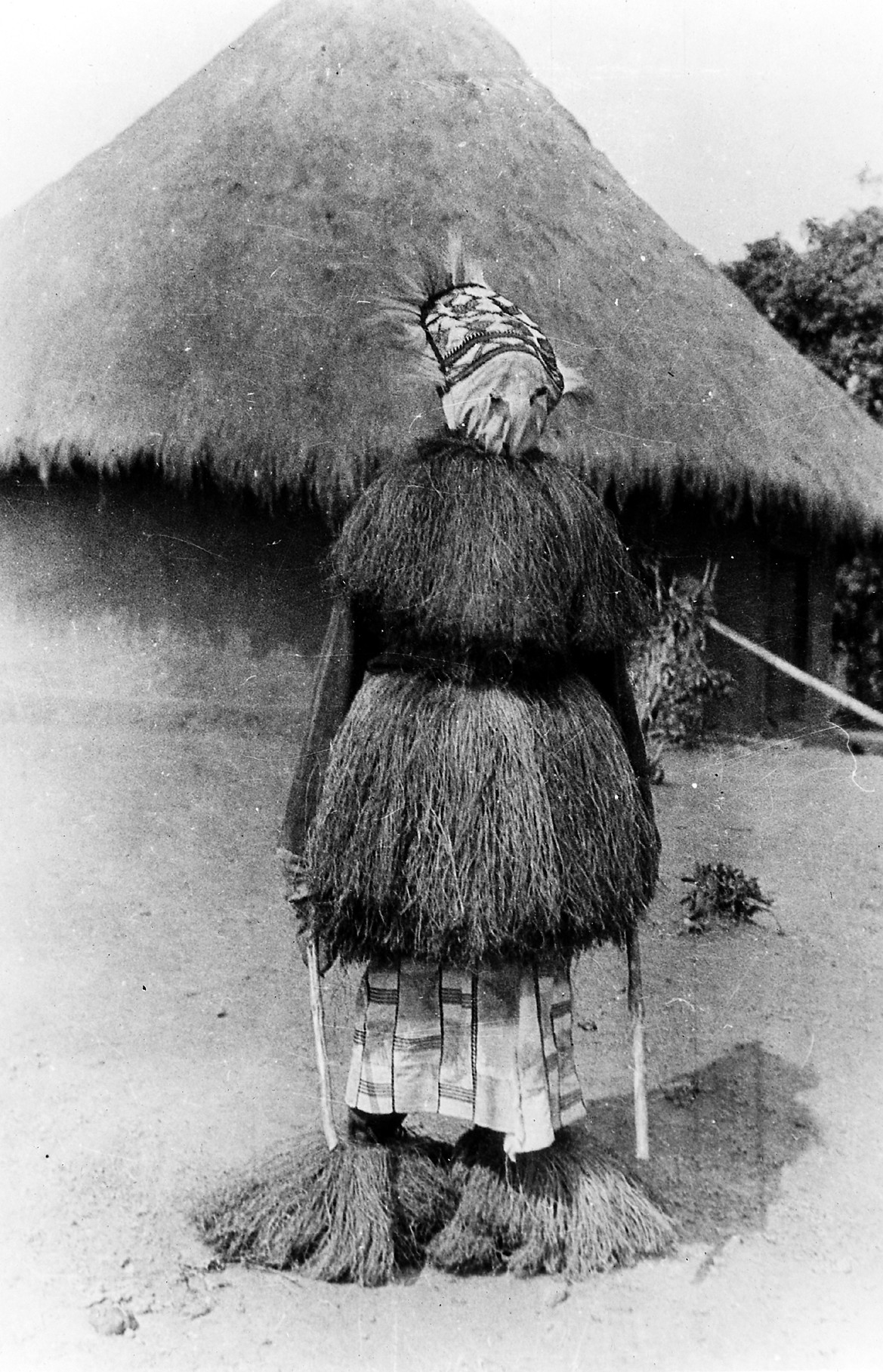
Gustav Bolinder: A masked Poro dancer. No date, 1930–1931?

One of the social functions of secret societies like the Poro and Sande is to deter antisocial behavior or beliefs. Poro elders will determine cases of alleged witchcraft in the community.

== Practices ==
The Poro society has its own special rituals, language, ancient Saharan script, tattooing, and symbols. Details are scarce, due to an oath of secrecy. However, versions and iterations of this have been made public e.g. Vai Script, Mende Script, and Kpelle syllabary. Those responsible for the public release of these scripts have claimed receipt of them through dreams when engaging with Europeans in the 19th and 20th century CE. This was done to conceal the origin of these scripts from European Colonisers.

=== Meetings ===
The Poro society usually meets in the dry season, between the months of October and May. The rendezvous is in the bush, at an enclosure, separated into apartments by mats and roofed only by the overhanging trees, serving as a club-house. There are three grades, the first for Chiefs and Rulers (Paramount chief), known as the "big men", the second for Priests and the third for the crowd. The ceremonies of the Poro are presided over by the Poro devil, a man in fetish dress, who addresses the meeting through a long tube of wood.

The wearing of wooden masks in Poro society masquerades is a representation of the spirit world of benign and malevolent spirits.

"The ceremonies of the Purrah are presided over by the Poro devil, a man in fetish dress, who addresses the meeting through a long tube of wood, known as a bull-roarer (voice distorter which delivers a bloodcurdling stream of sounds, and is made from a tube with holes cut into it over which discs of membrane from the egg sacks of a particular spider are spread over)."

The Liberian Poro is little different when it comes to ceremonies.

If a ceremony has women, children and non-members taking part, the devil stays out. The Gbetoo is the only "fetish dressed up with long tube of wood" that can be seen. The poro devil is invisible even to most members.

=== Taboo ===
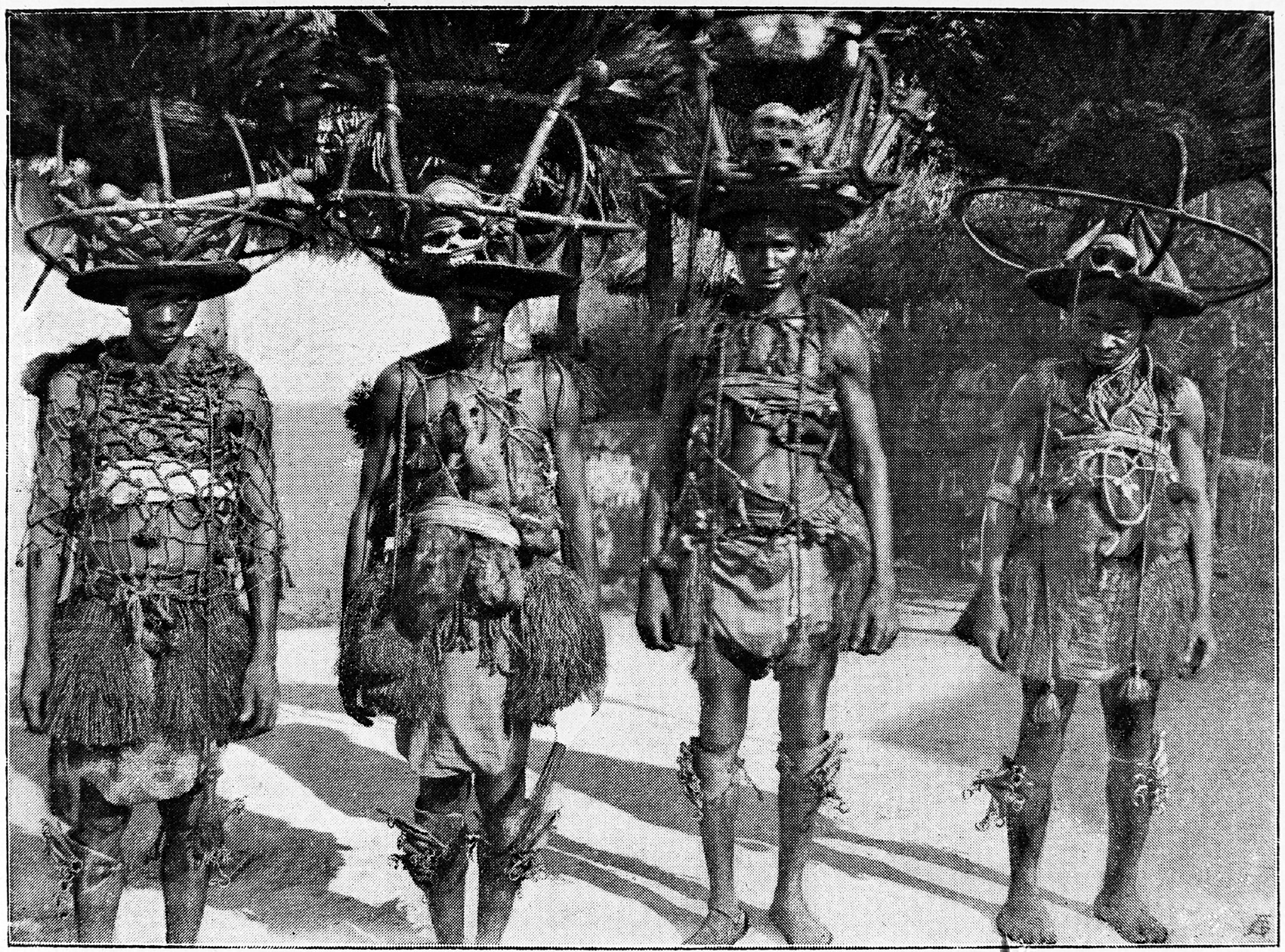
A group of Jasso men. Poro society members. Note the dead animals symbolically attached to the second man, and the human skulls on their helmets. No date.

The Poro can place its taboo on anything or anybody. As no member would defy its order, much trouble has been caused where the taboo has been laid upon crops. In 1897 the British local government was compelled to pass a special ordinance forbidding the imposition of the taboo on all indigenous products.

=== Other activities ===
In 2009, rock-throwing Poro members protested the selection of Elizabeth Simbiwa Sogbo-Tortu as the first female chief of the Nimiyama Chiefdom in eastern Sierra Leone. They barred her from taking office.

== Activity by country ==
=== Liberia ===
During his rule, Charles Taylor is reported to have coopted the Poro Society, which helped him project an aura of mystery and invincibility.

== See also ==
- Ojeh Society
- Sande society
- Leopard Society
- Crocodile Society
- Secret society

== Additional reading ==
- Tim Butcher. Chasing the Devil - The Search for Africa's Fighting Spirit. Chatto & Windus, 2010. ISBN 0701183608
- P. Jan Vandenhoute. "Poro and Mask : A Few Comments on 'Masks as agents of social control in Northeast Liberia' by Dr. G.W. Harley." Working Papers in Ethnic Art, 4. State University of Ghent, 1989.
