= Sahr Randolf Fillie-Faboe =

Sahr Randolf Fillie-Faboe (born in Kono District, Sierra Leone) is a Sierra Leonean politician and diplomat. He is a former Sierra Leone's Ambassador to Liberia and a former member of parliament of Sierra Leone.

Fillie-Faboe is one of the most respected politician among the Kono people, the ethnic group he belongs to. On Sierra Leone's independence day on April 27, 2007, Fillie-Faboe was given the award of National Honours and Decorations by president Ahmad Tejan Kabbah at the state house in Freetown. The award was given in recognition of his distinguished service to the nation in the fields of diplomacy and politics. He had served as Ambassador, Minister of State, Ministry of Foreign Affairs and now as Resident Minister in the Eastern Province, which post he has held for the last seven years.

Fillie-Faboe currently resides in Koidu Town.
