= Gerihun =

- Town
- Location within Sierra Leone
- Coordinates: 7°25′15″N 11°40′43″W
- Country: Sierra Leone
- Province: Southern Province
- District: Bo District

Gerihun is a small town in Bo District in southern Sierra Leone. In late April 1996, an attack on the town led its residents and the more than 20,000 inhabitants of a displaced camp in the vicinity to flee to Bo.

== Notable people ==
- Albert Joe Demby (1934-2021)
