= Nimiyama Chiefdom =

Nimiyama Chiefdom Niminyama Chiefdom
- Chiefdom
- Country: Sierra Leone
- Province: Eastern Province
- District: Kono District
- Capital: Sewafe
- Time zone: UTC+0 (GMT)

Nimiyama Chiefdom or Niminyama Chiefdom is a chiefdom in Kono District of Sierra Leone. Its capital is Sewafe.
