= Port Loko Teacher's College =

College in Sierra Leone

- Type: Public
- Established: 1968
- Students: 2,624
- Location: Port Loko, Sierra Leone
- Campus: Port Loko campus
- Affiliations: University of Sierra Leone

Port Loko Teacher's College is a college located in Port Loko, Sierra Leone. It was founded in 1968. The college trains prospective teachers for the primary and junior secondary school levels (form 1–3). At the end of the program, candidates qualify for the Teachers Certificate (TC) and the Higher Teachers Certificate (HTC). The college offers programmes in English studies, social studies, environmental science, agriculture and Mathematics education. The school campus has a volleyball court, a table tennis court, a football field and a Swimming pool.

== Current programmes ==
- School of Community Health Services
- School of Social Sciences
- School of Agriculture
- School of Environmental Sciences
- School of Technology
- School of Business Management
- School of Social Studies
