= Komba Mondeh =

Sierra Leonean general (1966–2023)

Deputy Chairman of the National Provisional Ruling Council
- In office 16 January 1996 – 29 March 1996
- Head of State: Julius Maada Bio
- Preceded by: Julius Maada Bio
- Succeeded by: Albert Joe Demby (Note: as vice president)

Personal details
- Born: Komba Sylvester Mansa-Musa Mondeh; 31 October 1966 Njala, Sierra Leone
- Died: January 2023 (aged 56)
- Party: Non
- Spouse: Rashida Mondeh
- Education: Njala University; University of Ibadan
- Profession: Military officer
- Awards: Best Foreign Student – National War College, Nigeria
- Religion: Islam

Military service
- Allegiance: Sierra Leone
- Branch/service: Sierra Leone Army
- Years of service: 1986–2013
- Rank: Brigadier General
- Battles/wars: Sierra Leone Civil War; First Liberian Civil War

Komba Sylvester Mansa-Musa Mondeh (31 October 1966 – January 2023) was a top-ranking officer in the Sierra Leonean army. Mondeh was one of six young soldiers in the Sierra Leonean Army that ousted president Joseph Saidu Momoh led All People's Congress (APC) government on 29 April 1992. He served as the deputy head of state of Sierra Leone in 1996, under Brigadier Julius Maada Bio of the NPRC.

He operated as the Sector Commander Sector West UNAMID Darfur (Sudan) until he was forced into retirement in June 2013.

== Early life ==
Mondeh was born in the Njala University Community. He was educated at the Albert Academy School in Freetown. He then attended the Njala University College in Sierra Leone.

== Military career ==
Mondeh was commissioned into the Sierra Leone Army in 1991 as a Second Lieutenant. During Sierra Leone's 10-year civil war, he helped plan and execute the recapture of Pendembu, Kailahun, Kono, Mile 38, Nomo Fayama and Sierra Rutile. He was then sent on a Senior Division Staff Course in Nigeria in July 1996, and was invited to attend the Nigerian War College the following year, where in addition to his military qualification, he earned a master's degree in Strategic Studies. Mondeh was also awarded the 'Best International Student'. He pursued a master's degree program in Strategic Studies at the University of Ibadan, Nigeria between September 1998 and July 1999.

At the rank of Colonel in May 1999, General Mondeh was appointed Defence Adviser to the Federal Republic of Nigeria, where he served for over four years. On his return from Nigeria in October 2003, he was appointed Commander of the 5 Infantry Brigade in Gondama, BO district, and was promoted to the role of Assistant Chief of Defence Staff for Personnel and Training at the Ministry of Defence in December 2005. Mondeh was promoted to the rank of Brigadier General in July 2007. Mondeh became Assistant Chief of Defence Staff for Operations and Plans in October 2008; in this role he supervised all land, sea and air operations carried out by the Republic of Sierra Leone Armed Forces, including supervising military intelligence, communications and information systems, and peace support operations.

=== Commands held ===
- Commander Bravo Company: Tiger battalion- Daru
- Commander Alpha Company LEOBATT3 ECOMOG
- Task Force Commander – RSLMF Operation Ranger Storm
- Commander 5 Infantry Brigade
- Chief of Staff - Sierra Leone Army
- Commander Sector South UNAMID Nyala Darfur (Sudan)
- Acting Force Commander UNAMID Nyala Darfur (Sudan)
- Commander Sector West UNAMID El-Geneina Darfur (Sudan)

=== Staff appointments held ===
- Intelligence officer LEOBATT3 ECOMOG
- Director of Training and Operations – Ministry of Defence
- Defence Adviser to Nigeria
- Assistant Chief of Defence Staff for Personnel & Training – MoD
- Assistant Chief of Defence Staff for Operations & Plans – MoD

=== State appointments ===
- Secretary of State Marine Resources – Government Sierra Leone
- Under Secretary of State Defence – Government of Sierra Leone

=== Wars ===
- The Sierra Leone Rebel War
- The Liberia Rebel War

=== Awards ===
- Gallantry Medal
- Best Foreign Student- National War College, Nigeria

=== Retirement ===
Mondeh was one of 21 high-ranking officers, including four Brigadier-Generals, controversially forced into retirement in June 2013. Mondeh was nine years under the compulsory retirement age, and his ousting was allegedly a result of his participation in the 1992 coup.

=== Styles and honours ===
- Officer Cadet Komba Sylvester Mansa-Musa Mondeh (1991– through various other ranks- 1996)
- Colonel Komba Sylvester Mansa-Musa Mondeh (1996–2007)
- Brigadier General Sylvester Mansa-Musa Mondeh psc, fwc, MSc (2007–20??)
- Gallantry Medal – 27 April 1994 (Captain KSM Mondeh – Principal liaison Officer 1)
- Best Foreign Student – National War College Course 6 (Colonel KSM Mondeh, psc, fwc)
- Master of Science in Strategic Studies – University of Ibadan, Nigeria (Colonel KSM Mondeh, psc, fwc, MSc)
- Brigade Commander, 2003–2005 (Colonel KSM Mondeh, psc, fwc, MSc)
- Assistant Chief of Defence Staff for Personnel and Training 2005 – 2008 (Colonel/Brig. Gen. KSM Mondeh, psc, fwc, MSc)
- Assistant Chief of Defence Staff for Operations and Plans 2008–2010 (Brig. Gen. KSM Mondeh, psc, fwc, MSc)
- Sector Commander South UNAMID Nyala Darfur (Sudan) 2010 – 2011
- Acting Force Commander UNAMID Nyala Darfur (Sudan) April – May 2011
- Sector Commander West UNAMID El-Geneina Darfur (Sudan) 11 August 2011 to 20??.
