= Eli Degibri =

Israeli jazz saxophonist, composer, and arranger

Eli Degibri אלי דג'יברי
- Born: May 3, 1978 (age 48); Tel Aviv, Israel
- Genre: Jazz
- Occupations: Musician, composer, arranger
- Instrument: Saxophone
- Labels: PiLi, Plus Loin, Anzic
- Website: www.degibri.com

Eli Degibri (Hebrew: אלי דג'יברי; born May 3, 1978, in Jaffa, Tel Aviv, Israel) is an Israeli jazz saxophonist, composer, and arranger.

== Early life ==
Degibri first began playing the mandolin at age 7 in an after-school music program at the Jaffa Conservatory of Music. Three years later, after attending a jazz concert, he became enamored with the saxophone and switched his studies to that instrument.

In 1994 Degibri was selected to receive a full scholarship to attend the Berklee College of Music's Summer Performance Program. The following year Degibri was again awarded a full scholarship and participated in the Berklee program for a second summer.

In 1997, at age 18, Degibri received a full scholarship to attend the Berklee College of Music and relocated to the United States. After a year at Berklee, he was one of only six musicians to be selected, with a full scholarship, to attend the Thelonious Monk Institute of Jazz program, where he studied and performed with Ron Carter, Benny Golson, Jimmy Heath and Clark Terry.

== Career ==
After graduating from the Monk Institute in 1999, Degibri was asked to join pianist Herbie Hancock's sextet, playing the music of Hancock's album Gershwin's World. He toured the world with them for two and a half years and appeared on The Jazz Channel Presents Herbie Hancock in 2002.

In 2002 he moved to New York City and formed a quintet with Kurt Rosenwinkel, Aaron Goldberg, Ben Street, and Jeff Ballard. The band performed at the Blue Note, the Jazz Standard, 55 Bar, and Smalls Jazz Club. That same year Degibri joined the Al Foster Quartet.

In 2003, he released his first album, In the Beginning. In 2006, he released his second album, Emotionally Available, again on Fresh Sound. That year, he appeared on another album, One Little Song, a duo collaboration with pianist Kevin Hays. He was featured on Al Foster's 2008 album Love, Peace and Jazz!, a live recording at the Village Vanguard, and on Foster's 2008 DVD The Paris Concert. A live show of the Al Foster Quartet at the Village Vanguard was broadcast on NPR on May 21, 2008.

In 2008 Degibri formed an organ trio with Gary Versace and Obed Calvaire and released his fourth album, Live at Louis 649.

In 2010, he released the album Israeli Song on Anzic Records with Ron Carter, Al Foster, and Brad Mehldau.

In January 2011 he was invited to headline at the Red Sea Jazz Festival's first winter edition, where he performed in a duo with pianist Kenny Barron. In April 2011 he joined drummer Al Foster, bassist George Mraz, and pianist Fred Hersch at Birdland Jazz Club in New York for a performance dedicated to Joe Henderson. The quartet was also invited to perform at the 2011 North Sea Jazz Festival and Gent Jazz Festival.

In October 2011 Degibri was chosen as the successor to bassist Avishai Cohen as co-Artistic Director of the Red Sea Jazz Festival.

On April 30, 2012 he was invited to be a part of UNESCO's first International Jazz Day at the UN General Assembly in New York.

On August 29, 2013 he released his sixth album, Twelve, on Degibri's label, PiLi Records, with Plus Loin Music and Gadi Lehavi, Ofri Nehemya, and Barak Mori. Degibri has also worked with Eric Reed and the Mingus Big Band.

Tom Oren has played with the Eli Degibri Quartet since 2017.

== Discography ==
=== As leader ===
- In the Beginning (2003)
- Emotionally Available (2006)
- Live at Louis 649 (2008)
- Israeli Song (2010)
- Twelve (2013)
- Cliff Hangin' (Blujazz, 2016)
- Soul Station (Degibri Records, 2018)
- Henri and Rachel (2021)

=== As co-leader ===
- One Little Song (2006) - with Kevin Hays

=== Selected sideman ===
- The Jazz Channel Presents Herbie Hancock (2002) - Herbie Hancock
- Love, Peace and Jazz! Live at the Village Vanguard (2008) - Al Foster
- The Paris Concert (2008) - Al Foster
