= Tom Oren =

Israeli jazz pianist

Tom Oren (Hebrew: תום אורן; born November 4, 1994) is an Israeli jazz pianist and winner of the 2018 Thelonious Monk Institute of Jazz International Piano Competition.

Oren was born in Tel Aviv, Israel. He graduated from Thelma Yellin High School of the Arts, Givatayim and from the Arison Campus of the Arts, Tel Aviv. He is a graduate of the Israeli Conservatory of Music, Tel Aviv, with honors. He studied for two years at the Rimon School of Jazz and Contemporary Music, finishing in 2015. Oren went to the United States to Boston's Berklee College of Music with a scholarship for four years of study starting in 2012.

Oren has been a member of the Eli Degibri Quartet since 2017.

In 2018 Oren won the Thelonious Monk Institute of Jazz International Piano Competition after competitive performances at the John F. Kennedy Center for the Performing Arts. The prize comes with a $25,000 scholarship and a recording contract with Concord Music. The songs he played were "Just as Though You Were Here", and "Just One of Those Things".
