= Komba Claudius Gbamanja =

Sierra Leonean politician

Komba Claudius Gbamanja (1925 - 2009) was a Sierra Leonean politician from the opposition Sierra Leone People's Party. He a member of parliament of Sierra Leone representing the Kono District. He was a member of the Kono ethnic group.
