= Pablo Ablanedo =

Argentine-born jazz composer, pianist, and teacher based in Cambridge, Massachusetts

Pablo Ablanedo is an Argentine-born jazz composer, pianist, and teacher based in Cambridge, Massachusetts. He is known for incorporating elements of traditional Argentine music and contemporary classical into a jazz-influenced style.

Ablanedo is the leader of the Pablo Ablanedo Octet and has released three critically acclaimed records on Fresh Sound Records, as well as a 2013 release on Creative Nation Music. His work was commissioned by Paquito D'Rivera for the Norddeutscher Rundfunk (Northern German Broadcasting) Big Band. He is a teacher and the author of Suite of Mirrors: A Collection of Mirror Pieces for the Beginning Pianist (2015).

== Biography ==
A native of Buenos Aires, Argentina, Ablanedo moved to the United States in 1993 to attend Berklee College of Music, where he studied under Herb Pomeroy and received the John Dankworth Award for Jazz Composition. He received an honorable mention in the Jazz Composers Alliance Julius Hemphill Awards in 2000. He formed the Pablo Ablanedo Octet with fellow Berklee graduates in 1999.

His first album with the Octet, From Down There, was released in 2001 on Fresh Sound New Talent. The record was reviewed positively by Down Beat magazine and the Boston Herald. He subsequently released a second album with the Octet on Fresh Sound New Talent, "Alegría" (2003), as well as contributing compositions to the label's multi-artist release The Sound of New York Jazz Underground in 2004. Ablanedo's work was also commissioned by Paquito D'Rivera to be played by the Norddeutscher Rundfunk Big Band.

In 2013, Ablanedo released his third album with the Octet, Recontradoble on Creative Nation Music. Glenn Astarita praised the album for its musical blend and its "technical excellence and shifty arrangements" in All About Jazz magazine, and the album was chosen by Danilo Navas as one of Latin Jazz Net's top Latin Jazz Albums of 2013.

== Discography ==
- From Down There (Fresh Sound, 2001)
- Alegria (Fresh Sound, 2003)
- The Sound of New York Jazz Underground (Fresh Sound, 2004)
- Recontradoble (Creative Nation, 2013)
