= Michael Oien =

American jazz musician

Michael Oien (born 13 August 1981 in Silver Spring, Maryland) is an American musician and composer living in New York City. Oien plays the acoustic bass and released his debut album And Now in 2015 on Fresh Sound Records.
