= Israeli Song (album) =

Studio album by Eli Degibri
- Released: 2010
- Genre: Jazz
- Label: Anzic

Israeli Song is an album by saxophonist Eli Degibri.

== Background and recording ==
This was Degibri's fifth recording as leader. Most of the tracks are Degibri's originals; the other band members wrote one each. On the title track, "After a slowly unfurling a capella intro, Degibri moves into the gorgeous melody supported by Mehldau's slow chordal accompaniment."

== Reception ==
The Down Beat reviewer observed that, "Though the members of the band shine during their individual solos, the musicians are deferential to Degibri's spirited tenor and soprano playing."

Professional ratings
Review scores
Source	Rating
Down Beat	4/5 stars

== Track listing ==
1. "Unrequited"
2. "Mr. R.C."
3. "Judy the Dog"
4. "Jealous Eyes"
5. "Manic Depressive"
6. "Bebop"
7. "Liora"
8. "Look What You Do To Me"
9. "Third Plane"
10. "Somewhere over the Rainbow"
11. "Israeli Song"

== Personnel ==
- Eli Degibri – tenor sax, soprano sax
- Brad Mehldau – piano
- Ron Carter – bass
- Al Foster – drums
