= Just as Though You Were Here =

Song
- Published: 1942
- Genre: Traditional pop
- Composer(s): John Benson Brooks
- Lyricist(s): Eddie DeLange

"Just as Though You Were Here" is a song written by John Benson Brooks (music) and Eddie DeLange (lyrics). The first recording was made by Tommy Dorsey and His Orchestra on May 18, 1942 with vocals by Frank Sinatra and The Pied Pipers. It reached the Billboard charts in July 1942, peaking at No. 6 during a ten-week stay. Sinatra recorded the song again on September 24, 1974 for Reprise.

== Other versions ==
- Many other artists have recorded the song including The Ink Spots in 1942 (Decca 18466A). This version went to number ten on the Harlem Hit Parade chart.
- This song was played by Tom Oren to win the 2018 Thelonious Monk Institute of Jazz competition.
