= Alatangana =

Creator deity of the Kono people of Guinea

Alatangana is one of two creator deities of the Kono people of Guinea; the other is Sa. Alatangana came to the world of Sa, took soil from a swamp to create land, and then placed vegetation on it. He fell in love with Sa's daughter, and asked Sa if he could marry her. Sa refused, but Alatangana eloped with her anyway, and they had seven sons and seven daughters.

== Bibliography ==
- In the Beginning: Creation Stories from Around the World by Virginia Hamilton, 1991, HMH Books for Young Readers, ISBN 978-0152387426

== Sources ==
- Gly.uga.edu
