= Fresh Sound =

Spanish jazz record label (founded 1983)

- Founded: 1983
- Founder: Jordi Pujol
- Distributor: Bluemoon
- Genre: Jazz
- Country of origin: Spain
- Location: Barcelona
- Official website: www.freshsoundrecords.com

Fresh Sound, or Fresh Sound New Talent, is a jazz record label established in Barcelona, Spain, by Jordi Pujol. The label was initially founded as a reissue label.

The catalog includes work by musicians both major and minor that was recorded before 1962, including Louis Armstrong, Duke Ellington, and Charlie Parker. Sources include Argo, Dawn, Prestige/New Jazz, RCA, Royal Roost, Riverside, and Verve. Fresh Sound has released music by obscure singers Jane Fielding, Beverly Kenney, Marilyn Moore, Lucy Ann Polk, and Helyne Stewart

In the early 1990s, the label began to produce new recordings. This included music by Georges Arvanitas and David Murray; Mundell Lowe and Tete Montoliu; Gabe Baltazar, Eddie Bert, Bob Cooper, Dick Hafer, Charlie Mariano, J. R. Monterose, Bill Perkins, Frank Strazzeri, and Claude Williamson. The Fresh Sound New Talent label was inaugurated in the 1990s with the work of Vinny Golia.

== Roster ==
- Pablo Ablanedo
- David Ambrosio
- Reid Anderson
- Bruce Arkin
- Omer Avital
- Gorka Benitez
- Max Bennett
- The Bad Plus
- Seamus Blake
- Albert Bover
- Marlon Browden
- Carme Canela
- Steve Cardenas
- Chris Cheek
- Avishai Cohen
- George Colligan
- Sonny Criss
- Alexis Cuadrado
- Ronnie Cuber
- Eli Degibri
- Daniel Freedman
- Johnny Glasel
- Robert Glasper
- Joe Gordon
- Phil Grenadier
- Lars Gullin
- Dick Hafer
- Amos Hoffman
- Ron Horton
- Ethan Iverson
- Michael Kanan
- Chris Lightcap
- Agnar Magnusson
- Rebecca Martin
- Bill McHenry
- Ryan Meagher
- Brad Mehldau
- Stephane Mercier
- Paul Moer
- Pat Moran McCoy
- Lanny Morgan
- Simon Moullier
- Jack Nimitz
- Hod O'Brien
- Michael Oien
- Vardan Ovsepian
- Charles Owens
- Marty Paich
- Roberta Piket
- Noah Preminger
- Andrew Rathbun
- Matt Renzi
- Pete Robbins
- Kurt Rosenwinkel
- Jorge Rossy
- Perico Sambeat
- Walter Smith III
- Grant Stewart
- Frank Strazzeri
- Marcus Strickland
- Nat Su
- Ben Waltzer
- David Weiss
- Sebastian Weiss
- Scott Wendholt
- Claude Williamson
- David Xirgu
- Miguel Zenon
- Oscar Peñas
