= Yana, Sierra Leone =

Town in the Karene District, Sierra Leone

Coordinates: 09°44′00″N 12°19′00″W

Yana is a town in the Karene District of the North West Province of Sierra Leone, near the border with Guinea.

Yana is located in the plains of Sierra Leone.

Elevation = 75m
