= Nimikoro Chiefdom =

Coordinates: 8°35′N 11°06′W

- Chiefdom
- Interactive map of Nimikoro Chiefdom
- Country: Sierra Leone
- Province: Eastern Province
- District: Kono District
- Capital: Njaiama
- Time zone: UTC+0 (GMT)

Nimikoro Chiefdom is a chiefdom in Kono District of Sierra Leone. Its capital is Njaiama.
