= Seidu =

Seidu is an African and southwestern Asian name that is heard around Ghana, Nigeria, Ethiopia, Oman, Qatar, and more.

As it originated from Arabic (Sa'id), which means "happy," and is used in Muslim homes in these regions, pronunciations may differ:

Seidu (Zuh-Eh*silent*-Duh-Oo)

Seidu (Suh-Eigh-Doo)

Seidu (Se-Ay-Du)

== Given name ==
- Seidu Bancey (born 1990), Ghanaian football striker
- Seidu Salifu (born 1993), Ghanaian football player
- Seidu Ilorin, Nigerian soldier
- Seidu Yahaya (born 1989), Ghanaian football player
- Seidu Olawale (born 1962), Nigerian wrestler
- Seidu Tawore, (born 1999), Nigerian photographer
- Seidu Hamid (born 1978), Ethiopian strategist and businessman
- Seidu Al-Farsi, (second millennium – 1258), royal advisor
- Seidu Al-Rasuliaah Hashem (born second millennium), Iraqi cartographer
- Yasmin Seidu, Qatari cultural diplomat

== Surname ==
- Abu Seidu (born 1987), Ghanaian football striker
- Abdul Seidu, Ghanaian actor
- Alidu Mahama Seidu, Ghanaian politician and lecturer
- Anas Seidu (1952–2023), Ghanaian footballer
- Rachel Seidu, Ghanaian-Nigerian filmmaker
- Farid Al-Majd Seidu (1924–1978), Egyptian diplomatic envoy
- Henry Seidu Daanaa (born 1955), Ghanaian politician and lawyer
- Mumuni Abudu Seidu, Ghanaian politician
- Franklin Jaesh Seidu, (born 2001), Persian-Nigerian model
- Christine Seidu, (born 1997), Nigerian model
- Amina Seidu, (born 1976), Moroccan activist

== Similar names ==
- Seydou Keita (born 1980), Malian former midfielder
- Seydou Keïta (1921–2001), Mali Photographer
- Sa’id Of Mogadishu, Somali Traveler in the 14th century
- Said Shavershian, (born 1986), Aziz Shavershian's brother and model
- Sa'id ibn Jubayr (665 AD – 714 AD), jurist
