= Albert Joe Demby =

Sierra Leonean politician (1934–2021)

Albert Joe Demby (born 1934 in Gerihun, Bo District, British Sierra Leone; died 2021 in Freetown) was a Sierra Leonean medical doctor, politician and a member of the Sierra Leone People's Party. He served as the Vice President of Sierra Leone from 29 March 1996 to 25 May 1997, when the administration was overthrown by a military junta. After the junta was deposed in 1998, he continued his term until President Ahmad Tejan Kabbah's term ended in 2002, and Demby was succeeded as vice president by Solomon Berewa, who had previously served as Minister of Justice and Attorney-General. Like Berewa, Joe Demby was from the Mende ethnic group.

He died on Saturday 20 March 2021, at his home in Sierra Leone.

Political offices
Preceded by Vacant	Vice President of Sierra Leone; 1996-1997	Succeeded by Military junta
Preceded by Military junta	Vice President of Sierra Leone; 2000-2002	Succeeded by Solomon Berewa
