= Port Loko =

Port Loko Port Loko, Sierra Leone
- Location in Sierra Leone
- Coordinates: 8°46′0″N 12°47′15″W
- Country: Sierra Leone
- Province: North West Province
- District: Port Loko District

Government
  - Type: City council
  - Mayor: Abubakarr Kamara (APC)

Population (2016)
  - Total: 44,900
- Time zone: UTC0 (GMT)

Port Loko is the capital of Port Loko District and since 2017 the North West Province of Sierra Leone. The city had a population of 21,961 in the 2004 census and current estimate of 44,900. Port Loko lies approximately 57 km (35 mi) north-east of Freetown. The area in and around Port Loko is a major bauxite mining and trade centre. The town lies on the main highway linking Freetown to Guinea's capital Conakry. It also lies on the over-land highway between Freetown and its major airport, Lungi International Airport, although most travellers complete this journey via the much shorter ferry or helicopter transit.

The population of Port Loko is diverse, though the Temne is the largest ethnic group. Although the Temne language is spoken alongside, the Krio language of the Sierra Leone Creole people is by far the most widely spoken in the town.

Port Loko is home to the Port Loko Teacher's College, one of the oldest and best known colleges in Sierra Leone. Port Loko has its own local radio station called Radio Bankasoka.

Port Loko has its own professional football club named the Bai Bureh Warriors of Port Loko, which is one of the oldest and most famous football clubs in Sierra Leone. The club currently plays in the Sierra Leone National First Division, the second highest football league in Sierra Leone.

== Geography ==
Port Loko lies on the Bankasoka River estuary, at about the limit of tidal effects.

== History ==
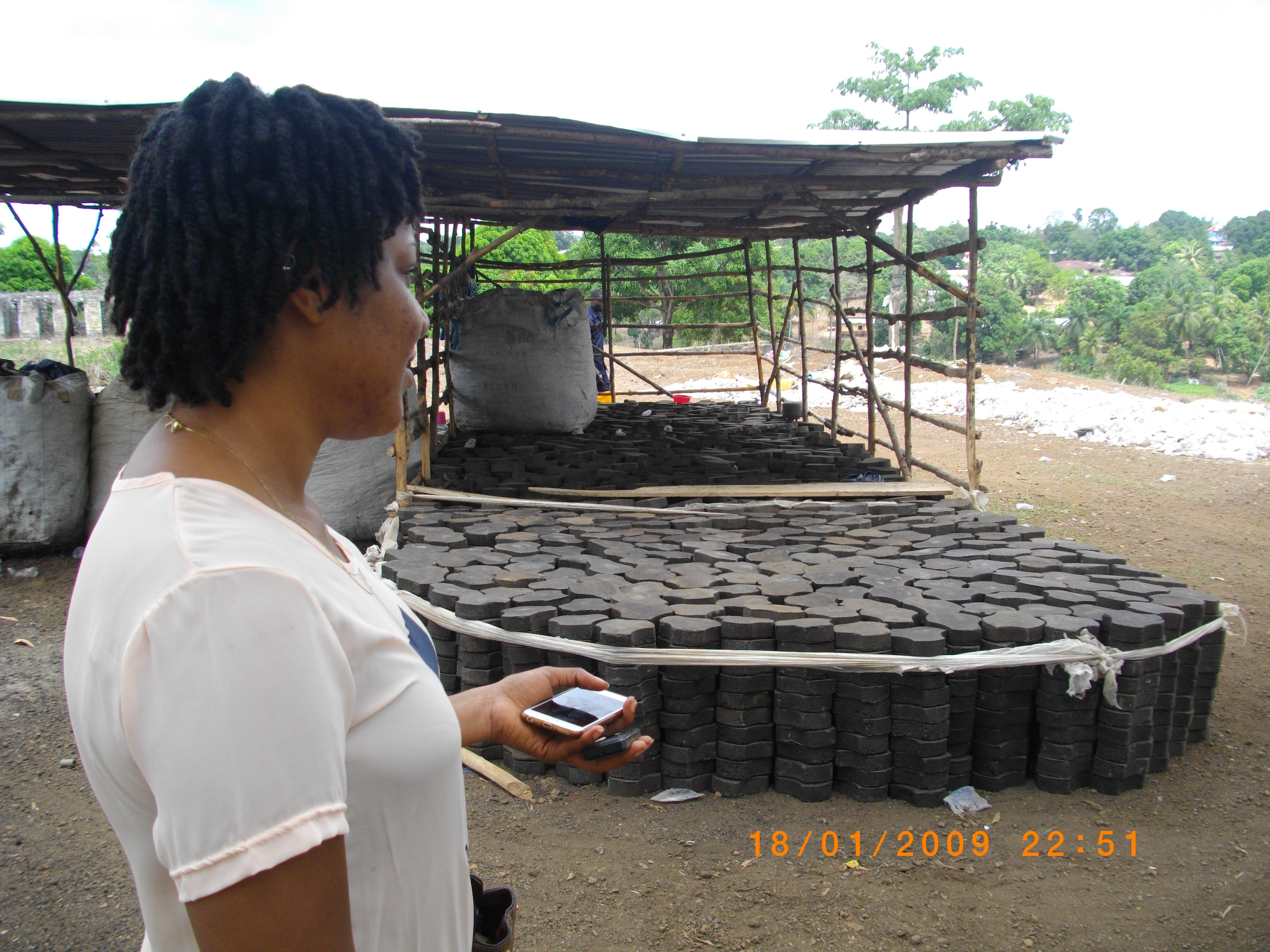
Recycling plastics in Port Loko

Port Loko gets its name from the Loko people. The town was established by Portuguese merchants. However, the Temne people subsequently came to dominate the area.

== Ethnicity ==
The population of Port Loko is ethnically diverse, although the Temne ethnic group predominate, and the Temne language is widely spoken among the people of Port Loko, along with Krio, the national language of Sierra Leone.

== Sport ==
Port Loko has a football club named the Bai Bureh Warriors. The club currently plays in the Sierra Leone National Premier Division, the highest football league in Sierra Leone, after they were recently promoted to the top division.

== Education ==
Like the rest of Sierra Leone, Port Loko has an education system with six years of primary school (Class 1–6), and six years of secondary school (Form 1–6); secondary schools are further divided into Junior secondary school (Form 1–3) and Senior secondary school (Form 4–6). Primary schools usually start from ages 6 to 12, and secondary schools usually start from ages 13 to 18. Primary Education is free and compulsory in government-sponsored public schools. The Port Loko Teacher's College, one of the major colleges in Sierra Leone is located in the city.

== Notable people from Port Loko ==
- Sorie Ibrahim Koroma, Vice President of Sierra Leone from 1971 to 1986
- Ibrahim Kemoh Sesay, Sierra Leonean politician
- Alpha Kanu, Sierra Leonean politician.
- Mamoud Tarawallie, Sierra Leonean politician.
- Emili Geogra, Sierra Leonean politician
- Abdul Karim Kamara, Sierra Leonean politician (old portloko)
