= Kangama =

- town
- Location in Sierra Leone
- Coordinates: 08°20′21″N 10°22′52″W
- Country: Sierra Leone
- Province: Eastern Province
- District: Kailahun District
- Chiefdom: Kissi Teng
- Time zone: UTC-5 (GMT)
- UFI: -1316897

Kangama is a town in Kailahun District in the Eastern Province of Sierra Leone, near the border of Liberia. It is the headquarters of the Kissi Teng Chiefdom.

== 1991-2002 civil war ==
During the Sierra Leone Civil War Revolutionary United Front (RUF) forces with support of the Liberian NPFL captured Kangama on 6 April 1991, after a failed Sierra Leone Army (SLA) attempt to secure the Kailahun District. They immediately displaced the local chieftain, looting and burning his house. The RUF conscript the local youth into the army, both boys and girls, and a number of wealthy citizens were executed. From Kangama the RUF/NPFL forces launched an attack on Buedu, leaving Kangama in their rear. By January 1992 the RUF had completely pacified the district and the local conscripts had returned from training to help maintain order. However, in February 1992, SLA forces briefly took Kangama, causing much destruction, but the RUF quickly responded and retook the town.

In Spring 1993 the SLA began a new offensive and captured Kangama in June of that year. Many individuals, whether they'd actively collaborated with the RUF forces or not, fled to Liberia and Guinea. When SLA troops left Kangama in late 1993, the RUF and others returned. The RUF began a guerrilla war in the district, and Kangama quickly returned to RUF control. The SLA again briefly took Kangama toward the end of 1994, but it was back in RUF control by December. where it remained until May 1998. Kangama did not take part in the February 1995 elections. In March 1996 the RUF opened the school at Kangama, paying the teachers in foodstuffs. In March 1998, the head of the Armed Forces Revolutionary Council that had briefly ruled Sierra Leone escaped to Kangama when Freetown fell.

In May 1998, ECOMOG forces took Kangama, but the RUF continued guerrilla warfare in the area, and Kangama was soon back in RUF hands. When the Lome Peace Accord was signed in 1999 the RUF in the Kangama area did not disarm. Some retreated into Liberia, others into the bush. It was not until December 2001 and January 2002 that the RUF in Kangama finally surrendered their arms.
