= Vice President of Sierra Leone =

Deputy head of state and head of government of Sierra Leone

The vice president of Sierra Leone is the second most senior government official in the executive branch of the Republic of Sierra Leone government after the president. The vice president's only constitutional power is to be the immediate successor to the president of Sierra Leone if the president resigned or is removed from office by the parliament. Other than that the power of the vice president depends on the role delegated to the office by the president.

The vice president of Sierra Leone is the second most influential position in the government of Sierra Leone, after the president. The current vice president of Sierra Leone is Mohamed Juldeh Jalloh, a member of the ruling Sierra Leone People's Party; he was sworn in as vice president on April 4, 2018, after the victory of Jalloh's and Julius Maada Bio's presidential ticket in the 2018 presidential election.

== Security ==
The vice president of Sierra Leone is protected by a special unit of police officers of the operational support division of the Sierra Leone Police.

== History ==
When Sierra Leone was declared a republic in 1971 by then Prime Minister Siaka Stevens, the position of vice president was created. The first vice-president was Sorie Ibrahim Koroma.

== Functions ==
The functions of the vice president are:

- Principal assistant to the president of Sierra Leone,
- To act in the president's stead when he is out of Sierra Leone or incapacitated,
- Control the movements of the people in the diamond-protected areas,
- Permit Boards,
- Various involvements with non-citizens of the Republic,
- Monitor the Cabinet,
- Any other duty that the president desires.

== Vice presidents ==
=== First vice presidents ===
No.	Portrait	Name (Birth–Death)	Term start	Term end	Political party
1		Sorie Ibrahim Koroma (1930–1994)	19 April 1971	28 November 1985	All People's Congress
2		Francis Misheck Minah (1929–1989)	28 November 1985	4 April 1987	All People's Congress
3		Abu Bakar Kamara (born 1929)	4 April 1987	September 1991	All People's Congress
4		Abdulai Osman Conteh (1945–2024)	1991	29 April 1992	All People's Congress

=== Second vice presidents ===
No.	Portrait	Name (Birth–Death)	Term start	Term end	Political party
1		Christian Alusine Kamara-Taylor (1917–1985)	1978	May 1984	All People's Congress
2		Francis Misheck Minah (1929–1989)	May 1984	November 1985	All People's Congress
3		Abu Bakar Kamara (born 1929)	November 1985	4 April 1987	All People's Congress
4		Salia Jusu-Sheriff (1929–2009)	4 April 1987	1991	Sierra Leone People's Party
5		Joseph Bandabla Dauda (1942–2017)	November 1991	29 April 1992	All People's Congress

=== Vice presidents ===
No.	Portrait	Name (Birth–Death)	Term start	Term end	Political party
1		Albert Joe Demby (1934–2021)	29 March 1996	25 May 1997	Sierra Leone People's Party
(1)		Albert Joe Demby (1934–2021)	13 February 1998	1999	Sierra Leone People's Party
2		Foday Sankoh (1937–2003)	1999	2000	Revolutionary United Front
(1)		Albert Joe Demby (1934–2021)	2000	May 2002	Sierra Leone People's Party
3		Solomon Ekuma Berewa (1938–2020)	May 2002	17 September 2007	Sierra Leone People's Party
4		Samuel Sam-Sumana (born 1962)	17 September 2007	17 March 2015	All People's Congress
5		Victor Bockarie Foh (born 1946)	17 March 2015	4 April 2018	All People's Congress
3		Mohamed Juldeh Jalloh (born 1970)	4 April 2018	Incumbent	Sierra Leone People's Party

== Deputy leaders of military juntas ==
Leader	Deputy	Term start	Term end
Andrew Juxon-Smith	Leslie William Leigh	March 1967	April 1968
Valentine Strasser	Solomon Musa	May 1992	June 1993
Valentine Strasser	Julius Maada Bio	June 1993	March 1995
Julius Maada Bio	Komba Mondeh	January 1996	March 1996
Johnny Paul Koroma	Foday Sankoh	May 1997	February 1998
Johnny Paul Koroma	Solomon Musa	May 1997	February 1998

== See also ==
- President of Sierra Leone
  - List of heads of state of Sierra Leone
- List of chief ministers and prime ministers of Sierra Leone
- List of current vice presidents
