= Anat Cohen =

Israeli clarinetist, saxophonist, and bandleader

Anat Cohen ענת כהן
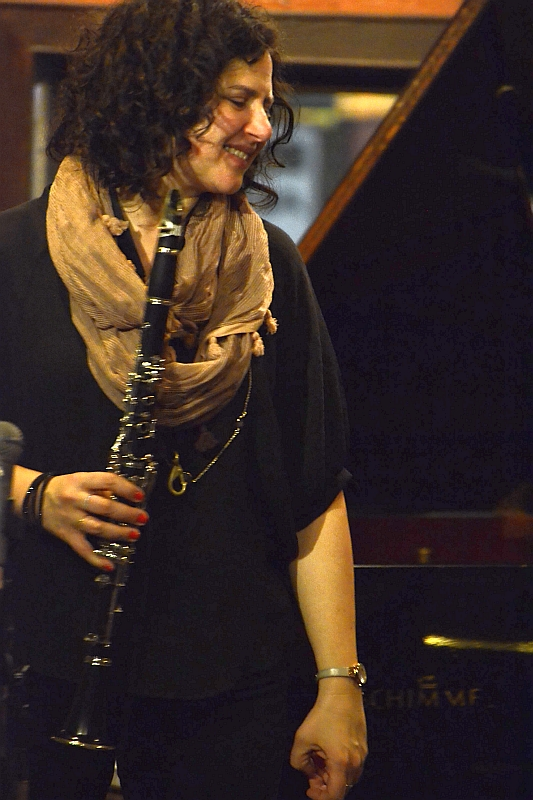
- Cohen in 2015

Background information
- Born: 1975 (age 50–51); Tel Aviv, Israel
- Genres: Jazz, post-bop
- Occupation: Musician
- Instruments: Clarinet, tenor and soprano saxophone
- Years active: 1999–present
- Label: Anzic
- Website: AnatCohen.com

Anat Cohen (/əˈnæt/; Hebrew: ענת כהן; born 1975) is a New York City-based jazz clarinetist, saxophonist, and bandleader from Tel Aviv, Israel.

== Biography ==
Cohen was born into a musical family and began playing the clarinet at age 12 with Jaffa Conservatory's Dixieland band. When she was 16, she started playing tenor saxophone with the conservatory's big band. She attended the Yellin School in 1991 and majored in jazz. She served in the Israeli military from 1993 to 1995 and studied at Berklee College of Music from 1996 to 1999. She then moved to New York and toured with the Diva Jazz Orchestra for a decade while also working with Brazilian groups such as the Choro Ensemble and Duduka Da Fonseca's Samba Jazz Quintet. She has also recorded with her brothers Avishai Cohen (trumpeter) and Yuval Cohen (alto and soprano saxophonist).

Her debut album, Place & Time, featuring Jason Lindner, Ben Street, Jeff Ballard, and Avishai Cohen, was released in 2005 on Anzic Records. Her most recent album as leader, with the Anat Cohen Tentet, was Triple Helix, released in 2019 also on Anzic Records.

Cohen performs regularly and has appeared at a number of notable jazz festivals, including the Newport Jazz Festival, Montreal International Jazz Festival, Tudo É Jazz Festival, and the North Sea Jazz Festival.

== Awards ==
In 2007 she won the awards for "Up and Coming Artist" and "Clarinetist of the Year" from the Jazz Journalists Association. She was also voted "Clarinetist of the Year" every year between 2008 and 2023 and honored as "Multi-Reedist of the Year" in 2012, 2013, 2015, and 2017 by the Jazz Journalists Association. She has received multiple citations in DownBeat magazine's annual critics' and readers' polls in multiple categories: "Rising Star" in the tenor saxophone (2012), "Rising Star" in the soprano saxophone (2013), and top ranking in the clarinet (2010–2023).

On 12 July 2013, she received the 2013 Paul Acket Award from the North Sea Jazz Festival in Rotterdam from the BNP Foundation.

On 27 November 2017, she was nominated for two Grammy Awards - for Outra Coisa: The Music Of Moacir Santos (with Marcello Goncalves) in the "Best Latin Jazz Album" category and for Rosa Dos Ventos (with Trio Brasileiro) in the "Best World Music Album" category.

She was nominated for a Grammy in 2019 for Triple Helix in the "Best Large Jazz Ensemble Album" category.

== Discography ==
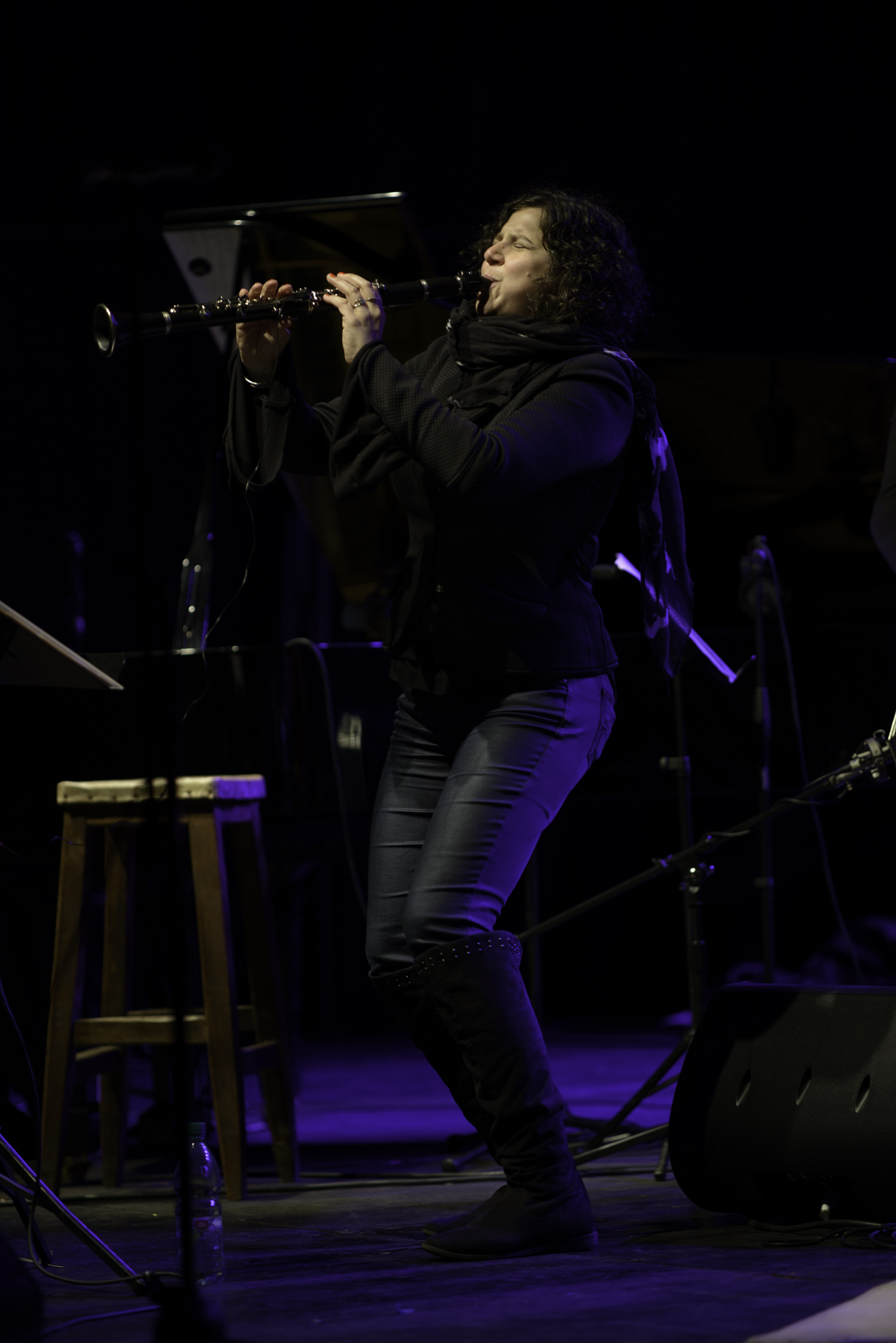
Cohen in 2014

As Leader

- Place & Time (2005)
- Poetica (2007)
- Notes From the Village (2008)
- Clarinetwork: Live at the Village Vanguard (2010)
- Claroscuro (2012)
- Luminosa (2015)

With The Anzic Orchestra

- Noir (2007)

With The Choro Ensemble

- Choro Ensemble (2005)
- Nosso Tempo (2008)

With 3 Cohens

- One (2003)
- Braid (2007)
- Family (2011)
- Tightrope (2013)

With Cyro Baptista

- Beat the Donkey (Tzadik, 2002)
- Infinito (Tzadik, 2009)

Brazilian style

- Alegria Da Casa, with Trio Brasileiro (2016)
- Outra Coisa, with Marcello Gonçalves & Moacir Santos (2017)
- Rosa Dos Ventos, with Trio Brasileiro (2017)

With Quartetinho

- Quartetinho (2022)
- Quartetinho: Bloom (2024)

With The Anat Cohen Tentet

- Happy Song (2017)
- Triple Helix (2019)

With Fred Hersch

- Live In Healdsburg (2018)
