= Komba Eric Koedoyoma =

Sierra Leonean politician

Komba Eric Koedoyoma is a Sierra Leonean politician with the Sierra Leone People's Party. Koedoyoma is a member of parliament representing his hometown of Kono District.
