= Osman Foday Yansaneh =

Sierra Leonean politician

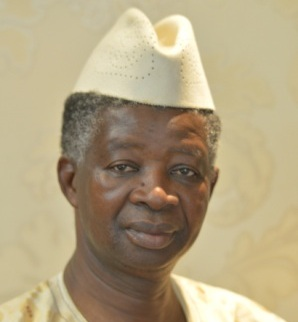
- Osman Foday Yansaneh

Secretary-General of the All People's Congress
- Incumbent
- Assumed office 2012
- President: Ernest Bai Koroma
- Preceded by: Victor Bockarie Foh

Sierra Leone Ambassador to Ghana
- In office 2007–2012
- Preceded by: Alie Bangura
- Succeeded by: Umu Hawa Tejan-Jalloh

Personal details
- Born: Kamakwie, Bombali District, Sierra Leone
- Education: Fourah Bay College
- Profession: Lawyer
- Religion: Islam (Sunni)

Alhaji Osman Foday Yansaneh is a Sierra Leonean politician who has been Secretary-General of the All People's Congress political party, the ruling party in Sierra Leone, since 2012. Yansaneh is a close ally and senior advisor to President Ernest Bai Koroma.

A Fourah Bay College graduate with a Bachelor of Laws, Yansaneh is a long time member of the APC party, and was a personal assistant to President Joseph Saidu Momoh, before the Momoh government was overthrown in a 1992 military coup. He served as Sierra Leone's Ambassador to Ghana before he was elected Secretary-General of the APC party in 2012. Yansaneh is a senior member of the APC party, and a member of the APC Advisory Council, which is made up of the most senior members of the APC. Yansaneh is a native of Kamakwie, Karene District in northern Sierra Leone.

== Early life and education ==
Osman Foday Yansaneh was born in Kamakwie, Sella Limba chiefdom, Bombali District in the Northern Province of Sierra Leone. Yansaneh was born to very religious Muslim parents; and Yansaneh himself is a devote Muslim. Yansaneh has made the Hajj pilgrimage to the holy Islamic cities of Mecca and Medina.

Yansaneh attended the Wesleyan Secondary School in Kamakwie, a Christian funded school, that was and still open to people of all religion. Yansaneh was a class prefect, and was considered one of the most brilliant students in the school. Yansaneh was the first student from the Kamakwie Wesleyan secondary school to pass his GCE examination. He was then given an academic scholarship at Fourah Bay College where he graduated with a political science degree. Upon graduation from Fourah Bay College, Yansaneh was employed as a teacher Kamakwie Wesleyan secondary school, the school he attended. After serving as a teacher at the Kamakwie Wesleyan secondary for a while, He was promoted to the position of Principal at the same school.

== Political career ==
Yansaneh was a personal assistant to President Joseph Saidu Momoh before the Momoh government was overthrown in a military coup in 1992. He served as Sierra Leone's Ambassador to Ghana under President Ernest Bai Koroma before he was elected as Secretary-General of the APC party in 2012. Yansaneh is a senior member of the APC party, and a member of the APC Advisory Council, which is made up of the most senior members of the APC. Yansaneh is a native of Kamakwie, Bombali District in northern Sierra Leone.
