= Komba gewerkschaft =

komba
- komba gewerkschaft
- Headquarters: Berlin, Germany
- Location: Germany
- Members: 80,000
- Key people: Sandra van Heemskerk, president
- Website: www.komba.de

The komba gewerkschaft is a German trade union in Berlin. It organises over 80.000 local administration workers.
