= Kemoh Sesay =

Sierra Leonean politician

Ibrahim Kemoh Sesay

Minister of Transportation and Aviation
- In office 14 October 2007 – August 4, 2008
- President: Ernest Bai Koroma
- Preceded by: Momodu Pat-Sowe

Personal details
- Born: Port Loko, Port Loko District, Sierra Leone
- Party: All People's Congress (APC)
- Education: Fourah Bay College
- Profession: Politician

Ibrahim Kemoh Sesay (or Sessay, born 24 August 1960 in Port Loko) is a Sierra Leonean politician from the ruling All People's Congress (APC) political party. He is Sierra Leone's former Minister of Transportation and Aviation and member of the Pan-African Parliament.

== Biography ==
Sesay is born in Port Loko, Port Loko District, a muslim and a member of the Temne ethnic group.

From 2002 on, he had served as a member of Parliament of Sierra Leone representing Port Loko District. Sesay easily won re-election in 2007 with 75.7% of the total vote in his district; he had defeated Munirr Sankoh of the Sierra Leone People's Party by nearly 9,000 votes. He was appointed Minister of Transportation by president Ernest Bai Koroma in October, 2007.
