= Solomon Berewa =

Sierra Leonean politician (1938–2020)

Solomon Ekuma Dominic Berewa

Vice President of Sierra Leone
- In office 2002 – September 17, 2007
- President: Ahmad Tejan Kabbah
- Preceded by: Albert Joe Demby
- Succeeded by: Samuel Sam-Sumana

Leader of the Sierra Leone People's Party (SLPP)
- In office February 2, 2005 – September 17, 2007
- Preceded by: Ahmed Tejan Kabbah
- Succeeded by: John Oponjo Benjamin

Attorney General and Minister of Justice of Sierra Leone
- In office 1996–2002
- Succeeded by: Fredrick Max Carew

Personal details
- Born: August 6, 1938 Bumpe Chiefdom, Bo District, British Sierra Leone
- Died: March 5, 2020 (aged 81)
- Party: Sierra Leone People's Party (SLPP)
- Spouse(s): Widowed with five children; Annie, Solomon Jr., Edwin, Augustine, Martin, and Francis
- Education: Fourah Bay College: freetown, Sierra Leone; Newcastle University: Newcastle, England
- Profession: Lawyer

Solomon Ekuma Dominic Berewa (6 August 1938 – 5 March 2020) was Vice-president of Sierra Leone from May 2002 to September 2007. Standing as the candidate of the Sierra Leone People's Party (SLPP), he was defeated in the second round of the 2007 presidential election by Ernest Bai Koroma of the All People's Congress (APC).

== Life and career ==
Berewa was born in 1938 in Bumpe Chiefdom, Bo District.

Under President Ahmed Tejan Kabbah, Berewa was Attorney-General and Minister of Justice from 1996 to 1997, when the government was ousted in a coup. After Kabbah was restored to power, Berewa was Attorney-General and Minister of Justice again from 1998 to May 2002. He then became vice-president.

At the SLPP's national convention in Makeni on September 3–4, 2005, Berewa was selected by the SLPP as its leader and its 2007 presidential candidate. He received 291 votes, while Charles Margai received 34, Julius Maada Bio received 33, and J. B. Dauda received 28.

In the first round of the 2007 presidential election, held on August 11, Berewa took second place with 38.3% of the vote, behind Koroma, the candidate of the opposition APC, who won 44.3%. A second-round between Berewa and Koroma was held on September 8, and on September 17 Koroma was declared the winner, with 54.6% of the vote against 45.4% for Berewa. Berewa promptly conceded defeat, and Koroma was sworn in later on the same day at a ceremony at which Berewa was present.

In keeping with the SLPP constitution, which requires its leader to resign if the party loses a national election under his leadership, Berewa resigned as party leader on October 17, 2007.

Political offices
Preceded by Albert Joe Demby	Vice President of Sierra Leone; 2002–2007	Succeeded by Samuel Sam-Sumana
