= Kono people =

Kono
Total population
- 363,051

Regions with significant populations
- Eastern Province (particularly in Kono District)

Languages
- Kono • English • Krio

Religion
- Christianity, Islam and African traditional religion

Related ethnic groups
- Mandingo, Vai people

The Kono people (pronounced koh noh) are a major Mande-speaking ethnic group in Sierra Leone at 5.2% of the country's total population. Their homeland is the diamond-rich Kono District in eastern Sierra Leone. The Kono are primarily diamond miners and farmers.

The Kono people speak the Kono language as their first language and is the most widely spoken language among the Kono people. Many youth from the Kono ethnic group use the Krio language as the primary language of communication with other Sierra Leonean ethnic groups.

Unlike many other Sierra Leonean ethnic groups, the Kono people rarely travel outside Eastern Sierra Leone; as a result only a few Konos are found in the capital Freetown or in northern Sierra Leone.

== History ==
The Kono people are the descendants of Mali-Guinean migrants who are said to have moved to Sierra Leone and settled in what is now Kono District in the mid-16th century, however there is archaeological evidence of settlement in Kono District as far back as 2200 B.C. Kono history claims that the Kono were once a powerful people in Mali and Guinea. The Kono migrated to Sierra Leone as peaceful hunters. The tribe was split during partitioning of Africa by European colonists and part of the tribe still exists in neighbouring Guinea.

Attacks from the related Mende people forced the Kono to seek refuge in the Koranko territory to the north, where they were allowed to farm the land. The Mende eventually moved further south, and the Kono returned to their own land in the east.

== Religious and spiritual beliefs ==
Most Konos practice Islam or Christianity. Some practice traditional religion as well. Konos invoke and pray to their ancestors and other spirits for protection, health, guidance and good fortune. They believe the ancestors are present during every activity, including eating, sleeping, and important events. Some Kono are also superstitious and use curses, omens, charms, and magic in their daily lives.

The Kono people also utilize practices of the Bondo secret society which aims at gradually but firmly establishing attitudes related to adulthood in girls, discussions on fertility, morality and proper sexual comportment. The society also maintains an interest in the well-being of its members throughout their lives.

== Notable Kono people ==
- Foamansa Matturi, Sierra Leonean ruler and military strategist during colonial era
- Samuel Sam-Sumana, former vice-president of Sierra Leone
- Sahr Randolf Fillie-Faboe, former Sierra Leone's Ambassador to Liberia and former member of parliament
- Sia Nyama Koroma, Sierra Leone's first lady and wife of President Ernest Bai Koroma
- Samuel Komba Kambo, a retired captain in The Republic of Sierra Leone Armed Forces and one of the leading members of the NPRC junta administration
- Tamba Songu M'briwa, prominent Sierra Leonean politician, formed Dao political Party and former paramount chief of Kono District
- Peter Vandy, former Sierra Leone's Minister of Lands and the Environment
- Alex Tamba Brima, former commander of the Republic of Sierra Leone Armed Rebel Forces and convicted war criminal
- Sahr Senesie, Sierra Leonean football star playing in Germany
- Komba Claudius Gbamanja, former member of parliament of Sierra Leone representing Kono District
- Komba Yomba, Sierra Leonean football star
- Komba Eric Koedoyoma, member of Sierra Leone's parliament representing Kono District
- Fuambai Ahmadu, Sierra Leonean-American anthropologist, author, gender activist
- Trevoh Chalobah Chelsea FC football star
- Mustapha Sama
- Emmanuel Samadia
- Sahr Ngaujah, actor, writer, director - Broadway, television and graphic novels

== See also ==
- Alatangana
