= Anzic Records =

Independent record label

- Founded: 2005
- Founder: Colin Negrych, Anat Cohen
- Genre: Jazz
- Country of origin: United States
- Location: New York City
- Official website: anzicrecords.com

Anzic Records is an independent record label, based in New York City. It was founded in 2005 and has released many albums by Israeli musicians, but does not restrict itself to performers from that country.

== History and scope ==
The label was founded by "philanthropist and businessman Colin Negrych with clarinetist/saxophonist Anat Cohen". "Anzic" is a portmanteau of Cohen's first name and "music"/"muzic". Cohen's Place and Time was its first release, in 2005. They released nine CDs in 2007. The scope of Anzic's material was summarized by a writer in The New York City Jazz Record in 2011: "Anzic Records has been a platform for showcasing the unique appreciation that Israeli jazz musicians have for the Talmud according to Trane [John Coltrane] and the Mishnah according to Miles [Davis]." Their roster, however, includes non-Israeli musicians.

== Practices ==
The musicians are involved in all facets of their recordings, from conception to marketing. In contrast with many other labels, the musicians are "paid immediately for CD sales versus waiting for the recording advance to be recovered." Cohen contrasted this with a typical record label experience: each musician with Anzic "knows exactly what's going on. They are part of the process. I think it's really important that musicians wake up and know the numbers, realistic numbers: how much it costs to make a CD, how much people expect to be paid, when they can get paid."
