= Kono District =

- Location of Kono District in Sierra Leone
- Coordinates: 8°45′N 11°00′W
- Country: Sierra Leone
- Province: Eastern Province
- Capital: Koidu Town
- Largest city: Koidu Town

Government
  - Type: District Council
  - Council Chairman: Sahr Solomon Gbondo (C4C)

Area
  - Total: 5,641 km^{2} (2,178 sq mi)

Population (2021 census)
  - Total: 620,703
  - Density: 110.0/km^{2} (285.0/sq mi)
- Time zone: UTC-5 (Greenwich Mean Time)
- HDI (2017): 0.391 low · 7th

Kono District is a district in the Eastern Province of Sierra Leone. Its capital and largest city is Koidu Town. Motema is the second most populous city in the district. The other major towns in the district include Yengema, Tombodu, Jaiama Nimikor and Sewafe. The district is the largest diamond producer in Sierra Leone. The population of Kono District is 620,703. Kono District borders Kenema District to the southwest, The Republic of Guinea to the east, Koinadugu District to the northeast and Kailahun District to the southeast. Kono District is divided into fourteen chiefdoms.

Kono District is one of the most ethnically diverse Districts in Sierra Leone and is home to a large population of many of Sierra Leone's ethnic groups, with no single ethnic group forming a majority.

Kono District population is religiously diverse among Muslims and Christians, though Muslims make up the majority of the population in Kono District.

Before the civil war, Kono District had a population well over 600,000; however, it experienced devastation during the Sierra Leone Civil War, which forced many of the residents out of the district. The district was heavily looted and constantly fought over due to the rich diamond reserves in the area.

== Government and politics ==
Kono District is governed with a district council form of government, which is headed by a District Council Chairman, who is responsible for the general management of the district. The District Council Chairman is elected directly by the residents of Kono District in every four years. The Kono District Council Hall located in the district capital Koidu Town, is the official Hall where members of the Kono District Council meet. The current chairman of Kono district council is Richard Abdulrahman Koninga of the All People's Congress (APC) who was sworn in on January 26, 2012, after winning the Kono District Local Council Elections. Richard Abdulrahman Koninga inauguration at the Kenema City Hall in Kenema Town was attended by president Ernest Bai Koroma. He succeeded Finda Diana Konomanyi of the All People's Congress (APC) whose tenure of office expired in 2012, leading to the 2012 Local Council Elections. The city of Koidu Town is a municipality and has its own city council, led by Mayor Saa Emerson Lamina.

Each one of the fourteen chiefdoms in Kono District is led by a paramount chief, who is highly influential. Paramount Chiefs hold significant powers and are highly respected across Sierra Leone.

Kono District is similar to swing states in American politics, as the District is not considered a political stronghold of any political parties in Sierra Leone. This is primarily due to the ethnic diversity of the district's population and the fact that two of Sierra Leone's largest ethnic groups the Mende and Temne do not form a significant portion of the Kono District population . The Kono District representatives in the Parliament of Sierra Leone is about equal between SLPP and APC members. Kono District is a major campaign stops in Sierra Leone Presidential election.

The District has recently lean towards the APC in municipal and local elections held in 2008 and 2011, though the SLPP still maintain strong support in the District. The SLPP previously controlled the Kono District Council local government and the Koidu city council, until 2008 when the APC took control. The SLPP has won Kono District in the last three Sierra Leone Presidential elections held in 1996, 2002 and 2007.

In the 2007 Sierra Leone presidential election, the SLPP presidential candidate Solomon Berewa won the district over the APC candidate Ernest Bai Koroma, despite the fact that Koroma's vice presidential candidate Alhaji Samuel Sam-Sumana and Koroma's wife Sia Koroma are both natives of Kono District. Ahmad Tejan Kabbah of the SLPP won the District both in the 1996 and 2002 Sierra Leone Presidential elections.

== Religion ==
Religion in Kono District (2015)
Religion	Percent(%)
Islam	54.3%
Christianity	43.5%
Baháʼí	0.1%
Traditional African religions	0.2%
Other	1.8%
No religion	0.1%

== Economy ==
Kono District is the largest diamond producer in Sierra Leone. Other important economic activities include gold mining and agricultural production of rice, coffee and cacao.

== Education ==
Prominent Secondary Schools are:

- Koidu Secondary School
- Koidu Girls Secondary School
- Ansarul Islamic Boys Secondary School
- Ansarul Islamic Girls Secondary School
- Islamic Secondary School Koidu
- Sierra Leone Muslim Brotherhood Secondary School
- Jaiama Secondary School
- Yengema Secondary School
- Kono Model Academy

Sewafe Secondary School

- Aziz Secondary School Motema

== Sport ==
Kono is home to Sierra Leonean Premier League club the Diamond Stars of Kono. The club is one of the oldest, biggest, and most popular football clubs in Sierra Leone. The club have won the Sierra Leonean FA Cup once, in 1992. Famous local football clubs are Flamingo FC, Rangers FC, Cosmos FC & Farmers FC.

== Administrative divisions ==
=== Chiefdoms ===
==== Pre-2017 ====
Prior to the 2017 local administrative reorganization, Kono District was made up of fourteen chiefdoms as the third level of administrative subdivision.

1. Fiama – Njagbwema
2. Gbane Kandor – Koardu
3. Gbane – Ngandorhun
4. Gbense – Yardu
5. Gorama Kono – Kangama
6. Kamara – Tombodu
7. Lei – Siama
8. Mafindor – Kamiendor
9. Nimikoro – Njaiama
10. Nimiyama – Sewafe
11. Sandor – Kayima
12. Soa – Kainkordu
13. Tankoro – Bayama Tankoo
14. Toli – Kondewakor

They are further sub-divided into seventy-two sections. Each chiefdom has one traditional ruler known as paramount chief.

==== Post-2017 ====
After the 2017 local administrative reorganization, Kono District has made up of fifteen chiefdoms as the third level of administrative subdivision.

1. Fiama – Njagbwema
2. Gbane Kandor – Koardu
3. Gbane – Ngandorhun
4. Gbense – Yardu
5. Gorama Kono – Kangama
6. Kamara – Tombodu
7. Lei – Siama
8. Mafindor – Kamiendor
9. Nimikoro – Njaiama
10. Nimiyama – Sewafe
11. Sandor – Kayima
12. Soa – Kainkordu
13. Tankoro – Bayama Tankoo
14. Toli – Kondewakor
15. Koidu Town (Note: Formerly part of Gbense Chiefdom.) – Koidu

=== Major towns ===
- Koidu Town
- Motema
- Yengema
- Tombodu
- Yamandu
- Jaiama Nimikor
- Jaiama Sewafe

=== Towns and villages ===
- Foindu
- Jaiama Sewafe
- Kaima
- Kamiendor
- Kangama
- Kombayendeh
- Ndoyogbo
- Nemeseidu
- Ngiehun
- Njagbwema
- Njaiama
- Peyima
- Seidu*
- Simbakoro
- Tefeya
- Tomendeh
- (Yardu)
- (Quidadu)
- (Bayama)
- (Chenedu)
- (Faada)
- (Koakor)

== Popular culture ==
Kono District was the setting for much of Blood Diamond, an Academy Award-nominated film starring Leonardo DiCaprio and Djimon Hounsou.

The name Kono was also used in the 2005 film Lord of War as the cover name for the sea vessel Kristol to fool Interpol agents searching for an illegal weapons shipment hidden in the Kristol's cargo.

== Notable people from Kono District ==
- Samuel Sam-Sumana, former vice president of Sierra Leone
- Johnny Paul Koroma, former head of state of Sierra Leone
- Sia Koroma, first lady of Sierra Leone
- K-Man, Sierra Leonean musician
- Patrick Bantamoi, football star
- Sam Bockarie, former RUF leader
- Solomon Musa, former vice chairman of the NPRC
- Sidique Mansaray, football star
- Komba Yomba, football star
- Komba Mondeh, a retired Lieutenant Colonel in the Sierra Leonean army
- Francis Koroma, football star
- Captain (Rtd.) Dr. Aiah Lebbie,Pediatric surgeon at the University of Sierra Leone.

== See also ==
- Yardu Sando

== Sources ==
- https://web.archive.org/web/20070121122533/http://www.statehouse-sl.org/member-parliament.html
- http://www.mineralcommodities.com.au/mrc160606.php
