= Eastern Province, Sierra Leone =

Province of Sierra Leone

Coordinates: 8°15′N 11°00′W

Eastern Province Istan Prɔvins
- Province
- Country: Sierra Leone
- Capital: Kenema

Area
  - Total: 15,736 km^{2} (6,076 sq mi)

Population (2021 census)
  - Total: 1,943,610
  - Density: 123.51/km^{2} (319.90/sq mi)
- Time zone: UTC0 (Greenwich Mean Time)

The Eastern Province (Krio: Istan Prɔvins) is one of the four provinces of Sierra Leone. It covers an area of 15,736 km^{2} and has a population of 1,943,610 (2021 census). Its capital and administrative centre is Kenema. Eastern Province, the centre of the country's diamond mining industry, is very mountainous and has two ranges, the Gola Hills and the Loma Mountains.

== Economy ==
The Eastern Province is the heart of Sierra Leone's diamond mining activity. The precious stone was first discovered in around the 1930s, and has played a major part in the region's history ever since. Most diamonds are mined and exported by small local enterprises, numbering around 200,000 to 300,000; some of these are illegal, while many are officially sanctioned. Additionally, there are a handful of foreign countries carrying out larger scale diamond mining.

== Geography ==
The Eastern Province borders the Nzérékoré Region of Guinea to the northeast, the Liberian counties of Lofa, Gbarpolu and Grand Cape Mount to the east and south, and the Sierra Leonian Southern and Northern provinces to the west and northwest. Eastern Province is the only region of Sierra Leone without any shoreline.

The province is home to the Gola Hills, a tract of rainforest with fauna including chimpanzees, western red colobus, many endemic species of bird, and a sparse population of pygmy hippopotamus. The other main area of wilderness is the Loma Mountains, which lie mostly in the Northern Province, but also extend into the northern part of the Eastern Province.

== Districts ==
The province is divided into 3 districts. They are: Kailahun District, based around the city of Kailahun; Kenema District, which is headquartered by the provincial capital Kenema; and Kono District, headquartered at Koidu.

== Religion ==
Religion in Eastern Province (2015)
Religion	Percent(%)
Islam	69.4%
Christianity	29.00%
Baháʼí	0.1%
Traditional African religions	0.1%
Other	1.2%
No religion	0.2%

== See also ==
- Subdivisions of Sierra Leone
