= 2026 in Sierra Leone =

- Decades: 2000s; 2010s; 2020s
- See also: Other events of 2026; Timeline of Sierra Leonean history

Events in the year 2026 in Sierra Leone.

== Incumbents ==
- President: Julius Maada Bio
- Vice President: Mohamed Juldeh Jalloh
- Chief Minister of Sierra Leone: David Moinina Sengeh

== Events ==
=== January ===
- 18 January – Sierra Leone holds its first National Day of Remembrance to commemorate the victims of the Sierra Leone Civil War.

=== February ===
- 22 February – Sixteen Sierra Leonean soldiers are detained by Guinean forces along the Guinea–Sierra Leone border in Faranah Region. They are released on 27 February.

=== April ===
- 5 April – An Afrigas truck carrying stoves collided with a jeepney along the Makeni–Kamakwe highway, killing five people.
- 22 April – The government signs a reconnaissance permit agreement with Shell plc, allowing offshore geological and geophysical surveys across multiple blocks covering 26,000 km^{2} (10,000 sq mi).

=== May ===
- 7 May – A container truck collides into multiple vehicles on a highway in Freetown, killing 10 people.
- 21 May – Sierra Leone begins accepting migrants deported from the United States.

=== July ===
- 20 July – Member states of the Economic Community of West African States (ECOWAS) sign an intergovernmental agreement in Freetown supporting the proposed African Atlantic Gas Pipeline.

== Holidays ==
- 1 January – New Year's Day
- 18 February – Armed Forces Day
- 30–31 March – Korité
- 18 April – Good Friday
- 21 April – Easter Monday
- 27 April – Independence Day
- 1 May – International Workers' Day
- 6 June – Tabaski
- 4 September – The Prophet's Birthday
- 25 December – Christmas Day
- 26 December – Boxing Day

== Deaths ==
- 15 June – Minkailu Mansaray, 75, MP (2002–2007)
