= 2007 in Sierra Leone =

- Decades: 1980s; 1990s; 2000s; 2010s; 2020s
- See also: Other events of 2007; Timeline of Sierra Leonean history

The following list is of events that happened during 2007 in Sierra Leone.

== Incumbents ==
- President: Ahmad Tejan Kabbah
- Vice-President: Solomon Ekuma Berewa
- Chief Justice: Ade Renner Thomas

== Events ==
=== June ===
- 2007 Paramount Airlines helicopter crash

On 3 June 2007 a helicopter operated by Paramount Airlines crashed near Lungi International Airport in Sierra Leone killing at least 20 people, including Togolese Minister for Sport, Richard Attipoe.

- 7 June 2007 - United States agrees to cancel 100% ($58 million USD) of Sierra Leone's foreign debt.
- June 2007, Bo Waterside, a key border crossing on the Mano River, re-opens for the first time since 1990 allowing increased traffic between Sierra Leone and Liberia.

=== August and September ===
- Sierra Leonean general election, 2007

On 11 August 2007, Sierra Leone held a general election to elect a new President and Parliament. The parliament saw 59 seats go to All People's Congress members, 43 to Sierra Leone People's Party members and 10 to upstart People's Movement for Democratic Change members. The president election, in the first round of voting, saw the APC candidate, Ernest Bai Koroma, win 44% of the national votes, which was the highest. Both Bai Koroma and SLPP candidate Solomon Berewa ran in the run-off election on 8 September, which Ernest Bai Koroma won with 54.62% of the run-off vote.

=== December ===
- In December 2007, Alhassan Bangura, a professional footballer with Watford F.C. from Sierra Leone had an application and appeal for asylum in the United Kingdom denied and faced deportation back to his country.
- The 2007 Koidu-Sefadu protest was an action by 400 protesters in the town of Koidu-Sefadu in Eastern Province. The protest was aimed at the local diamond mine which the resident claim has lowered local living conditions and environmental conditions in the area. The result of the protest was a clampdown by Sierra Leonean police and the death of 2 protesters.
- The 2007 Freetown explosion occurred on 20 December. The combination of a gas leak and fire on Free State in downtown Freetown killed at least 18 people, possibly including medics and firefighters.

== Sport ==
=== Football ===
==== African Cup of Nations qualifiers ====
- 24 March: Sierra Leone lost to Togo 1-3 in Lomé.
- 3 June: Sierra Leone lost to Togo 0-1 in a match at the National Stadium in Freetown.
- 17 June: Sierra Leone lost to Mali 0-3 in Bamako
- 12 October: Sierra Leone lost 0-2 Benin in Freetown.

==== Amílcar Cabral Cup ====
- 30 November: Sierra Leone lost to Senegal U-23 0-1 in Bissau
- 2 December: Sierra Leone lost to Guinea-Bissau 0-2 in Bissau

==== International friendlies ====
- 23 December: Sierra Leone vs. The Gambia, Bakau, The Gambia

== Deaths ==
- 22 February - Samuel Hinga Norman, former chieftain of the Kamajors Paramilitary and key actor in the Sierra Leone Civil War, dies in Dakar, Senegal while undergoing surgery.
