= 2023 in Sierra Leone =

- Decades: 2000s; 2010s; 2020s
- See also: Other events of 2023; Timeline of Sierra Leonean history

Events in the year 2023 in Sierra Leone.

== Incumbents ==
- President: Julius Maada Bio
- Vice President: Mohamed Juldeh Jalloh
- Chief Minister of Sierra Leone: Jacob Jusu Saffa

== Events ==
Ongoing – COVID-19 pandemic in Sierra Leone

- 24 June – General election.
- 31 July – A coup plot is halted.
- 26 November – 2023 Freetown attacks: Sierra Leone declares a national curfew following an attack by militants on barracks in Freetown. The militants later break into Freetown Central Prison, setting some inmates free.

== Deaths ==
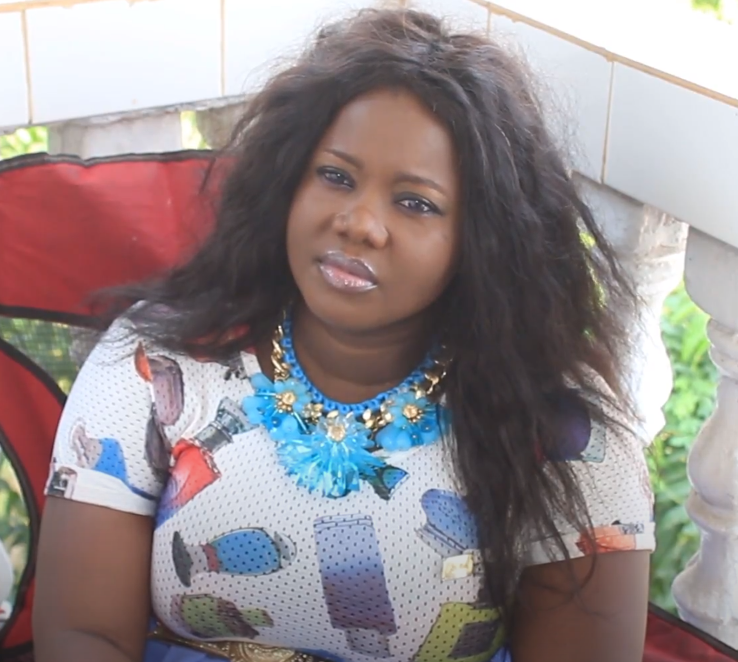
Henrietta Mbawah

- 17 February – Henrietta Mbawah, actress, filmmaker and social activist (born c. 1988).
