= 2025 in Sierra Leone =

- Decades: 2000s; 2010s; 2020s
- See also: Other events of 2025; Timeline of Sierra Leonean history

Events in the year 2025 in Sierra Leone.

== Incumbents ==
- President: Julius Maada Bio
- Vice President: Mohamed Juldeh Jalloh
- Chief Minister of Sierra Leone: David Moinina Sengeh

== Events ==
- 13 January – A state of emergency is declared following the discovery of two cases of mpox in the previous four days.
- 7 March – Investigative outlets publish a video of immigration chief Alusine Kanneh receiving a gift from fugitive Dutch drug lord Johannes Leijdekkers at a Freetown restaurant, causing President Bio to fire him.
- 2 April – Sierra Leone starts giving out Mpox vaccines.
- 4 June – US President Donald Trump issues a proclamation imposing partial restrictions on Sierra Leonean nationals travelling to the United States.
- 13 July – The Gola-Tiwai complex, which includes Tiwai Island and the Gola Rainforest National Park, is designated as a World Heritage Site by UNESCO.
- 16 December – US President Donald Trump issues a proclamation barring Sierra Leonean nationals from entering the United States.

== Holidays ==
- 1 January – New Year's Day
- 18 February – Armed Forces Day
- 30–31 March – Korité
- 18 April – Good Friday
- 21 April – Easter Monday
- 27 April – Independence Day
- 1 May – International Workers' Day
- 6 June – Tabaski
- 4 September – The Prophet's Birthday
- 25 December – Christmas Day
- 26 December – Boxing Day
