= 2022 in Sierra Leone =

- Decades: 2000s; 2010s; 2020s
- See also: Other events of 2022; Timeline of Sierra Leonean history

Events in the year 2022 in Sierra Leone.

== Incumbents ==
- President of Sierra Leone: Julius Maada Bio
- Chief Minister of Sierra Leone: David J. Francis

== Events ==
- COVID-19 pandemic in Sierra Leone
- 2022 Sierra Leone doctors strike
- 2022 Sierra Leone protests

== Sports ==
- Sierra Leone at the 2021 Islamic Solidarity Games
- Sierra Leone at the 2022 Commonwealth Games
- Sierra Leone at the 2022 World Athletics Championships
