= 2022 Sierra Leone protests =

In August 2022, violent protests and riots broke out in Sierra Leone. The protests were concentrated in the capital, Freetown, and in the north, including Makeni and Kamakwie. The protests were triggered by the nation's cost of living crisis. A nationwide curfew was implemented. At least twenty-seven civilians and six police officers died in the protests.

== Background ==
The cause of the protest was tensions regarding the cost of living. Inflation in Sierra Leone rose to 28% in June. The price of petrol increased over the past year. Inflation was exacerbated by the impacts of the Russian invasion of Ukraine, the COVID-19 pandemic, and the global food crisis. Sierra Leoneans felt that the government lacked support for the people, and they blamed the government for inadequate communication about economic problems.

Protestors were unhappy about the government's limitation of the freedom to protest. The country's public order act, enacted in 1965, requires permission from the police to protest, which is usually not granted. In July 2022, a peaceful protest in Freetown was led by women working in markets. This resulted in dozens of arrests and allegations of police brutality.

The protests involved several unrelated groups and participants have called the movement "faceless". One organizer of the protest was a Sierra Leonean living in the Netherlands known by the pseudonym Adebayor, who spread messages via WhatsApp. Protestors gathered since 8 August before protests escalated. The national security coordinator wrote to the armed forces to prepare to back up police. Sierra Leone had been relatively stable for years and the level of unrest was considered unusual for the country.

== Events ==
In Freetown, violent protests broke out on Wednesday, 10 August 2022 at around 10:30 AM. Protestors threw rocks and set fires. They voiced opposition to President Julius Maada Bio, chanting "Bio must go." Police employed tear gas and guns. The civilian death toll on Wednesday was thirteen in Freetown, four in Kamakwie, and four in Makeni; the police death toll was two in Freetown, three in Kamakwie, and two in Makeni. The internet observatory NetBlocks noted that Sierra Leone experienced internet shutdowns for two hours in the afternoon and overnight. Vice President Mohamed Juldeh Jalloh announced a nationwide curfew of 3 PM while the president was out of the country.

On Thursday, 11 August, the death toll increased. Police instated a second curfew from 7 PM to 7 AM.

Protests continued on Friday. Freetown remained under curfew. Police and armed forces continued to patrol streets in the following week.

== Government response ==
In an interview with BBC Radio 1, President Julius Maada Bio expressed his condolences for those who died in the conflict, but denounced the protests, referring to them as "terrorism". He blamed the violence on Sierra Leoneans living abroad. In an address to the nation on the Friday following the protests, he said "This was not a protest against the high cost of living occasioned by the ongoing global economic crisis. The chant of the insurrectionists was for a violent overthrow of the democratically elected government."

In a video address, Vice President Mohamed Juldeh Jalloh said of the protestors, "These unscrupulous individuals have embarked on a violent and unauthorised protest which has led to the loss of lives of innocent Sierra Leoneans, including security personnel." The country's information minister, Mohamed Swarray, said that "Wednesday’s riot was a well-machinated act to remove a legitimate government."

== Aftermath ==
The protests resulted in 515 arrests, including for the killings of a police officer in Freetown and another in Makeni, for arson in Kamakwie, and for about 200 curfew violations.

Killed police officers were buried on 24 August in a state funeral attended by President Bio, and their families received 100 million Sierra Leonean leones. On 17 October, the bodies of non-police victims were released and were given a public burial in the central mortuary of Freetown. Their families were offered 20 million leones but were not given the choice to bury the victims. Amnesty International has demanded Sierra Leonean authorities to be held accountable.

== See also ==
- 2022 in Sierra Leone
- 2022 Sierra Leone doctors strike
