= 2024 in Sierra Leone =

- Decades: 2000s; 2010s; 2020s
- See also: Other events of 2024; Timeline of Sierra Leonean history

Events in the year 2024 in Sierra Leone.

== Incumbents ==
- President: Julius Maada Bio
- Vice President: Mohamed Juldeh Jalloh
- Chief Minister of Sierra Leone: David Moinina Sengeh

== Events ==
- 3 January – 2023 Sierra Leone coup attempt: A court in Freetown charges former president Ernest Bai Koroma with four offences, including treason for his alleged role during the coup attempt.
- 7 April – President Julius Maada Bio declares a state of national emergency following an increase in illegal drug usage, particularly kush, in the country.
- 2 July – President Julius Maada Bio signs into law a bill banning child marriage. The law becomes official on 5 July.
- 23 July – Eleven people are convicted and sentenced to prison for their role in the 2023 Sierra Leone coup attempt, with Amadu Koita Makalo, a bodyguard of former president Ernest Bai Koroma receiving a 182-year sentence for being the "mastermind" of the coup.
- 9 August – Twenty-four soldiers are convicted and sentenced to prison by a court-martial for their role in the 2023 Sierra Leone coup attempt, with Lieutenant Colonel Charles James Mishek Yamba, the highest ranking defendant, receiving a 120-year sentence.
- 16 September – At least ten people are killed in a building collapse in Freetown.
- 5 December – A nationwide vaccination campaign is launched against Ebola.

== Holidays ==
- 1 January - New Year's Day
- 18 February – Armed Forces Day
- 29 March – Good Friday
- 1 April - Easter Monday
- 10 April - Korité
- 27 April - Independence Day
- 1 May - International Workers' Day
- 16 June – Tabaski
- 16 September – The Prophet's Birthday
- 25 December - Christmas Day
- 26 December - Boxing Day
