= 2021 in Sierra Leone =

- Decades: 2000s; 2010s; 2020s
- See also: Other events of 2021; Timeline of Sierra Leonean history

Events in the year 2021 in Sierra Leone.

== Incumbents ==
- President of Sierra Leone Julius Maada Bio

== Events ==
- Freetown fuel tanker explosion
- COVID-19 pandemic in Sierra Leone
