= Freetown explosion =

Freetown explosion may refer to:

- 2007 Freetown explosions
- Freetown fuel tanker explosion in 2021
