= Alpha Kanu =

Sierra Leonean politician

Honourable Alhaji Alpha Kanu J.D.

special adviser to the President
- Incumbent
- Assumed office January 21, 2013
- President: Ernest Bai Koroma
- Preceded by: Ibrahim Ben Kargbo

Sierra Leone Minister of Presidential and Public Affairs
- In office December 3, 2010 – January 21, 2013

Spokesman of the All People's Congress (APC)
- Incumbent
- Assumed office 2007

Sierra Leone Minister of Natural Resources
- In office February 27, 2009 – December 3, 2010
- Preceded by: Alhaji Abubakarr Jalloh
- Succeeded by: Alhaji Minkailu Mansaray

Sierra Leone Minister of Presidential and Public Affairs
- In office October 14, 2007 – February 29, 2009

Member of Parliament of Sierra Leone from Port Loko District
- In office 2002–2007

Personal details
- Born: Alhaji Alpha Sahid Bakar Kanu Port Loko District, Sierra Leone
- Party: All People's Congress (APC)
- Education: Fourah Bay College University of Nottingham
- Profession: mining engineer

Alhaji Alpha Sahid Bakar Kanu is a Sierra Leonean politician and the current Sierra Leone minister of Presidential and Public Affairs. He is also the official spokesman of the All People's Congress (APC) political party, a position he has held even before the APC came to power. In January 2012, Kanu was chosen by Sierra Leone president Ernest Bai Koroma to serve as Minister of Information and Communication in Koroma's new second term cabinet.

Kanu is a close personal friend of president Ernest Bai Koroma; he is also one of the closest and most trusted political advisors to president Koroma. Kanu is often seen together with president Ernest Bai Koroma in public.

Kanu had served as Sierra Leone Minister of Mines and Natural Resources from February 27, 2009, before he was moved again to Sierra Leone minister of Presidential and Public Affairs in a Cabinet reshuffled on December 3, 2010 by president Koroma. Kanu was an elected member of Sierra Leone House of Parliament representing Port Loko District from 2002 until 2007.

Kanu is a mining engineer by profession. He graduated with a Master of Philosophy (M.Phil.) in geophysics from the University of Nottingham in the United Kingdom.

Kanu is a muslim and a member of the Temne ethnic group from Port Loko District in northern Sierra Leone.

== Early life and education ==
Alhaji Alpha Sahid Bakar Kanu was born in Port Loko District in the Northern Province of Sierra Leone of Loko and Temne parentage. Kanu attended the St. Francis Secondary in Makeni and graduated as a Science student. Upon graduation, he attended Fourah Bay College in Freetown and later proceeded to the University of Nottingham in the United Kingdom where he received a Master of Philosophy (M.Phil.) in geophysics.

== Career ==
Upon his return to Sierra Leone, Kanu was employed as a mining engineer at the National Diamond Mining Company (NDMC) based in Kono District for about four years, before he proceeded to lecture at the Fourah Bay College in Freetown.

After he left his lecturing profession, Kanu was appointed as head of the department of commercial enterprises where he worked for four years.

== Political career ==
In 2002, Kanu ran for a seat in the Parliament of Sierra Leone from his home district of Port Loko in the 2002 Sierra Leone Parliamentary Election. He won the seat as a member of the opposition All People's Congress (APC). While in Parliament Kanu was one of the fierce critics of Ahmad Tejan Kabbah lead Sierra Leone People's Party (SLPP) government. Kanu was one of the most senior members of the APC to publicly declare his support for Ernest Bai Koroma during Koroma battle with longtime APC leader Edward Turay for the APC Leadership in 2002. When Koroma was stripped of the APC leadership by the Supreme Court of Sierra Leone in 2005, Kanu spoke against the members of the party that took the case to the supreme court and fought very hard for Koroma to again win the APC leadership. He was the spokesman of the APC, then an opposition party during the 2007 election.

=== Cabinet positions ===
When Ernest Bai Koroma was elected president in 2007, Kanu was appointed Minister of Presidential and Public Affairs from October 2007 to February 2009 when he was moved to the Ministry of Mineral Resources. In December 2009, Kanu was again appointed Minister of Presidential and Public Affairs.
