= Stephen Omollo =

Kenyan humanitarian

- Born: Stephen Omollo; 22 August 1968 (age 58); Nairobi, Kenya
- Education: Royal College of Surgeons (International Diploma in Humanitarian Assistance); University of Lucknow (Bachelor of Commerce); Lancaster University (Masters in Management); INSEAD (International Masters in Practicing Management); University of York (PhD in Political Science)
- Known for: Leader; Humanitarian
- Notable work: East Africa Regional Director, World Vision (2017–2021); Red Cross (1993–2017); CEO at Plan International (2022–2024)

Stephen Omollo (born 22 August 1968), is a Kenyan humanitarian and leader.

Stephen served as Assistant Executive Director at World Food Programme, responsible for the workplace and management, from June 2024 until September 2026. Prior to appointment, between November 2021 and April 2024, Stephen was the chief executive officer of Plan International. He had served as the East Africa Regional Director at the World Vision International, from September 2017 to October 2021.

Stephen previously served continuously for 24 years in different positions in the Red Cross organizations, between 1993 and 2017. As a humanitarian working for Red Cross, Stephen served in onsite programs for various refugee camps in different African regions including East Africa, Central Africa, Southern Africa and West Africa.

== Early life and education ==
Stephen was born on 22 August 1968. He grew up and spent his formative years in Uganda and completed his elementary and secondary education in Kenya. Stephen began his graduate studies in 1988 at the University of Lucknow in India. He earned a bachelor's degree in commerce in 1992. Since 1999, Stephen has held a postgraduate certificate from the Royal College of Surgeons in Ireland, known as the International Diploma in Humanitarian Assistance (I.D.H.A.).

Stephen also enrolled in Lancaster University in England in 1999 to pursue a postgraduate degree, and he earned a master's in management there in 2003. Additionally, since 2003, INSEAD in France has awarded him a postgraduate certificate in International Masters in Practicing Management. Stephen continued his enrollment at the University of York in England in 2006 in order to pursue a PhD in political science.

== Career ==
After earning a bachelor's degree in commerce from Lucknow University in India in 1992, Stephen began working for Red Cross Kenya—a.k.a. the International Red Cross and Red Crescent Movement in Kenya—as a humanitarian coordinator for the program for Somali refugees in northeastern of Kenya. He held this role until January 1994. Subsequently, Stephen began working with Irish Red Cross and he was appointed as Camps Manager in Benaco,Tanzania in Congolese refugees. Stephen received a promotion in January 1997 and was assigned to the position of country director and representative for Irish Red Cross in Uganda, based in Kampala.

Stephen began his career with the International Federation of Red Cross and Red Crescent Societies (IFRC) in February 2000. He began as the region's humanitarian coordinator for Southern Africa and rose to the position of deputy regional director for the same area, a position he held until June 2003. Later on, Stephen worked for the IFRC in Zambia (2003–2006) and Zimbabwe (2009–2010) as the country director and secretary general representative.

In August 2006, Stephen held the new role at the IFRC as the regional director for Western Africa and Central Africa until December 2007. From March 2010 to April 2014, he served as the IFRC's Permanent Representative and head of the Africa Union Office in Addis Ababa. Stephen served as the IFRC's Chief for Humanitarian Diplomacy and Global Director of Partnerships and Resource Development in Geneva, Swiss from April 2014 to August 2017. From September 2017 to October 2021, Stephen served as a vice president and regional director for Eastern Africa at World Vision International. Stephen joined and took over Anne-Birgitte Albrectsen's position as CEO of Plan International in November 2021, she had held the position since 2015.

== Additional career ==
=== Board of directorships ===
- Board of Directors, Partnership for Maternal, Newborn & Child Health(PMNCH), (2022-)
- Board of Directors, Generation Unlimited, (2022-)
- Board of Directors, International Civil Society Centre (ICSC), (2022-)

== Other considerations ==
From January 2008 to February 2009, Stephen served as special advisor to Kamalesh Sharma while he was the Secretary General of the Commonwealth, Stephen, was also director of Good Offices responsible for mediation and conflict resolution at the Commonwealth. On 20 December 2023, on the International Day of Human Solidarity, Stephen Omollo with Chido Mpemba and Chernor Bah, released an article in Devex news named Africa’s youth will change the world order. Are we ready? An article which elucidates the narrative of how Africa's young population will transform the international order in multilateral systems.

== See also ==
- Plan International
