= 2007 Koidu-Sefadu protest =

21st century Sierra Leonean protest

The 2007 Koidu-Sefadu protest was a protest by 400 Sierra Leoneans in the town of Koidu-Sefadu in Eastern Province. The protest was aimed at the local diamond mine which the residents claimed to have harmed both them and the local environment. The result of the protest was a clampdown by Sierra Leonean police and the death of 2 protesters.

== Background ==
Sierra Leoneans had flocked to the country's largest mine after the election of Ernest Bai Koroma in September 2007. On 12 December, the government removed the miners after it was agreed that the miners could keep any diamonds uncovered during their work.

== 14 December ==
On 14 December, local police were ordered into the mine area to protect the Koidu Holdings company which runs the mine. Protesters had gathered at the gate, seeking housing and increased compensation for their sufferings. The police used live ammunition and tear gas to disperse the protesters, killing two and injuring eight others.

== Official reaction ==
On the issue of resettlement of displaced villagers, Minister of Mineral Resources Alhaji Abubakarr Jalloh said the "company is relatively slow in building the resettlement". Minister Jalloh also sought for the miners to leave the area. President Koroma temporarily halted diamond mining across the country as a result of the incident.

== See also ==
- 2007 in Sierra Leone

== Sources ==
- S. Leone halts mining after 2 die in diamond riots Reuters, 14 December 2007
