= 2020 in Sierra Leone =

- Decades: 2000s; 2010s; 2020s
- See also: Other events of 2020; Timeline of Sierra Leonean history

Events in the year 2020 in Sierra Leone.

== Incumbents ==
- President: Julius Maada Bio

== Events ==
- 31 March – First confirmed case of COVID-19 in Sierra Leone
- 23 December – After serving time in Rwanda for war crimes since 2009, former Revolutionary United Front (RUF) leader Augustine Gbao, 72, is returned to Blama to serve the remainder of his 25-year sentence.

== Deaths ==
- 5 March – Solomon Berewa, politician, Vice-President (b. 1938).
- 21 March – Eldred D. Jones, literary critic (b. 1925).
- 18 May – Minkailu Bah, politician.
- 18 July – Baba Ibrahim Suma-Keita, long-distance runner (b. 1947).

== See also ==
- COVID-19 pandemic in Sierra Leone
- 2020 in West Africa
