= 2007 Paramount Airlines Mil Mi-8 crash =

2007 helicopter accident

Coordinates: 08°36′59.20″N 13°11′43.76″W

2007 Paramount Airlines helicopter crash
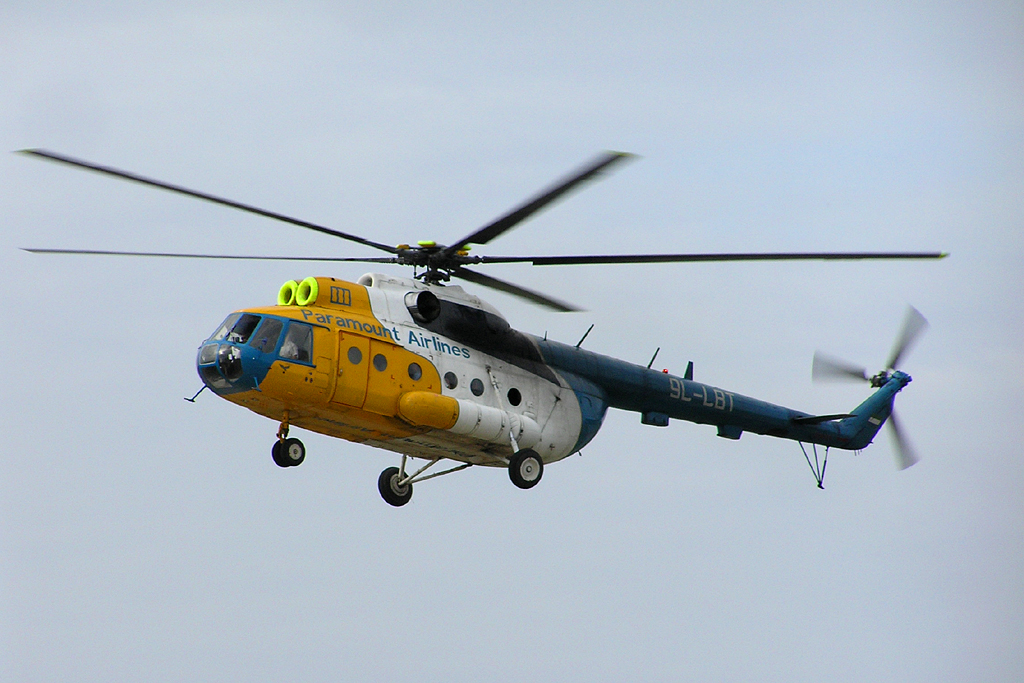
- 9L-LBT, the aircraft involved in the accident.

Accident
- Date: 3 June 2007
- Summary: Mechanical failure
- Site: Lungi, Sierra Leone

Aircraft
- Aircraft type: Mil Mi-8
- Operator: Paramount Airlines
- Registration: 9L-LBT
- Occupants: 23
- Passengers: 21
- Crew: 2
- Fatalities: 22
- Injuries: 1
- Survivors: 1

On 3 June 2007 a Mil Mi-8 helicopter operated by Paramount Airlines crashed near Lungi International Airport in Sierra Leone, killing 22 people.

== Background ==
In 2007, helicopter, hovercraft, and sea ferry were the only practical ways to travel between the airport and the capital, Freetown, which are separated by the Sierra Leone River as it meets the Atlantic Ocean.

The passengers on board were Togolese football fans who were returning from watching their national team play that of Sierra Leone, and the two pilots were of Ukrainian origin. The passengers had chartered the aircraft specifically for the flight.

== Crash and emergency response ==
According to an eyewitness, both pilots jumped out immediately prior to the crash. Later reports stated that 22 were killed, and that the Russian copilot was the only survivor.

The aircraft caught fire upon impact and was destroyed before firefighters were able to extinguish the flames.

According to airport witnesses the firefighters did not attend the scene until 40 minutes after the crash. The firefighter who had the keys to the fire truck was not at his station in the airport at the time. Airport staff had to douse the flames with buckets of water.

== Investigation ==
Togo sent a six-person delegation to help investigate the crash, as most of the dead were Togolese football fans visiting for an African Cup of Nations qualifying match on Sunday. They included Togolese Minister of Sports Richard Attipoe.

Sierra Leone's Minister of transport and communications Dr Prince Harding as well as the two top aviation officials in the country lost their jobs as a result of the crash and a commission of enquiry was set up.
