= List of Sierra Leonean actors =

This is a list of notable actors and actresses from Sierra Leone. This list includes members of the Sierra Leonean diaspora.

== A ==
- Franklyn Ajaye

== B ==
- Wendy Bangura
- Nzinga Blake

== C ==
- Brian Conteh
- Sarah Culberson

== D ==
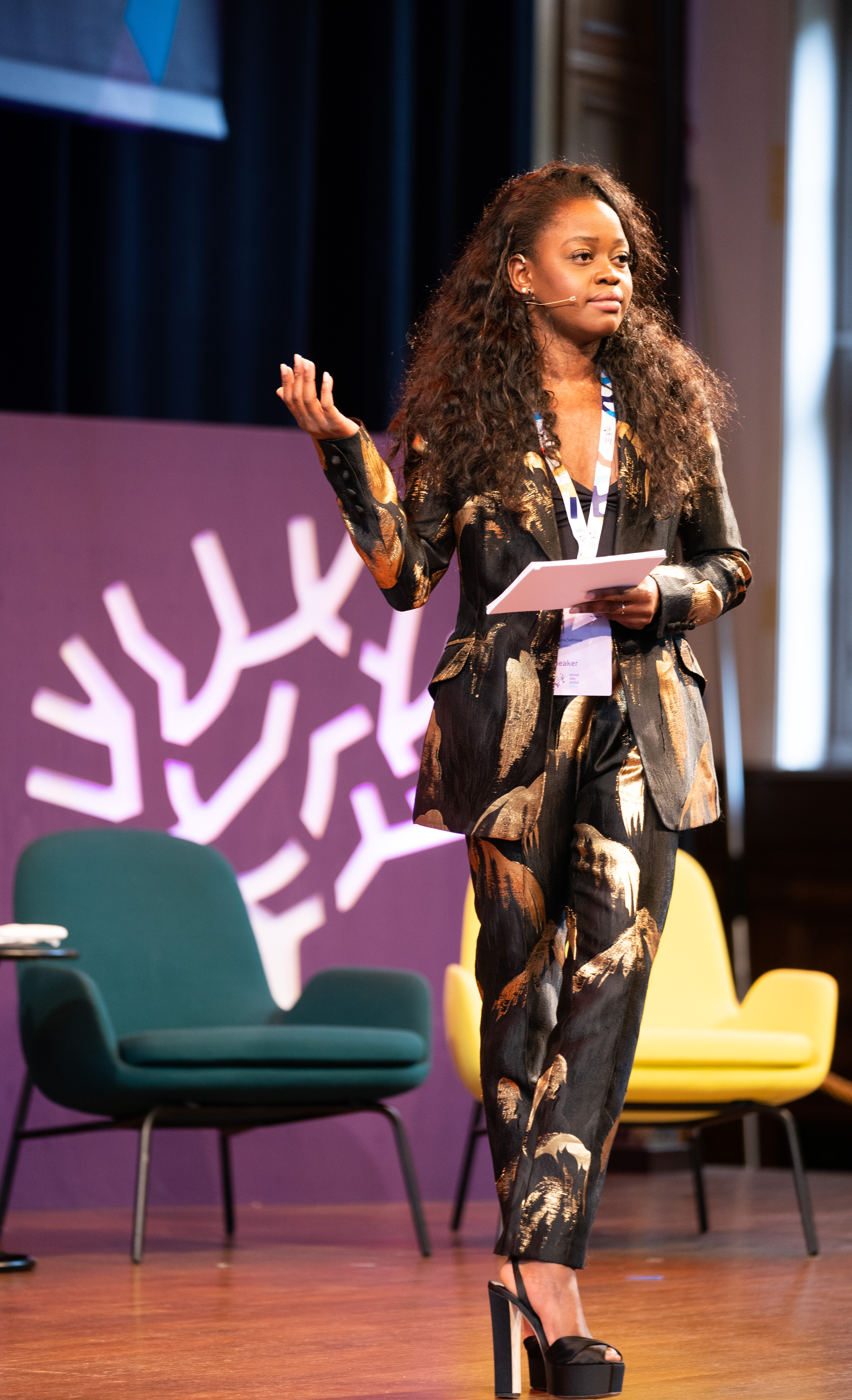
Michaela DePrince, 2019

- Michaela DePrince

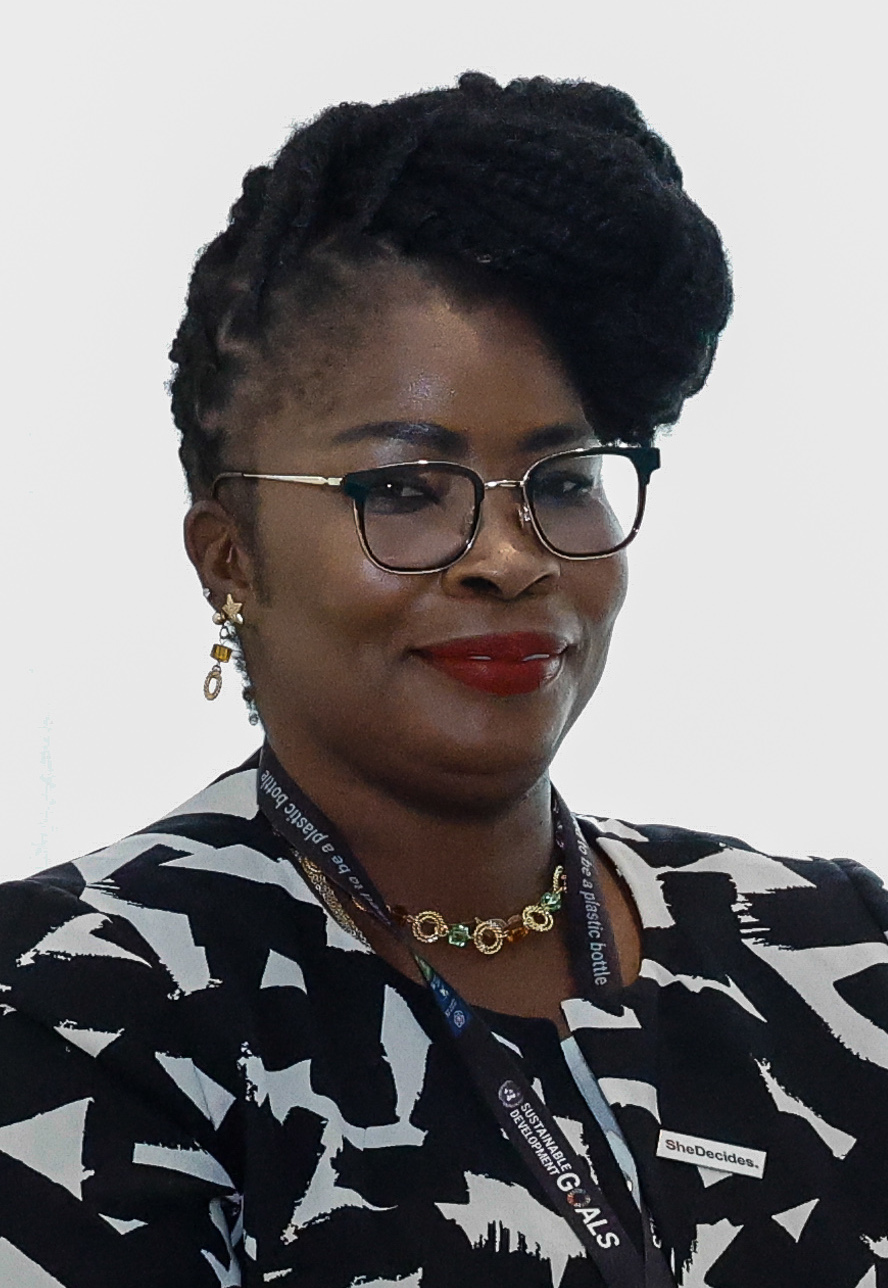
Isata Mahoi, 2026

== E ==
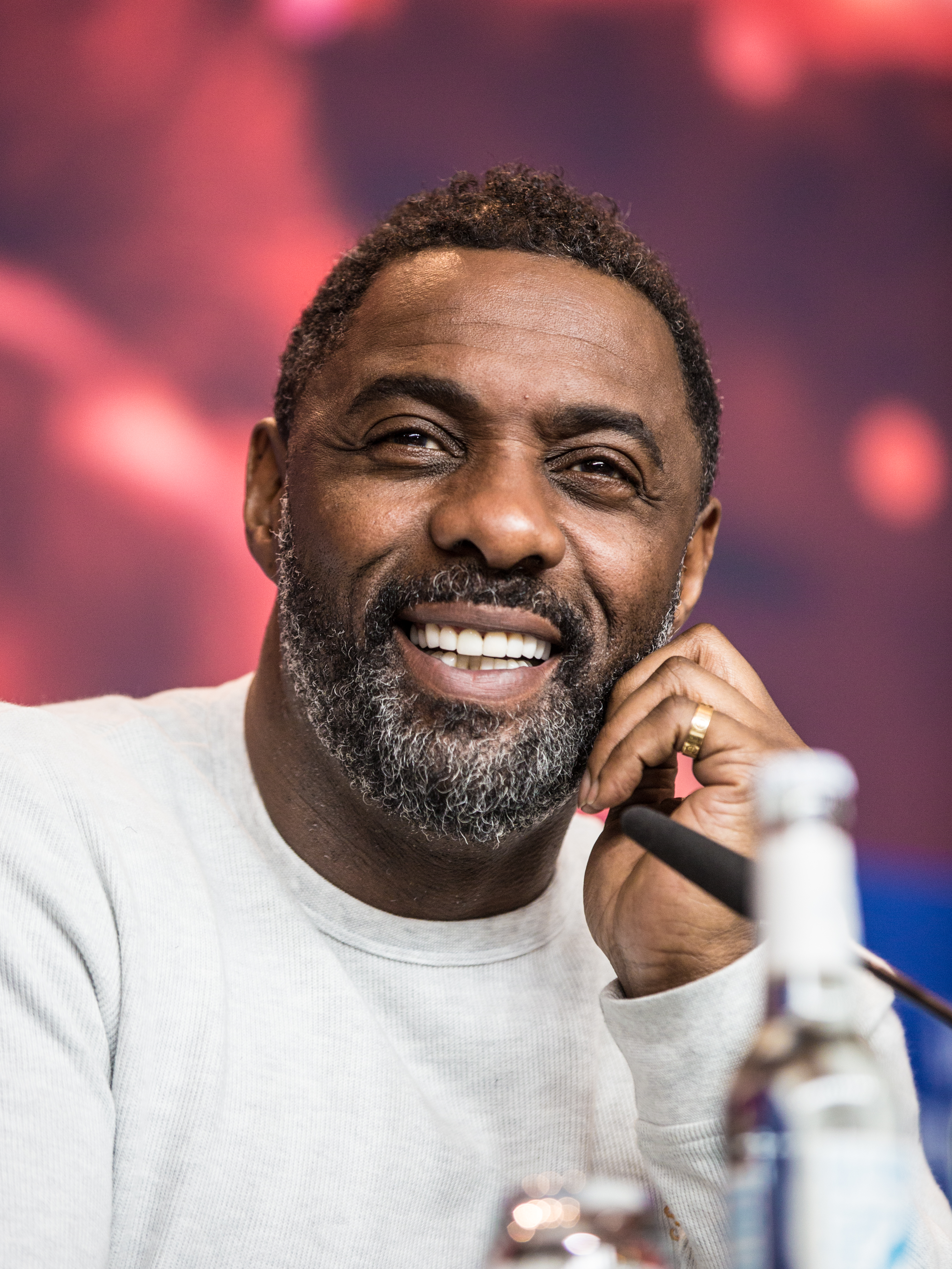
Idris Elba, 2018

- Jeillo Edwards
- Idris Elba

== F ==
- Desmond Finney

== J ==
- Fatima Jabbe-Bio
- Zainab Jah
- Enid Jones-Boston

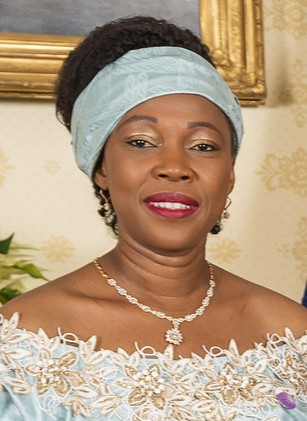
Fatima Jabbe-Bio, 2022

== K ==
- Peter A. A. Komba

== M ==
- Adetokumboh M'Cormack
- Cornelius Macarthy
- Isata Mahoi
- Henrietta Mbawah

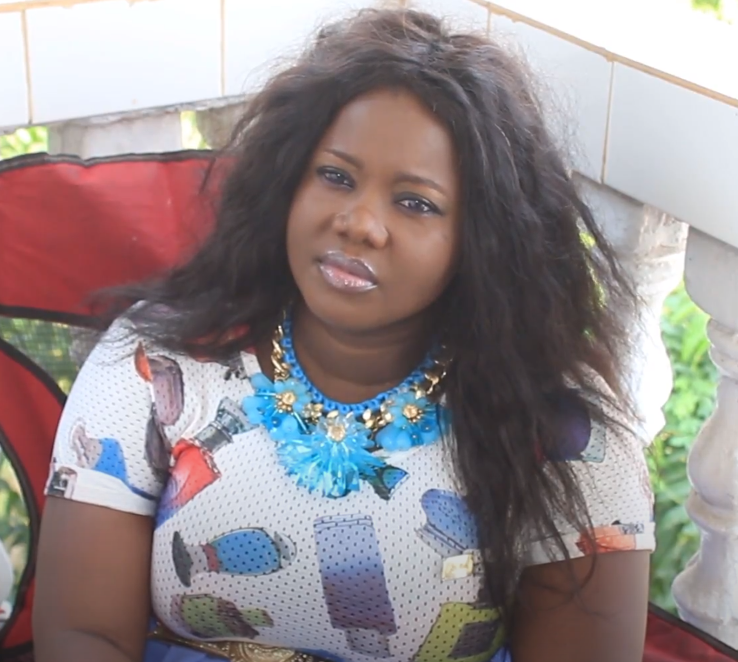
Henrietta Mbawah, 2018

== T ==
- Ellen Thomas

== W ==
- Isaiah Washington

== See also ==
- List of Sierra Leoneans
- Cinema of Sierra Leone
