= 2018 in Sierra Leone =

- Decades: 1990s; 2000s; 2010s; 2020s
- See also: Other events of 2018; Timeline of Sierra Leonean history

Events in the year 2018 in Sierra Leone.

== Incumbents ==
- President: Ernest Bai Koroma (until 4 April); Julius Maada Bio (from 4 April)

== Events ==
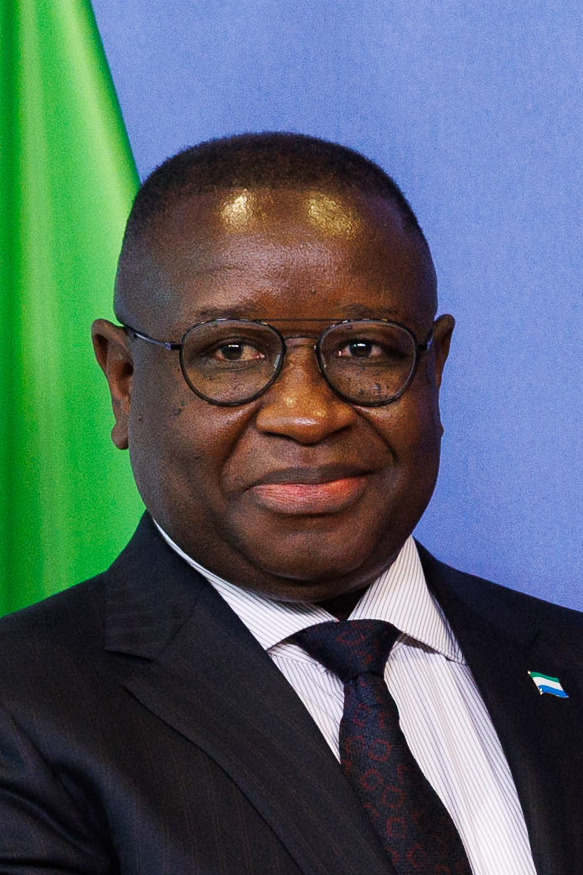
Julius Maada Bio, new president

- 7 March – Sierra Leonean general election, 2018
- 4 April – Julius Maada Bio took over as new president of Sierra Leone

== Deaths ==
- 2 April – Ahmed Janka Nabay, musician (b. 1964).
