= 1999 in Sierra Leone =

- Decades: 1970s; 1980s; 1990s; 2000s; 2010s
- See also: Other events of 1999; Timeline of Sierra Leonean history

The following lists events that happened during 1999 in Sierra Leone.

== Incumbents ==
- President: Ahmad Tejan Kabbah
- Vice-President: Albert Joe Demby
- Chief Justice: Desmond Edgar Luke

== Events ==
=== January ===
- January 1 - ECOMOG succeeds in the battle with rebels in Port Loko.
- January 3 - Reports emerge that refugees have come under attack due to clashes between government and rebel forces in the camps.
- January 4 - The Nigerian-led ECOMOG began attacking rebels near Freetown.
- January 6 - Rebels and government forces continue to clash over the capital of Freetown. The United Kingdom encourages their citizens to leave Sierra Leone.

=== August ===
- August 9 - The AFRC rebels release 19 of their hostages.

=== September ===
- September 6 - Nigeria announces plans to withdraw their peacekeepers by next month.
