= 2005 in Sierra Leone =

- Decades: 1980s; 1990s; 2000s; 2010s; 2020s
- See also: Other events of 2005; Timeline of Sierra Leonean history

The following list is of events that happened during 2005 in Sierra Leone. Sierra Leone, a country in West Africa, has a special significance in the history of the transatlantic slave trade as the departure point for thousands of west African captives. The capital, Freetown, was founded as a home for repatriated former slaves in 1787. But the country's modern history has been overshadowed by a brutal civil war that ended in 2002 with the help of Britain, the former colonial power, and a large United Nations peacekeeping mission. Sierra Leone has experienced substantial economic growth in recent years, although the ruinous effects of the civil war continue to be felt. The country is also rich in diamonds and other minerals. The trade in illicit gems, known as "blood diamonds" for their role in funding conflicts, perpetuated the civil war. The government has sought to crack down on the trade.

== Incumbents ==
- President: Ahmad Tejan Kabbah
- Vice-President: Solomon Ekuma Berewa
- Chief Justice: Ade Renner Thomas (now Abdulai Hamid Charm)

== Events ==
=== March ===
- March 7 - Three members of the former military government, Armed Forces Revolutionary Council, go on trial accused of crimes against humanity during the civil war.

=== November ===
- November 7 - Sierra Leone Health and Sanitation, Abator Thomas says that polio has been eradicated in the country, following a successful immunization program.

=== December ===
- The last UN peacekeeping forces leave the country
