= Wellington, Freetown =

Wellington
- Location within Sierra Leone
- Coordinates: 8.442081°N 13.170929°W
- Country: Sierra Leone
- City: Freetown
- District: Western Area Urban District

Wellington is a residential neighborhood in the East End of Freetown, Sierra Leone. It is part of the Western Area Urban District. Wellington is densely populated, with an ethnically diverse population.

Wellington is home to is several industrial estate, and several minor industries found in the country. These include the Sierra Leone Brewery Limited, Marika Palm Kernel Enterprises, etc.

In 2021, it was the location of the Freetown fuel tanker explosion.

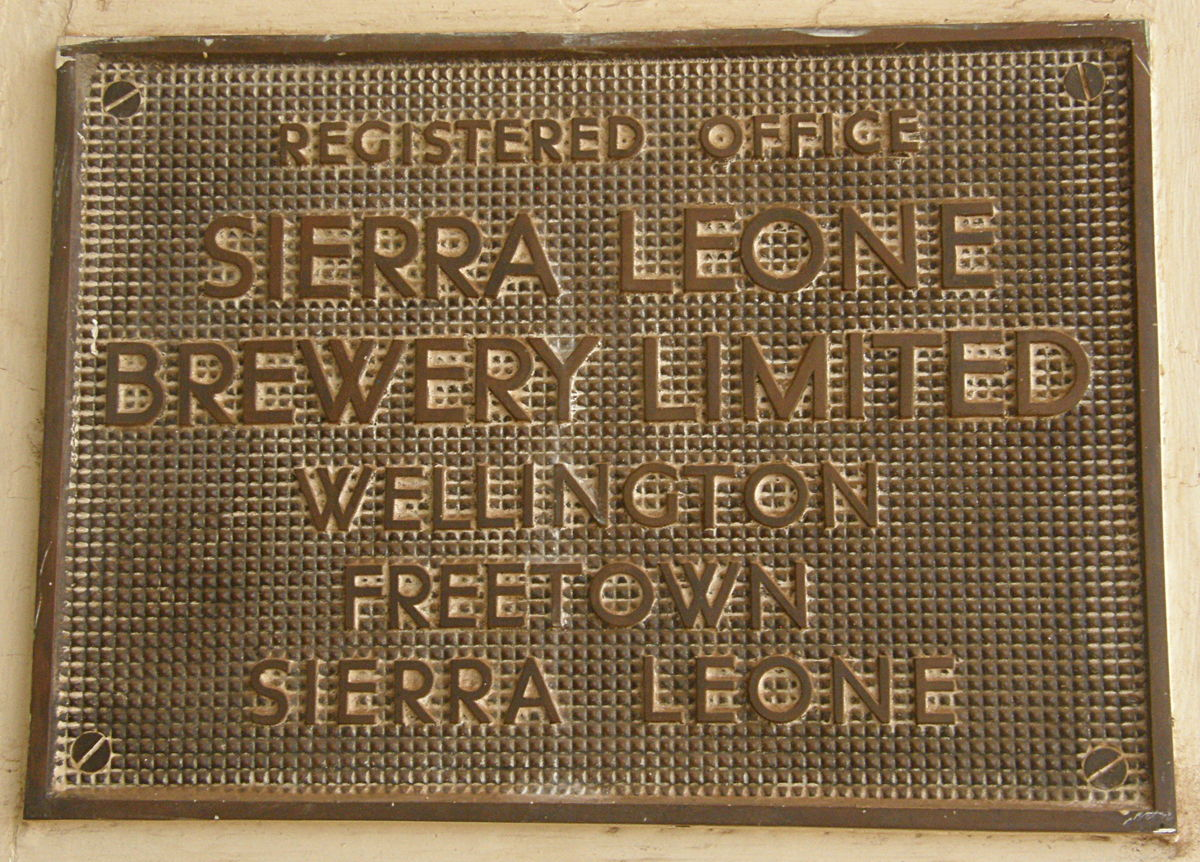
Sierra Leone Brewery Limited Plaque
