= 1998 in Sierra Leone =

- Decades: 1970s; 1980s; 1990s; 2000s; 2010s
- See also: Other events of 1998; Timeline of Sierra Leonean history

The following lists events that happened during 1998 in Sierra Leone.

== Incumbents ==
- President: Ahmad Tejan Kabbah (starting February 13)
- Vice-President: Albert Joe Demby
- Chief Justice: Desmond Edgar Luke

== Events ==
=== February ===
- February 12 - Fighting between Nigerian troops and the military government of Sierra Leone now reach Freetown.

=== October ===
- October 12 - 23 men and 1 woman are publicly shot at a stone quarry for partaking in a coup the year prior.
