= 2006 in Sierra Leone =

- Decades: 1980s; 1990s; 2000s; 2010s; 2020s
- See also: Other events of 2006; Timeline of Sierra Leonean history

The following lists events that happened during 2006 in Sierra Leone.

== Incumbents ==
- President: Ahmad Tejan Kabbah
- Vice-President: Solomon Ekuma Berewa
- Chief Justice: Ade Renner Thomas

== Events ==
=== March ===
- March 28 - Former Liberian President Charles Taylor disappears after Nigeria agrees to extradite him to face war crime charges in Sierra Leone.
- March 29 - Charles Taylor is captured after disappearing in Nigeria and is extradited to Sierra Leone.

=== June ===
- June 15 - The United Kingdom agrees to jail Charles Taylor if he is convicted, removing a key obstacle to a proposed trial to be held at The Hague under the auspices of the Special Court for Sierra Leone.
