= Freetown fuel tanker explosion =

2021 explosion in Freetown, Sierra Leone

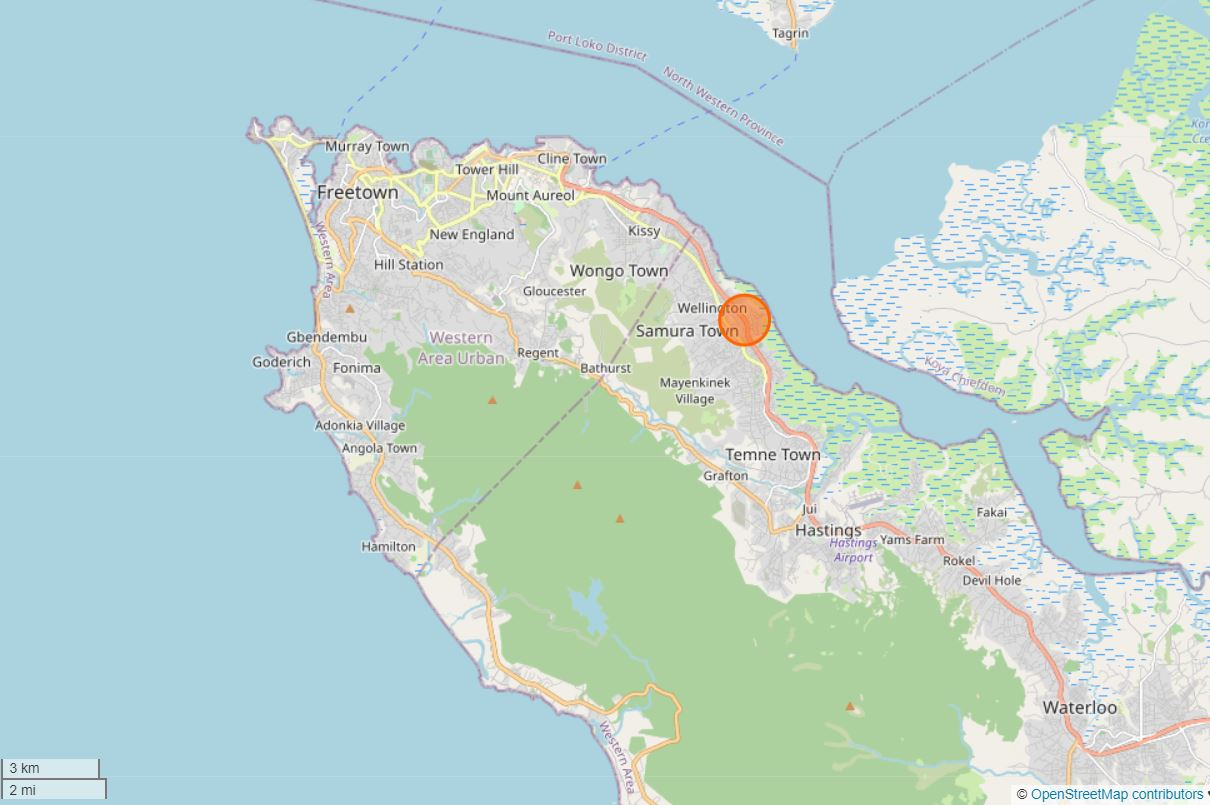
- Date: 5 November 2021
- Time: c. 22:00 GMT (UTC±0)
- Location: Wellington, Freetown, Sierra Leone; 8°26′39″N 13°09′42″W
- Type: Fuel tanker explosion
- Cause: Collision between a fuel tanker and a lorry
- Deaths: 154
- Injuries: 304
- Property damage: 22 Vehicles; 48 motorbikes

On 5 November 2021 a collision between a petrol fuel tanker and a lorry at a busy junction of Sierra Leone's capital, Freetown, resulted in an explosion and a fire that caused 154 deaths and 304 injuries, overwhelming the city's medical services.

== Background ==
Freetown is the capital and largest city of Sierra Leone, with a population of more than 1.2 million people. The accident occurred at a busy intersection along Bai Bureh Road in the neighbourhood of Wellington, Freetown's main industrial district. The intersection where the accident occurred is popularly known as PMB, short for the Sierra Leone Produce Marketing Board (SLPMB), a defunct parastatal whose old factory buildings are located adjacent the intersection.

== Event ==
At approximately 22:00 GMT on 5 November 2021, a fuel tanker carrying petrol attempted to make a turn outside Choithram Supermarket in the Freetown suburb of Wellington. A lorry reportedly carrying granite collided with the tanker at the junction, causing a fuel leak. The two drivers came out of their vehicles and warned community residents to stay off the scene, according to Sierra Leone's National Disaster Management Agency.

Petrol spilled from the tanker and locals, particularly okada riders, attempted to collect it in containers. An explosion led to a huge fireball that engulfed vehicles, people and passengers that were stuck in traffic created by the initial collision.

The mayor of Freetown, Yvonne Aki-Sawyerr, said that the damage was exacerbated by people who gathered at the lorry, scooped the leaking fuel in containers and placed them in close proximity to the crash scene. This created traffic chaos with many people, including passengers in cars and buses, stuck very close to the scene of the accident.

== Victims ==
Many of the victims were trapped in vehicles, including a bus full of people which was intensely burnt, killing all inside. Nearby shops and markets caught fire after fuel spilled onto the streets. Footage broadcast by local media outlets showed charred bodies surrounding the tanker. At least 99 people were initially confirmed to have been killed in the disaster, and more than 100 others were injured. The death toll rose to 131 five days after the explosion and reached 151 by 6 December.

== Aftermath ==
The Directorate of the National Disaster Management Agency (NDMA), issued a statement confirming that the injured had been transferred to hospitals and the bodies had been collected. They added that rescue efforts at the scene had ended by 16:45 GMT on 6 November. Several people are in critical condition. According to a staff member at Connaught Hospital's intensive care unit, about 30 severely burned victims taken to the unit were not expected to survive. Sierra Leone's president Julius Maada Bio, who was attending the United Nations climate talks in Glasgow, Scotland, offered condolences and promised support to the victims' families. The country's vice president Mohamed Juldeh Jalloh visited two of the hospitals where some of the victims were taken to for treatment, but it was later reported that the hospital services had been completely overwhelmed. On 8 November those who died during the explosion were buried in a mass ceremony in Waterloo, on the outskirts of Freetown. President Bio declared a three-day national mourning and ordered all flags to be flown at half-mast, and indicated that a task force will be set up to look into what happened, and will provide recommendations that will help to avoid similar tragedies in the future.

The event has been described as first of its kind in the densely populated city of about 1.2 million and follows a number of similar high-casualty fuel tanker explosions across sub-Saharan Africa where fuel spilled was viewed as wasteful in communities where many struggled to afford petrol. Mass casualties from similar events have occurred in the 2018 Mbuba tanker explosion in the Democratic Republic of Congo that killed 50 and the 2019 Morogoro explosion in Tanzania that killed 85.
