= 2015 in Sierra Leone =

- Decades: 1990s; 2000s; 2010s; 2020s
- See also: Other events of 2015; Timeline of Sierra Leonean history

The following lists events that happened during 2015 in Sierra Leone.

== Incumbents ==
- President: Ernest Bai Koroma
- Vice President: Samuel Sam-Sumana (until March 17), Victor Bockarie Foh (starting March 17)

== Events ==
=== February ===
- 13 February - Sierra Leone quarantines 700 homes in the Aberdeen district of Freetown following the death of a fisherman.

=== March ===
- 14 March - After an armed band removed his personal security guards, the Vice President of Sierra Leone, Samuel Sam-Sumana, goes into hiding after applying for asylum at the United States embassy in Freetown.
