= 1961 in Sierra Leone =

- Decades: 1940s; 1950s; 1960s; 1970s; 1980s
- See also: Other events of 1961; Timeline of Sierra Leonean history

The following lists events that happened during 1961 in Sierra Leone.

== Incumbents ==
- Monarch: Elizabeth II (starting 27 April)
- Governor-General: Maurice Henry Dorman (starting 27 April)
- Prime Minister: Milton Margai (starting 27 April)

== Events ==
=== April ===
- April 27 - Sierra Leone gains its independence from Britain as a Commonwealth realm with Queen Elizabeth II as Queen of Sierra Leone.
