= 2023 Sierra Leone coup attempt =

Militant assault on a barracks and a prison in Sierra Leone

2023 Freetown attacks
- Part of 2023 Sierra Leone coup plot
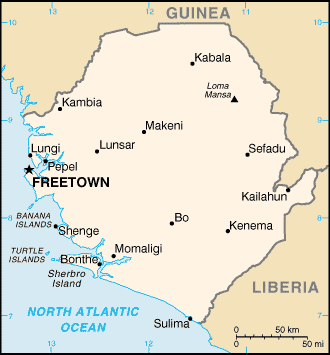
- Location of Freetown in Sierra Leone
Date	26–28 November 2023 (2 days)
Location	Freetown, Sierra Leone 8°29′4″N 13°14′4″W
Status	Armoury attack repelled; Prison escape successful; National curfew imposed

Belligerents
Sierra Leone: Republic of Sierra Leone Armed Forces; Sierra Leone Police	Dissident military officers, unidentified militants and prisoners

Commanders and leaders
Julius Maada Bio	Unknown

Strength
Unknown	Unknown

Casualties and losses
14 soldiers, 1 police officer, 1 prison guard killed 8 soldiers injured	3 attackers killed 80 arrested
- 1 civilian, 1 private security employee killed

On 26 November 2023, a group of militants attacked several locations in Freetown, the capital of Sierra Leone. The country was subsequently placed under a nationwide curfew, with a manhunt being called to find the militants. President Julius Maada Bio claimed the attack was repelled by the security forces and said the government was in control of the situation. The attacks were described by international organizations as attempts to disrupt constitutional order in the country, and by information minister Chernor Bah as an "attempted coup".

== Background ==
The attacks came amid political tensions brought about by the reelection of President Julius Maada Bio in June 2023 which was disputed by the opposition and raised concerns from the United States and the European Union. In August, there were reports of a coup plot, which led to the arrest of several soldiers.

== Events ==
At around 4:30 in the morning of 26 November 2023, a group of militants attacked the military armoury at the Wilberforce barracks in Freetown, Sierra Leone, close to the presidential residence. Later the same morning, they broke into Central Pademba Road Prison in Freetown, releasing nearly its entire population of 1,890 inmates after the security forces retreated from the area. Some of the inmates were reportedly seen walking around the Brookfields neighborhood. Another prison was also attacked by the militants. A Reuters correspondent saw cell doors forced open or removed entirely during a visit to Pademba prison after the jailbreak, with the head of the country's correctional services saying that the attackers rammed a vehicle through the prison's front gate after failing to open it with a rocket launcher. At least 100 inmates later reported back to their prisons, with one inmate claiming that military officers forcefully opened his cell during heavy gunfire and ordered him to leave. The attackers were allegedly spotted in police vehicles, carrying stolen equipment. They were also described as wearing uniforms and balaclavas. Analysts put the possible number of attackers at about 50, including military officials and former rebel commanders.

Other clashes were reported near Murray Town, home of the navy, as well as in another military site near Freetown. Two guards assigned at the residence of former president Ernest Bai Koroma were also attacked, with Koroma saying that one of them, a corporal, was killed and the other, a warrant officer was abducted. Local media subsequently reported that the army had carried out a raid at his home, killing one guard and capturing another, while another member of Koroma's security team was killed in a separate clash. Interior minister David Taluva said that the militants had attacked a police barracks and seized weapons from officers after running out of ammunition. A BBC correspondent said he understood that the attackers were supposed to seize the presidential residence but moved on to the armoury after failing to overrun presidential security.

Information Minister Chernoh Bah described the attacks as "co-ordinated and properly planned attacks on the security and wellbeing of our state". The country was subsequently placed under a nationwide curfew, with a manhunt being called to find the militants. President Julius Maada Bio claimed the attack was repelled by the security forces and that the government was in control of the situation. Some militants were captured, with video appearing to show uniformed personnel under arrest in the back or beside a military vehicle. Many streets in Freetown were empty, with soldiers on patrol and checkpoints being set up. Fighting was reported to have been pushed back to the outskirts of the capital. That evening, Bio said in a televised address that most of the leaders of the attack, which he called a "breach of security" and an attack on democracy, had been arrested and that "calm had returned", while the curfew was shortened from 9 PM to 6 AM on 27 November. Sierra Leone's civil aviation authority said the country's airspace remained open but asked airlines to reschedule their flights after the curfew is lifted.

On 28 November, gunfire was reported in Murray Town, with authorities saying that it was part of a successful operation to capture a person of interest in the attacks.

== Casualties ==
The Sierra Leone army said 14 of its soldiers were killed fighting for the government, while eight other personnel were injured. It added that three attackers, one police officer, one prison guard, one civilian woman and a private security employee were also killed, placing the total death toll at 21.

== Perpetrators and motivations ==
The group responsible for the attacks is still unknown.

One of the militants, patrolling on a stolen police vehicle near the Wilberforce barracks, claimed their intent to "clean the society", and asserted not being after ordinary civilians.

Information Minister Chernor Bah said that current and former military officials were among those involved. An army spokesperson described the perpetrators as “renegade soldiers”.

Law enforcement confined former president Ernest Bai Koroma to his home for questioning on 9 December. Sierra Leonean police chief Fayia Sellu said Koroma was a suspect in the coup attempt, and the government confirmed his statement on 12 December. Koroma had previously said that he "strongly condemned the attack".

== Aftermath ==
On 28 November, Information Minister Chernor Bah called the incident "a failed attempted coup" which was intended "to illegally subvert and overthrow a democratically elected government." Police later released photographs of 32 men and two women it said were being sought in connection with the attacks, including include active and retired soldiers and police, as well as some civilians.

On the same day, 13 military officers and one civilian were arrested, while two vehicles carrying weapons and ammunition were recovered after being stolen by the attackers from the armoury. Deputy information minister Yusuf Keketoma Sandi later announced on state radio that 43 people had been arrested over the weekend of 2–3 December, bringing the total number of arrests in relation to the incident to 57. This included 37 soldiers, 10 civilians, four dismissed soldiers, five active police officers and one retired police officer. On 5 December, the government announced the arrest of one of the alleged organizers of the coup, Amadu Koita, a former military officer and bodyguard of former president Koroma and a prominent critic of Bio's government on social media, along with two police officers who sheltered him, bringing the total number of arrests to 60. Police released a surveillance photo of Koita purportedly carrying a gun in one of the prison attacks.

As of 12 December, authorities have arrested 80 people on suspicion of involvement in the coup, while an additional 54 people are being sought, including Koroma's daughter. Authorities also said they had recovered 29 assault rifles and five rocket launchers belonging to the suspected coup plotters. On 2 January 2024, Koita and 11 other individuals were charged with treason before a court in Freetown. The next day, Koroma was also charged with four counts of treason in relation to the coup. On 17 January, Koroma was allowed by the High Court to leave Sierra Leone and seek medical treatment in Nigeria until April.

On 23 July 2024, Koita and ten other defendants were convicted on charges relating to the coup attempt, with Koita receiving a 182-year prison sentence for leading the attempt. The other defendants received sentences ranging from 30 to 112 years. On 9 August, a court-martial convicted 24 soldiers of participating in the coup and sentenced them to prison terms reaching up to 120 years, the last of which was given to the most senior-ranking defendant, Lieutenant Colonel Charles James Mishek Yamba.

== Reactions ==
ECOWAS condemned the attacks, issuing a statement of "zero-tolerance for unconstitutional change of government" on 26 November and calling the incident an attempt to disrupt Sierra Leone's constitutional order. On 28 November, the bloc said it was primed to deploy regional support to "strengthen national security" in the country. The bloc sent a delegation to meet with Bio on 27 November. On the same day, Bio also met with a separate delegation from Nigeria who he said delivered "a message of solidarity" from ECOWAS. Nigerian national security adviser Malam Nuhu Ribadu warned that "anything that will interfere with democracy, peace, security and stability of Sierra Leone will not be accepted by ECOWAS and by Nigeria".

The US embassy also condemned the attacks and offered continuous support to Sierra Leone in a social media statement. France and the European Union's mission expressed concern and called for the respect of constitutional order.
