= Richard Attipoé =

Togolese politician

Richard Attipoé (20 April 1957 – 3 June 2007) was a Togolese politician. He served in the government of Togo as Minister of Youth and Sports from September 2006 to June 2007 and was a member of the ruling Rally of the Togolese People (RPT).

Attipoé was a campaign director for RPT candidate Faure Gnassingbé in the presidential election held on 24 April 2005. When he went to vote on election day, he was beaten up, along with two bodyguards; he said that supporters of the opposition were responsible for this assault.

Attipoé, a member of the RPT's Central Committee, was appointed as Minister of Youth and Sports in the government named on 20 September 2006. He died in a Paramount Airlines helicopter crash on 3 June 2007 at the Lungi International Airport near Freetown, Sierra Leone along with 21 other people. Attipoé was part of a Togolese delegation attending an African Nations Cup football qualifying match played in Freetown between Sierra Leone and Togo; after the match, they were flown to the airport, where the helicopter caught on fire and crashed as it attempted to land. Attipoé was buried in Lomé on 23 June.
