= Kelvin Doe =

African engineer

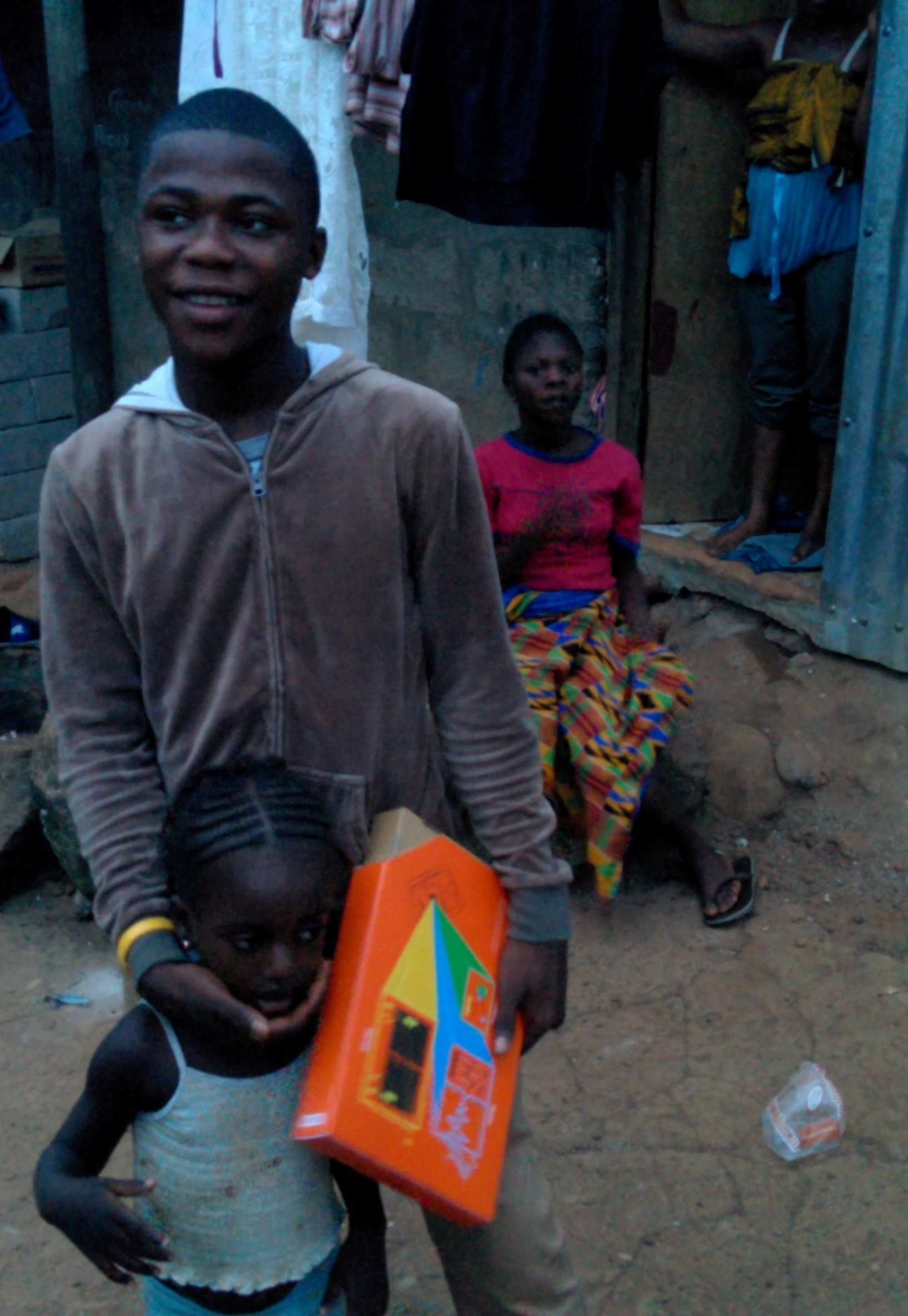
Doe with his Kano computer kit in Sierra Leone in 2013

Kelvin Doe (born October 26, 1996, in Freetown, Sierra Leone), also known as DJ Focus, is a Sierra Leonean engineer.

== Career ==
He is known for teaching himself engineering at the age of 12 and building his own radio station in Sierra Leone, where he plays music and broadcasts news under the name "DJ Focus." He was one of the finalists in GMin's Innovate Salone idea competition, in which Doe built a generator from scrap metals. Doe would constantly use discarded pieces of scrap electronics to build transmitters, generators, and batteries.

As a result of his accomplishment, he received an invitation to the United States, and subsequently became the youngest person to participate in the Visiting Practitioner's Program at MIT.

Doe was a speaker at TEDxTeen and d to undergraduate engineering students at Harvard College. In May 2013, Doe signed a $100,000 solar project pact with Canadian High-Speed Service Provider Sierra WiFi.

He has had the chance to meet various leaders of the world including former US Secretary of State Hillary Clinton, and Ghanaian President Nana Akufo-Addo. He has also been able to speak to young people in Africa on different platforms. In 2016, Doe became an honorary board member of Emergency USA, an organization with a mission to provide free medical and surgical care to war victims and poverty victims.

Doe now owns and runs his own company K-Doe Tech, Inc, where he designs and sells consumer electronics.accomplishments were documented by RadicalMedia and presented on their corporate YouTube channel. When the video went viral, the story was picked up by CNN, NBC News, and The Huffington Post. Today, Doe is claimed to be a young African inventor.
