= 2017 in Sierra Leone =

- Decades: 1990s; 2000s; 2010s; 2020s
- See also: Other events of 2017; Timeline of Sierra Leonean history

This is a list of events in the year 2017 in Sierra Leone.

== Incumbents ==
- President: Ernest Bai Koroma

== Events ==
- 14 August – The 2017 Sierra Leone mudslides in and around Freetown resulted in hundreds of fatalities.
- 16 August - A mass burial of victims of the mudslides took place in Freetown. Over 600 people are still reportedly missing.

== Deaths ==
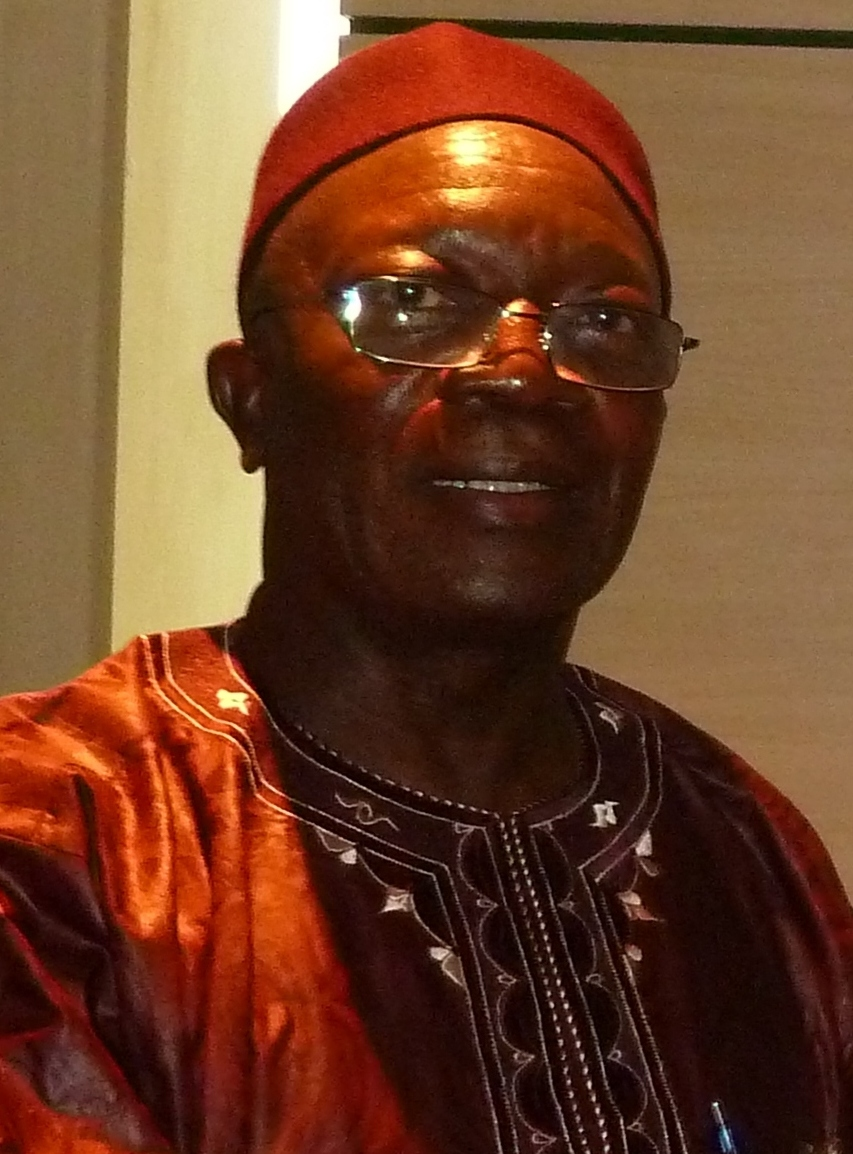
J. B. Dauda] in 2011

- 1 June – J. B. Dauda, politician (b. 1942).
