= Prince Harding =

Sierra Leonean politician

Dr. Prince Alex Harding (born in Bo, Sierra Leone). Harding is a Mende who was the Minister of Safety and Security from February 2001 to May 2002, when he became the Minister of Transport and Communications. He was also the secretary general of the Sierra Leone People's Party. Harding was suspended from his post on 5 June 2007.

== Excellence Award ==
On 5 May 2007, Harding was given an "award of excellence" by the "Bookish Klan of the Milton Margai College of Education and Technology, Goderich Campus, for his "immense contribution to National Development" particularly in his capacity as Minister of Transport and Communication during which tenure Sierra Leone has witnessed "an impact growth" in telecommunications".

== Sources ==
- Minister suspended over air crash BBC News, 5 June 2007
- Dr. Harding Gets Excellence Award in Sierra Leone Awareness Times, 8 May 2007
