= 2014 in Sierra Leone =

- Decades: 1990s; 2000s; 2010s; 2020s
- See also: Other events of 2014; Timeline of Sierra Leonean history

The following lists events that happened during 2014 in Sierra Leone.

== Incumbents ==
- President: Ernest Bai Koroma
- Vice President: Samuel Sam-Sumana

== Events ==
=== March ===
- March 24 - An outbreak of Ebola virus which has killed at least 59 people in Guinea continues its spread, entering Liberia and threatens to spread to Sierra Leone.
- March 31 - The Ebola outbreak is reported to have made several cases in Sierra Leone.

=== May ===
- May 26 - WHO reports the first cases and deaths of Ebola in Sierra Leone, in Kailahun District.
- May 29 - Medical teams from the World Health Organization and Doctors Without Borders arrive in Sierra Leone to deal with an outbreak of Ebola virus.

=== June ===
- June 6 - The World Health Organization estimates that an outbreak of the Ebola virus has killed more than 200 people in West Africa.
- June 11 - Sierra Leone closed its borders with Liberia and Guinea and closed a number of schools around the country. On 30 July, the government began to deploy troops to enforce quarantines.
- June 20 - The WHO announces up to 158 Ebola cases in Sierra Leone. In addition to Kailahun District, cases were also reported in Kenema, Kambia, Port Loko, and Western Area Rural districts.

=== July ===
- July 14 - Ebola virus epidemic in West Africa
  - The Bo District reports its first Ebola case.
  - The Ebola virus outbreak in West Africa continues to get worse with the death toll now exceeding 500.
- July 17 - The number of EVD cases in Sierra Leone surpasses those of Liberia and Guinea at 442.
- July 18 - WHO regards the disease trend in Sierra Leone and Liberia as "serious" with 67 new cases and 19 deaths reported to date.
- July 25 - The first case of Ebola in Freetown is recorded. She was taken by her relatives from a hospital.
- July 29 - Ebola virus epidemic in West Africa
  - ASKY Airlines suspends flights to Liberia and Sierra Leone as the death toll from the Ebola outbreak reaches 672.
  - Sheik Umar Khan, the doctor who was leading the fight against the disease in Sierra Leone, dies of the Ebola virus.
- July 30 - The Sierra Leone government allowed the deployment of troops to maintain Ebola quarantines.
- July 31 - Ebola virus epidemic in West Africa
  - The World Health Organization announces a US$100 million emergency response plan to combat the outbreak, which has killed at least 729 people.
  - The Peace Corps withdraws all volunteers from Liberia, Sierra Leone and Guinea, citing Ebola risks.

=== August ===
- August 1 - Liberia and Sierra Leone declare a state of emergency in response to the Ebola virus disease by sending in troops and ordering the closure of schools and markets and the quarantining of affected communities.
- August 4 - The World Health Organization estimates that the death toll from the Ebola virus outbreak has risen to 887.
- August 6 - The World Health Organization reports that 932 have died from the latest outbreak of the Ebola virus with a man reportedly dying of the disease in Jeddah, Saudi Arabia after a business trip to Sierra Leone.

=== October ===
- October 14 - 800 Sierra Leone peacekeepers due to relieve a contingent deployed in Somalia were placed under quarantine when one of the soldiers tested positive for Ebola.
- October 16 - The Emergency Operations Center announced two Ebola cases in the Koinadugu district in the far north. This marks the arrival of cases in every district in the country.
- October 21 - Riots broke out in the Kono district to prevent the quarantine of a 90-year-old woman suspected of having EVD; the youths are reportedly angry that there are no treatment centers in the diamond-rich Kono district. A daytime curfew is imposed.

== Deaths ==
=== January ===
- January 26 - Tom Nyuma

=== March ===
- March 13 - Ahmad Tejan Kabbah
- March 16 - Yulisa Pat Amadu Maddy

=== July ===
- July 29 - Sheik Umar Khan
