= Minkailu Mansaray =

Sierra Leonean politician (1951–2026)

Alhaji Minkailu Mansaray

Minister of Mines and Mineral Resources
- Incumbent
- Assumed office 2010
- President: Ernest Bai Koroma
- Preceded by: Alpha Kanu

Sierra Leone minister of Labor
- In office 2007–2010
- Preceded by: Alpha Timbo

Member of Parliament
- In office 2002–2007

Personal details
- Born: 1951 Tonkolili District, Sierra Leone
- Died: 15 June 2026 (aged 75) Dakar, Senegal
- Education: Fourah Bay College
- Profession: Insurance executive, businessman

Alhaji Minkailu Mansaray (1951 – 15 June 2026) was a Sierra Leonean politician and businessman, who was the country's minister of mines and mineral resources. He was also the deputy leader of the All People's Congress (APC) party.

An experienced career businessman in the insurance industry, Minkailu Mansaray worked many years as an executive at the Sierra Leone National Insurance Company.

Mansaray was an elected member of Parliament from then opposition APC party, and served as a member of Parliament from 2002 to 2007, when the APC became the ruling party. He was Sierra Leone's Minister of Labour from 2007 to 2010; and had been Sierra Leone's Minister of Mines and Natural Resources since 2010. In 2012, Mansaray was elected deputy leader of the All People's Congress (APC) party.

He was a senior and long-term member of the All People's Congress party (APC), and was a member of the APC National Advisory Council, a powerful body within the APC, that is made up of the most senior members of the APC party. Mansaray was a close ally of Sierra Leone's former president Ernest Bai Koroma.

Mansaray was a close ally and personal friend of Sierra Leone's former president Ernest Bai Koroma, with whom he worked with at the Sierra Leone National Insurance Company.

== Early life and career ==
Minkailu Mansaray was born in Tonkolili District in the Northern province of Sierra Leone. He was of Temne heritage. Mansaray was born to Muslim parents, and he himself was a devout Muslim. Mansaray went to the Islamic pilgrimage, Hajj, one of the Five Pillars of Islam. He grew up in the capital, Freetown.

He was a graduate of Fourah Bay College. Mansaray spent many years working as an insurance executive at the Sierra Leone National Insurance Company. He worked alongside eventual Sierra Leone's president Ernest Bai Koroma at the Sierra Leone National Insurance Company.

== Political career ==
Mansaray was a long-term member of the All People's Congress (APC) party. He was a member of the APC youth league, during his youth days in the East End of Freetown. in 2002, Mansaray was elected member of Parliament for the APC, and remained a member of parliament until 2007, when the APC became the ruling party, after winning the 2007 Sierra Leone Presidential election, and the APC also won majority of seats in Parliament in the 2007 Parliamentary election.

From 2002 to 2010, Mansaray was appointed minister of Labour and employment, in the first cabinet of Ernest Bai Koroma. He had been Sierra Leone's minister of Mines and Mineral Resources since 2010.

He was a senior member of the APC party; and was a member of the National Advisory Council, a powerful council within the APC party, that is made up of the most senior members of the APC party. He was also a close ally and personal friend of Ernest Bai Koroma.

== Death ==
Mansaray died in Dakar, Senegal on 15 June 2026, at the age of 75.
