= 2007 Freetown explosions =

2007 Freetown explosion

2007 Freetown explosion
- Date: December 20, 2007 (GMT)
- Attack type: Gas explosion
- Deaths: 18
- Injuries: ≈ 5

On 20 December 2007, a series of explosions occurred in the shopping district of Free Street in downtown Freetown, Sierra Leone, killing 18 people while injuring at least five more.

== Explosions ==
The explosions were preceded by a fire that started in a used clothing store in downtown Freetown and spread to the rest of the four-storey primarily residential building. According to the deputy chief of the local fire brigade, there had likely been a gas leak which was ignited by the fire.

== Casualties and initial response ==
The explosions killed at least 17 people and injured an estimated five others, while destroying much of the building it had occurred in and trapping "many people" underneath the rubble. An onsite fire engine was also damaged. The Connaught Hospital was reported to have struggled to care for the wounded.
