= 2022 Sierra Leone doctors' strike =

2022 Sierra Leone doctors strike
- Date: August 1, 2022
- Location: Sierra Leone
- Caused by: The COVID-19 pandemic and the cost of living crisis
- Goals: Increased pay for doctors, back pay, and a 45 liter fuel allowance
- Methods: Strike action
- Result: Strike ended with 80% of striking workers' demands having been met

Parties
Sierra Leone Medical and Dental Association	Sierra Leone Ministries of Health and Finance

The 2022 Sierra Leone doctors strike was a strike action by public sector medical doctors in Sierra Leone represented by the Medical and Dental Association (SLMDA) against low pay and lack of benefits. It began on August 1, 2022 and ended on August 6 when the government granted a pay rise and the issuance of weekly fuel allowances through a prepaid card.

== Background ==
In 2018 and 2020, doctors in Sierra Leone went on strike for similar reasons.

At the beginning of the COVID-19 pandemic, the government of Sierra Leone offered doctors a monthly risk allowance and tax break in compensation for the increased pressure and workplace hazards related to the pandemic. In May 2022, these benefits were terminated. Doctors noted that due to this termination, their take-home pay had been reduced by 20 to 40%. The Ministries of Finance and Health stated that the changes in compensation were decided as a part of the government redefining its response to COVID-19.

In July, doctors issued a 21-day strike notice. Dr. Edries Tejan, president of the SLMDA, noted that they had been in talks with the Sierra Leone Ministries of Health and Finance since February and that the decision to call a strike was the result of a breakdown in negotiations. The strike officially began on the 1st of August, 2022 and would remain ongoing until an agreement was made. There demands included:

- Backlog payment issued to cover the decrease in take-home pay from May to August
- Better pay, in line with the cost of living crisis
- A 45 liter fuel allowance paid in cash to doctors

At the beginning of the strike, the government argued that it had already met the demands of the striking workers. However, Dr. Edries Tejan, president of the SLMDA, noted that doctors didn't trust the particular fuel voucher program proposed by the government, and that the matter of backlog in pay since May had still not been addressed.

== Outcome ==
Five days after the strike began, SLMDA leadership confirmed the strike was coming to an end.

The SLMDA explained that the decision to end the strike was made with the Ministry of Health having met 80% of the striking workers demands. The SLMDA dropped their demand that the Ministry of Health offer back pay to doctors for the months of May through August based on the cuts made in May. Doctors would, however, see the cuts reversed in September as a pay rise.

The SLMDA's demand for fuel compensation to be issued as cash was ultimately dropped as well, as issuing cash for fuel would have violated existing government policies. Instead, doctors would receive prepaid cards to pay for fuel. The SLMDA stated this compromise was made out of concern that negotiations with the Ministry were approaching a stalemate.

The decision to resume work was unanimous among the general membership, under the presumption that the September pay rise pledged by the Ministry would be honored. SLMDA leadership stated that were that not the case, the strike would resume.
