= Desmond Luke =

Sierra Leonean politician and lawyer (1935–2021)

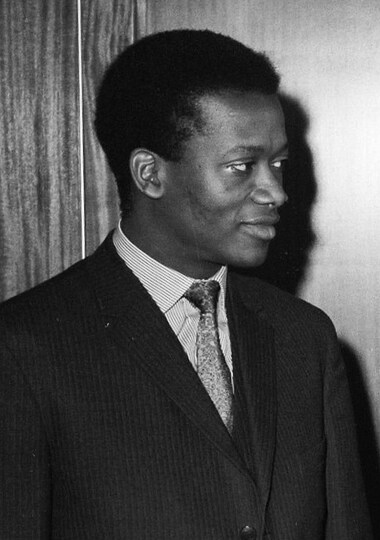
- Luke in 1971
- Born: Desmond Edgar Fashole Luke; 6 October 1935
- Died: 27 February 2021 (aged 85)
- Education: King's College, Taunton; Keble College, Oxford; Magdalene College, Cambridge
- Occupations: Politician and lawyer

Desmond Edgar Fashole Luke (6 October 1935 – 27 February 2021) was a former politician and lawyer in Sierra Leone. He served as foreign minister (1973–75), Minister of Health (1977–78), and ambassador to the West Germany (1969–73), France (1971–73) and the European Economic Community (1971–73) at various points in his political career. Luke competed in the 1996 presidential election against several other candidates, eventually losing to current President Ahmed Tejan Kabbah after only receiving 1.1% of the vote in the initial round of voting. In March 1998, Luke was appointed to replace Samuel Beccles-Davies as Chief Justice of the Supreme Court. Luke retired from that position in 2002. He was an alumnus of Cambridge University and Oxford University. Luke was a strong supporter of Kabbah's government-in-exile after the 1997 coup by Johnny Paul Koroma.

== Early life and education ==
A member of the Creole ethnic group, Desmond Edgar Fashole Luke was born in 1935 in Freetown, British Sierra Leone, into a high-achieving family. His father, Sir Emile Fashole Luke was until 1973 Speaker of the House of Representatives in Sierra Leone. Desmond Luke attended the Prince of Wales Secondary School in Freetown for two years, before going to England in 1949 to continue his education at King's College, Taunton, Somerset. From 1954 to 1958, he studied at Keble College, Oxford, earning a degree in Philosophy, Politics and Economics in 1957, but staying for a further year to study West African medieval history under the historian Thomas Hodgkin. Luke continued his studies at Magdalene College, Cambridge (1959–61), earning an MA in Law.

== Political career ==
Returning to Sierra Leone in 1962, he set up law chambers in Freetown and was in private practice until 1969, when Siaka Stevens appointed him Ambassador to West Germany (accredited to all EU countries). In 1973, Luke was appointed Foreign Minister, which post he held for two years. He subsequently held the post of Minister of Health for a year (1977–78), after which he left the government though remained in Parliament until 1983. He later set up the National Unity Movement (NUM), to advocate constitutional reforms, and under the NUM banner contested, and lost, the 1996 elections. He was appointed Chief Justice in 1998, from which position he retired in 2002.
