= Henrietta Mbawah =

Sierra Leonean actress (died 2023)

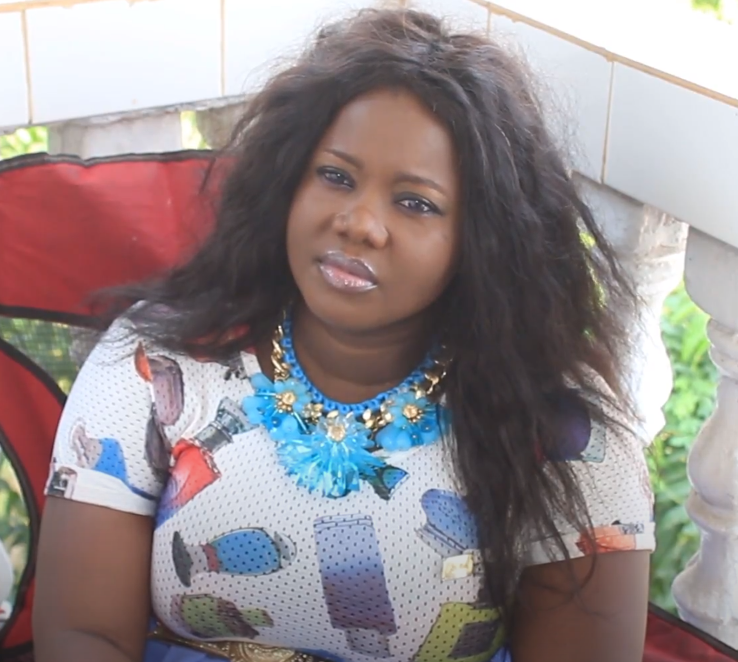
- Mbawah in 2018
- Born: c. 1988; Sierra Leone
- Died: 17 February 2023 (aged 34)
- Other name: Etta 1
- Occupations: Actress, TV Host, director, social activist
- Years active: 2000–2023

Henrietta Mbawah (c. 1988 – 17 February 2023) was a Sierra Leonean actress, filmmaker and social activist. She was best known as the director of critically acclaimed short film Jattu and for her role as a journalist in the short film Ebola Checkpoint.

== Life and career ==
Initially, Mbawah started to act in television serials with minor and uncredited roles. In 2016, she directed the short film Jattu about a girl (Jattu,) who survived an Ebola outbreak in Africa. That same year, she appeared in front of the camera in the short film Ebola Checkpoint in the role of a journalist. She was also the chief executive officer of the Manor River Entertainment Company. In 2019, she won the Sister's Choice Award for her involvement for the women empowerment in Sierra Leone.

Mbawah died on 17 February 2023, at the age of 34.

== Partial filmography ==
Year	Film	Role	Genre	Ref.
2016	Ebola Checkpoint	Actress (Journalist)	Short film	
2016	Jattu	Director	Short film	
