= Paramount Airlines =

Helicopter airline from Sierra Leone

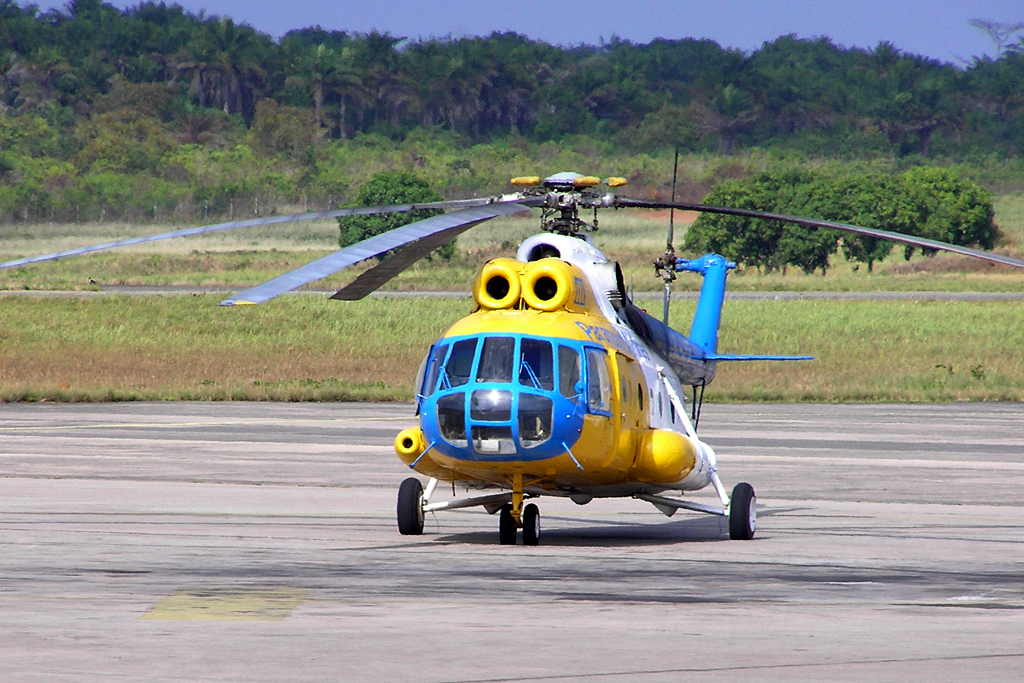
- Paramount Airlines Mil Mi-8 at Freetown International Airport
IATA	ICAO	Call sign
-	PRR	Paramount
- Ceased operations: 2007
- Fleet size: Mil Mi-8
- Destinations: Freetown, Sierra Leone, Freetown International Airport, Abuja, Nigeria
- Headquarters: Sierra Leone

Paramount Airlines was a helicopter airline in Sierra Leone that used to provide a helicopter service between the capital, Freetown, and Freetown International Airport as well as other cities within the country.

The airport is in Lungi which lies across the Sierra Leone River from Freetown. Air or sea transport are the only practical ways to travel between the airport and the capital, unless one travels via a three-hour road-trip. The paramount flights operated from the apron of the airport to the Aberdeen area of Freetown.

Paramount Airlines also flew helicopters to other places within West Africa including Abuja, Nigeria. Flights were grounded by the Sierra Leone government for safety reasons in 2007 after a flight from the capital Freetown crashed on landing at the Lungi International Airport, killing 22 of the 23 people on board.

The airline was on the List of air carriers banned in the European Union.

== Accidents ==
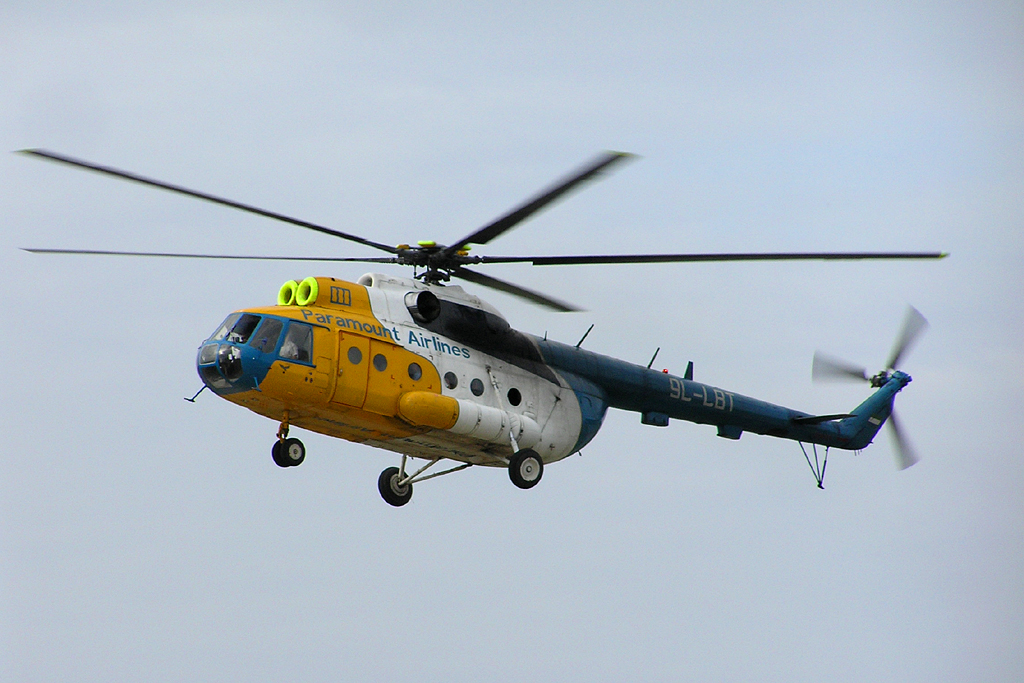
Paramount Airlines Mil Mi-8 at Freetown Lungi Airport, arriving from Mammy Yoko Heliport in Freetown

On June 3, 2007, a helicopter flight from Freetown crashed on landing at Lungi airport, killing all 22 people on board. 19 of the victims were supporters of the Togo national football team, including Togo's Minister of Sport, Richard Attipoé; the fans had been in Sierra Leone to attend a qualifier for the African Cup of Nations, which Togo had won 1-0. The two pilots were of Ukrainian origin. The passengers had chartered the aircraft specifically for the flight.

According to an eyewitness, both pilots jumped out immediately prior to the crash. Later reports stated that 22 were killed, and that the Russian copilot was the only survivor. The aircraft caught fire upon impact and was destroyed before firefighters were able to extinguish the flames.

The government of Togo sent a six-person delegation to help with the investigation into the crash. The majority of the dead were identified as Togolese football fans who had come to cheer their team's 1–0 victory over Sierra Leone at an African Cup of Nations qualifying match on Sunday. They included Togolese politician Richard Attipoe who was serving as Togo's minister of sports.
