= Abubakarr Jalloh =

Sierra Leonean politician

Alhaji Abubakarr Jalloh is a Sierra Leonean politician. Since the election of Ernest Bai Koroma as President of Sierra Leone in September 2007, Jalloh has served as Minister of Mineral Resources. In 2002 Presidential election, Jalloh was the running mate of Koroma in the All People's Congress Party. He is a member of the Fula ethnic group.

== Education ==
Jalloh attended the Methodist Boys’ High School in Freetown and then completed his A levels at Prince of Wales School. Jalloh then attended Fourah Bay College where he majored in math and physics. At Fourah Bay, Jalloh became involved in Maoist student protests. Jalloh later earned master's degrees in geophysics, atmospheric physics and hydrogeology from Imperial College London and University College London respectively.
