= Chernor Bah =

Sierra Leonean politician

Minister of Information and Civic Education
- Incumbent
- Assumed office 2023
- President: Julius Maada Bio
- Preceded by: Mohamed Rahman Swaray

Personal details
- Born: Chernor Bah; 7 July 1985 (age 41) Sierra Leone
- Party: Sierra Leone People's Party
- Education: Albert Academy; Fourah Bay College
- Website: www.ceebah.org

Chernor Bah is a Sierra Leonean politician, currently the Minister Of Information and Civic Education for the Republic of Sierra Leone.

Bah is an advocate for girl's and women's education. He is the co-founder of A World At School and Purposeful.

== Education ==
Chernor Bah holds a Bachelor's degree from Fourah Bay College, University of Sierra Leone, and a Master's Degree from the University of Notre Dame in the United States.

== Career ==
=== United Nations ===
From 2007 to 2008, Chernor Bah served as a Special Youth Fellow at the United Nations, where he worked to include the voices of war-affected youth in the Graça Machel Review Study on the Impact of Armed Conflict on Children. He travelled to various war-affected regions and co-authored a youth report presented to the UN Security Council titled "Will You Listen? Young Voices from Conflict Zones".

In 2008 and 2009, Bah led the United Nations Population Fund's first post-war youth program in Liberia. He contributed to the development of Liberia's new youth policy and action plan and supported efforts to rebuild an inclusive youth infrastructure in the country.

In 2012, Bah was appointed by the United Nations Secretary-General as the Youth Representative on the High-Level Steering Committee for the Secretary-General's Global Education First Initiative. He also chaired the initiative's Youth Advocacy Group, where he worked in the "IamMalala" campaign. During this time, he co-founded "A World at School," a digital mobilization and campaign organization for global education. He initiated and led the Global Youth Ambassador initiative, in which over 500 young leaders campaigned for education in Sierra Leone and abroad.

=== Ministerial role ===
Bah was appointed Minister Of Information and Civic Education for the Republic of Sierra Leone in August 2023.
