= David Moinina Sengeh =

Sierra Leonean politician

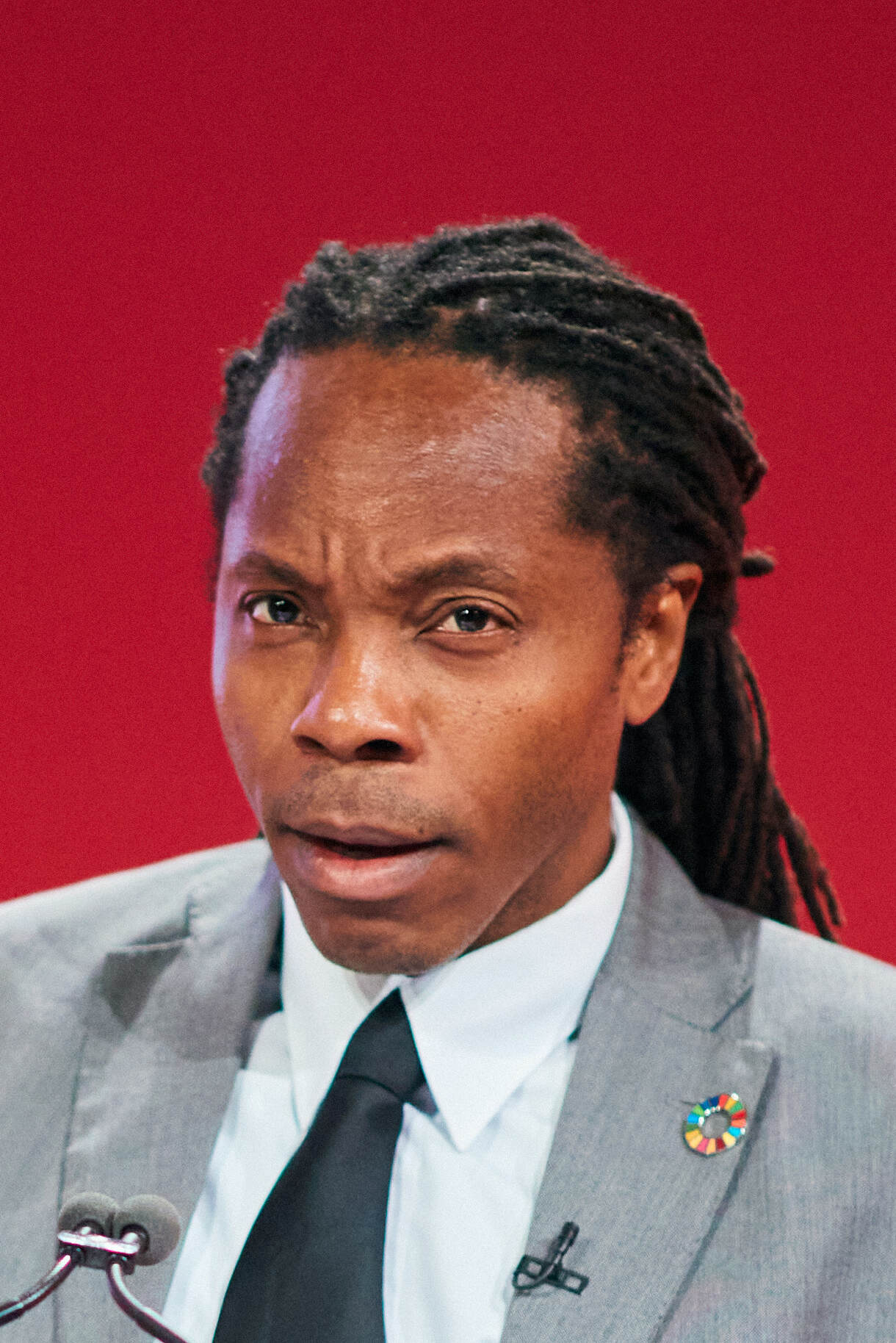
- Sengeh in 2022

Chief Minister of Sierra Leone
- Incumbent
- Assumed office 10 July 2023
- President: Julius Maada Bio
- Preceded by: Jacob Jusu Saffa

Personal details
- Education: UWC Red Cross Nordic; Harvard University; Massachusetts Institute of Technology
- Scientific career
- Workplaces: IBM Research
- Thesis: The use of a novel residuum model to design a variable-impedance transtibial prosthetic socket (2016)
- Doctoral advisor: Hugh Herr

David Moinina Sengeh is a Sierra Leonean politician who has served as the chief minister of Sierra Leone after being appointed by President Julius Maada Bio in 2023. He previously served as the minister of basic and senior secondary education and chief innovation officer for the Directorate of Science, Technology and Innovation. He is a TED Senior Fellow.

== Education and early life ==
Sengeh was offered a scholarship to study in Norway, and joined the UWC Red Cross Nordic College in 2004. His uncle was a surgeon. He studied biomedical engineering at Harvard University. He researched aerosolised vaccines for tuberculosis and graduated with a bachelor's degree in 2010. During his time at Harvard University, he was cofounder of Lebone Solutions, a start-up that developed inexpensive batteries from microbial fuel cells. He was listed in the 2013 Wired magazine Smart List. Sengeh joined Massachusetts Institute of Technology for his postgraduate studies, working under the supervision of Hugh Herr. He was inspired to work on prosthetics because he grew up surrounded by victims of civil war. He used MRI to map amputee's limbs, then assessed where artificial materials could create pressure points, and used 3D printing to generate new sockets. His prototypes were tested by veterans and amputees from the Boston Marathon bombing. He was named as a TED fellow in 2014, delivering a talk entitled The sore problem of prosthetic limbs. He was selected as one of Forbes 30 Under 30 in 2014. He won the 2014 Lemelson–MIT Prize for his innovations in healthcare. He was selected as one of Face2Face Africa's Young Africans Committed to Excellence. He completed his PhD at Massachusetts Institute of Technology in 2016. After completing his PhD, Sengeh toured makerspaces in America talking about his work on prosthetics.

During his PhD research, Sengeh founded the NGO Global Minimum Inc, a program that supports the Innovate Salone entrepreneurship program in Sierra Leone, Kenya and Cape Town. He wanted to change 'aid to Africa' to 'Made in Africa'. The "A De Mek Am" Innovate Salone program supports teams from secondary schools to develop solutions to local problems. It was created in collaboration with the MIT Media Lab and MIT Public Service Center and modelled on the MIT innovation competitions. Sengeh supported the winning student projects to travel to the United States, where they spoke at Maker Faire. He supported Kelvin Doe, a thirteen year old inventor who had never left a ten-mile radius of his house in Sierra Leone, to join the MIT Visiting Practitioner's Program. Sengeh became Kelvin Doe's mentor. He returned to the TED stage in 2015, speaking to Kate Krontiris about innovation and inspiration. He has spoken at the NextEinstein Forum.

== Career ==
Sengeh was offered a position at IBM in Africa, working on data-driven healthcare. He worked with IBM Research in Nairobi, as well as in their newest lab in Johannesburg, designing and developing healthcare technologies in Africa. There are fewer than 50 doctors for every hundred thousand citizens in Africa, so Sengeh is exploring the use of artificial intelligence. He worked with Waheeda Banu Saib from the University of KwaZulu-Natal. He partnered with Port Loko Health Management Team to design a web-based tool that allows districts to monitor Ebola. He writes for HuffPost.

In May 2018. Sengeh joined the Office of the President of Sierra Leone, working as chief innovation officer. In 2019 he was named Minister of Education of Sierra Leone. He ensured that each child in the Pujehun District had access to a laptop. He spoke at the Bill & Melinda Gates Foundation and was described as a trailblazer. He is a prolific musician.

On 10 July 2023, Sengeh was appointed as the Chief Minister of Sierra Leone by President Julius Maada Bio.

== Other activities ==
- Global Education Monitoring (GEM) Report, chair of the Advisory Board
