= Raymond Desmond Aderemi Renner-Thomas =

Aderemi Raymond Desmond Renner-Thomas (born 7 September 1945 – 17 November, 2022) was a former Chief Justice of Sierra Leone.

An ethnic Creole, Thomas was born and raised in Freetown, Sierra Leone's capital. He was a lecturer at The Fourah Bay University Sierra Leone, a Diplomat serving in France and Nigeria. He later obtained a PhD in land law. In 2005, he was appointed to the position of chief justice by former president, Ahmad Tejan Kabbah. In 2008 Renner-Thomas retired as chief justice. The president Ernest Bai Koroma appointed Umu Hawa Tejan Jalloh as his successor. He worked as a consultant lawyer at Renner Thomas Associates. He died on the 17 November 2022.

Ade was married to Jennifer Renner-Thomas (née Bankole-Jones) for over 40 years. In 1988 they had twin girls Janine Renner-Thomas and Jacqueline Renner-Thomas, who currently live and work in London. Jennifer lived with Ade in Freetown until his death in 2022. She is the director of the MEPS Trust Well Woman Clinic.

== Works ==
- Renner-Thomas, Ade. (2010). Land Tenure in Sierra Leone: The Law, Dualism and the Making of a Land Policy. Authorhouse. ISBN 978-1-4490-5866-1.
