= Mohamed Juldeh Jalloh =

Vice President of Sierra Leone since 2018

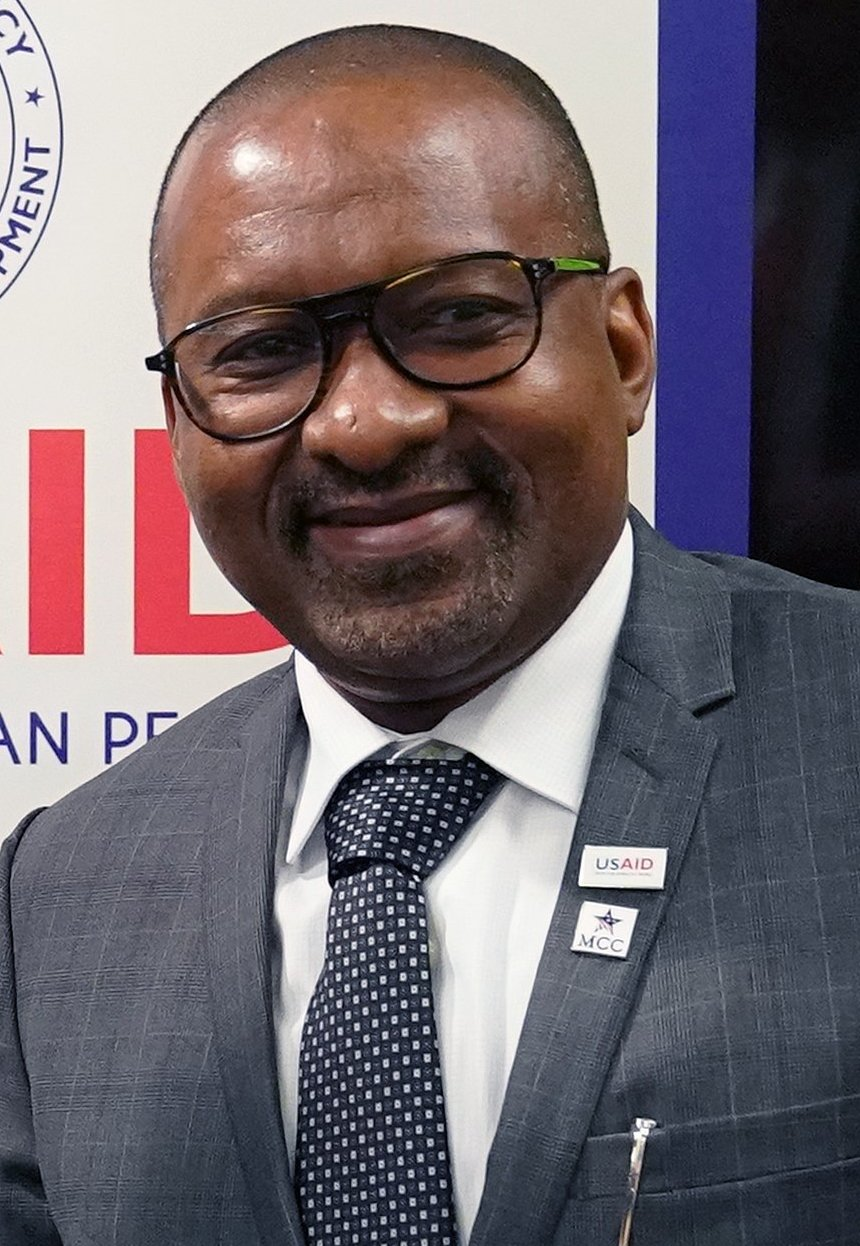

Vice President of Sierra Leone
- Incumbent
- Assumed office 4 April 2018
- President: Julius Maada Bio
- Preceded by: Victor Bockarie Foh

Personal details
- Born: Mohamed Juldeh Jalloh; 1970 (age 55–56) Koidu Town, Sierra Leone
- Party: Sierra Leone People's Party
- Spouse: Fatou Banel Jalloh
- Education: Fourah Bay College; University of Ibadan; University of Bordeaux
- Occupation: Politician; businessman
- Religion: Islam

Mohamed Juldeh Jalloh (born 1970) is a Sierra Leonean politician and the current vice president of Sierra Leone since 4 April 2018. Jalloh is a political scientist, businessman and a former United Nations official. Jalloh is a senior member of the Sierra Leone People's Party.

Jalloh earned a bachelor's degree in political science from Fourah Bay College, a Master's degree in political science from the University of Ibadan in Ibadan, Nigeria; and doctorate degree from the University of Bordeaux in Bordeaux, France. Jalloh is fluent in several languages including English and French.

A political scientist by profession, Jalloh started working for the United Nations in 2000, when he was a program officer at the United Nations mission in Kosovo. He has also served as a member of the board of senior advisers at the United Nations stabilization mission in Mali and the Sahel region.

He was nominated the presidential running mate of Julius Maada Bio in the Sierra Leonean presidential election of 2018, which they won in a run-off.

Jalloh is a devout Muslim, and was born and raised in Koidu, Kono District in eastern Sierra Leone. He is a member of the Fula ethnic group.
