= Julius Maada Bio =

President of Sierra Leone since 2018

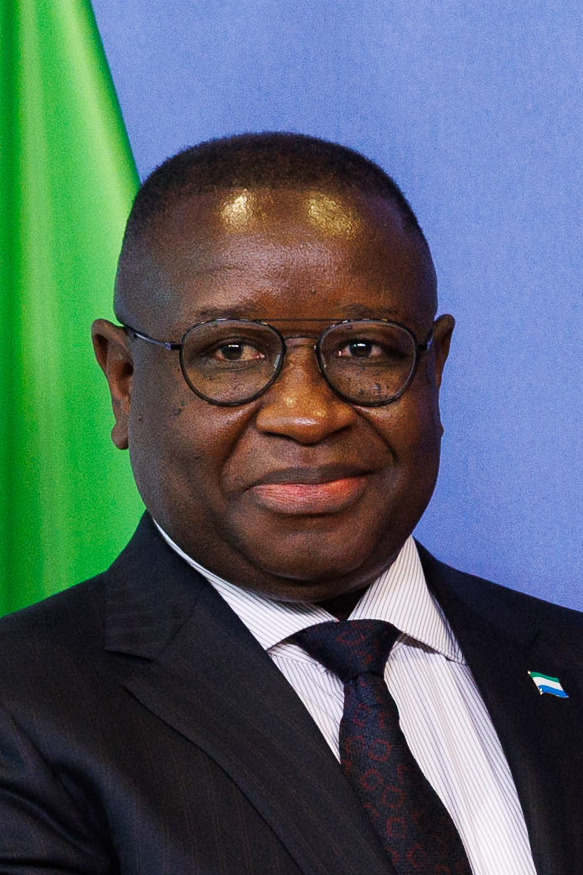
- Bio in 2023

5th President of Sierra Leone
- Incumbent
- Assumed office 4 April 2018
- Vice President: Mohamed Juldeh Jalloh
- Chief Minister: David J. Francis; Jacob Jusu Saffa; David Sengeh
- Preceded by: Ernest Bai Koroma

Chairman of the National Provisional Ruling Council
- In office 16 January 1996 – 29 March 1996
- Deputy: Komba Mondeh
- Preceded by: Valentine Strasser
- Succeeded by: Ahmad Tejan Kabbah (Note: as elected president)

Deputy Chairman of the National Provisional Ruling Council
- In office June 1993 – March 1995
- Chairman: Valentine Strasser
- Preceded by: Solomon Musa
- Succeeded by: Komba Mondeh

Chief of the Defence Staff
- In office March 1995 – January 1996
- Head of State: Valentine Strasser
- Preceded by: Kellie Conteh
- Succeeded by: Joy Turay

Chairman of ECOWAS
- Incumbent
- Assumed office 22 June 2025
- Preceded by: Bola Ahmed Tinubu

Personal details
- Born: Julius Maada Wonie Bio; 12 May 1964 (age 62) Tihun, Bonthe District, Sierra Leone
- Party: Sierra Leone People's Party
- Spouse: Fatima Bio (m. 2013)
- Children: 5
- Education: Benguema Military Academy; American University; University of Bradford
- Website: Government website

Military service
- Allegiance: Sierra Leone
- Branch/service: Sierra Leone Army
- Years of service: 1985–1996
- Rank: Brigadier
- Commands: Republic of Sierra Leone Armed Forces
- Battles/wars: First Liberian Civil War; Sierra Leone Civil War

Julius Maada Wonie Bio (born 12 May 1964) is a Sierra Leonean politician and former military officer who has served as the 5th president of Sierra Leone since 4 April 2018. He is a retired brigadier in the Sierra Leone Army and was the military head of state of Sierra Leone from 16 January 1996 to 29 March 1996, at only 32 years old in a military junta government known as the National Provisional Ruling Council (NPRC).

As military head of state, Bio returned Sierra Leone to a democratically elected government, when he handed power to Ahmad Tejan Kabbah of the Sierra Leone People's Party, following Kabbah's victory in the 1996 Sierra Leonean presidential election. Upon retiring from the military in 1996, Bio moved to the United States, where he was granted political asylum, and he did not visit Sierra Leone from the U.S. until 2005.

Bio ran as the Sierra Leone People's Party (SLPP) presidential candidate in the 2012 presidential election, but lost to incumbent President Ernest Bai Koroma. He ran again in 2018, defeating Samura Kamara of the ruling All People's Congress (APC).

As president, Bio has overturned most of the policies of Koroma, whom he accuses of corruption and mismanagement of the country's treasury. A deadly coup attempt to overthrow Bio failed in September 2023. Former president Koroma was detained and charged with treason as he was accused of being involved in the failed coup attempt.

Bio's government's handling of the economy was the target of a violent protest in August 2022. Bio was nevertheless re-elected the following year, though the elections were marred by violence and raised concern from international observers due to a lack of transparency in the counting process. As president, Bio has implemented free primary and secondary school public education and repealed the death penalty.

== Early life ==
Julius Maada Wonie Bio was born on 12 May 1964, in Tihun, a village in the Sogbini Chiefdom, Bonthe District in the Southern Province of Sierra Leone. Bio was born three years after Sierra Leone's Independence during the administration of then Sierra Leone Prime Minister Sir Albert Margai of the SLPP. Bio is the 33rd of 35 children born to Sherbro Paramount Chief Charlie Bio II of Sogbini Chiefdom. Bio's father had nine wives. Bio is named after his paternal grandfather Julius Maada Wonie Bio, who was also a Sherbro paramount chief of Sogbini Chiefdom. Bio is an ethnic Sherbro, and a practicing Roman Catholic.

Bio began his primary education at the Roman Catholic Primary School in Tihun, Bonthe District. After finishing his early years in primary school, Bio was sent to the town of Pujehun to live with his older sister Agnes, who was a primary school teacher in Pujehun. Bio completed his primary education at the Holy Family Primary School in Pujehun. After his primary education, Agnes enrolled him at the Bo Government Secondary School in Bo (commonly known as Bo School), a prominent boarding school. Bio spent seven years at Bo School, rising to become school prefect. Bio graduated from Bo School in 1984 with A-level at age 20.

== Military career ==
After graduating from secondary school, Bio applied for admission into Fourah Bay College in Freetown in 1985 at age 21. However, Bio ultimately enrolled in the Republic of Sierra Leone Armed Forces military academy at Benguema, just outside the capital city of Freetown. He trained as a cadet officer under the command of Major Fallah Sewa, the head of cadet training at the military academy.

Bio graduated from the Military academy as a Second Lieutenant in the Sierra Leone Army in October 1987 at age 23. His first post as a commissioned officer was at the Lungi Garrison in Port Loko District in 1987. Bio was later posted to Kambia District as part of the Economic Emergency Unit, created by President Joseph Saidu Momoh to combat smuggling and other crimes along the Guinean border. In 1988, Bio was again re-posted at Lungi and trained by United Nations forces in aviation security. After the training, Bio was transferred to Benguema as a platoon commander.

In 1990, the Sierra Leone Government contributed military personnel to the West African Peacekeeping Force, ECOMOG, which was mandated to keep the peace in the Liberian civil war. Bio and several other Sierra Leonean soldiers, including Captain Valentine Strasser, and Lt Solomon Musa were deployed to Liberia as part of Sierra Leone's contingent to ECOMOG. At the time, thousands of Liberians were fleeing to Sierra Leone weekly, exposing the country's fragile security and adding to the economic hardship.

After a year in Liberia as an ECOMOG soldier, the Sierra Leone Government ordered Bio and several members of Sierra Leonean soldiers serving in Liberia to immediately return to Sierra Leone and report to the army barracks in Daru, Kailahun District to populate newly formed 600 man battalion of soldiers set up by President Momoh to repel the Revolutionary United Front (RUF) rebels who had attacked villages on the border between Sierra Leone and Liberia, in March 1991. The soldiers included future NPRC members Lieutenant Solomon Musa, Captain Valentine Strasser, Lieutenant Sahr Sandy, and Lieutenant Tom Nyuma.

== Military coups and government ==
=== Participation in 1992 military coup ===
On 29 April 1992, Bio was one of a group of young Sierra Leonean soldiers including Captain Valentine Strasser, Lieutenant Sahr Sandy, Lieutenant Solomon Musa, Lieutenant Tom Nyuma and Captain Komba Mondeh that toppled president Joseph Saidu Momoh's All People's Congress (APC) government in a military coup. The young soldiers formed the National Provisional Ruling Council (NPRC) with Strasser as their leader and Head of State of Sierra Leone.

Bio's first appointment following the formation of the NPRC was as the Secretary of State South, stationed in the country's second capital Bo. He was later moved to Freetown to serve as Secretary of State in charge of Information and Broadcasting. At that point, he was promoted to Captain alongside other junior lieutenants. As a leading member of the coup that kicked out the APC government, Bio served as Supreme Council of State member throughout the NPRC's stay in power and when Strasser's deputy, captain S. A. J. Musa, was sacked and exiled to the UK, Bio was appointed to the position of Deputy Chairman of the NPRC.

=== 1996 military coup ===
On 16 January 1996, Bio led a military coup, ousting Captain Valentine Strasser, following a dispute within the governing Supreme Council of State (SCS) over whether to seek peace with the RUF before multi-party elections, planned for March 1996, or go ahead with the election notwithstanding the ongoing war in the country, and the conditions for participation (or disqualification) of junta members in the elections.

The coup was backed by many high-ranking NPRC soldiers including Colonel Tom Nyuma, Lieutenant Colonel Komba Mondeh, Lieutenant Colonel Reginald Glover, Lieutenant Colonel Idriss Kamara, and Lieutenant Colonel Karefa-Kargbo. Captain Valentine Strasser, then the leader of the NPRC and the military Head of State of Sierra Leone, was handcuffed at gunpoint by his own military bodyguards who were supposed to protect him, and was immediately flown into exile in a military helicopter to Conakry, in neighboring Guinea.

== After the military ==
After retiring from the military in 1996, Bio moved to the United States, where he earned a master's degree in International Affairs from American University in Washington, DC. He bought a small house outside of Washington D.C. in September 2001.

He also served as the president of International Systems Science Corporation, a consulting and investment management firm based in the United States.

== Political comeback and SLPP leadership ==
Bio officially became a member of the Sierra Leone People's Party (SLPP) in 2005. That same year, Bio sought the leadership of the Sierra Leone People's Party (SLPP) at its national convention in Makeni on 3 to 4 September 2005; he took third place, with 33 votes, behind Vice President Solomon Berewa, who received 291 votes, and Charles Margai, who won 34 votes. J.B. Dauda polled 28 votes.

On the night of 31 July 2011, members of the SLPP forced their way during the SLPP convention, which was held at the Youyi Building in the heart of Freetown, and declared Bio as the SLPP's 2012 presidential candidate. In the national election, he faced off with President Ernest Bai Koroma of the ruling APC and was defeated, winning 37% of the vote, but established the SLPP as the only viable opposition party in Sierra Leone.

Maada Bio subsequently enrolled as a PhD student in peace studies at the University of Bradford.

== President of Sierra Leone (2018–present) ==
=== 2018 election ===
Julius Maada Bio was selected as President of Sierra Leone in a run-off election held 31 March 2018. He gained 51.8 percent of the votes, according to official results from Sierra Leone's National Elections Commission. He succeeded Ernest Bai Koroma of the APC who had been president since 2007, and who had to step down from his post having reached the constitutional term limit.

=== Domestic policy ===
In his first month in office, Bio became the first Sierra Leonean president to introduce free education through executive order for primary and secondary school students in public schools throughout Sierra Leone, starting the next school year in the fall of 2018. Bio has also eliminated application fees for students in government-run public universities across Sierra Leone. Bio cancelled a China-funded four hundred million dollar loan agreement with the previous Sierra Leone president Ernest Bai Koroma to build a new international airport in Sierra Leone.

In his first two months in office, Bio opened an ongoing review and audit of all government mining contracts, ministry departments, and other government agencies in the immediate past government of Ernest Bai Koroma. In his first two months in office, Bio sacked all of Sierra Leone's ambassadors and permanent representatives abroad in the immediate past government of Ernest Bai Koroma. In his first two months in office, Bio appointed his cabinet ministers, including the appointment of an opposition leader, Charles Margai, who served briefly as the country's Attorney General and Minister of Justice.

Bio's administration, led by his Chief Minister David J. Francis, issued an investigative report accusing former president Ernest Bai Koroma and his previous government of widespread financial corruption. The allegations against Koroma include stealing millions of dollars from government revenue, selling of state properties, selling significant amounts of a state mining company, stealing funds meant for the country's victims of Ebola and the mudslide; and stealing funds meant to help some poor Sierra Leonean Muslims to go on Hajj. On Bio's orders, the Sierra Leone Justice Ministry has set up a commission of judges, led by an international judge, to investigate the allegations against the previous government.

In February 2019, President Bio declared a state of emergency in Sierra Leone due to endemic sexual violence. He increased penalties for rape and other sexual violations. The state of emergency was rescinded that June. In 2022, he announced that his cabinet unanimously supported a bill to expand access to abortion in the country. In January 2023, President Bio signed into law the Gender Equality and Women's Empowerment Bill, requiring parliamentary and local council elections to include women as at least 30% of candidates.

Bio's opponents have criticized him about the country's poor economic conditions. In August 2022, anti-government protests, sparked by the country's cost of living crisis, called for Bio's resignation and resulted in several deaths. Bio considered the protests to be an insurrection aiming to overthrow the government. On 21 June 2023, days before the 2023 Sierra Leonean general election, another violent protest occurred outside the All People's Congress headquarters, resulting in at least one death.

=== Foreign policy ===
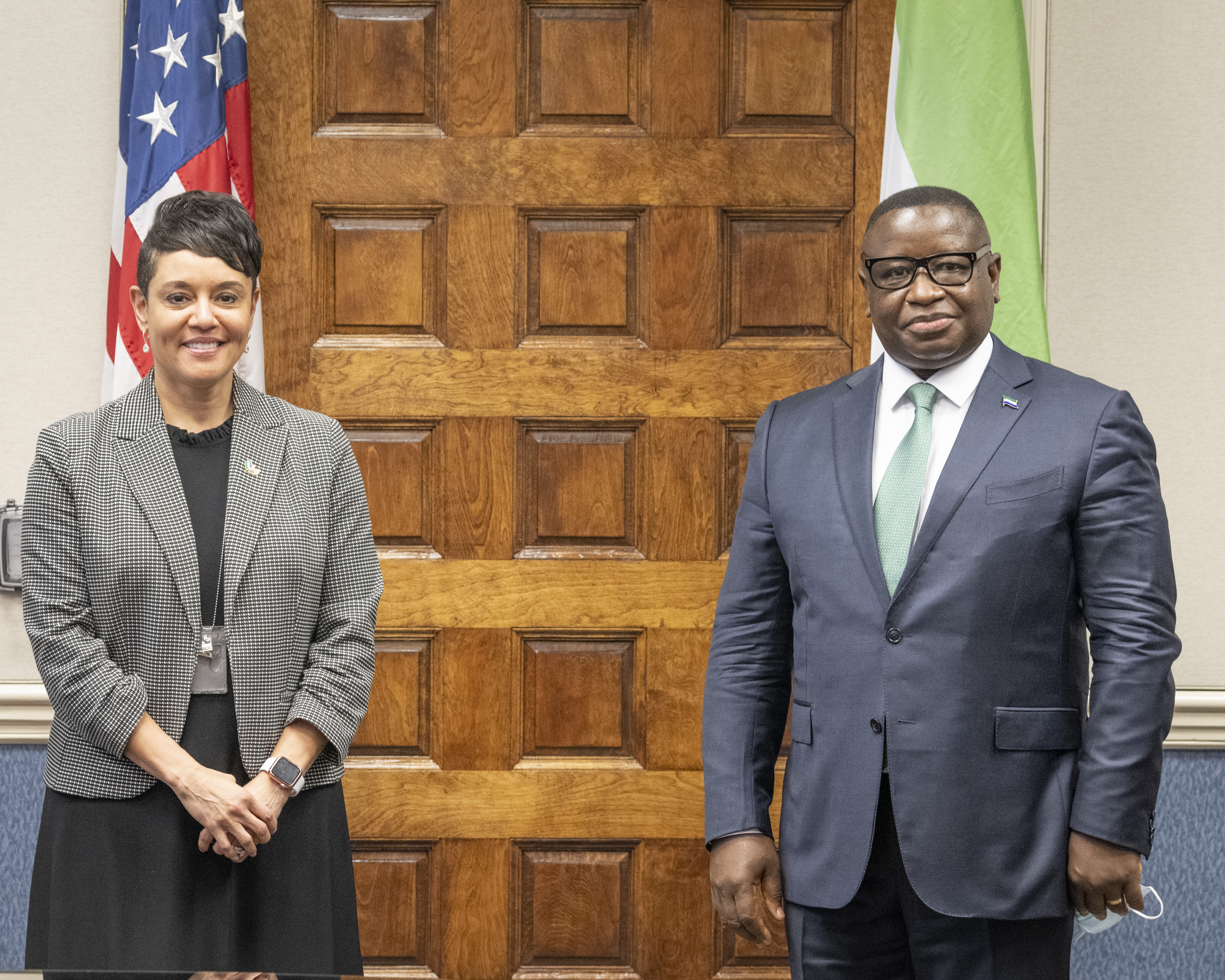
Bio with U.S. Deputy Agriculture Secretary Jewel H. Bronaugh in 2021

President Bio attended the Global Education Summit in July 2021, and said on Twitter that he had "a zestful and productive meeting with Prime Minister Boris Johnson." He added that he "had a forward-looking and reassuring discussion on strengthening our relationship and building back better after COVID.". Bio was one of few heads of state invited "because of his efforts in increasing access to education through the Free Quality Education Programme and breaking down gender barriers to increase girls' enrolment in schools in the last three years." In March 2022, President Bio visited Vietnam.

In May 2023, Bio urged an end to the Russian invasion of Ukraine "for the sake of humanity", stating that he believes "even those who sympathise with Russia are in favour of stopping this war". Amid his 2023 candidacy for reelection, Bio indicated that he hopes diplomacy led by African leaders can help broker an end to the war.

=== 2023 election ===
Bio was one of thirteen candidates in the 2023 Sierra Leonean general election. His main opponent was Samura Kamara of the All People's Congress. He was pronounced the winner with 56% of the vote. This pronouncement was criticized by local and international elections observers, citing a lack of transparency in the counting process, and opposition leader Kamara rejecting the outcome.

=== Alleged associations with Jos Leijdekkers ===
In early 2025, multiple media outlets reported on the presence of Dutch cocaine trafficker Jos Leijdekkers in Sierra Leone. Leijdekkers, sentenced in absentia to 24 years in prison by a Dutch court for smuggling over seven tonnes of cocaine, was reportedly in Sierra Leone since early 2023.

A video surfaced showing Leijdekkers attending a church service in Freetown on 1 January 2025, seated two rows behind President Julius Maada Bio. He was accompanied by a woman identified by sources as Agnes Bio, one of Bio's daughters from his first marriage, who was reportedly married to Leijdekkers. In 2025 they had a child together.

Investigations by Africa Confidential suggest that Leijdekkers integrated into Sierra Leone's elite circles, allegedly taking over existing cocaine smuggling networks and recruiting members of the national security infrastructure to provide logistical and security services.

The Dutch government has expressed concerns over the lack of action by Sierra Leonean authorities regarding Leijdekkers' status.

=== Elected president of Ecowas 2025 ===
On June 22, 2025, Julius Maada Bio was elected president of the West African Economic Community (ECOWAS), during an ordinary summit of heads of state, held in Abuja, Nigeria.

== Honours ==
=== Foreign honours ===
- Liberia:
  - Grand Cordon of the Order of the Pioneers of Liberia (26 July 2019)

=== Honorary doctorates ===
- China University of Geosciences (Wuhan) (2 March 2024)

== Personal life ==
Maada Bio is an ethnic Sherbro and a practicing Roman Catholic. Bio's wife, Fatima, a Nollywood actress, is a practising Muslim and a Gambian-Sierra Leonean national, though she grew up in Kono District in Sierra Leone; her mother was born in Kono District, Sierra Leone, and her father is a Gambian native. Bio and Fatima were married in 2013 in London in an interfaith wedding ceremony that was held in a church with later mosque prayer services in London. The couple have one child together that was born in London. Bio has three other children from a previous marriage, all born in the United States. The couple met in 2012 when Maada Bio was fundraising among the Sierra Leone diaspora in London.

After Maada Bio became president, his family has purchased luxury real estate. His wife, Fatima, bought two villas, an apartment building, and a flat in Gambia. Fatima's mother was listed as the owner of a $0.5 million luxury villa, while her two brothers also registered properties and embarked on construction projects. Fatima's relatives spent over $2.1 million on at least 10 properties.

== See also ==
- List of current heads of state and government
- List of heads of the executive by approval rating

== Notes ==
Political offices
Preceded by Valentine Strasser	Head of State of Sierra Leone; 1996	Succeeded by Ahmad Tejan Kabbah
Preceded by Ernest Bai Koroma	President of Sierra Leone; 2018–present	Incumbent
Party political offices
Preceded by Solomon Berewa	SLPP nominee for President of Sierra Leone; 2012, 2018	Most recent
