= Mohamed Kamarainba Mansaray =

Sierra Leonean politician

Leader of the Alliance Democratic Party (ADP)
- In office 2015–present

Personal details
- Born: Port Loko, Sierra Leone
- Party: Alliance Democratic Party
- Children: Hamed; Sierra Leona; Sahid Mohamed; Zaheena
- Education: Howard University Chicago School of Professional Psychology
- Profession: Psychologist

Mohamed Mansaray widely known as Kamarainba, is a Sierra Leonean politician, psychologist, and the current leader and chairman of the Alliance Democratic Party (ADP), a left wing populist political party he formed in Sierra Leone in opposition of the country"s two main political parties, the ruling APC party and the main opposition SLPP.

Kamarainba is a left wing populist politician, who says he represents the poor Sierra Leoneans who have been neglected by the government for too long. He is an outspoken critic of Sierra Leone's political elites, especially Sierra Leone"s president Ernest Bai Koroma and his ruling APC party.

Kamarainba was born in Port Loko in the north of Sierra Leone but he was raised in Koidu Town in eastern Sierra Leone.

Kamarainba was previously a prominent member of the APC party United States branch, before he fell out with the most senior members of the APC in Sierra Leone in 2014. He ultimately left the APC and formed his own political party called the Alliance Democratic Party (ADP) in 2015.

Mansaray ran for Parliament in 2015 as a member of the ADP party in constituency 030 in Bombali District, but he lost a close race to the APC candidate Ibrahim Ben Kargbo, a close ally of president Koroma.

Mansaray has a Bachelor of Science in Sociology from Howard University, and a Master's degree in Psychology from Chicago School of Professional Psychology.

Mansaray is a muslim, and a native of Port Loko District in the north of Sierra Leone. He is divorced with four children

== Early life and education ==
Mohamed Kamarainba Mansaray was born in the town of Port Loko, Port Loko District in the Northern Province of Sierra Leone to devout Muslim parents; and a devout Muslim himself. Mohamed K Mansaray's father was Alhaji Alimamy Mansaray, a native of Lunsar, Port Loko District, and his mother was Haja Kadiatu Jah, a native of Gbinti, Port Loko District. Mohamed K Mansaray grew up in Koidu Town, Kono District in Eastern Sierra Leone with his parents. Mohamed K Mansaray attended the United Methodists Church Boys Primary School in Koidu Town and the Ansarul Islamic Primary School also in Koidu Town. Mohamed K Mansaray attended the Magburaka Boys Secondary School in Magburaka and the Ahmadiyya Muslim Secondary School in Freetown.

Mohamed K Mansaray moved to the United States in 1997 during the Sierra Leone Civil War. Mansaray earned a Bachelor of Science in Sociology from Howard University, and a Master's degree in Psychology from Chicago School of Professional Psychology. Mansaray worked as Director of Residential Services in various Human Services Agencies in the United States.

== Political career ==
Mohamed K Mansaray was previously a member of the All People's Congress (APC). He fell out with the senior leaders of the APC party. He left the APC and formed his own political party in 2015 called the Alliance Democratic Party. Mansaray is an outspoken critic of the APC administration of president Ernest Bai Koroma.

Mansaray ran for Parliament in 2015 as a member of the ADP party in constituency 030 in Bombali District, but he lost a close race to the APC candidate Ibrahim Ben Kargbo, a close ally and senior adviser to president Ernest Bai Koroma. Mansaray ran for parliament again in constituency 050 in Marampa Chiefdom in Port Loko District in 2016, but he lost another close race to the APC candidate Osman Karankay Conteh.

== Personal life ==
Mohamed K Mansaray is a devout Muslim. He is Married with three Children. All of his three children were born in the United States. His first child, a son Hamed, was born in 1999; his second child, a daughter, Sierra Leona was born in 2007; and his third child Sahid, was born in 2009 and 4th child Zaheena born in 2015. Mansaray is also a businessman. He has three businesses that are registered and operate in Sierra Leone; Embassy Hotels, VIP Constitution and Logistics, Patriotic Insurance Company, the Patriotic Security and Logistic Company and the Patriotic Shipping, Clearing and Forwarding Company.
