= Bumbuna II Hydroelectric Power Station =

Hydroelectric power station in Sierra Leone

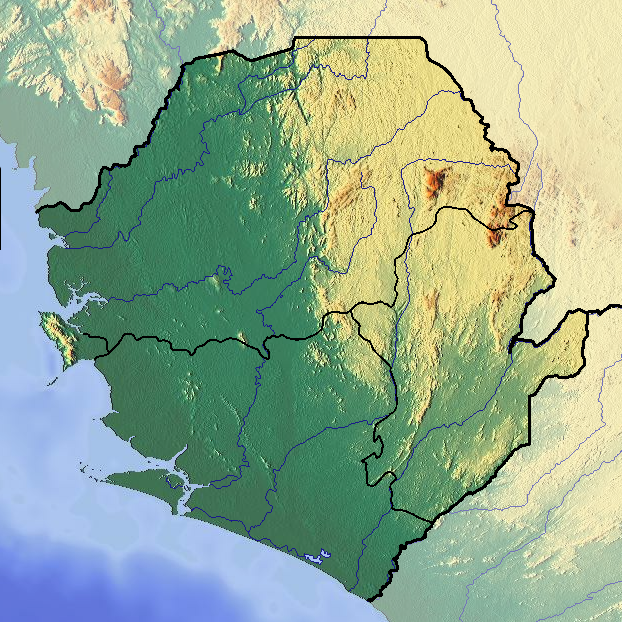
- Map of Sierra Leone showing the location of Bumbuna II Dam
- Country: Sierra Leone
- Location: Bumbuna, Tonkolili District, Northern Province
- Coordinates: 09°04′19″N 11°43′21″W
- Status: Proposed
- Construction cost: US$750 million
- Owner: Joule Africa Limited
- Operator: Joule Africa Limited

Dam and spillways
- Impounds: Seli River

Reservoir
- Normal elevation: 300 m (980 ft)

Power Station
- Operator: Seli Hydropower Company
- Commission date: 2026 Expected
- Type: Run-of-the-river
- Installed capacity: 143 MW (192,000 hp)

Bumbuna II Hydroelectric Power Station is a planned 143 megawatts (192,000 hp) hydroelectric power station in Sierra Leone. The power plant is under development by a consortium of renewable energy IPPs and investors, led by Joule Africa Limited. The energy generated here will be sold to Electricity Distribution and Supply Authority (EDSA), the electricity utility company of Sierra Leone, under a 25-year power purchase agreement.

In July 2025 it was reported that the Sierra Leone government had abandoned the project because the cost was unsustainable.

== Location ==
The power station would be located across the Seli River (Rokel River), outside the town of Bumbuna, in Tonkolili District, in the Northern Province of Sierra Leone. This location is approximately 7.3 kilometres (5 mi), by road, northeast of downtown Bumbuna, adjacent to the 50 megawatt Bumbuna I Hydroelectric Power Station. Bumbuna is located approximately 48 kilometres (30 mi) by road northeast of the city of Magburaka, the district capital. This is about 232 kilometres (144 mi) by road, northeast of Freetown, the county's capital and largest city. Bumbuna II will be an extension of Bumbuna I, with similar geographical coordinates at 9°04'19.0"N, 11°43'21.0"W (Latitude:09.071944; Longitude:-11.722500).

== Overview ==
Bumbuna I Hydropower Station is a 50 megawatt installation owned by the government of Sierra Leone. The power station which cost US$327 million to build, was commissioned in 2009. However its output is not enough to meet the country's electricity needs.

The new plan is to build a new power station (Bumbuna II), with capacity of 143 megawatts, adjacent to the first one with capacity of 50 megawatts (Bumbuna I). This involves expansion of the Bumbuna I Dam and the construction of a new dam at Yiben, approximately 35 kilometres (22 mi) upstream of the Bumbuna I Dam.

At Bumbuna, a new intake channel will be built approximately 400 metres (1,300 ft) upstream of the existing dam. Two Francis-type turbines each rated at 42.15 megawatts and one 3.7 megawatts turbine will be installed here for a total of 88 megawatts in new capacity.

At Yiben, the dam there will measure 83 metres (272 ft) in height and will be 730 metres (2,400 ft) wide. It will be a "roller compacted concrete (RCC) gravity dam", creating a lake with a surface area measuring 115 square kilometres (44 mi^{2}). The powerhouse at Yiben will have two Francis turbines each rated at 27.7 megawatts installed for a total of 55.4 megawatts in new capacity.

== Ownership ==
Bumbuna II, with new generation capacity of 143.4 megawatts, is owned and will be developed, operated and maintained by Seli Hydropower Limited (SHPL). SHPL is a joint venture between Joule Africa, a renewable energy IPP headquartered in London, United Kingdom and Energy Services Company (ESCO), based in Freetown, Sierra Leone.

== Construction, funding and timeline ==
The construction budget is quoted at US$750 million. Funding sources include (a) the African Development Bank (AfDB) (b) the European Commission (EC), through the Electrification Financing Initiative (ElectriFI) (c) Private Infrastructure Development Group (PIDG) and (d) Emerging Africa Infrastructure Fund (EAIF).

== Other considerations ==
The 88 megawatts generated at Bumbuna II, will be evacuated via a new 225kV double-circuit transmission line to a substation located about 4 kilometres (2 mi) south-west of the Bumbuna II powerhouse. The 55.4 megawatts generated at Yiben will be transferred to Bumbuna II, thorough a new single-circuit transmission line measuring approximately 34 kilometres (21 mi).

The 50 megawatts generated at Bumbuna I is transferred to Freetown via a 161kV single-circuit transmission line that measures about 200 kilometres (124 mi). It enters the national grid there.

== See also ==
- List of power stations in Sierra Leone
- Bumbuna Dam
