= Karamoh Kabba =

Sierra Leonean writer, novelist and journalist (born 1965)

Karamoh Kabba (born 1965 in Koidu Town, Kono District, Sierra Leone) is a Sierra Leonean author, writer, novelist and journalist. He has written several accounts about the Sierra Leone civil war, such as A Mother’s Saga: An Account of the Rebel War in Sierra Leone and the self-published work Lion Mountain and Morquee: A Political Drama of Wish over Wisdom published by Sierra Leone Writers Series. He has published several short stories and verses of poems on the Web site, Sierra Leone Web.

== Early life and education ==
An ethnic Mandingo, Karamoh Kabba was born and raised in the diamond-rich mining town of Koidu, Kono District, in the Eastern Province of Sierra Leone, and serves as the current Minister of State, Eastern Region under the government of Dr. Ernest Bai Koroma. His parents are from the Mandingo and Kono ethnic groups respectively. He attended the Kono District Education Council (K.D.E.C.) primary school in Koidu Town and the Government Secondary School for Boys in Magburaka in Tonkolili District. His diplomas include the GCE Ordinary and Advance Levels. He pursued higher education at Montgomery College, Maryland, USA. Kabba served the government of Sierra Leone as National Coordinator of Open Government Initiative (OGI), Director of Political and Public Affairs and Deputy Minister of Political and Public Affairs. Kabba is the founder, president and chief executive officer of Sierra Leone Youth Lending Hand, Inc. (SLYLH), a nonprofit organization devoted to assisting the youth of Sierra Leone educationally and medically and later founded and published the Timbuktu-Vision Monthly Magazine in the USA.
