= Sam Sesay =

Joseph Sam Sesay

Sierra Leone Minister of Agriculture
- Incumbent
- Assumed office 14 October 2007

Personal details
- Born: 1959 (age 66–67) Kamasasa, Kambia District, British Sierra Leone
- Party: All People's Congress (APC)
- Education: Magburaka Technical Institute: Magburaka, Sierra Leone; Russian Academy of Sciences: Moscow, Russia

Joseph Sam Sesay (born April 26, 1959, in Kamasasa, Kambia District, British Sierra Leone) is a Sierra Leonean politician who served as Minister of Agriculture under the All People Congress government of President Ernest Bai Koroma.
