= Mamunta Mayosso Wildlife Sanctuary =

Game reserve in Sierra Leone

Coordinates: 8°34′59″N 12°10′00″W

The Mamunta Mayosso Wildlife Sanctuary is a game reserve in Tonkolili District, Northern Province, Sierra Leone. It is one of the few areas in the country that protects the threatened Dwarf Crocodile as well as being home to 252 bird species despite its small size. It is situated between Magburaka (30 km to the Northeast) and Yonibana (35 km to the Southwest).

The site is important for the economy and culture of the local people and is the first site to be managed as Wildlife Sanctuary in Sierra Leone. Eight species of primates are known to occur in this sanctuary, in addition to other big game such as bushbuck, bushpig, genets and duikers. The threatened primate species are Western Chimpanzee (En) and Red Colobus monkey (Vu). Other threatened fauna are Pygmy Hippo (NT) and Dwarf Crocodile.

== Sources ==
- Mamunta Mayosso Wildlife Sanctuary
- Satellite image of Mamunta Mayosso Wildlife Sanctuary at the Sierra Leone Encyclopedia 2006
