= Sidique Mansaray =

Sierra Leonean footballer

Personal information
- Date of birth: 23 July 1980 (age 46)
- Place of birth: Koidu Town, Sierra Leone
- Position: Striker

Senior career*
Years	Team	Apps	(Gls)
1996–1997	Diamond Stars		
1999–2004	East End Lions		
2004–2006	Cenegal FC		
2006–2007	Old Edwardians		
2007–2015	East End Lions		

International career
2000–2012	Sierra Leone	14	(3)
- * Club domestic league appearances and goals

Sidique Mansaray (born 23 July 1980) is a Sierra Leonean former footballer who played as a striker. He was a regular member of the Sierra Leone national team. in 2001, he scored the only goal as the Leone Stars defeated Nigeria 1-0 in a 2002 FIFA World Cup qualifying match in Freetown.

== Profile ==
Sidique Mansaray was born and raised in Sierra Leone's fourth largest city of Koidu Town, Kono District, to prominent Mandingo parents. He attended the Koidu Secondary School in Koidu Town. He started his professional football career with his hometown club, the Diamond Stars, in the Sierra Leone National Premier League in 1996 at a very young age and made his senior international debut for Sierra Leone in 1997.
