= Bumbuna Dam =

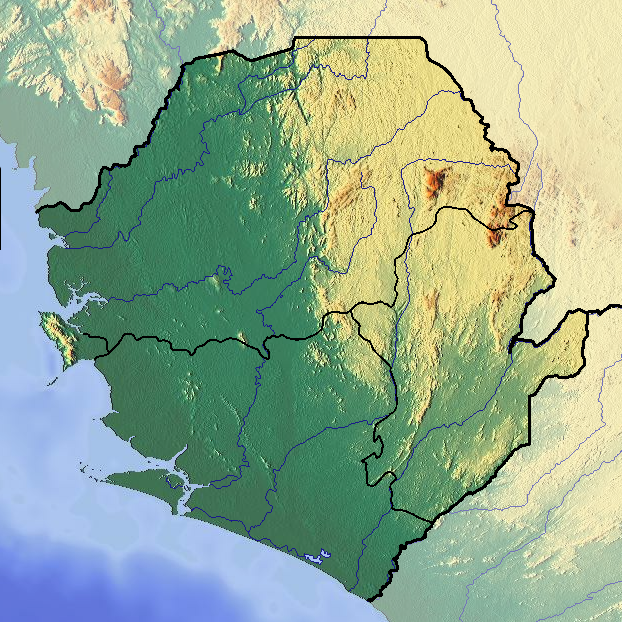
- Location within Sierra Leone
- Country: Sierra Leone
- Location: Bumbuna
- Coordinates: 9°4′17.38″N 11°43′22.43″W
- Purpose: Power
- Status: Operational
- Construction began: 1979
- Opening date: 2009
- Construction cost: US$327 million

Dam and spillways
- Type of dam: Embankment, concrete-face rock-fill
- Impounds: Seli River
- Height: 88 m (289 ft)
- Length: 440 m (1,440 ft)
- Spillway type: Bell-mouth

Reservoir
- Total capacity: 445×10^{6} m^{3} (361,000 acre⋅ft)
- Catchment area: 3,920 km^{2} (1,510 sq mi)
- Surface area: 21 km^{2} (8.1 sq mi)

Power Station
- Commission date: 2009
- Turbines: 2 x 25 MW (34,000 hp) Francis-type
- Installed capacity: 50 MW (67,000 hp)
- Website https://web.archive.org/web/20140221061321/http://www.bumbuna.sl/

The Bumbuna Dam is a concrete-face rock-fill dam on the Seli River near Bumbuna in Tonkolili District, Sierra Leone, and 350 kilometres (220 mi) from the capital of Freetown, the main consumer. The country's first hydroelectric dam, it supports a 50-megawatt (67,000 hp) power station.

The site for the dam at Bumbuna Falls was first identified in 1971, and construction was begun in 1975. Work was halted in May 1997, about 85% completed, due to the Sierra Leone Civil War, and did not restart until 2005. The project was completed and went online in 2009. Nearly a third of the dam's US$327 million cost ($103 million) was supplied by the African Development Bank. A 26 January 2005 report noted that 33 villages would be affected by the dam, although only one (of 16 households and 135 people) would require resettlement.

The dam has a maximum height of 87 metres (285 ft), a length of 400 metres (1,300 ft) at the crest and a volume of 2,500,000 cubic metres (88,000,000 cu ft). The volume of the reservoir created is 410,000,000 cubic metres (1.4×10^{10} cu ft), 428,000,000 cubic metres (1.51×10^{10} cu ft) or 480,000,000 cubic metres (1.7×10^{10} cu ft). There are two Francis turbines, each rated for 25 megawatts (34,000 hp).

After completion, the project has been plagued with problems, and barely produces 10 megawatts (13,000 hp) or 25 megawatts (34,000 hp) as of 2013.

A second phase is planned, for a 110-megawatt (150,000 hp) power station. In June 2011, the government announced it had awarded the $750 million Phase II project to Joule Africa, a UK-based company. This will entail a second dam and plant. Construction was set to begin in 2014 and continue on until at least 2017.

== See also ==
- Bumbuna II Hydroelectric Power Station
