= Mary Musa =

Sierra Leonean politician

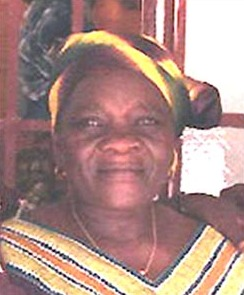
Musa in 2003

Sia Mary Musa (nee Kaingbanja, died 3 August 2015) was a Sierra Leonean politician and activist from Koidu-Sefadu, Kono District. She was the mayor of Koidu from May 2004 to July 2008.

== Early career ==
Mary Musa lived and worked in her home city of Koidu, the capital and largest city of the diamond-rich Kono District in the Eastern Province of Sierra Leone, and the country's fourth largest city. She taught and worked in various schools in the area, including the Jaima Secondary School, Koidu Secondary School, and the United Methodist Church Girls School, of which she was the head teacher for 25 years.

== Exile and return to Koidu ==
When the Sierra Leone Civil War broke out, Mary Musa went into exile, returning to Koidu when the war was over. Large parts of the city's infrastructure had been destroyed in her absence, including some of the school buildings where she had taught, and large scale death had left numerous orphans. Musa worked to provide shelter for her own children and several of these orphans, using bricks from the school to build small houses. Following her lead, many of the other teachers assisted with this process.

== Political career ==
Despite considerable opposition, in a traditionally male dominated region, Mary Musa went on to become the first female mayor and chairperson of the Koidu council. Following her appointment, the United States government's USAID agency trained her with a Nation Building course, as well as leadership training.

== Personal life and death ==
Mary Musa married Mr. S.E.K. Musa, a senior civil servant, before the civil war broke out, but when she returned to the country she discovered that her husband had been killed while she was in exile. She and her husband had five children: Sia Mary Sawyer, Kumba Edna Keili, Finda Eileen Mattia, Yei Gladys Musa, and Sahr Edward Musa, as well as several stepchildren and grandchildren.

She died on 3 August 2015, in Freetown, Sierra Leone's capital.
