= Francis Koroma =

Sierra Leonean footballer (born 1975)

Personal information
- Full name: Francis Zapa Koroma
- Date of birth: 4 January 1975 (age 51)
- Place of birth: Koidu Town, Sierra Leone
- Position: Defender

Team information
- Current team: Sierra Leone (assistant manager)

Senior career*
Years	Team	Apps	(Gls)
1995–2001	Diamond Stars		
2001	Umeå FC		
2002	Kamboi Eagles		

International career
1996–2001	Sierra Leone	24	(3)

Managerial career
- 2018–2023: Old Edwardians
- 2023–: Sierra Leone (assistant manager)
- * Club domestic league appearances and goals

Francis Zapa Koroma (born 4 January 1975) is a Sierra Leonean football coach and former player who is assistant manager of the Sierra Leone national team.

== Playing career ==
Koroma was born in Koidu Town, Sierra Leone. He played as a defender for the Sierra Leone national team as well as the Diamond Stars in Sierra Leone and Umeå FC in Sweden.

Koroma was also a member of the Leone Stars' squad at the 1996 African Nations Cup in South Africa.

== Coaching career ==
Koroma was appointed manager of Old Edwardians who play in the Sierra Leone National Premier League.
