= Government Secondary School for Boys =

Public school in Magburaka, Tonkolili District, Sierra Leone

Magburak Government Secondary School for Boys
- Magburaka; Sierra Leone

Information
- Type: Public School
- Religious affiliation: None
- Established: 1950
- Gender: Boys
- Age: 13 to 18

Magburaka Government Secondary School for Boys is a government-sponsored secondary school based in Magburaka, in the Tonkolili District, Sierra Leone. The school is one of the oldest secondary schools in Sierra Leone. The Magburaka Government Secondary School for Boys has a history of producing some of Sierra Leone's most prominent people, including current Sierra Leone's president Ernest Bai Koroma, minister of Education Minkailu Bah and writer, novelist and author Karamoh Kabba.

== Notable alumni ==
- Ernest Bai Koroma, former President of Sierra Leone
- Minkailu Bah, Sierra Leone's former Minister of Education
- Karamoh Kabba, Sierra Leonean Author and Novelist
- Mohamed Kamarainba Mansaray, Sierra Leonean Politician

== Past Principals ==
- Mr. Mohamed Lamin Sesay, principal from 2007-2022
