= Sory Kessebeh =

Sory Kessebeh (c. 1820–1897) was a Loko leader in the mergent Sierra Leone protectorate during the nineteenth century. His name arose because he wore sebe traditional charms influenced by Islam.

Sory Kessebeh was the son of Sory Kutu who received a military education in Makal, now a small village just over two miles west of Makeni. As he was growing up the Loko people were in conflict with the Temne people. With the final dominance of the Temne, the Loko people dispersed. Sory did not get on with the King, his brother Gbanga Koba-Wa, and so took the opportunity to aid Richard Conray-Ba Caulker of Bumpe by becoming one of his military leader. As a reward he was given Suzerainty of Rotifunk, which during the 1870s prospered under his leadership and attracted many Loko refugees. During the 1880s he was involved in defending Bumpe territory from Temne incursions from the Yoni Chiefdom. He joined the British Yoni Expedition of 1887-8 which led to the decisive defeat of the Yoni.
