= HMS Icarus (1885) =

Sloop of the Royal Navy

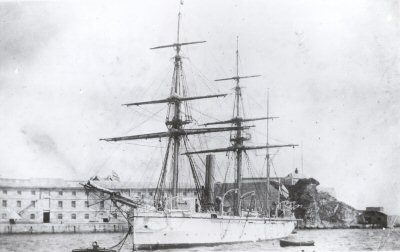
- HMS Icarus

History

United Kingdom
- Name: HMS Icarus
- Builder: Devonport Dockyard
- Cost: Hull: £39,369, Machinery: £12,735
- Laid down: 18 August 1883
- Launched: 27 July 1885
- Commissioned: 6 July 1886
- Fate: Sold 12 April 1904

General characteristics
- Class & type: Mariner-class composite screw sloop
- Displacement: 970 tons
- Length: 167 ft (51 m)
- Beam: 32 ft (9.8 m)
- Draught: 14 ft (4.3 m)
- Installed power: 850 ihp (630 kW)
- Propulsion: 2-cylinder horizontal compound-expansion steam engine; Single screw
- Sail plan: Barquentine-rigged; later barque-rigged
- Speed: 11 1/2 knots (21.3 km/h)
- Range: Approximately 2,100 nmi (3,900 km) at 10 kn (19 km/h)
- Complement: 126
- Armament: As built: 5 × 5-inch 38cwt breech-loading guns; 1 × light gun; 8 × machine guns; After 1890: Additional quick firing guns

HMS Icarus was a Mariner-class composite screw gunvessel of 8 guns, and the third Royal Navy vessel to carry the name. She was launched in 1885 at Devonport and sold in 1904.

== Construction ==
Designed by Nathaniel Barnaby, the Royal Navy Director of Naval Construction, her hull was of composite construction; that is, iron keel, frames, stem and stern posts with wooden planking. She was fitted with a 2-cylinder horizontal compound expansion steam engine driving a single screw, produced by Barrow Iron Shipbuilding. Uniquely among her class she was built rigged with no main yards, making her a barquentine-rigged vessel; the rest of her class were barque-rigged. However, later pictures show her rigged as a barque. Her keel was laid at Devonport Royal Dockyard on 18 August 1883 and she was launched on 27 July 1885 by Miss Julia Wilson, the daughter of Admiral Superintendent Wilson; the launch was originally planned for 11 July but was postponed following the admiral's death on 4 July. Her entire class were re-classified in November 1884 as sloops before they entered service.

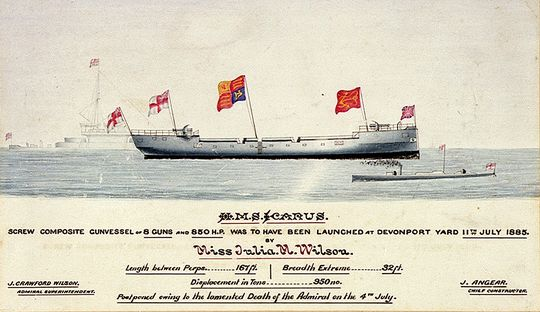
HMS Icarus was launched by Miss Julia M Wilson, the daughter of Admiral Superintendent J. Crawford Wilson in 1885

== Career ==
Icarus was commissioned on 6 July 1886 at Devonport. On 8 October 1889, she ran aground in Plumper Sound whilst on a voyage from New Westminster to Esquimalt, British Columbia, Canada. After returning from the Pacific in 1890 she had additional quick firing (QF) guns added.

The ship's companies of Icarus, Acorn and Rifleman were awarded the West Africa Medal with the bar "1887–1888" for their part in supporting the infantry of the West India Regiment between 13 November 1887 and 2 January 1888 during the Yoni Expedition against the Yoni Chiefdom in Sierra Leone.

In 1890 the levels of desertion and punishment under her commanding officer, Commander Annesley, was sufficiently high to prompt a question in the House of Commons. The reply by the First Lord of the Admiralty, Lord George Hamilton, reveals good reason for the concern, since Icarus only had a total complement of 126:

Commander Annesley was appointed to the Icarus on July 6, 1886. The total number of desertions between July 1, 1886, and September 30, 1889, was 28. During the same period the total number of summary punishments awarded was 619, and there have been three court-martial cases. No complaints as to the discipline on board have been received at the Admiralty, but I shall be quite ready to look into any facts that the hon. Gentleman may have in his possession.

— Lord George Hamilton, First Lord of the Admiralty

An inquiry concluded that Annesley had, as alleged in various newspapers, applied a "punishment not recognised in the Service", and was duly court martialled. He was found guilty and awarded a public reprimand.

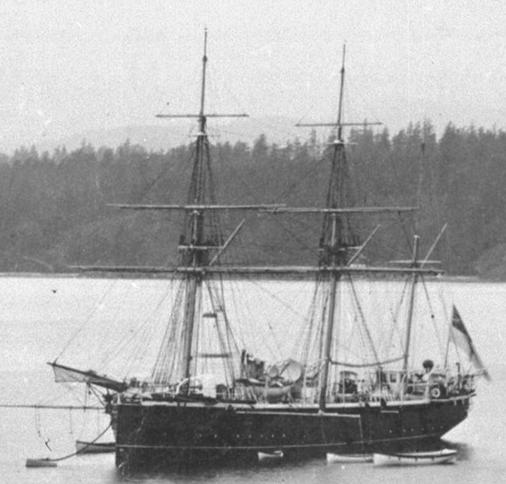
Icarus at Esquimalt c.1900

Her last years were spent on the Pacific Station, based in Esquimalt Royal Navy Dockyard at Esquimalt, in British Columbia, Canada. In early 1900 she visited San Francisco, under Commander George Francis Savage Knowling, and in late Summer 1901 she visited Panama. The following year she returned to the United Kingdom, stopping at Pernambuco and São Vicente, Cape Verde. She arrived at Devonport on 10 May 1902, and proceeded to Sheerness to pay off at Chatham on 4 June 1902, where she was placed in the C Division of the Dockyard reserve.

== Fate ==
Icarus was sold on 12 April 1904.
