= Saa Emerson Lamina =

Saa Emerson Lamina is a Sierra Leonean politician and the Mayor of Koidu Town. Lamina is the youngest mayor in Sierra Leone's history, and at the time of his inauguration was the youngest mayor in West Africa.

== Early life and education ==
Saa Emerson Lamina was born in Koidutown, Kono District, Eastern Sierra Leone, to a head teacher father and a midwife mother. He completed his primary education at the U.M.C. Boys School, Koidu City. Due to the civil war in the country, he attended various secondary schools, including Magburaka Government Secondary School for Boys in Magburaka. He completed a Bachelor of Arts (B.A.Ed) degree in Linguistics, and Double Master's degrees in Educational Administration (M.Ed.) and Peace and Development Studies (MA-PADS) from Njala University.

At Njala University, Lamina rose to the Presidency of Njala University Students Union Government and also served in other capacities, including as President of Kono Student's Union (KONSU); President of Magbaraka Old Boy's Association (MOBA); Coordinator of the Human Rights Clinic (NUC); Editor in Chief of Spectacle Press NU; and Director of Information of the National Union of Sierra Leone Students (NUSS).

== Career ==
Saa Emerson Lamina became mayor of Koidu City in 2012, representing the All People's Congress party. He is the youngest mayor in Sierra Leone's history, and at the time of his inauguration was the youngest Mayor in West Africa.
