= Tane Chiefdom =

Coordinates: 8°40′N 11°49′W

- Chiefdom
- Interactive map of Tane Chiefdom
- Country: Sierra Leone
- Province: Northern Province
- District: Tonkolili District
- Capital: Matotoka
- Time zone: UTC+0 (GMT)

Tane Chiefdom is a chiefdom in Tonkolili District of Sierra Leone. Its capital is Matotoka.
