= Kalansongoia Chiefdom =

- Chiefdom
- Country: Sierra Leone
- Province: Northern Province
- District: Tonkolili District
- Capital: Bumbuna
- Time zone: UTC+0 (GMT)

Kalansongoia Chiefdom is a formerly amalgamated chiefdom in Tonkolili District of Sierra Leone. Its capital was Bumbuna. Now, the Chiefdom has been de-amalgamated into the original Kalanthuba and Dansogoia chiefdoms. Bumbuna remains the capital of the Dansogoia chiefdom. Kalanthuba has both a traditional capital and a capital of governance. The traditional capital is Kasokira and the administrative capital is Kamankay. Kamankay lies directly across the river from Bumbuna.
