= Kman =

Kman may refer to:

- Kman language, a small language spoken in India and China
- Kman, Split, an administrative division of Split, Croatia

== See also ==
- K-man
