= Koidu =

Koidu Town
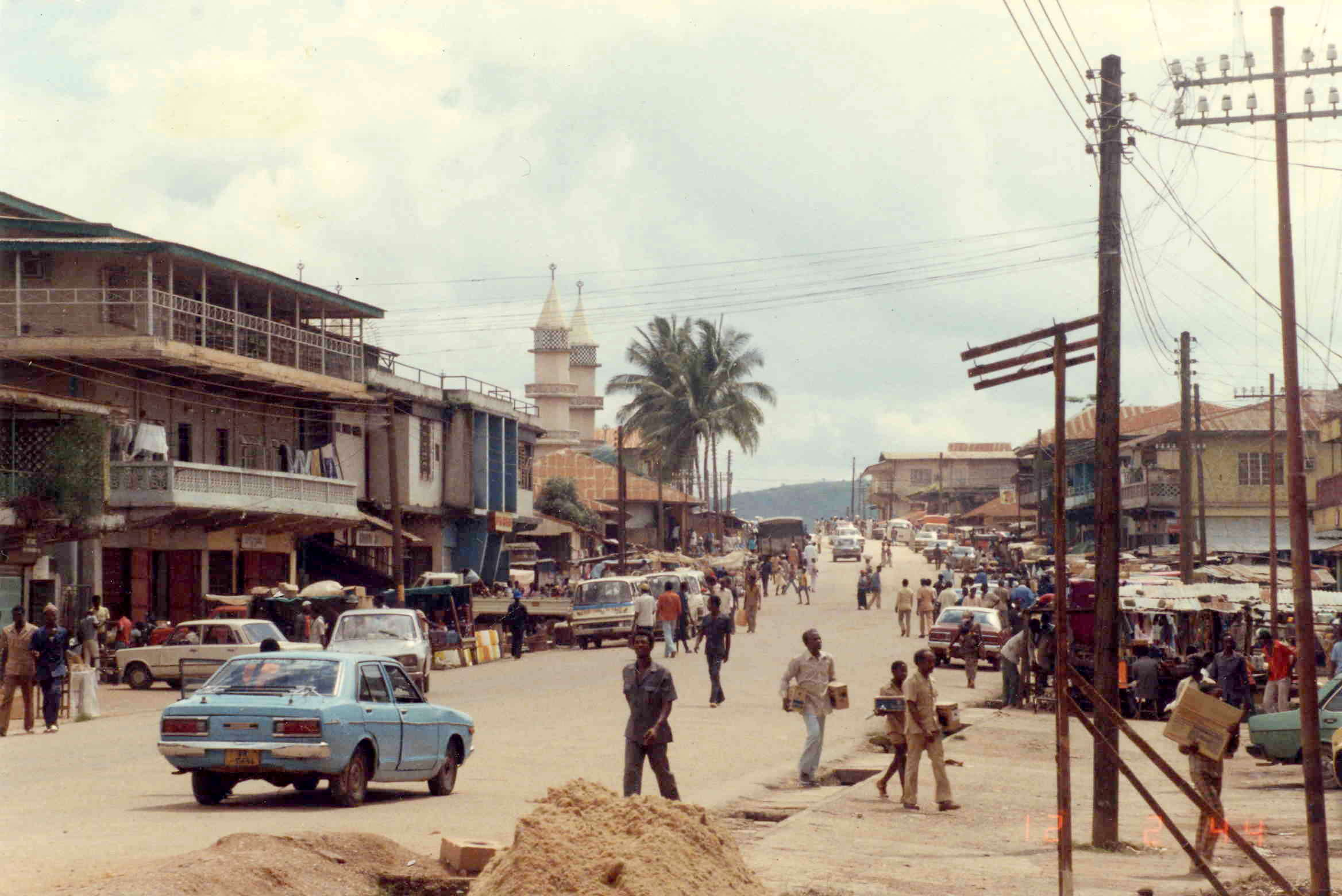
- Main street in Koidu in the 1980s

- Location within Sierra Leone
- Coordinates: 8°38′38″N 10°58′18″W
- Country: Sierra Leone
- Province: Eastern Province
- District: Kono District

Government
  - Type: City Council
  - Mayor: Komba Sam(C4C)
  - Governing Body: Koidu–New Sembehun City Council

Population (2015 census)
  - Total: 128,030
- Time zone: UTC±0 (GMT)

Koidu Town (or Sefadu; officially known as Koidu City) is the capital and largest city of the Kono District in the Eastern Province of Sierra Leone. Its population is 128,030 based on the 2015 census. It is the fifth largest city in Sierra Leone by population, after Freetown, Kenema, Bo and Makeni. It lies approximately 280 miles east of Freetown, and about 60 miles north of Kenema.

Koidu Town is a major urban, business, commercial and diamond trade center. Two of the world's ten largest and most famous rough diamonds were found in the Woyie River that flows through Koidu Town.

The mayor of Koidu City and members of the Koidu-New Sembehun city council are directly elected every four years. The current mayor of Koidu Town is Komba Sam of the Sierra Leone People's Party political party. Koidu is not a stronghold of any political party; the city is home to large support of both the Sierra Leone People's Party and the All People's Congress.

Koidu is one of the most ethnically and religiously diverse cities in Sierra Leone. The city is inhabited by many ethnic groups, with no ethnic group forming a majority. The Krio language is by far the most widely spoken language in Koidu Town and is the primary language of communication in the city. Sierra Leone's vice president Mohamed Juldeh Jalloh, Sierra Leone's First Lady Fatima Bio and Sierra Leone's former vice president Samuel Sam-Sumana were born and raised in the city.

== History ==
In 1995 the government of Sierra Leone signed an agreement with the South African company Branch Energy Limited, a subsidiary of Executive Outcomes (EO), a business that supplied mercenaries to governments across Africa. The agreement, negotiated under the Mines and Minerals Act of 1994, was scheduled to last 25 years. Under it Sierra Leone's military government gave the concession to operate the Koidu diamond mine to the firm in payment for helping to suppress the Revolutionary United Front rebels in the area during the country's civil war. They had been using the diamonds to buy weapons and ammunition from Guinea, Liberia, and the Sierra Leone army. The government of Sierra Leone retained a 60% ownership stake in the Koidu mine.

The Panama Papers, leaked from the Panamanian law firm Mossack Fonseca, showed that the family foundation of Beny Steinmetz family paid $1.2 million for half of the mining license issued by the national government for the Koidu mine. In 2003 the government transferred rights, duties, and responsibilities from Branch Energy to Koidu Holdings, a company owned by Octea of the BSGR Resources group, for $28 million. In 2015, the city filed suit against Octea, claiming that the company owed $684,000 in unpaid property taxes. In April 2016, Justice Bintu Alhadi of the High Court of Sierra Leone ruled that Octea and Koidu Limited were separate entities and that Octea technically did not own the mine, so had no duty to pay its property tax.

In 2012, Saa Emerson Lamina of the ruling All People's Congress party was elected mayor of Koidu. He was suspended by the national government in 2016, following the release of the Panama Papers and the publication of an article quoting him complaining about the diamond mine's operation and failure to pay taxes. The City Council then elected Aiah Bartholomew Baima Komba acting mayor of Koidu. Lamina said the suspension was intended to silence him and that he continued to act as mayor because the national government has no authority to remove him from office A 32-page Ministry of Finance and Economic Development audit blamed the finance and procurement officers of the council for the relatively minor issues.

=== 2007 and 2012 protests ===
The 2007 Koidutown-Sefadu protest was an action by 400 protesters in Koidu-Sefadu which was aimed at the local diamond mine which the residents claimed had lowered local living conditions and environmental conditions in the area. The result of the protest was a clampdown by Sierra Leonean police, who shot two protesters. Two more protesters were shot in 2012, one of them a 12-year-old boy.

== Government ==
Koidu Town is one of Sierra Leone's six municipalities and is governed by a directly elected city council, headed by a mayor, in whom executive authority is vested. The mayor is responsible for the general management of the city. The mayor is elected directly by the residents every four years in a municipal elections.

Komba Sam was elected mayor of Koidu in the 2018 Koidu Mayoral election, defeating the Sierra Leone People's Party with 49.5% of the votes.

== Ethnicity ==
Koidu town is one of the most ethnically diverse cities in Sierra Leone. Even though the city is home of the Kono people, members of all the country's other ethnic groups and most of the foreign diamond workers in the Kono District reside in the city.

== Health ==
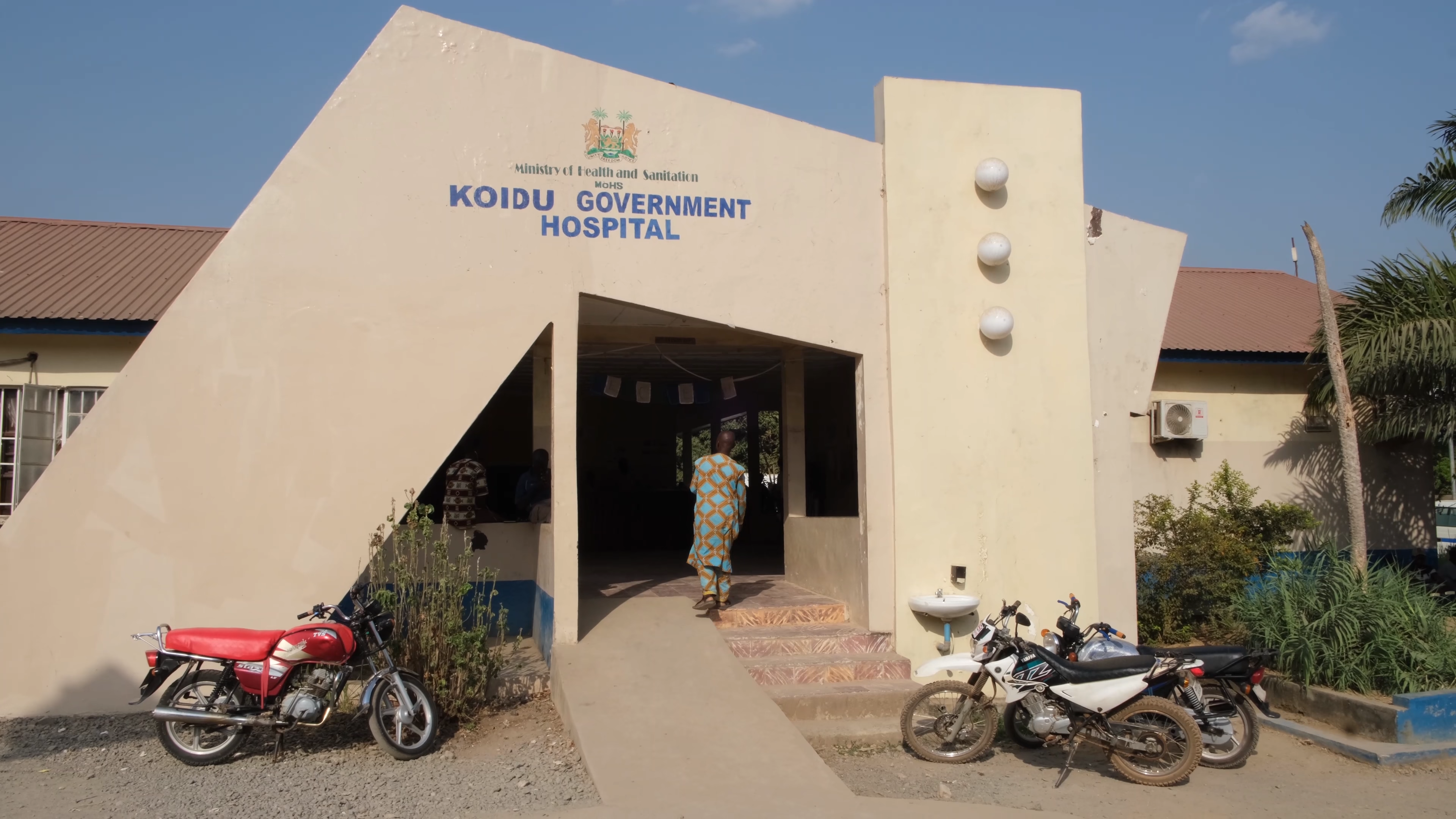
Koidu Government Hospital

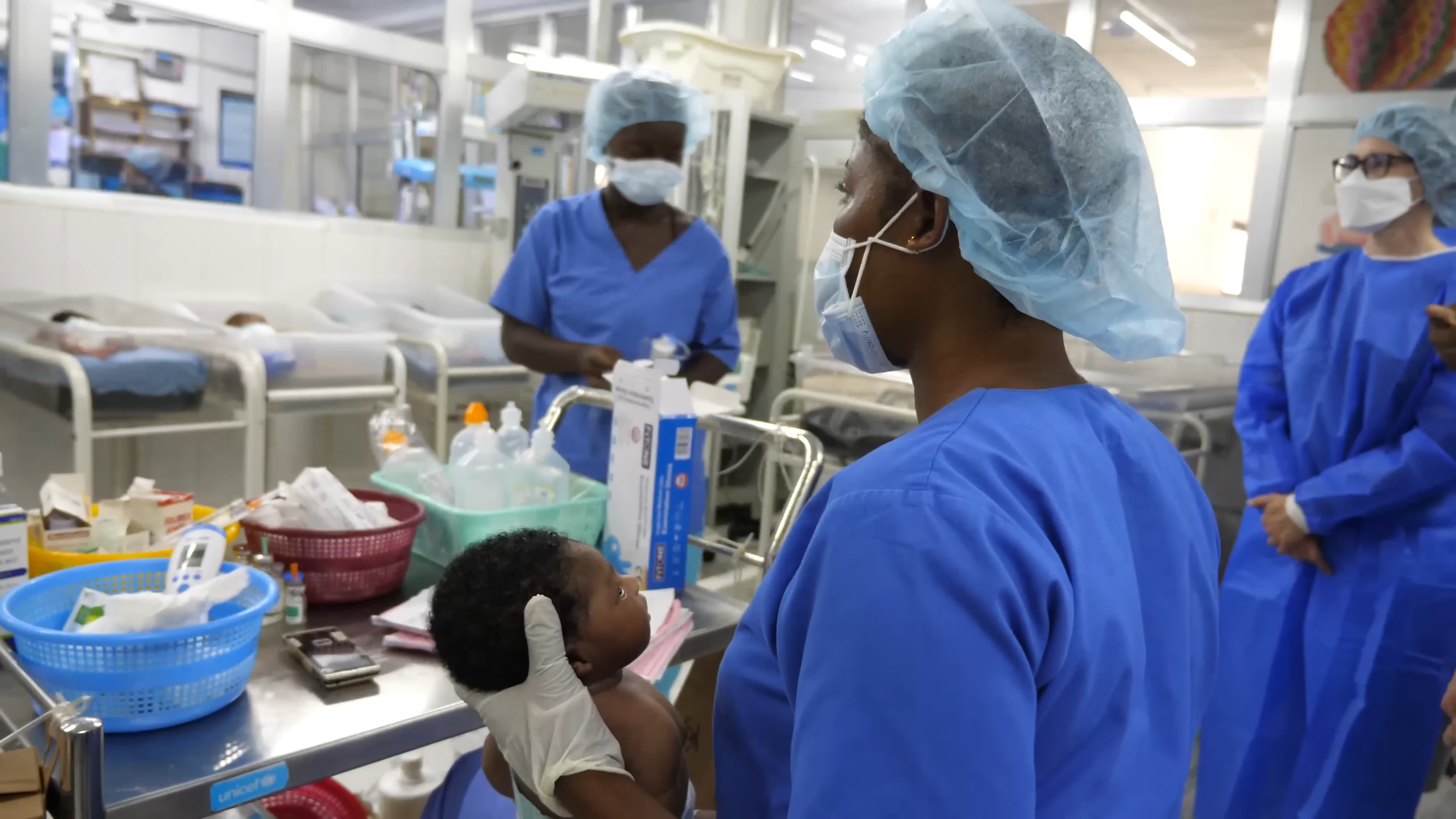
Infant care at the hospital

American aid workers helped rebuild the Koidu Government Hospital, which has improved the previously alarming health situation in the town. Various other aid organizations, including the UN Refugee Agency, UNHCR and its partners, have helped drill wells, re-build clinics and schools and regenerate livelihoods in the area, as part of a programme to support the reintegration of Sierra Leoneans who returned after living for several years as refugees in neighbouring countries.

In 2026, the Paul E. Farmer Maternal Center of Excellence opened in the Koidu Government Hospital campus. The maternity hospital contains the only neonatal intensive care unit in Sierra Leone.

== Culture ==
=== Media ===
The local radio station in Koidu Town is the Eastern Radio 96.5. The Sierra Leone Broadcasting Corporation (SLBC) TV, and radio are on the air in the city. The BBC World Service, CNN International, and several other international stations are also on the air in the city on satellite.

=== Sport ===
Like the rest of Sierra Leone, football is the most popular sport in Koidu Town. A professional football club, Diamond Stars F.C., is based in Koidu Town and represents the Kono District in the Sierra Leone National Premier League. The Diamond Stars Football Club is overwhelmingly popular in Kono District and is one of the biggest football clubs in Sierra Leone. The Diamond Stars were the champions of the 2012 Sierra Leone National Premier League season, and the first club outside Freetown to ever won the Premier League.

== Education ==
=== Secondary Schools in Koidu Town ===
- Koidu Secondary School - Founded: 1938
- Kono Model Academy - Founded: 1950
- Koidu Girls Secondary School - Founded: 1952
- Ansarul Islamic Boys Secondary School - Founded: 1974
- Ansarul Islamic Girls Secondary School - Founded: 1974
- Islamic Secondary School Koidu - Founded: 1979
- Ak-hom Secondary School - Founded: 2001

== Notable people from Koidu town ==
- Mohamed Juldeh Jalloh, current Vice President of Sierra Leone
- Fatima Bio, First Lady of Sierra Leone
- Saa Emerson Lamina, former Mayor of Koidu City
- Samuel Sam-Sumana, Former Vice President of Sierra Leone
- Kaifala Marah, former Finance Minister of Sierra Leone
- Sam Bockarie, former RUF rebel leader
- Mary Musa, First Female Mayor of Koidu City
- Francis Koroma, Footballer
- K-Man, Sierra Leonean Musician
- Karamoh Kabba, Politician
- Komba Yomba, Footballer
- Sidique Mansaray, Footballer
- Alimamy Jalloh, Footballer
- Ibrahim Bah, Footballer
- Mohamed Saccoh, Rapper
- Yayah Jalloh, footballer
