= Magburaka Technical Institute =

- Type: Public
- Established: 1975
- Students: 328
- Location: Magburaka, Sierra Leone
- Campus: Magburaka campus

Magburaka Technical Institute is a two-year technical college located in Magburaka, Tonkolili District, Sierra Leone. It was established in 1975. The school awards diplomas and certificates in areas such as Engineering, Electrician, Carpentry, Plumbing, Business Management and Agricultural science. It is one of the largest technical institutes in Sierra Leone.

== Current programmes ==
- Certificate in Engineering
- Certificate in Carpentry
- Certificate in Plumbing
- Certificate in Electrician
- Certificate in Agricultural study
- Certificate in Business management
