= Anjhula Mya Bais =

Indian-American psychologist and activist

Anjhula Mya Singh Bais
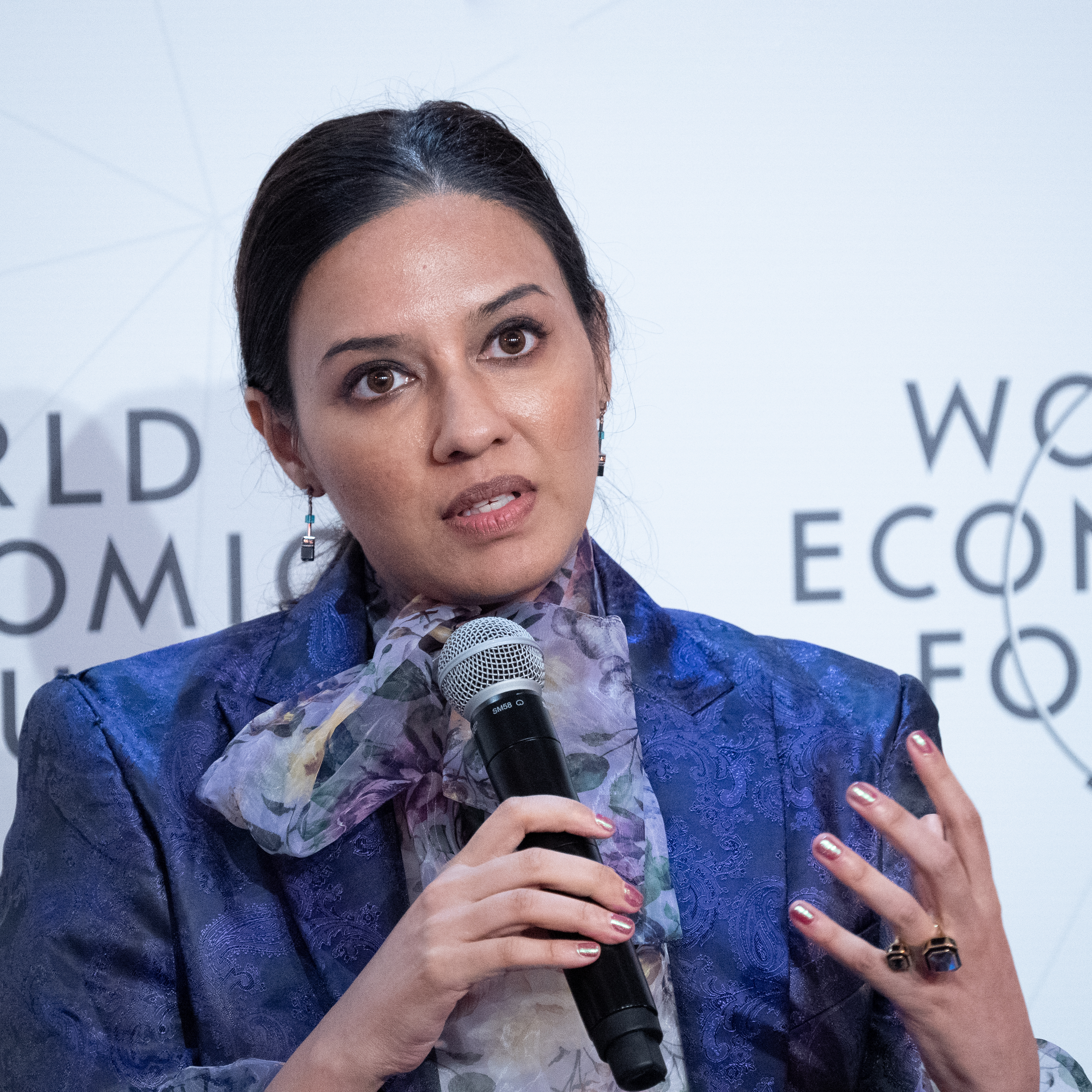
- Bais in 2023
- Born: United States
- Education: University College London, London
- Occupations: International Psychologist; Trauma Specialist; Strategist; Human Rights Activist; Writer; Model
- Years active: 1999-present
- Partner: Satish Selvanathan (m.2010)

Anjhula Bais is an Indian-American international psychologist, trauma specialist, human rights activist and an international model . She was the youngest chair of Amnesty International Malaysia. She was elected as director for Amnesty International at their global assembly in 2019 in Johannesburg, South Africa. She is the first psychologist, the first Indian and first person from Malaysia to do hold this position.

In 2019, Bais was named a World Economic Forum Young Global Leader. In 2020, she was the recipient of the American Psychological Association Citizen Psychologist Citation. She lives in Kuala Lumpur and is married to Satish Selvanathan, a philanthropist and great-great-grandson of Ponnambalam Arunachalam.

== Early life and education ==
=== Early life ===
Bais was born in the US and spent her early childhood in Lucknow, Uttar Pradesh, India. While she was still a young girl, her family moved to the US and they lived in both Chicago, Illinois and Lincoln, Nebraska. Bais is the daughter of Thakur Dr. Birendra Bikram Singh Bais, an agriculture scientist, and Thakurani Asha Singh Bais Kumari. She has two older siblings, her sister Rina and her brother Harish Paul

She stated, “I was unafraid of people, and that’s a requisite of being a psychologist” and “People came naturally to me. My friends would talk to me about their relationships and their parents."

=== Education ===
Bais studied psychology and philosophy at Lady Shri Ram College in New Delhi, India. She completed her master's degree in Psychoanalysis from the University College London. She got admitted for a graduate degree in psychology in Columbia University in New York but later left it and obtained her Doctorate in International Psychology from The Chicago School of Professional Psychology. She obtained her PhD with distinction, focused in International Psychology from The Chicago School of Professional Psychology . Bais practices Nichiren Buddhism since 2005. She was a Fellow of the Apolitical Academy, London and the Oxford University Blavatnik School of Government from 2019 to 2021. Bais was recognized in 2020 as an alumna of University College London, for their professional development programme, UCL Connect.

== Career ==
Bais served as the Chair of Amnesty International Malaysia from 2017 to 2019 where she helped strategize on regional human rights issues such as ICERD and the curbing of freedom of expression. She served as a director of Amnesty International Limited until 7 April 2025. Bais also serves on the Board of Directors for the Institute of Semitic Studies.

Bais and her husband, Satish Selvanathan, were held hostage on the final day of their royal 4-day wedding for 16 hours at gunpoint.

In 2012, Bais and her husband Satish Selvanathan founded the Bais-Selvanathan Foundation.

=== Psychologist ===
Bais started her career as a refugee psychotherapist while studying for masters at University College London and was acclaimed by University College London as an alumna who “gives back to UCL."

Bais was a speaker at the World Economic Forum, Annual Meeting of the New Champions, Dalian, China.

In 2015, Bais went to Mumbai and spent four days with the Dalai Lama discussing the intersection of religion and psychology.

She sits on the Committee of Global Psychology of the American Psychological Association.

== Media and entertainment ==
=== Filmography ===
She is the Executive Producer of Hindi Short Film - Katputliwala (The Puppet master) | Father and Son Relationship by filmmaker Mitakshara Kumar of Bajirao Mastani and Padmaavat fame.

=== Modeling ===
Bais started her career as a model at the age of 18 at a campaign of Banana Republic in New York. She was awarded the “Miss Teen India” while studying at college. She was one of the top 20 finalists in Miss India. She walked the ramp at the London Fashion Week while studying at University College London.

Bais has been on the cover of Ensemble Magazine Peak Women We Love and Life Inspired for The Star Malaysia.

== Recognition ==
- In 2019, Bais was named a World Economic Forum Young Global Leader.
- In 2020, she was the recipient of the American Psychological Association Citizen Psychologist Citation.
- Bais was ranked by The Times of India as one of New Delhi’s Ten Most Beautiful Women.
