= Minkailu Bah =

Sierra Leonean politician and lecturer (died 2020)

Minkailu Bah (died 18 May 2020, Magburaka, Tonkolili District) was a Sierra Leonean politician and lecturer.

He served as Sierra Leone's Minister of Education, Youth and Sports. Born in Magburaka, he was the acting head of the Electrical and Electronics department at Fourah Bay College, University of Sierra Leone before his appointment as a minister.

Bah died from COVID-19 in 2020.
