= Complant =

Chinese contracting and engineering company

China National Complete Plant Import Export Corporation
- Type: State-owned enterprise
- Industry: Construction, sugar processing
- Headquarters: Beijing, People's Republic of China
- Area served: People's Republic of China
- Key people: Chairman: Mr. Liu Xueyi
- Website: www.complant.com

China National Complete Plant Import Export Corporation Ltd. (COMPLANT) is a Chinese company mainly involved in contracting and engineering in the domestic and international markets. In a 2013 ranking compiled by Engineering News-Record of revenue from international contracting work, COMPLANT was listed at number 235 with $154.5 million in international revenue in 2012.

== History ==
COMPLANT was created in the 1980s around the time that China created its Department of Foreign Aid within the Ministry of Foreign Economic Relations and Trade (the Ministry later became the Ministry of Commerce). COMPLANT, which eventually became a state-owned enterprise, was at that point tasked with implementing most of China's overseas development projects.

== Sugar processing ==
The company also has several subsidiaries in the sugar industry.

=== Sierra Leone ===
Complant Magbass Sugar Company is a subsidiary located in Sierra Leone that operates a sugar production facility, in Magbass, Tonkolili District, rehabilitated by the company in 2003. The sugar operations in Sierra Leone have enjoyed the support of the local traditional elder, Paramount Chief, Alhaji Masakama Kanamanka 111, who in a ceremony in November 2012 for the sugar facility lashed out at anybody under his domain who stole equipment or burned the crops of the company.

=== Jamaica ===
The company became a major investor in Jamaica in 2011 with the purchase of three sugar factories in a divestment by the government of Jamaica. The sugar factories were sold for US$9 million with a planned investment of 156 million to follow the purchase in order to rehabilitate the factories. The company moved rapidly on the investment, investing US$8 million in rehabilitation and buying US$20 million in spare parts and materials before taking control of the facilities. For the Jamaican government, the goals behind the sale included improvement of efficiency in the transferred factories and, down the line, the transformation of the Jamaican sugar industry.
