= Kasafoni =

Town in Sierra Leone

- Interactive map of Kasafoni
- Coordinates: 09°07′00″N 11°34′00″W

Kasafoni is a town in northeastern Sierra Leone in the mountainous area near the Guinea border.

== Mining ==
Kasafoni is located within the Tonkolili District, a district in the Northern Province of Sierra Leone, known for its vast iron ore deposits, and located near the Kingho Tonkolili Mine, a large iron ore mine in Farangbaya, a town in Tonkolili District, Northern Province, Sierra Leone, with a large iron ore reserve of approximately 13,800,000 metric tons.
