= Steven Kaufman =

American entrepreneur (born 1977)

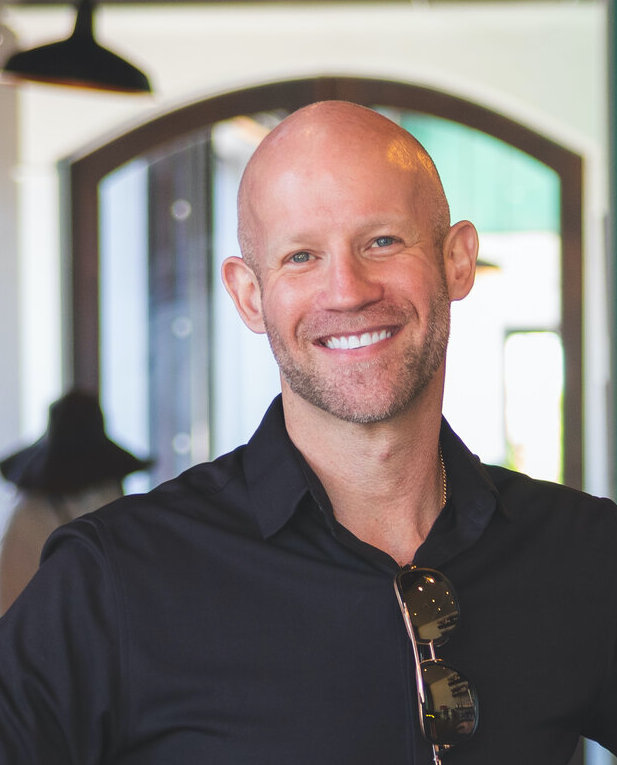
- Born: Steven Kaufman; 1977 (age 48–49); Brooklyn, New York, U.S.
- Education: Ph.D. in Psychology from The Chicago School Master's Degree in Economic Development and Entrepreneurship from the University of Houston Strategic Marketing Management Program at Harvard Business School
- Alma mater: University of Houston
- Occupations: CEO, ZeusLending
- Organization: The Fanatical Change Foundation
- Awards: Houston Business Journal's Most Admired CEO

Steven Kaufman is an American entrepreneur and philanthropist.

He runs real estate finance provider, ZeusLending, and a real estate investment company, Zeus Equity Group. He is the founder of the charity Fanatical Change Foundation. He is also a champion bench presser. He has received awards both for his charity work and his work in the mortgage industry.

== History ==
Steven Kaufman was born in Brooklyn, New York in 1977. Kaufman has a master's degree in Economic Development and Entrepreneurship from the University of Houston. Steven completed the Strategic Marketing Management Program at Harvard Business School, and earned his PhD in psychology, with a thesis on performance psychology, organizational leadership, and group trust, from The Chicago School.

He has since coordinated more than $1 billion in real estate for multiple companies. He later founded the Fanatical Change Foundation charity, which hosts parties and donates 100 percent of every entry ticket to families in need.

== Recognition ==
Steven Kaufman has received recognition for his work in the mortgage industry and his charity. ZeusLending was recognized as one of Houston's fastest-growing companies, in which Kaufman took pride. Kaufman was awarded an honor from National Mortgage Professional Magazine by placing him on their "40 Under 40" list, which annually recognizes top mortgage professionals under the age of 40. He is the only Houston-based mortgage professional included in that year's list. Kaufman was one of the inaugural honorees for Houston Business Journal's Most Admired CEO.

His philanthropic recognition includes the Houston Astros “Hometown Hero”, and the City of Houston “Humanitarian Award."

Kaufman appeared in the Willis Group Distinguished Speaker Series, a series devoted to the discussion of "contemporary business issues." He appeared on FOX 26 News to discuss the FBI probe into the handling of foreclosure document by organizations such as Bank of America and JP Morgan. He also spoke at the University of Houston-Victoria and gave a keynote address there for Business Administration students.
