= Mile 91, Sierra Leone =

- Location in Sierra Leone
- Coordinates: 08°28′00″N 12°13′00″W
- Country: Sierra Leone
- Province: Northern Province
- District: Tonkolili District
- Chiefdom: Yoni Mamaila Chiefdom

Government
  - City council charman: mohamed sankoh
  - local chief: pa limami local title name
  - head of local chiefs: mohamed sankoh
- Time zone: UTC0 (GMT)

Mile 91 is a major trading town in Tonkolili District in Northern Province of Sierra Leone. As its name suggests, Mile 91 is exactly 91 miles from Freetown and is located on the main highway linking Freetown, to Makeni and Bo. The population of the town is ethnically diverse, although the Temne people make up the majority of the population.
