= Yonibana =

- town
- Location in Sierra Leone
- Coordinates: 08°26′37″N 12°14′22″W
- Country: Sierra Leone
- Province: Northern Province
- District: Tonkolili District
- Time zone: UTC-5 (GMT)

Yonibana is a small rural town in Tonkolili District in the Northern Province of Sierra Leone. It is the centre of the Yoni Chiefdom The vast majority of its population are from the Temne ethnic group and small minority fula, the Temne language and krio language is widely spoken in the town. Yonibana lies approximately 28.2 miles (45.4 km) to the district capital Magburaka and approximately 90 miles north-east of Freetown.

The town is best known for being home to its dynamic poro society

Yonibana was connected to a branch line of the railroad in 1912.

The community is served by the Yonibana Secondary School, one of the oldest Secondary schools in Northern Sierra Leone, built in 1964.

Yonibana is the birthplace of Sierra Leone's minister of Health Haja Zainab Hawa Bangura; and Sierra Leone's former foreign minister from 2002 to 2007 Momodu Koroma.
