= Sierra Leone Police Corps =

The Sierra Leone Police Corps was established in 1829, by the colonial authorities of British West Africa (first period). Recruitment was primarily made from Sierra Leone Creole people.

The Corps was composed of 17 officers, 23 non-commissioned officers with 300 other ranks drawn from the Creole population and the Mende and Temne tribes.

== Military campaigns ==
Up until the creation of the Sierra Leone Frontier Police in 1890, the Sierra Leone Police Corps participated in several military expeditions:

- The Yoni Expedition 1887-8
