= Matotoka =

- Location in Sierra Leone
- Coordinates: 08°39′36″N 11°51′36″W
- Country: Sierra Leone
- Province: Northern Province
- District: Tonkolili District
- Time zone: UTC-5 (GMT)

Matotoka is a town in Tane Chiefdom, Tonkolili District in the Northern Province of Sierra Leone.

Matotoka lies approximately 165 miles east of Freetown, on the highway linking Makeni to Kono District, and marks the point where the highway deteriorates to a rough track for the last 74 miles to Koidutown-Sefadu. There are plans to improve this road with the help of a large grant from the African Development Bank. A loan has been signed for the work as far as Yiye (a waterway at 8° 31' 00" N; 11° 21' 00" W).
