= Magbass =

Magbass, Sierra Leone
- Location in Sierra Leone
- Coordinates: 08°43′01″N 11°56′36″W
- Country: Sierra Leone
- Province: Northern Province
- District: Tonkolili District
- Time zone: UTC-5 (GMT)

Magbass Is a farming town in Tonkolili District in the Northern Province of Sierra Leone. Magbass is located about 55 miles from Freetown. The town is home to the 1,280 hectare Magbass Sugar Complex, one of the largest sugar producing plantation in West Africa . The factory provides employment for a number of people within Tonkolili District and across Sierra Leone . The sugar complex was constructed between 1977 and 1982 by China's Complant as a turnkey project. Chinese management ran the complex from 1982 until 1996, when the Sierra Leone Civil War rendered operations impossible.
