= Fanatical Change Foundation =

American charity based in Houston, Texas

- Type: Private
- Industry: Charity
- Founded: 2008
- Founder: Steven Kaufman
- Headquarters: Houston, Texas, United States
- Services: Fundraising
- Website: fanaticalchange.org

The Fanatical Change Foundation is an American charity based in Houston, Texas. It was founded by businessman Steven Kaufman and Juan Cuevas in 2008 in response to Hurricane Ike. It was designed to allow donators to see who was receiving the donations, and collects donations by throwing lavish parties, where attendees can buy tickets and see videos of the families to whom they are donating. As of October 1, 2014, the Foundation has raised over $600,000 for 77 families, and has been sponsored and recognized for its philanthropic efforts. Kaufman also received recognition for creating it, receiving an award from the Houston Astros called the "Hometown Hero." Juan Cuevas was awarded 2015 Houston Humanitarian of the Year in 2015 by the Random Acts of Kindness Foundation for his work with Fanatical Change.

== History ==
The Fanatical Change Foundation first began as a charitable organization for families who have faced tragedies when it was founded by businessman Steven Kaufman in 2008 in response to the 2008 Hurricane Ike. Another reason cited for its creation by Kaufman was a desire to create a charity where donators could fully understand who was receiving the donations. He felt that it filled a niche that other charities typically didn't fill, which lead to the charity model the Fanatical Change Foundation uses today. He is currently the organization's President. As of October 1, 2014, the foundation has raised more than $600,000 for 77 different families in need in the Houston area. The Fanatical Change Foundation's website features multiple stories of people who went through tragedy and were helped by the organization. Some of the families helped by them include the family of Tony Blocker, who died after being pulled under by a rough surf, and the family of Markese Donahue, who was killed by a gun shot to the chest during a dispute. The Fanatical Change Foundation is a 501(c)3 charity, meaning that it is federally approved and a recognized charity under the Internal Revenue Service in the United States.

=== Fundraising events ===
Every year, the Fanatical Change Foundation hosts parties to raise money for needy families. In 2009, the organization hosted an event called "Keep the Change" where they gave money earned from the event to three families in need. It hosted a Halloween party called the "Hollywood Halloween: Cocktails & Costumes for a Change" in 2014. Attendees were able to view videos of the families who are receiving the donations. The event was hosted at the Diamond Club in Minute Maid Park. The event featured live music, costumes, cocktails, hors d'oeuvres, and auctions for attendants to enjoy.

== Recognition ==
The Fanatical Change Foundation has received attention and praise for its philanthropic efforts. Its events have been sponsored by a variety of different companies, including ServerMonkey, a provider of new and used IT hardware. The foundation's 2014 Halloween party was included in a list of the best Houston Halloween parties by the NU Home Source Realty company. It was recognized by Lifestyles Unlimited International for its "intimacy in charitable giving" due to its more direct approach to helping those in need. Steven Kaufman was given multiple awards for his work on his mortgage firm Zeus Mortgage and for his philanthropic work with the Fanatical Change Foundation. Particularly, he was included in the Houston Business Journal's "40 Under 40" list (which honors mortgage professionals under the age of 40) and by the Houston Astros as a "Hometown Hero" for his work with the Fanatical Change Foundation.
