= Frederick Richards =

Royal Navy Admiral of the Fleet (1833–1912)

Admiral of the Fleet Sir Frederick Richards GCB
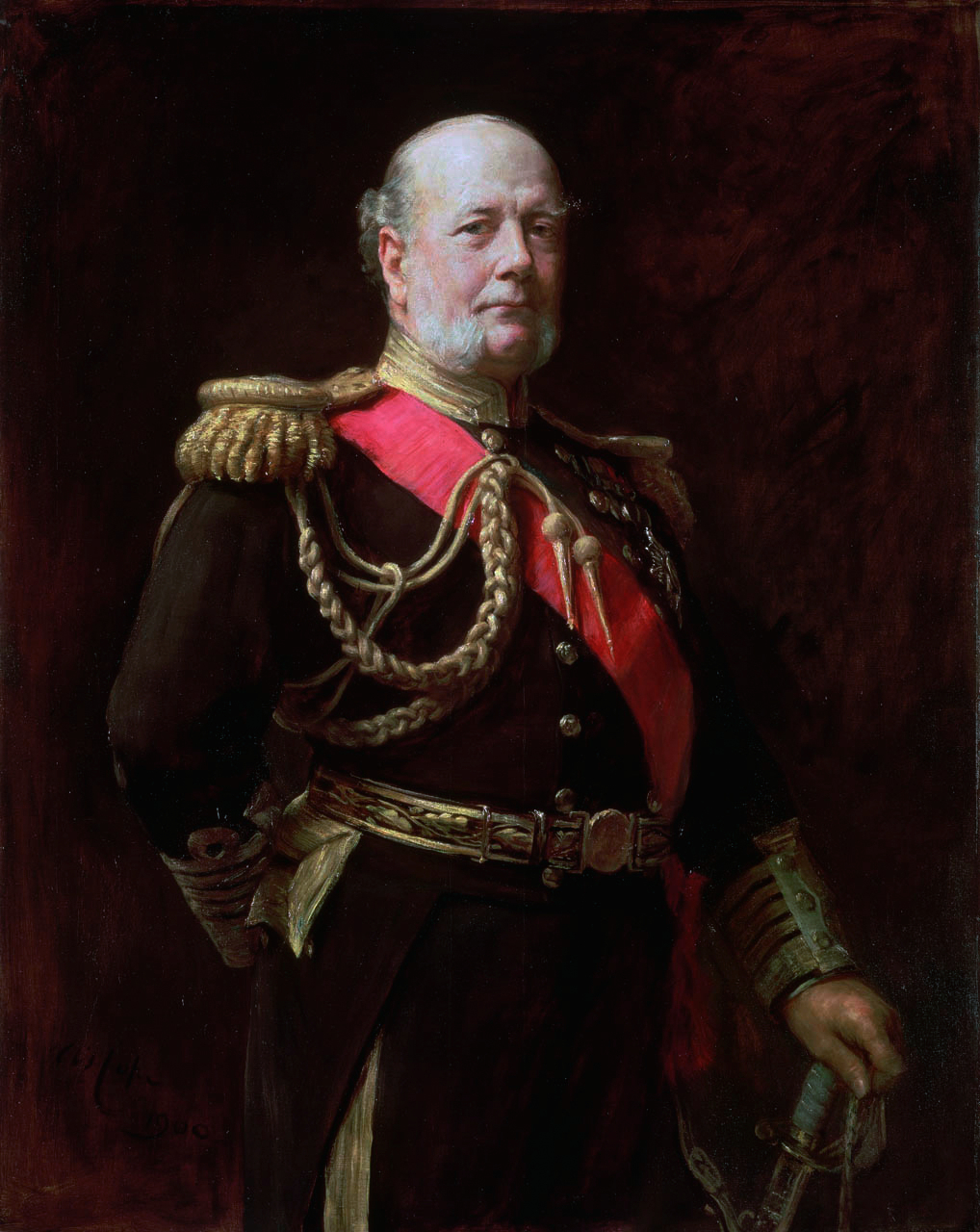
- Admiral Sir Frederick Richards
- Born: 30 November 1833; Ballyhally, County Wexford, Ireland, United Kingdom
- Died: 28 September 1912 (aged 78); Horton Court, Chipping Sodbury, Gloucestershire, England, United Kingdom
- Military career
- Allegiance: United Kingdom
- Branch: Royal Navy
- Service years: 1848–1899
- Rank: Admiral of the Fleet
- Commands: First Naval Lord; China Station; East Indies Station; Cape of Good Hope and West Coast of Africa Station; HMS Devastation; HMS Jumna; HMS Dart; HMS Vixen
- Conflicts: Second Opium War; Anglo–Zulu War; First Boer War; Third Anglo-Burmese War
- Awards: Knight Grand Cross of the Order of the Bath

Admiral of the Fleet Sir Frederick William Richards, GCB (30 November 1833 – 28 September 1912) was a Royal Navy officer. He commanded a paddle-sloop during the Second Opium War in 1860 and, as senior officer on the Cape of Good Hope and West Coast of Africa Station, he landed on the coast of South Africa with a small naval brigade which he led at the Battle of Gingindlovu and the Siege of Eshowe in April 1879 during the Anglo–Zulu War. He took part in the Battle of Laing's Nek in January 1881 during the First Boer War and, as Commander-in-Chief of the East Indies Station, he organized and equipped a naval brigade to support the British advance up the Irrawaddy River in November 1885 during the Third Anglo-Burmese War. He went on to be First Naval Lord and in that role led a huge shipbuilding and naval works programme undertaken in accordance with the provisions of the Naval Defence Act 1889. The programme was opposed by Prime Minister William Gladstone who was concerned about its vast cost and who resigned after a Cabinet defeat over it in March 1894. The programme continued under the Governments of Lord Rosebery and then Lord Salisbury and Richards remained in office driving the programme throughout the political turmoil.

== Early life ==
Born the second son of Captain Edwin Richards RN, of Solsboro, County Wexford and Mary Anne Richards (née Kirwan), daughter of the Revd Walter Blake Kirwan, dean of Killala, Richards was educated at the Royal Naval School, New Cross and entered the Royal Navy as a naval cadet in 1848. He was promoted to acting mate in the sloop HMS Fantome on the Australia Station on 8 January 1854. Promoted to lieutenant on 31 October 1855, he joined the second-rate HMS Ganges, flagship on the Pacific Station, in 1857. He became flag-lieutenant to the Commander-in-Chief, Pacific Station in April 1859 and was given command of the paddle-sloop HMS Vixen on the China Station during the Second Opium War in February 1860. He was given command of the gunboat HMS Dart in the West Africa Squadron in March 1862.

== Posting in Africa ==
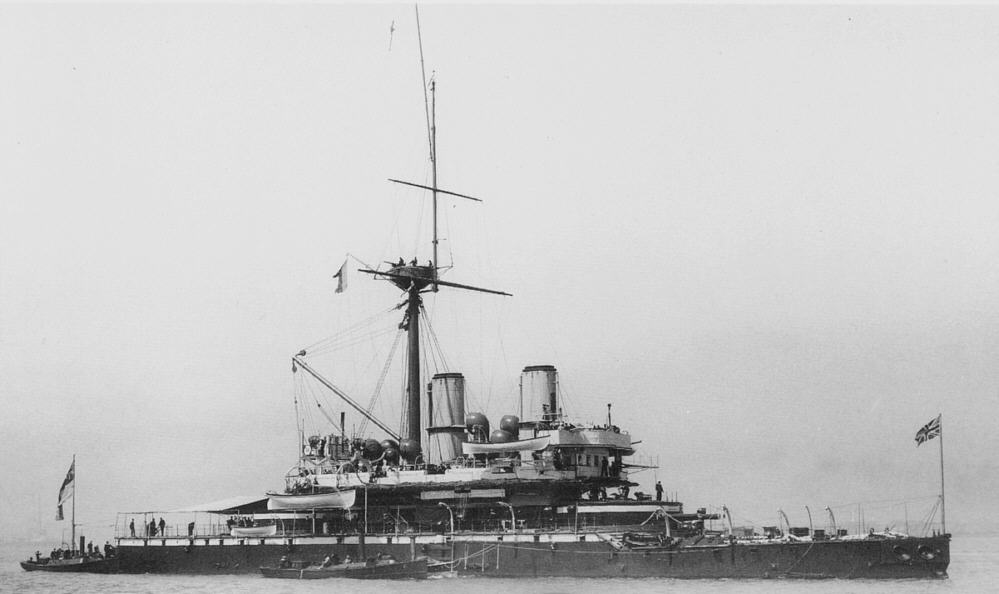
HMS Devastation, the first steam turret battleship without no sail power, which Richards commanded

Promoted to captain on 6 February 1866, Richards was given command of the Indian troopship HMS Jumna in 1870 and then took charge of HMS Devastation, the first steam turret battleship without no sail power, in June 1873. He took the Devastation to join the Mediterranean Fleet in 1874 and became Commodore and senior officer on the Cape of Good Hope and West Coast of Africa Station with his broad pendant in the corvette HMS Boadicea in October 1878. When he arrived at the Cape the Anglo–Zulu War was underway and the British defeat at the Battle of Isandlwana had just happened: Richards proceeded up the east coast of Africa and landed with a small naval brigade which he led at the Battle of Gingindlovu and the Siege of Eshowe in April 1879. He was appointed Naval Aide-de-Camp to the Queen on 15 June 1879 and a Companion of the Order of the Bath on 27 November 1879. He also took part in the Battle of Laing's Nek in January 1881 during the First Boer War and was advanced to Knight Commander of the Order of the Bath on 24 May 1881.

== China Station and the Admiralty ==
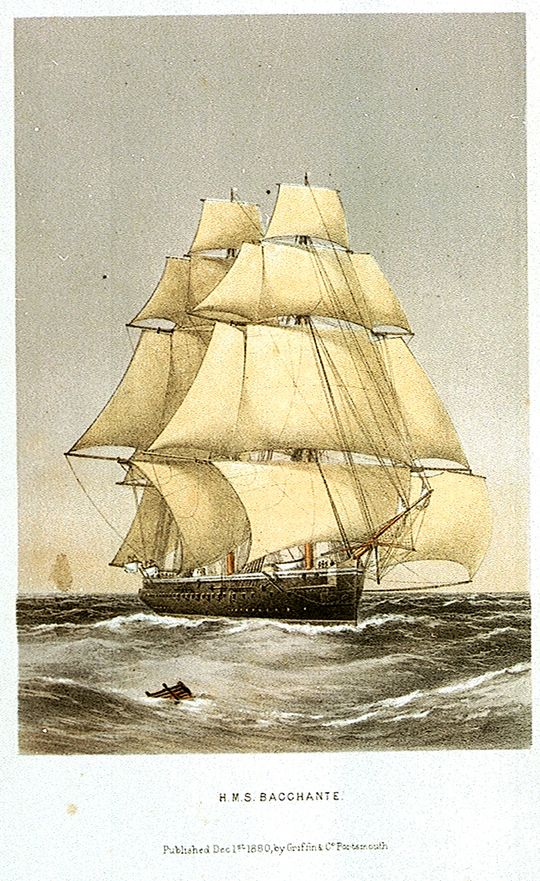
The corvette, HMS Bacchante, Richards' flagship as Commander-in-Chief of the East Indies Station

After promotion to rear-admiral on 9 June 1882, Richards was appointed Junior Naval Lord in July 1882 and then Commander-in-Chief of the East Indies Station, hoisting his flag in the corvette HMS Bacchante, in May 1885. In that role he organized and equipped a naval brigade to support the British advance up the Irrawaddy River in November 1885 during the Third Anglo-Burmese War. On his return to England in June 1888, together with two other admirals, he was asked to investigate the disposition of the ships of the Royal Navy many of which were unarmoured and together incapable of meeting the combined threat from any two of the other naval powers ("the Two-power Standard") and to prepare the report which ultimately led to the Naval Defence Act 1889. He was also a member of a Royal Commission formed to look into Naval and Military administration.

== First Naval Lord ==
Promoted to vice admiral on 25 October 1888, Richards became Commander-in-Chief, China Station in November 1890 and Second Naval Lord in June 1892. He was promoted to full admiral on 1 September 1893 and became First Naval Lord in November 1893. In that role Richards led a huge shipbuilding and naval works programme undertaken in accordance with the provisions of the Naval Defence Act 1889. The programme was opposed by Prime Minister William Gladstone who was concerned about its vast cost and who resigned after a Cabinet defeat over it in March 1894. The programme continued under the Government of Lord Rosebery and then under the Government of Lord Salisbury and Richards remained in office driving the programme throughout the political turmoil. He was advanced to Knight Grand Cross of the Order of the Bath in June 1895.

Richards also had to respond as First Naval Lord to the Far Eastern Crisis of 1897/98 when the Russian Pacific Fleet was threatening to attack the Korean port of Chemulpo to back up Russia’s demands for a peacetime coaling station at Deer Island. He was promoted to Admiral of the Fleet on 29 November 1898 and served as First Naval Lord until August 1899 when he retired. He died at his home, Horton Court at Chipping Sodbury in Gloucestershire, on 28 September 1912.

== Family ==
In 1866 Richards married Lucy Fayle, daughter of Fitzherbert Brooke, of Horton Court, Gloucestershire; they had no children.

== Sources ==
- Heathcote, Tony (2002). The British Admirals of the Fleet 1734 – 1995. Pen & Sword Ltd. ISBN 0-85052-835-6.

Military offices
Preceded by Sir Francis Sullivan	Commander-in-Chief, Cape of Good Hope Station; 1879–1882	Succeeded by Sir Nowell Salmon
Preceded by Sir Anthony Hoskins	Junior Naval Lord; 1882–1885	Succeeded by Sir William Hewett
Preceded by Sir William Hewett	Commander-in-Chief, East Indies Station; 1885–1888	Succeeded by Sir Edmund Fremantle
Preceded by Sir Nowell Salmon	Commander-in-Chief, China Station; 1890–1892	Succeeded by Sir Edmund Fremantle
Preceded by Sir Henry Fairfax	Second Naval Lord; 1892–1893	Succeeded by Lord Walter Kerr
Preceded by Sir Anthony Hoskins	First Naval Lord; 1893—1899	Succeeded by Lord Walter Kerr
