= Golden Dragon F.C. =

Golden Dragon
- Full name: Golden Dragon Football Club
- Nickname: The Dragons
- Ground: Magburaka Football Field; Magburaka, Sierra Leone
- League: Sierra Leone National Premier League
- 2009/2010: 13 out of 14 clubs
Home colours	Away colours

The Golden Dragon Football Club of Magburaka normally referred to as "Golden Dragon", is Sierra Leonean professional football club based in Magburaka, Sierra Leone. They currently play in the Sierra Leone National Premier League, the top football league in Sierra Leone after being promoted from the Nationwide First Division, the second highest football league in the country.

At the end of the 2009/10, Golden Dragon were relegated to the Sierra Leone National First Division.
