= Yoni Expedition =

The Yoni Expedition was British campaign launched in 1887 against the Yoni Chiefdom of the Temne people of Sierra Leone.

== Composition of expedition ==
The expedition was led by Francis de Winton and consisted of:

- 1st West India Regiment: 298 troops
- Sierra Leone Police Corps: 45 men
- HMS Acorn, HMS Icarus and HMS Rifleman: 38 naval personnel
- irregulars from friendly tribes: 400 men The British were supported by a force led by Sory Kessebeh from Bumpe, who had previously experienced attacks from the Temne.
- local porters to transport supplies: 500 men
- local bush-cutters to open up a track through the bush: 200
- government officials and military officers: 19 men

The seamen manned a 7-pounder rifled, muzzle-loading field gun and a Maxim machine gun. The West Indians were each armed with a Martini-Henry rifle and they also operated tubes firing rockets.
