= Koidu Girls Secondary School =

- Koidu Town, Sierra Leone

Information
- Type: Public School
- Religious affiliation: Roman Catholic
- Established: 1952
- Gender: Girls
- Age: 13 to 18

Koidu Girls Secondary School is a government-sponsored secondary school for girls located in Koidutown, Kono District, Sierra Leone. Koidu Girls Secondary School was founded in 1952 to educate the girls in Koidu Town. It is the most prominent girls secondary school in the Kono District and one of the most prominent in Sierra Leone.

== Notable alumni ==
- Saara Kuugongelwa, prime minister of Namibia
