= Yayah Jalloh =

Sierra Leonean footballer

Personal information
- Full name: Yahah Jalloh
- Date of birth: March 24, 1981 (age 45)
- Place of birth: Koidu Town, Sierra Leone
- Height: 5 ft 9 in (1.75 m)
- Position: Midfielder

Team information
- Current team: Mighty Blackpool

International career
Years	Team	Apps	(Gls)
2002–	Sierra Leone		

Yayah Jalloh (born February 20, 1981, in Koidu Town, Sierra Leone) is a Sierra Leonean international footballer is a midfielder and currently playing for East End Lions and for the Sierra Leone national football team.
