= Kono Model Academy =

Location
- Main massingbi Road, Koakoyima Town, Kono District. Koidu city, Koakoyima Town,, 224; Sierra Leone

Information
- Type: Public school (government funded)
- Motto: Forward ever ,Backward never.
- Religious affiliations: Methodist, Anglican
- Established: 1970
- Founder: Mr. Ngombu Gborie, Edward Tamba Titus Nyandebo, Tamba Robert Sumana.
- President: Mr. Tamba David Lansana(Board President).
- Current Principle: Mr. Ibrahim Sahid Koroma
- Mrs. Mary Bakie Jarrah ( Bushar): Sahr Alex Komba( Vice Principal)
- Staff: 28
- Gender: Girls ( 679) Boys ( 457)
- Age: 11 to 25
- Enrolment: 1,136
- Houses: Zambia , Guinea , Ethiopia , Sierra leone .
- Colours: Yellow,Pink, Blue,White
- Sciences Department ( Francis Tamba Bangai Bukuii. HTC(s),BeD) Business and Entrepreneurs ( John Jusu.BeD). Language Arts Department ( Francis Faya Lamin. HTC(s), BeD): Current Head of Departments.
- Website: www.modelschoolkono.sl.org

Kono Model Academy is a government-sponsored secondary school in Koidu town, Kono District, Sierra Leone. The school has produced some prominent people from Kono District.
