= The Chicago School =

Private university

Coordinates: 41.888302°N 87.633767°W

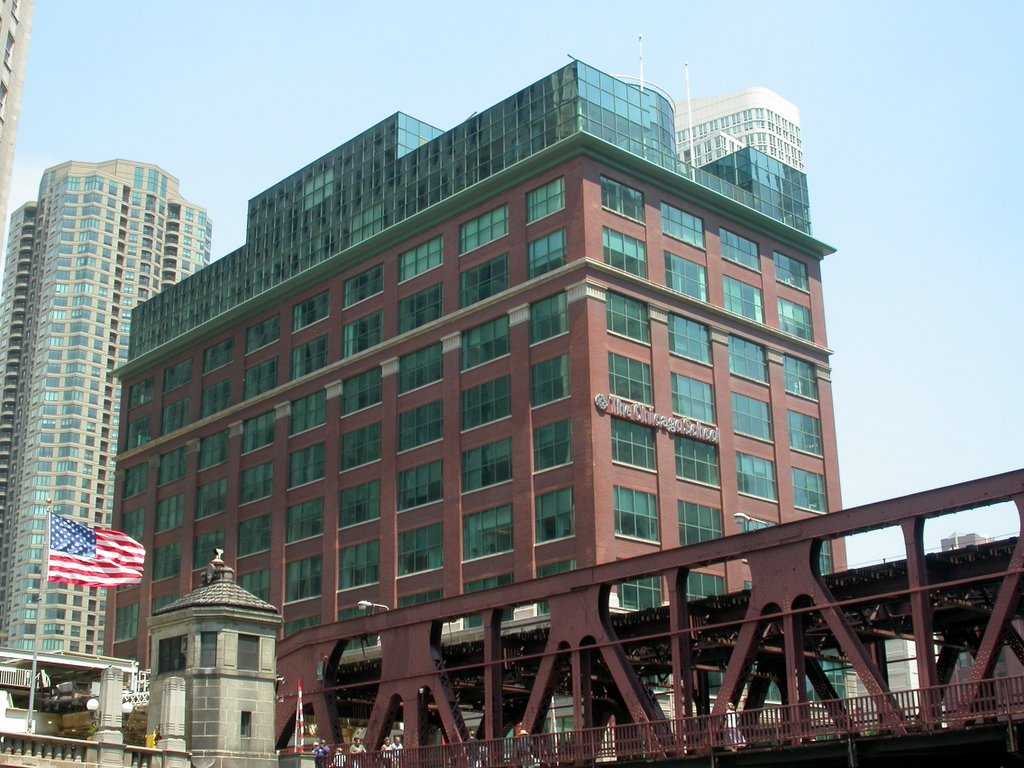
- Type: Private university
- Established: 1979; 47 years ago
- Accreditation: WSCUC
- President: Michele Nealon
- Students: 6,000 (Fall 2021)
- Location: Chicago, Illinois, United States
- Campus: Chicago, Illinois; Dallas, Texas; Los Angeles, California; Anaheim, California; Washington, D.C.
- Website: thechicagoschool.edu

The Chicago School is a private university with its main campus in Chicago, Illinois, United States. Established in 1979, The Chicago School was primarily focused on the professional application of psychology. It has about 6,000 students as of 2022 across all campuses and online. The university offers more than 30 academic programs in professional fields such as psychology, business, behavioral sciences, medicine, and counseling.

== History ==
The Chicago School was established in 1979. Initial plans for the school were made in 1977 and realized in January 1979 by the nonprofit Midwestern Psychology Development Foundation. The first classes were held in 1979 at 30 West Chicago Avenue, before moving in 1980 to the Fine Arts Building on Michigan Avenue. In 1986, it moved to Dearborn Station in Chicago's South Loop. In 2004, the school moved to a location on the Chicago River at 325 N. Wells Street.

The school expanded to the West Coast, adding three campuses in Southern California. The first out-of-state location was opened in downtown Los Angeles in the summer of 2008.

=== 2012 Los Angeles Campus lawsuit, settlement, and accreditation ===
In 2012, a group of 40 students who had enrolled in the inaugural 2008 clinical psychology doctoral cohort at the Los Angeles campus sued the school alleging that they were misled and deceived by the school into attending a doctoral program that was not accredited by the American Psychological Association (APA). Students stated that they were offered admission to the Los Angeles campus after applying to the APA-accredited Chicago campus doctoral program, while the school knowingly "downplayed" the fact that the Los Angeles campus had no clear path towards accreditation at the time that admission was offered. A group of 26 students subsequently filed a class-action lawsuit in 2014. In September 2016, the court found that students were not properly apprised as to the accreditation differences between the Chicago and the Los Angeles campus programs. The Chicago School settled the lawsuit for $11.2 million. The Los Angeles campus Clinical Psychology PsyD program obtained APA accreditation in 2018, two years after the fraud payout.

== Rankings ==
Based on a survey of academic programs, U.S. News & World Report ranked The Chicago School's Clinical Psychology program #206th of its 2025 ranking of graduate psychology programs and its Psychology program #244th of social science & humanities programs.

== Accreditation ==
All branches of the Chicago School are accredited by the WASC Senior College and University Commission (WSCUC). The School Psychology doctoral (Ed.S.) program in Chicago, Illinois, is approved by the Illinois State Board of Education. The Clinical Psychology doctoral (Psy.D.) program in Chicago, Illinois, is accredited by the American Psychological Association until 2023. The Clinical Psychology doctoral (Psy.D.) program in Washington, D.C., is accredited by the American Psychological Association until 2034. The Clinical Psychology doctoral (Psy.D.) program in Los Angeles, California, is accredited by the American Psychological Association until 2028. The Clinical Psychology doctoral (Psy.D.) program in Anaheim, California, is accredited by the American Psychological Association until 2031. The Clinical Psychology doctoral (Psy.D.) program at The Chicago School at Xavier University of Louisiana is accredited by the American Psychological Association until 2033. The Clinical Psychology doctoral (Psy.D.) program in Dallas, TX, is accredited, on contingency, by the American Psychological Association until 2027. The School Psychology doctoral (Psy.D.) program in Chicago, Illinois is accredited by the American Psychological Association until 2034.

The school is also an affiliate of the nonprofit The Community Solution Education System.

== Awards and Recognition ==
The Chicago School earned the 2026 Carnegie Elective Classification for Community Engagement, one of the highest national designations in higher education, honoring institutions where community impact is core to its mission.

== Campuses ==
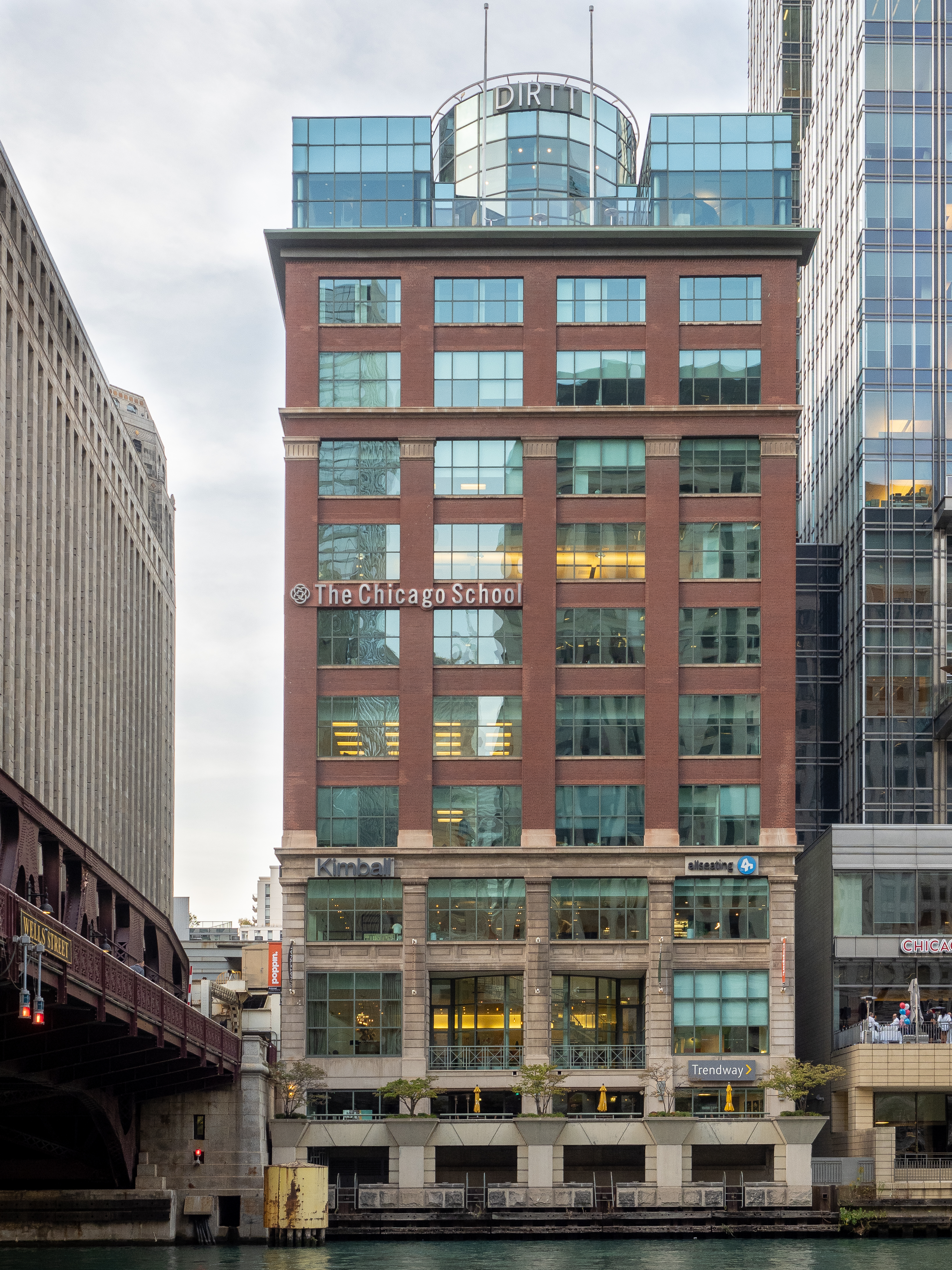
Downtown Chicago location

Each campus is equipped with event spaces, at least one classroom, and a library. Locations can be found in the following cities:

- Chicago: The original location of The Chicago School, since 2004, has been housed at 325 North Wells St, in Chicago's River North neighborhood. The building itself opened in 1914 as a Chase and Sanborn Coffee warehouse, a former industrial era building. In 2007, the school expanded across the street to additional space in the Merchandise Mart building.
- Washington, D.C.: This location opened in the summer of 2010, and was relocated in 2025 to 1101 K St NW, Washington, DC 20005.
- Dallas: Located at 6275 W. Plano Parkway Suite 130 Plano, Texas.
- Los Angeles: Located at 707 Wilshire Blvd., the L.A. Campus occupies space in the Aon Center.
- Anaheim: Located in Suite 1200 at 2400 E. Katella Ave in Anaheim.

== The Community Solution Education System ==
In 2009, The Chicago School created the non-profit university system The Community Solution Education System (originally named TCS Education System). In subsequent years, several institutions joined The Community Solution in addition to The Chicago School itself:

- Pacific Oaks College
- Pacific Oaks Children's School
- The Colleges of Law
- Saybrook University
- Kansas Health Science Center–Kansas College of Osteopathic Medicine
- University of Western States
- Dallas Nursing Institute (subsequently closed)
- Santa Barbara Graduate Institute (subsequently closed)

== Illinois College of Osteopathic Medicine (IllinoisCOM) ==
In 2025, The Chicago School launched the proposed Illinois College of Osteopathic Medicine with pre-accreditation approval from the American Osteopathic Association’s Commission on Osteopathic College Accreditation (COCA) and is set to start enrolling students in fall 2026.

== Alumni ==
- Anjhula Mya Bais, psychologist, trauma specialist, human rights activist, and model
- David Castain, entrepreneur and philanthropist
- Patric Gagne, writer, former therapist, and expert on sociopathy
- Steven Kaufman, entrepreneur and philanthropist
- Alicia Kozakiewicz, television personality, motivational speaker, and Internet safety and missing persons advocate
- James P. Liautaud, American industrialist, inventor, and business theorist.
- Mohamed Kamarainba Mansaray, Sierra Leonean politician, psychologist, and leader and chairman of the Alliance Democratic Party
- Maurice West, member of the Illinois House of Representatives for the 67th district
