= John Wilson (Royal Navy officer) =

Royal Navy admiral (1834-1885)

Rear-Admiral John Wilson
- Born: 1834
- Died: 4 July 1885 (aged 50–51)
- Allegiance: United Kingdom
- Branch: Royal Navy
- Rank: Rear-Admiral
- Commands: HMS Narcissus; HMS Impregnable; HMS Thunderer; HMS Wolverine; Australia Station (1878–1882)
- Spouses: Mary Gore Georgina Emma Blackett (m. 1871)

Rear-Admiral John Crawford Wilson (1834 – 4 July 1885) was a Royal Navy officer who was appointed Commodore in command of the Australia Station.

== Early life ==
Wilson was born in 1834 to James Wilson, Chief Justice of Mauritius, and Margaret Crawford. He was the 10th of 12 children.

== Naval career ==
Wilson was appointed a lieutenant in the Royal Navy in 1855. Promoted to captain in 1865, he was given command of HMS Narcissus, HMS Impregnable, HMS Thunderer and HMS Wolverine. He was appointed Commodore in command of the Australia Station in 1878.

In 1879, in response to the murders of island traders, Wilson led a punitive expedition on HMS Wolverine against natives in the New Hebrides and Solomon Islands. Wilson also personally led a raid on Brooker Island which had been the site of a number of instances of cannibalism.

He was promoted to the rank of rear admiral in 1881 at the conclusion of his term in Australia.

== Family ==
Wilson's first marriage was to Mary Gore. He married again in 1871, this time to Georgina Emma Blackett. They had two children, Julia (b. 1872) and Alexander (b. 1876).

== Death ==
Wilson died on 4 July 1885. The programmed launch on 11 July of the steam gunvessel Icarus was delayed to 27 July 1885 to allow his daughter, Julia, to conduct the ceremony.

Military offices
Preceded by Anthony Hoskins	Commander-in-Chief, Australia Station; 1878–1882	Succeeded by James Erskine
