= Koidu Secondary School =

- Koidu City, Sierra Leone

Information
- Type: Public school
- Motto: Christus Via Veritas Vita
- Religious affiliation: United Methodist (Christian)
- Established: 1965
- Founder: Terry C. Batlam
- Gender: Co-educational(Boys and Girls)
- Age: 13 to 18

Koidu Secondary School is a government-sponsored secondary school located in Koidu City, Kono District, Sierra Leone. The school is the largest and most prominent secondary school in Kono District and one of the largest in the country. The current principal is Kai Jimmy.

== Notable alumni ==
Some of Sierra Leone's most gifted students have come from the Koidu Secondary School.

- Samuel Sam-Sumana, vice President of Sierra Leone
- Komba Mondeh, retired colonel, Sierra Leone Army
- Samuel Komba Kambo, retired captain, Sierra Leone Army
- Komba Yomba, footballer
