= Ibrahim Ben Kargbo =

Sierra Leonean journalist and politician

Alhaji Ibrahim Ben Kargbo

Sierra Leone Minister of Information and Communication
- Incumbent
- Assumed office 14 October 2007
- Preceded by: Septimus Kaikai

Sierra Leone Government Spokesman
- Incumbent
- Assumed office 17 September 2007
- Preceded by: Alhaji Kanji Daramy

Personal details
- Born: October 18, 1944 (age 81) Makeni, Bombali District, British Sierra Leone
- Party: All People's Congress (APC)
- Education: Fourah Bay College
- Profession: Journalist

Alhaji Ibrahim Ben Kargbo (born October 18, 1944), commonly known as I.B. Kargbo, is a Sierra Leonean journalist and politician. He currently the MP of constituency 030(Bombali District) Ernest Bai Koroma. I.B Kargbo is a close personal friend of president Ernest Bai Koroma and former president Ahmad Tejan Kabbah. I.B. Kargbo is one of the most trusted aides to president Koroma. He has a Bachelor's degree in journalism from Fourah Bay College and a Diploma in Journalism from John New Homes School of Journalism, 1979.

I.B. Kargbo is the owner of one of Sierra Leone's most read newspapers, The New Citizen. Until his appointment as Minister, he was a regular columnist in his own newspaper. As a journalist, he publicly opposed the Public Order Act of 1965.

== Early life and education ==
Alhaji Ibrahim Ben Kargbo was born on October 18, 1944, in Makeni, Bombali District in the Northern Province of Sierra Leone. He is a member of the Madingo ethnic group and he is a descendant of Port Loko Baker Loko Chiefdom, Port Loko District in Northern Sierra Leone. I.B. Kargbo attended St. Andrew's Secondary School in Bo.

He graduated from Fourah Bay College in 1969 with a Bachelor's degree in journalism. He also has a Diploma in Journalism from John New Homes School of Journalism in 1979.
