= Mines and Minerals Act (Sierra Leone) =

The Mines and Minerals Act is a law passed in 1994 in Sierra Leone. It imposed a minimum sentence of 3 years on anyone illegally possessing or smuggling minerals, specifically diamonds as well as authorization to payment to informants up to 40% of the value of the minerals being smuggled.
