= Komba Yomba =

Sierra Leonean footballer

Personal information
- Full name: Komba Tawa Yomba
- Date of birth: 24 August 1976 (age 50)
- Place of birth: Yengema, Sierra Leone
- Height: 1.90 m (6 ft 3 in)
- Position: Goalkeeper

Senior career*
Years	Team	Apps	(Gls)
–2008	Diamond Stars		

International career
1997–2001	Sierra Leone	7	(0)
- * Club domestic league appearances and goals

Komba Tawa Yomba (born 24 August 1976) is a Sierra Leonean former footballer who played as a goalkeeper. He captained the Diamond Stars in the Sierra Leone National Premier League and was the first-choice goalkeeper for Sierra Leone during qualification for the 2002 FIFA World Cup.
