= Bumbuna =

- Location in Sierra Leone
- Coordinates: 9°3′N 11°44′W
- Country: Sierra Leone
- Province: Northern Province
- District: Tonkolili District

Population
  - Total: 4,051
- Time zone: UTC-5 (GMT)

Bumbuna is a town in the central of Tonkolili District in the Northern Province of Sierra Leone. The town lies about 30 miles from the district capital of Magburaka and approximately 124 miles (by road) northeast of Freetown.

The areas in and around Bumbuna is extremely rich in iron ore and is home to Bumbuna Dam, the largest hydroelectric power station in the country. The population of Bumbuna was 4,051 in the 2004 census, and is made up of many different ethnic groups. Such as the Limba, Temne, Mandingo, Loko etc. However the Limba constitutes the largest population in Bumbuna.

== Industry and minerals ==
Several industrial mining companies are based in the Bumbuna area, the largest of which is the Chinese Owned Shandong Steel SL limited,(SD Steel): this company took over the asset of the defunct African Minerals Ltd (AML) . The 50 MegaWatts Sierra Leone Bumbuna hydroelectric power plant, near Bumbuna, is complete and is supplying reliable, effective and environmentally sustainable electricity across Sierra Leone especially to the capital Freetown and Makeni . However, the national grid is so dilapidated that only about 27 MegaWatts are actually used. In 2010 about 5 million people were still not on the grid.

== Statistics ==
- elevation – 221 metres (725 ft)

== See also ==
- Tonkolili District
