= Koidu Limited =

- Company type: Private company
- Industry: Diamond mining
- Founded: 2003
- Headquarters: Freetown, Sierra Leone
- Key people: Ibrahim Turay
- Products: Diamonds
- Number of employees: 1,300 permanent employees
- Subsidiaries: None
- Website: www.koidulimited.com

Koidu Limited a subsidiary of OCTÉA Limited, is a locally registered Company in the Republic of Sierra Leone.

== History ==
=== Formation ===
After a JV was formed on June 1, 2002, Koidu Limited acquired the remainder of the 20 -year mining lease agreement originally signed in 1995. After the second successful post-war democratic election in 2007, the Government of Sierra Leone undertook to review all mining agreements in the country.

The Mining Review Process commenced in July 2008 and Koidu Limited’s mining lease for the Koidu Kimberlite Project was one of the first to be reviewed. A new mining lease agreement was entered into between the Republic of Sierra Leone and Koidu Limited on 6 September 2010. The term of the mining lease was extended to 22 July 2030 and may be renewed for a further period of 15 years.

=== Initial Operations ===
After the end of the civil war in Sierra Leone in 2002 – and once the country had joined as a participant of the Kimberley Process Certification Scheme in 2003 – Koidu Limited was the first commercial diamond mining company to invest in the development of the resource sector in Sierra Leone, focusing initially on the kimberlite deposits at Koidu.

=== Corporate Identity ===

After the end of the civil war in the Republic of Sierra Leone in 2002 and once the country had joined as a participant of the Kimberly Process Certification Scheme in 2003, Koidu Limited was formed in 2003 and was the first commercial diamond mining company to invest in the development of the resource sector in the Republic of Sierra Leone, focusing initially on the kimberlite deposits at Koidu.

== Mining Leases ==
Koidu Limited holds one mining leases in Sierra Leone: the Koidu Kimberlite Project (KKP).

=== Koidu Kimberlite Project (KKP) ===
The Koidu Kimberlite Project mining lease, located within the Tankoro Chiefdom of the Kono District, measures approximately 4.9 km^{2} and hosts two small kimberlite pipes, No. 1 Pipe (K1) and No. 2 Pipe (K2), and four kimberlite dyke zones, along which four small blows or enlargements have been discovered.

== Exploration and mining operations ==
=== Koidu Kimberlite Project (KKP) ===
Development of the mine commenced in 2003, with the construction of a 50 tonne per hour dense media separation (DMS) plant and mining infrastructure required for bulk sampling and trial mining of K1 and K2. Processing of the first kimberlite from K1 began in January 2004 and continued until mid-2004, when sampling switched to K2 to allow for waste stripping and establishment of the headgear, hoist, winder and associated infrastructure at the collar of the planned vertical pit at K1.

From August 2005 to December 2007, the mine focused exclusively on extracting ore from the K1 pit, establishing the largest and deepest excavation of its kind world-wide while attempting to minimize the impact on the nearby Koidu community.

Given the limited lifespan of the vertical pit (maximum 80 m from collar), the company embarked on an exploration core drilling programme to delineate sufficient resources for at least the remaining life of the mining lease period. From 2003 to 2008, four phases of core drilling were completed; once the magnitude of potentially mineable resources began to emerge, desktop studies considering the possible scenarios for the future expansion of the mining operation were undertaken.

When the full extent of the diamond resources at Koidu was understood towards the end of 2008, the company entered the prefeasibility study stage, contracting industry leaders in resource estimation, geohydrology, mine design and various other disciplines to ultimately bring the project to a bankable feasibility study level.

After significant additional bulk sampling exercises in 2009 and 2010 (both from large-scale surface excavations and large-diameter drilling programmes on K2, Dyke Zones A and B, as well as the four blows intended to form part of the life-of-mine plan), the resource statement was signed off by diamond specialists Mineral Services Canada in their capacity as independent competent persons. Indicated resources from K1, K2 and Blow B3 amount to 4.2 million tonnes at an average grade of 0.45 ct/t. Inferred resources from K1, K2, Blow A, Blow B1, dyke Zone A and B amount to 10.12 million tonnes at an average grade of 0.54 ct/t.

The feasibility study demonstrated that the optimal project plan for the expansion of operations at Koidu was technically and economically viable. The plan includes mining both kimberlite pipes by open pit methods, to a depth of approximately 310 m below surface for K1 (March 2011 to September 2016) and approximately 244 m below surface for K2 (from September 2010 to October 2015), at which time the transition to underground mining methods would be made. Taking into account the additional production that could be derived by mining the kimberlite dykes and blows from underground, an optimal plant size of 180 tph has been selected, mining at a rate of 100,000 tonnes of ore per month and 1.4 million tonnes of waste per month.

The mine will continue producing with the existing 50 tonne per hour plant until the new plant is erected, commissioned and has ramped up to full production (by the end of June 2012).

The five-year open pit mining phase of the operation (to the end of 2015) will be followed by underground mining of both kimberlite pipes, as well as the dyke zones and blows, for the remainder of the life of the mine. Construction of the underground access will begin early in 2012 with first ore being extracted from underground in 2016.

The project is expected to increase production from the two open pits from about 10,000 carats per month currently to an average of 45,000 carats per month from 2012 to 2015, tapering off as production from underground comes on line and the operation is maintained at 100,000 tonnes processed per month.
