= K-Man =

- Born: Mohamed James
- Origin: Koidu Town, Kono District, Sierra Leone
- Genres: RnB singer and songwriter
- Occupations: singer and songwriter
- Years active: 2004– present
- Label: Studio J Music (previous)

Mohamed Saccoh (born in Koidu Town, Sierra Leone), better known by his stage name K-Man, is a Sierra Leonean rapper. K-Man is known for his soft rap tone. He rapped mainly in English and the Krio language as well as occasionally in the Maninka language.

== Early life ==
Mohamed Saccoh was born in Koidu Town, Kono District in Eastern Sierra Leone to Mandingo parents. K-Man attended primary school in Koidu Town, Kono District. He and his family left Kono District and moved to Freetown, the country's capital city, during early stage of the Sierra Leone Civil War.

K-Man started his music career while attending the Ahmmaddiya Muslim Secondary School in Freetown. His passion for music, in particular Hip Hop, R&B and reggae forms the single most important driving force in his life. From then he rose to an incredibly high standard in the growing post civil war music industry of Sierra Leone while still in Secondary School.

== Music career ==
In 2004, K-Man, along with fellow Sierra Leonean youth Underground rappers C-Jay and Camouflag, formed the Freetown based Hip Hop group called Conscious Knowledge, more commonly known as CK. The group released their debut hit single called 'Africa' in the paradise compilation volume 1. K-Man's soon after came to be recognized and he quickly rose as the most prominent member of the group.

K-Man left Freetown for neighboring Conakry, Guinea to develop his music career. While in Guinea, K-Man worked with several prominent Guinean rappers including Bill De Sam and Sierra Leonean-Guinean reggae musician Daddi Cool.

With enough time at his disposal, K-Man decided to go solo. This would mean doing all eight tracks in his debut album "watch u back" alone. Songs like Bombat and Watch your back became hits in Sierra Leone, Guinea and The Gambia.

His second album "Leh Wi Make Salone" (let's build Sierra Leone) was internationally successful in West Africa and within the Sierra Leone community abroad.
