= Yoni Chiefdom =

Chiefdom of Sierra Leone

The Yoni Chiefdom is a Chiefdom of Sierra Leone located in Tonkolili District, Northern Province, Sierra Leone. It is centered on Yonibana and the Yoni people are part of the Temne and Fula ethnic groups.

== British invasion of 1887 ==
Francis de Winton led the British Yoni Expedition against the Yoni Chiefdom following a number of disputes with the British allies in the area.
