= Diamond Stars F.C. =

Sierra Leonean football club

Diamond Stars
- Full name: Diamond Stars Football Club of Kono
- Nickname: Diamond Stars
- Founded: 1954; 72 years ago
- Ground: Koidu Sports Stadium; Koidu Town, Kono District, Sierra Leone
- Capacity: 2,000
- Chairman: (Sierra Leone) PC Lappia Yopoi
- Manager: (Sierra Leone) Sia Nyukeh
- League: Sierra Leone National Premier League
- 2025–2026: 15th
Home colours	Away colours

The Diamond Stars Football Club is a Sierra Leonean professional football club based in Koidu Town, Kono District, Sierra Leone. The club represent the diamond-rich Kono District and is a member of the Sierra Leone National Premier League, the top football league in Sierra Leone. The club is coached by a Class A Coach ZAPA.

== History ==
The club got the name the Diamond Stars due to the rich diamond reserves in Kono district, where it is based. Diamond stars have one of the largest fan bases among Sierra Leonean football clubs and its supporters are primarily from Kono District. The club is owned a\ by the KonoDistrict Stakeholders, but was previously sponsored by the Koidu Holdings, diamond mining company, through their corporate social responsibility. However, the company stopped funding the Club in 2014.

The Diamond Stars became the champions of the 2012 and 2013 Premier League season, and the first club outside Freetown to ever won the Premier League. They won their first league title at the Wusum Sports Stadium in front of a capacity crowd of 5,000.

The club current coach is a Class A Coah ZAPA.

The club have won the Sierra Leonean FA Cup once, in 1992 and they are one of the most popular football clubs in Sierra Leone.

In October 2018, the Board of Trustees of the Diamond Stars Football Club appointed a new executive, chaired by PC George Bockrie Torto as Team Chairman and Mr. Adams Tommy as Team Manager. Other executive members include: Mark Yambasu (deputy chairman, Sahr Amadu Komba (Deputy Team Manager); Sahr Ezra Kellie (Team Secretary); Munya Kanneh (Welfare Officer); Tamba Senessie (PRO1); Berns Komba Lebbie (PRO2); Tamba Sylvanus Morsay (Organizing Secretary)

== Stadium ==
Koidu-Sefadu Sports Stadium is the home ground of the Diamond Stars. It is a multi-use 2,000 capacity soccer stadium located in Koidu Town, Kono District, Sierra Leone.

== Achievements ==
- Sierra Leone League
  - Champions (2): 2012, 2013
- Sierra Leonean FA Cup
  - Winners (2): 1992, 2012

== Performance in CAF competitions ==
- CAF Cup: 1 appearance

1994 – withdrew in Quarter-Finals

- CAF Cup Winners' Cup: 2 appearances

1989 – First Round
1993 – Preliminary Round
