= Tonkolili District =

- Location of Tonkolili District in Sierra Leone
- Coordinates: 8°40′N 11°40′W
- Country: Sierra Leone
- Province: Northern Province
- Capital: Magburaka
- Largest city: Magburaka

Government
  - Type: District Council
  - District Council Chairwoman: Yabom Sesay (APC)
  - Deputy District Council Chairman: Foday Kanu (APC)

Area
  - Total: 7,003 km^{2} (2,704 sq mi)

Population (2015 census)
  - Total: 530,776
  - Density: 75.79/km^{2} (196.3/sq mi)
- Time zone: UTC-5 (Greenwich Mean Time)
- HDI (2017): 0.384 low · 10th

Tonkolili District is a district in the Northern Province of Sierra Leone. Its capital and largest city is Magburaka. The other major towns include Masingbi, Yele, Mile 91, Bumbuna, Yonibana, Matotoka. Mathora, Magbass and Masanga. Tonkolili District is home to the largest sugar factory in Sierra Leone, and one of the largest sugar factories in West Africa, that is located in the town of Magbass. Tonkolili District had a population of 530,776. The district occupies a total area of 7,003 km^{2} (2,704 sq mi) and comprises eleven chiefdoms.

Tonkolili District borders Bombali District to the northwest, Kono District to the east, Kenema District and Bo District to the southeast, Port Loko and Koinadugu Districts. Tonkolili is strategically located in the center of Sierra Leone. The district is criss crossed by many rivers including the Pampana River and Sierra Leone's longest river, the Rokel.

The Temne people make up the overwhelming majority of the population of Tonkolili District. The vast majority of the population of Tonkolili District are Muslims.

== Demographics ==
The population is mostly Muslim and the people are largely from the Temne ethnic group.

Religion in Tonkolili District (2015)
Religion	Percent(%)
Islam	84.9%
Christianity	14.0%
Baháʼí Faith	0.0%
Traditional African religion	0.1%
Other	0.5%
No religion	0.4%

.

== Economy ==
Economically, there is significant potential for an extractive economy, specifically the mining of iron ore, bauxite gold and to a lesser extent diamonds. Today the biggest iron ore deposit in Africa and the third largest in the world, African Minerals Tonkolili Project, are found in the hills around Bumbuna, Mabonto and Bendugu. Agriculture also plays a significant role in the economy, the biggest bio energy company in Africa, Addax Petroleum, operates mostly in Mar in constituency 60. There is also a significant agricultural activity at the Magbass sugar production facility and refinery run by Complant, a Chinese construction engineering firm. A rubber factory is about to be established in the Mile 91 area. There are several hydroelectric power systems in the district, especially at Bumbuna. There is also as game reserve at Mamunta. However, economic development was hindered by the destruction of facilities during the 1991-2002 civil war.

== Education ==
Before the civil war, education was highly esteemed, especially in Arabic and English. Since the end of the conflict, schools have been rebuilt to a large extent and even new ones created, including an Arabic college. As of 2004, the district was home to 310 primary schools which had nearly 74,000 students. It was also home to 15 secondary schools.

== Government ==
Tonkolili District currently has nine Representatives in the Sierra Leonean Parliament, of which eight members were elected for a 5-year term.

== Administrative divisions ==
=== Chiefdoms ===
==== Pre-2017 ====
Prior to the 2017 local administrative reorganization, Tonkolili District was made up of eleven chiefdoms as the third level of administrative subdivision, with their administrative centres in parentheses listed below:

1. Gbonkolenken – Yele
2. Kafe Simiria – Mabonto
3. Kalansongoia – Bumbuna
4. Kholifa Mabang – Mabang
5. Kholifa Rowalla – Magburaka
6. Kunike – Masingbi
7. Kunike Barina – Makali
8. Malal Mara – Rochin
9. Sambaia – Bendugu
10. Tane – Matotoka
11. Yoni – Yonibana

==== Post-2017 ====
After the 2017 local administrative reorganization, Tonkolili District has made up of nineteen chiefdoms as the third level of administrative subdivision.

1. Dansogoia (Note: Formerly part of Kalansongoia Chiefdom; split off.) – Bumbuna
2. Gbonkolenken Masankong – Yele
3. Kafe (Note: Formerly part of Nieni Chiefdom.) – ?
4. Kalanthuba – ?
5. Kholifa Mabang – Mabang
6. Kholifa Mamuntha Mayosso (Note: Formerly part of Kholifa Rowalla Chiefdom.) – ?
7. Kholifa Rowalla – Magburaka
8. Kunike Barina – Makali
9. Kunike Folawusu (Note: Formerly part of Kunike Sanda Chiefdom.) – ?
10. Kunike Sanda – Masingbi
11. Malal (Note: Formerly part of Malal Mara Chiefdom before losing the Mara section.) – Rochin
12. Mayeppoh (Note: Formerly part of Gbonkolenken Chiefdom) – ?
13. Poli – ?
14. Sambaia – Bendugu
15. Simiria – Mabonto
16. Tane – Matotoka
17. Yele – ?
18. Yoni Mabanta (Note: Formerly part of Yoni Chiefdom; split off.) – ?
19. Yoni Mamaila – Yonibana

== Mining ==
Tonkolili is the site of new iron ore mine, including a 3 ft 6 in (1,067 mm) railway between the mine and Port Pepel. This railway to Port Pepel with an extension to deeper waters at Tagrin Point would be about 200 km long. While built by the African Minerals company, the railway would be open access to other users at commercial rates. There is also a large deposit at Kasafoni.
