= Magburaka =

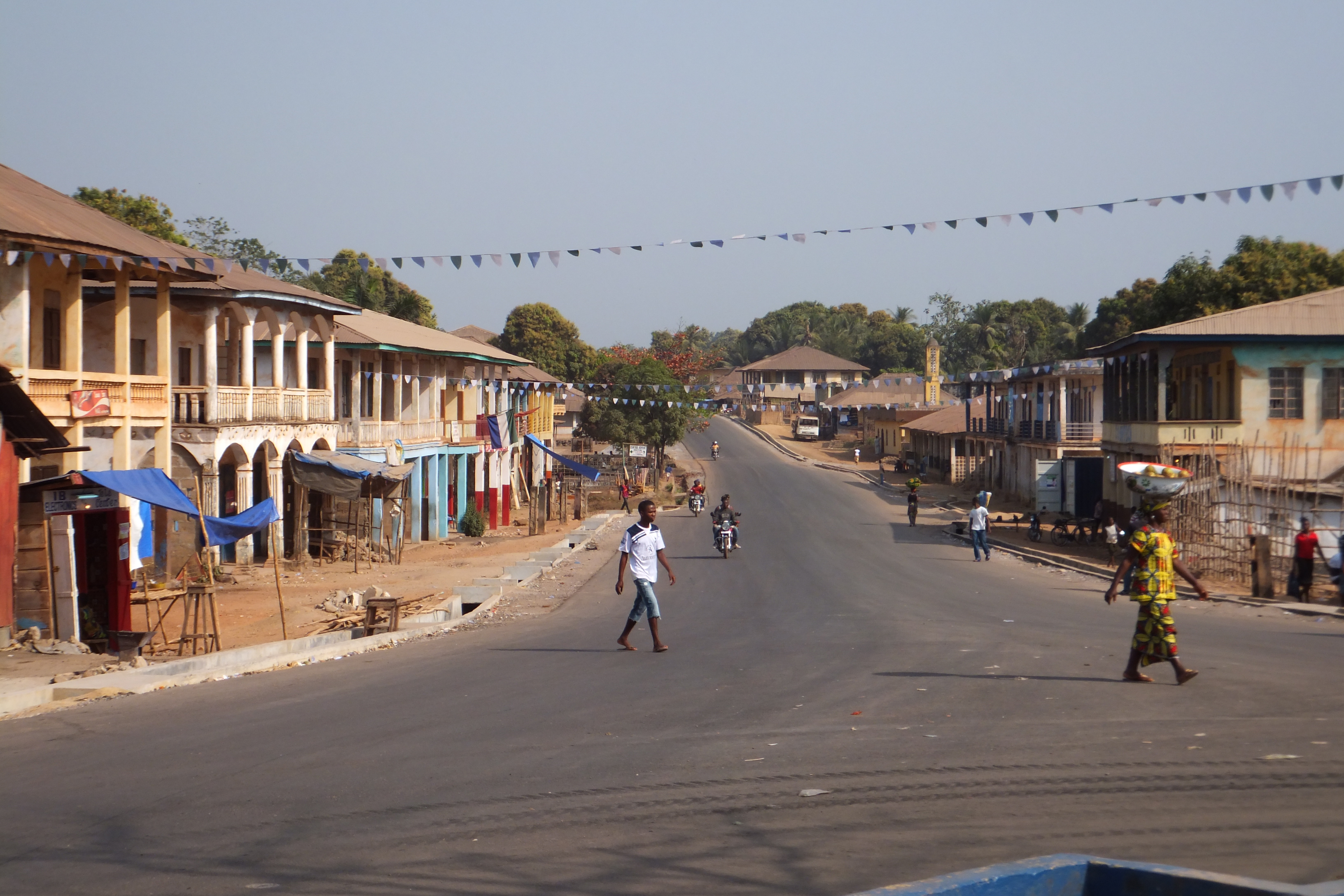

- Location in Sierra Leone
- Coordinates: 08°43′01″N 11°56′36″W
- Country: Sierra Leone
- Province: Northern Province
- District: Tonkolili District
- Chiefdom: Kholifa Rowalla Chiefdom

Population (2010)
  - Total: 40,313
- Time zone: UTC-5 (GMT)

Magburaka is the capital and largest city of Tonkolili District in the Northern Province of Sierra Leone. Its population was 16,313 in the 2004 census. and a current estimate of 40,313. It is located at around 8°43′1″N 11°56′36″W, along the Rokel River. Magburaka lies just about 26 miles (42 km) drive south-west of Makeni, the economic centre of Northern Sierra Leone and about 80 miles (135 km) drive east of the country's capital Freetown. Magburaka is a trade centre and is one of the main cities in Northern Sierra Leone. As with most parts of Sierra Leone, the Krio language of the Sierra Leone Creole people is the most widely spoken language in Magburaka.

Magburaka is an educational centre and is home to the Magburaka Government Secondary School for Boys, the first western standard Secondary school built in Northern Sierra Leone. The school is one of the elite secondary schools in Sierra Leone and is well known for producing some of the most gifted students in the country. Sierra Leone's former president Ernest Bai Koroma is a graduate of the Government Secondary School for Boys. The city is home to the Magburaka Technical Institute, a two-year technical college and a university which is known as Ernest Bai Koroma University of Science and Technology.

The Golden Dragon F.C., which is based in Magburaka, represent the city in the Sierra Leone National Premier League, the top football league in the country.

== Government ==
The city along with the entire Tonkolili District is a stronghold of the APC.

== Education ==
Magburaka is the educational centre of Northern Sierra Leone. The city is home to the Magburaka Government Secondary School for Boys, the first Secondary school built in Northern Sierra Leone; the school is one of the elite secondary schools in Sierra Leone and is well known for producing some of the most gifted students in the country. The city is also home to the first Girls Secondary School in the North, Mathora.

== Sport ==
Like the rest of Sierra Leone, football is the most popular sport in Magburaka. The major football club that represent the city and the entire Tonkolili District is the Golden Dragon F.C., which is currently playing in the Sierra Leone National Premier League, the top football league in the country.

== Notable people from Magburaka ==
- Minkailu Bah, Sierra Leone's minister of Education, Youth and Sports
