= List of first ladies of Sierra Leone =

First Lady of Sierra Leone
- Incumbent; Fatima Bio since April 4, 2018
- Style: Lady Jabbe Maada Bio
- Residence: State Lodge
- Inaugural holder: Rebecca Stevens
- Website: firstladysl.org

The First Lady of Sierra Leone is the spouse of the President of Sierra Leone. Though it is not an elected position, the First Lady is a representative of Sierra Leone at home and abroad. The Office of the First Lady is an extension of State House and is responsible for social events and ceremonies at State Lodge.

Five women have held the office of First Lady since Sierra Leone the office was formed in 1971. The first was Rebecca Stevens, wife of former president Siaka Stevens, who lived at the official presidential residence at King Harmon Road while her husband lived at Kabasa Lodge.

The current First Lady of Sierra Leone is Fatima Maada Bio, wife of President Julius Maada Bio who took office on April 4, 2018.

== First ladies of Sierra Leone (1971–present) ==
Number	Name	Term begins	Term ends	First Lady of Sierra Leone
1st	Rebecca Stevens	21 April 1971	28 November 1985	Siaka Stevens
2nd	Hannah Momoh	28 November 1985		Joseph Saidu Momoh
3rd	Fatmata Momoh			Joseph Saidu Momoh
4th	Patricia Kabbah	29 March 1996	1998	Ahmed Tejan Kabbah
5th	Sia Koroma	17 September 2007	4 April 2018	Ernest Bai Koroma
6th	Fatima Bio	4 April 2018	current	Julius Maada Bio
