= Sierra Leone House of Parliament =

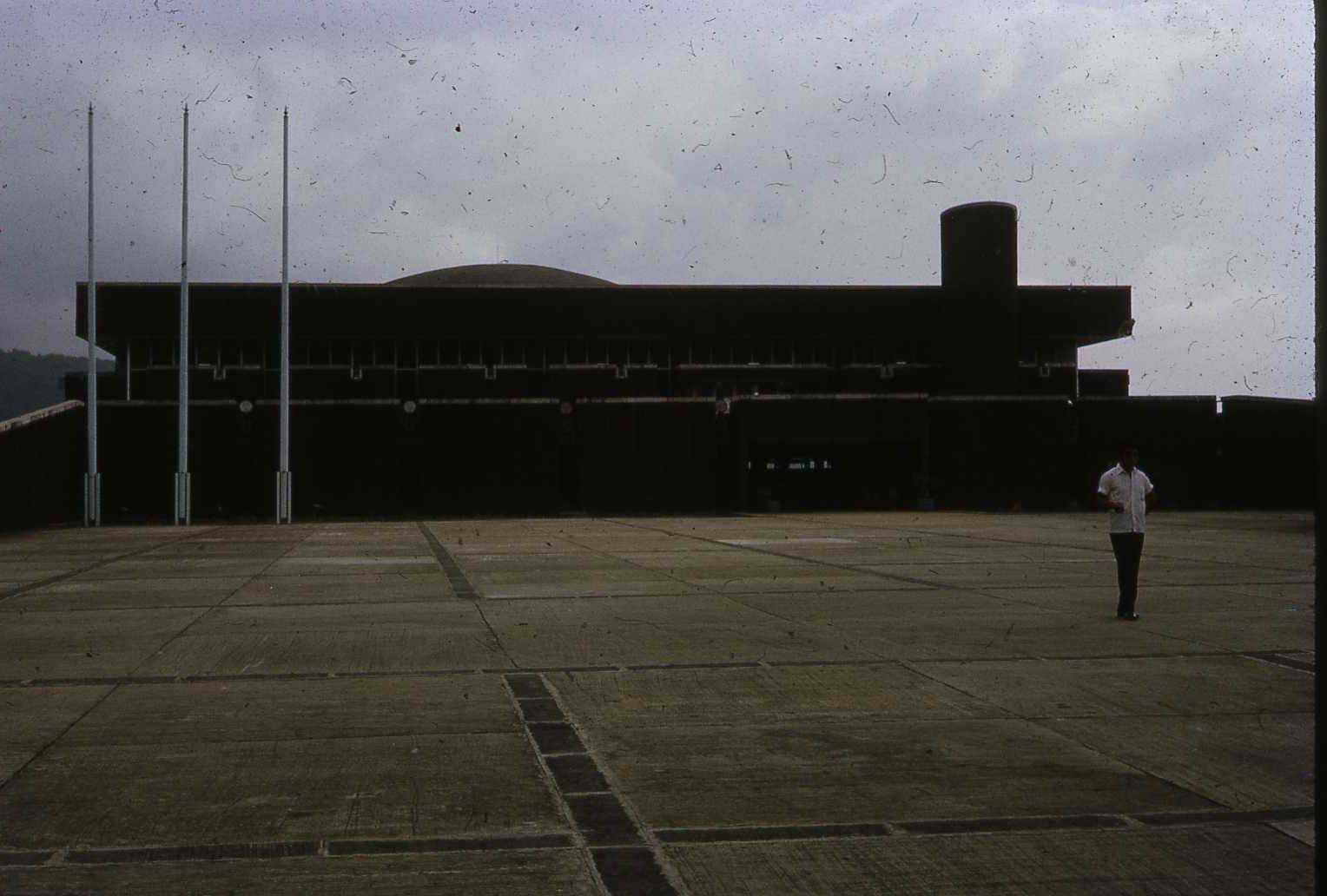
- Sierra Leone House of Parliament
- Interactive map of the Sierra Leone House of Parliament area

General information
- Location: Tower Hill, Freetown, Sierra Leone
- Coordinates: 8°29′12.21″N 13°14′2.1″W
- Owner: Government of Sierra Leone

Design and construction
- Architect: Ram Karmi

Sierra Leone House of Parliament is the meeting place of the Parliament of Sierra Leone, the legislative body of the Republic of Sierra Leone. It is located at Tower Hill in central Freetown, within the central business district in downtown Freetown. At the entrance of the House of Parliament is located the historic Martello tower.

The State House, the official workplace of the president of Sierra Leone, and the Sierra Leone Ministry of Defence and National Security building are located near the House of Parliament.

== Construction ==
The House of Parliament's location was chosen by its architect, the Israeli Brutalist Ram Karmi, who saw Tower Hill as a suitable location for the building, imagining Freetown as the Athens of Africa, with its parliament its Acropolis. In designing the building, he envisioned a "Knesset without columns." His vision was opposed by fellow architect Maxwell Fry, who first suggested that the non-central Tower Hill be used for either European housing or preserved as a nature park. Another objection held that the creation of new buildings would threaten demolition of the Martello tower in the area. M.C.F. Easmon added it as one of the National Monuments of Sierra Leone to protect it.

When Ram Karmi's proposal was accepted, a contract was awarded to Solel Boneh, an Israeli firm, as no English firm would accept a 7 month deadline. The construction budget was set for £400,000, of which Israeli loans paid half. The actual construction cost ended up exceeding £900,000. Construction of the House of Parliament was well underway before Sierra Leone's independence on 27 April 1967, but only the main chamber was ready to be used for the country's independence ceremony, which was officiated by the Duke of Kent.

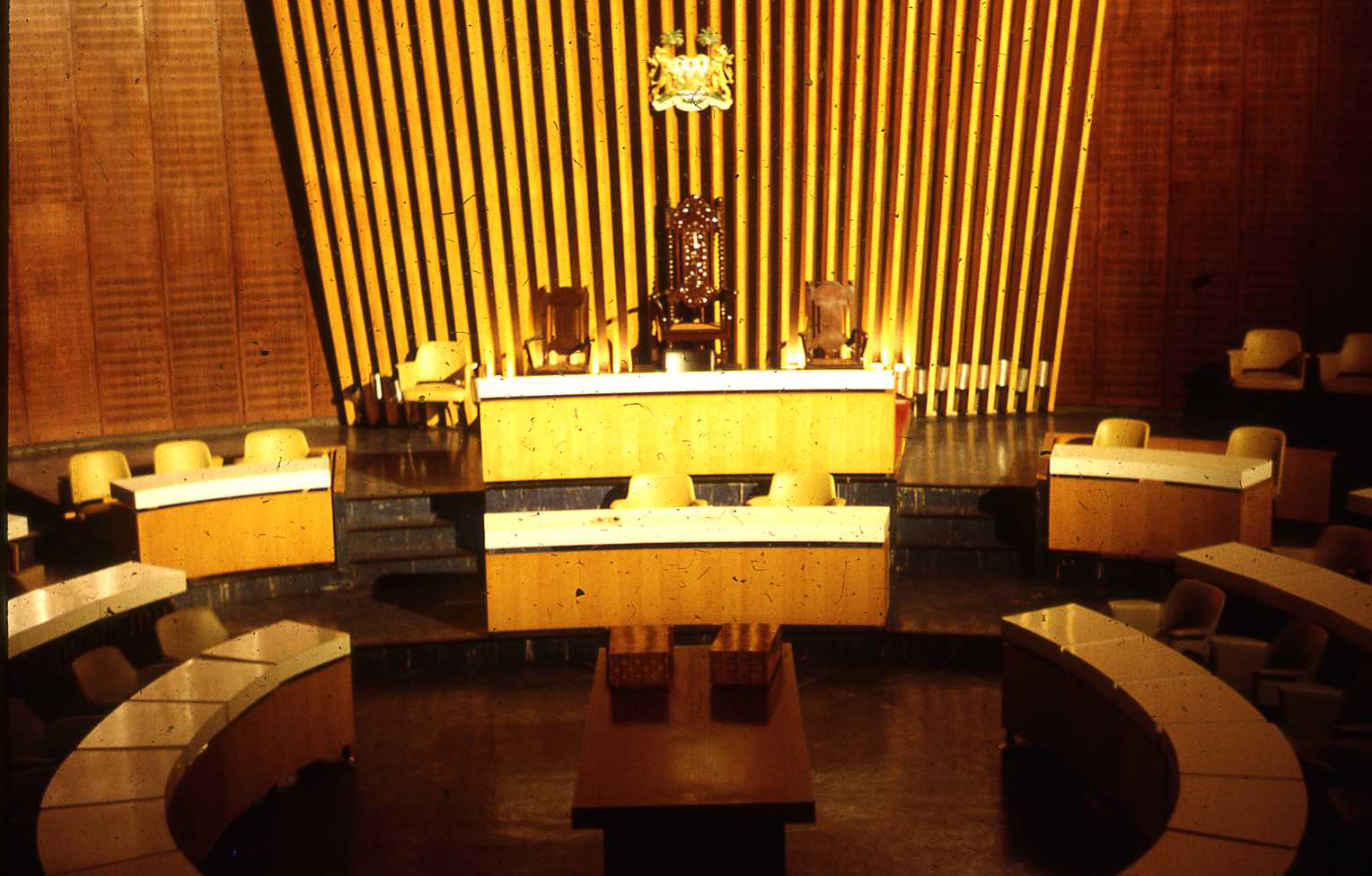
The internal chamber of the House of Parliament

=== Design ===
As a Brutalist building, the House of Parliament uses cubic geometry, and is itself square-shaped. There is a short dome colored a faint gold color on top of the building, which is, according to architect Zvi Efrat, "a strange feature that has nothing to do with Brutualist architecture." The meaning of its inclusion is unclear. It may be a reference to a similar dome in the Liberian Capitol Building, or a nod to Freetown's Muslim population, where it would reference the Dome of the Rock. A similar dome appears in one of Ram Karmi's proposals for the Knesset. In another difference from typical Brutalist style, the façade uses locally sourced stones, giving it a red color.

The House of Parliament is divided into four wings for the cardinal directions. Its west wing has the chamber of parliament, committee rooms, and the offices of minority leader and whips. The south wing has offices for the speaker of the house, deputy speaker, majority leader, clerk and deputy clerk. The north wing has the canteen and library, and the south has the main entrance. Its entrance has a high ceiling reminiscent of the Palazzo style architecture.

=== Plans for continuing construction ===
Later stages of construction, phases two and three, were to be the creation of offices for all members of parliament and finishing touches respectively. These did not commence immediately because of the Sierra Leone severing relations to Israel during the Yom Kippur War. Ahmad Tejan Kabbah planned in 1996 to begin phase two, but these plans were disrupted by the 1996 Sierra Leonean coup d'état. A later refurbishment project with Chinese contractors in 2004 could not figure out the engineering of the building.

== Security ==
The House of Parliament is protected by the Sierra Leone Police. Visitors are allowed entry, even when Parliament is in session. Visitors must present documentation showing citizenship before entry. A group seeking entry will need prior approval with a stated reason.

== See also ==
- List of Brutalist structures
