= Isata Jabbie Kabbah =

Sierra Leonean politician

Isata Jabbie

Personal details
- Born: 1970 (age 55–56) Kono
- Party: Sierra Leone People's Party (SLPP)
- Spouse: Ahmad Tejan Kabbah

Isata Jabbie Kabbah is a Sierra Leonean politician. She is president of the All Political Parties Women Association, APPWA. She is the widow of the 3rd President of Sierra Leone, Ahmed Tejan Kabbah.

She is the former women's leader of the Sierra Leone People's Party (SLPP).

On 11 May 2008, she married Ahmed Tejan Kabbah, then President of Sierra Leone, 38 years her senior (for he was an elderly widower with adult children and grandchildren, and she was never married at the time of their marriage).

Honorary titles
Preceded by Patricia Kabbah	First Lady of Sierra Leone; 1998–2007	Succeeded by Sia Koroma
