= Sama Sahr Mondeh =

Sierra Leonean politician

Sama Sahr Mondeh is a Sierra Leonean politician and agriculturalist. Mondeh has been the Minister of Agriculture and Food Security under President Ahmad Tejan Kabbah since 2002.

== Sources ==
- List of government minister of Sierra Leone on cia.gov
