= Joe Blell =

Sierra Leonean diplomat

Deputy Minister of Defence and National Security
- In office 2002–2007

High Commissioner of Sierra Leone to Nigeria
- In office 1993–2002

Personal details
- Born: Joseph Christopher Blell Sierra Leone
- Party: Sierra Leone People's Party
- Children: 2, including Di'Ja

Joseph C. Blell is a politician from the opposition Sierra Leone People's Party. He served as Sierra Leone's High Commissioner to Nigeria from 1993 to 2002. He was also Sierra Leone's Deputy Minister of Defence from 2002 until 2007.

== Career ==
He entered the Military School, Juba Barracks, Freetown from 1961 to 1966. He was the President of the African Centre for Strategic Studies, Chapter 29 (2011–2015).

Blell was the Deputy Minister of Defence from 2002 to 2007 (President Tejan-Kabbah was the Substantive Minister). Blell, the de facto Minister, was the Pivot of the Restructuring Programme of the Republic of Sierra Leone Armed Forces. The Armed Forces had been decimated by the Rebel War, was now a force to be reckoned with. It was during this period that the Armed Forces were reduced from a war-time high of over 20,000 to just over 8000 at present. Before that he served as Sierra Leone High Commissioner to Federal Republic of Nigeria and accredited to several counties: Ghana, Benin, Togo, Equatorial Guinea and Republic of Congo. Blell was also accredited to the Economic Community of West African States (ECOWAS) from 1993 to 2002.

He was the Team Manager of the National Football Team (Leone Stars) that qualified for the African Cup of Nations in 1994 (Tunisia) and won the African Zone II Football Trophy for the first time in December 1993. Prior to his appointment as the Sierra Leone High Commissioner to the Federal Republic of Nigeria, he was the Regional Director of the Canadian University Service Overseas (CUSO) to Nigeria based in Kano and later Kaduna in Northern Nigeria (1979–1985). His main area of responsibility was mainly the former North East states of Borno, Bauchi and Gongola. In 2020, he was appointed chairman and Commissioner of the National Telecommunications Commission of Sierra Leone.

== Personal ==
He is the father of Nigerian-Sierra Leonian singer/songwriter Di'Ja.
