= First Lady of Sierra Leone =

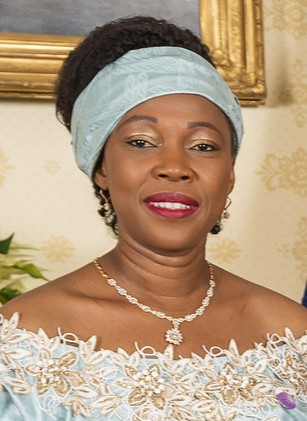
- Incumbent; Fatima Maada Bio since April 4, 2018
- Style: Lady Bio
- Residence: State Lodge
- Inaugural holder: Rebecca Stevens
- Website: firstlady.gov.sl/

The title First Lady of Sierra Leone is held by the female spouse of the president of Sierra Leone. The first lady is a representative of the people of Sierra Leone at home and abroad. The Office of the First Lady is an extension of State House and is responsible for social events and ceremonies at State Lodge. The First Lady's Office is not established by an act of parliament and cannot receive government funding.

Since 1971, Sierra Leone has had six first ladies. The first was Rebecca Stevens, wife of former president Siaka Stevens, who remained at her family's private residence at 1 King Harmon Road while her husband lived at State House and Kabasa Lodge.

== Office of the First Lady of Sierra Leone ==
Sierra Leone's third first lady was one of the country's foremost lawyers Patricia Kabbah. Kabbah had been the chairperson of the committee that restored Sierra Leone to civilian rule and she helped draft the country's constitution in 1995. When her husband won the election, she sought to set up the first Office of the First Lady in the history of Sierra Leone. Her husband 0gave in to pressure from stalwarts in their political party and denied her request. Kabbah died of cancer in 1998.

Shortly after her death, her husband Ahmad Tejan Kabbah married Isata Kabbah who became the 4th first lady.

In 2007, Sia Koroma, a biochemist and psychiatric nurse, became the 5th first lady of Sierra Leone. Koroma successful established the Office of the First Lady and completely redefined the role. In addition to her representative role, she worked on three initiatives: WISH to support mothers and children, FLAXIS to provide training and the Danké Koroma Foundation.

The current first lady of Sierra Leone is Fatima Maada Bio, wife of President Julius Maada Bio who took office on April 4, 2018. Bio, an actor and film maker, has continued in the tradition of Sia Koroma and is maintaining the Office of the First Lady.

== First ladies of Sierra Leone (1971–present) ==
Number	Name	Term begins	Term ends	First Lady of Sierra Leone
1st	Rebecca Stevens	21 April 1971	28 November 1985	Siaka Stevens
2nd	Hannah Momoh	28 November 1985	29 April 1992	Joseph Saidu Momoh
3rd	Patricia Kabbah	29 March 1996	1998	Ahmed Tejan Kabbah
4th	Isata Jabbie Kabbah	1998	17 September 2007	Ahmed Tejan Kabbah
5th	Sia Koroma	17 September 2007	4 April 2018	Ernest Bai Koroma
6th	Fatima Maada Bio	4 April 2018	current	Julius Maada Bio
