= 2000s in Sierra Leone =

== 2001 ==
General elections due for early 2001 were postponed in Februaryof that year due to the insecurity caused by the civil war. In May 2001, sanctions were imposed on Liberia for its support for the rebels, and U.N. peacekeepers began to make headway in disarming the various factions. Although disarmament of rebel and progovernment militias proceeded slowly and fighting continued to occur, by January 2002 most of the estimated 45,000 fighters had surrendered their weapons. In a ceremony that month, government and rebel leaders declared the civil war to have ended. An estimated 50,000 persons died in the conflict.

== 2002 ==
Elections were finally held in May 2002. President Ahmad Tejan Kabbah was reelected, and his Sierra Leone People's Party won a 83 of the 112 parliamentary seats.

== 2003 ==
In June 2003, the UN ban on the sale of Sierra Leone diamonds expired and was not renewed.

== 2004 ==
The UN disarmament and rehabilitation program for Sierra Leone's fighters was completed in February 2004, by which time more 70,000 former combatants had been helped. UN forces returned primary responsibility for security in the area around the capital to Sierra Leone's police and armed forces in September 2004. It was the last part of the country to be turned over.

== 2005 ==
Some UN peacekeepers remained to assist the Sierra Leone government until the end of 2005.

== Truth and Reconciliation Commission ==
The 1999 Lomé Accord called for the establishment of a Truth and Reconciliation Commission to provide a forum for both victims and perpetrators of human rights violations during the conflict to tell their stories and facilitate genuine reconciliation. Subsequently, the Sierra Leonean Government and the UN agreed to set up the Special Court for Sierra Leone to try those who "bear the greatest responsibility for the commission of crimes against humanity, war crimes and serious violations of international humanitarian law, as well as crimes under relevant Sierra Leonean law within the territory of Sierra Leone since November 30, 1996." Both the Truth and Reconciliation Commission and the Special Court began operating in the summer of 2002. The Truth and Reconciliation Commission released its final Report to the government in October 2004. In June 2005, the Government of Sierra Leone issued a White Paper on the Commission’s final report which accepted some but not all of the Commission's recommendations.

== Special Court ==
In March 2003 the Special Court for Sierra Leone issued its first indictments. Foday Sankoh, already in custody, was indicted, along with notorious RUF field commander Sam Bockarie, Johnny Paul Koroma, and Samuel Hinga Norman, the Minister of Interior and former head of the Civil Defence Forces, among several others. Norman was arrested when the indictments were announced, while Bockarie and Koroma remained in hiding. On May 5, 2003 Bockarie was killed in Liberia. Two of the accused, Sankoh and Norman, have died while incarcerated. On March 25, 2006, with the election of Liberian President Ellen Johnson Sirleaf, Nigerian President Olusegun Obasanjo permitted transfer of Charles Taylor, who had been living in exile in the Nigerian town of Calabar, to Sierra Leone for prosecution. Two days later, Taylor attempted to flee Nigeria, but he was apprehended by Nigerian authorities and transferred to Freetown under UN guard.

== 2007 ==
Elections held on August 11, 2007 had a good turnout and were initially judged by official observers to be "free, fair and credible".
