= Yasmin Jusu-Sheriff =

Sierra Leonean lawyer and activist

- Education: University of London and the University of Oxford
- Occupation: lawyer
- Known for: women's movement that helped to restore democracy

Yasmin Jusu-Sheriff is a Sierra Leonean lawyer and activist. She was involved in the women's movement that helped to restore democracy to her country.

== Life ==
Jusu-Sheriff was the daughter of Gladys and Salia Jusu-Sheriff. Her four siblings were Salia (Jnr), Nalinie, Nadia and Sheku. She graduated at the University of London before she took her master's degree at the University of Oxford.

She was an active campaigner in Sierra Leone, especially after 1991 when the Sierra Leone Civil War started. She and fellow lawyer Isha Dyfan and Patricia Kabbah worked with groups like the Mano River Women's Peace Network to ensure that wider international community were aware of the abuses that were taking place in Sierra Leone. She and Isha Dyfan were both lawyers and they had both been members of the Sierra Leone Human Rights Society. They had a wide network of contacts.

In 1995, she and Zainab Bangura founded Women Organized for a Morally Enlightened Nation (W.O.M.E.N.), a non-partisan women's rights group in Sierra Leone.

She was the executive secretary of Sierra Leone's Truth and Reconciliation Commission which was created in 1999 under Bishop Joseph Christian Humper. The commission was modelled after the one seen in South Africa although this one was a poor relative. One million dollars had been set aside in 2002, but the cost then was put at nine million. The United Nations appealed for someone to find the missing cash.

Her father died in London in 2009 and he was buried in Sierra Leone after a state funeral. Her mother survived him and she became a trustee for refugee work in Islington.

She is on the board of Femmes Africa Solidarité.
