= Rebecca Stevens =

Rebecca Stevens may refer to:

- Rebecca Stevens (first lady), First Lady of Sierra Leone from 1971 to 1985
- Rebecca "Becky" Stevens, a character in the children's television series Grange Hill
- Rebecca Stevens (comics), a Marvel character

== See also ==
- Rebecca Stephens (disambiguation)
