= Mandingo Central Mosque =

Mosque in Freetown, Western Area Urban, Sierra Leone

Religion
- Affiliation: Sunni Islam
- Ecclesiastical or organizational status: Mosque
- Leadership: Sheikh Alhaji Abubakarr Swarray (Chief Imam)
- Status: Active

Location
- Location: Freetown
- Country: Sierra Leone

Architecture
- Type: Mosque

The Mandingo Central Mosque is a mosque located in the Magazine Court neighborhood of East Freetown, Sierra Leone. It is one of the largest mosques in Sierra Leone.

== Overview ==
The mosque was primarily constructed to serve members of the Mandingo people of Sierra Leone, although Muslims from different ethnic groups are welcome to pray and worship at the mosque.

The chief Imam of the Mandingo Central Mosque is Sheikh Alhaji Abubakarr Swarray. The spiritual and tribal leader of the Sierra Leonean Mandingo is Chief Alhaji Alimamy Samba Demba Tarawallie, who is also a member of the mosque.

Former President of Sierra Leone, Ahmad Tejan Kabbah, was a regular member of the mosque and he usually prayed at the mosque during and after his presidency. President Kabbah"s funeral prayer was held at the mosque. Other notable members of the mosque include former Sierra Leone Minister of Trade Usman Boie Kamara.

== See also ==
- Islam in Sierra Leone
- List of mosques in Africa
