= Isha Dyfan =

Sierra Leonean lawyer

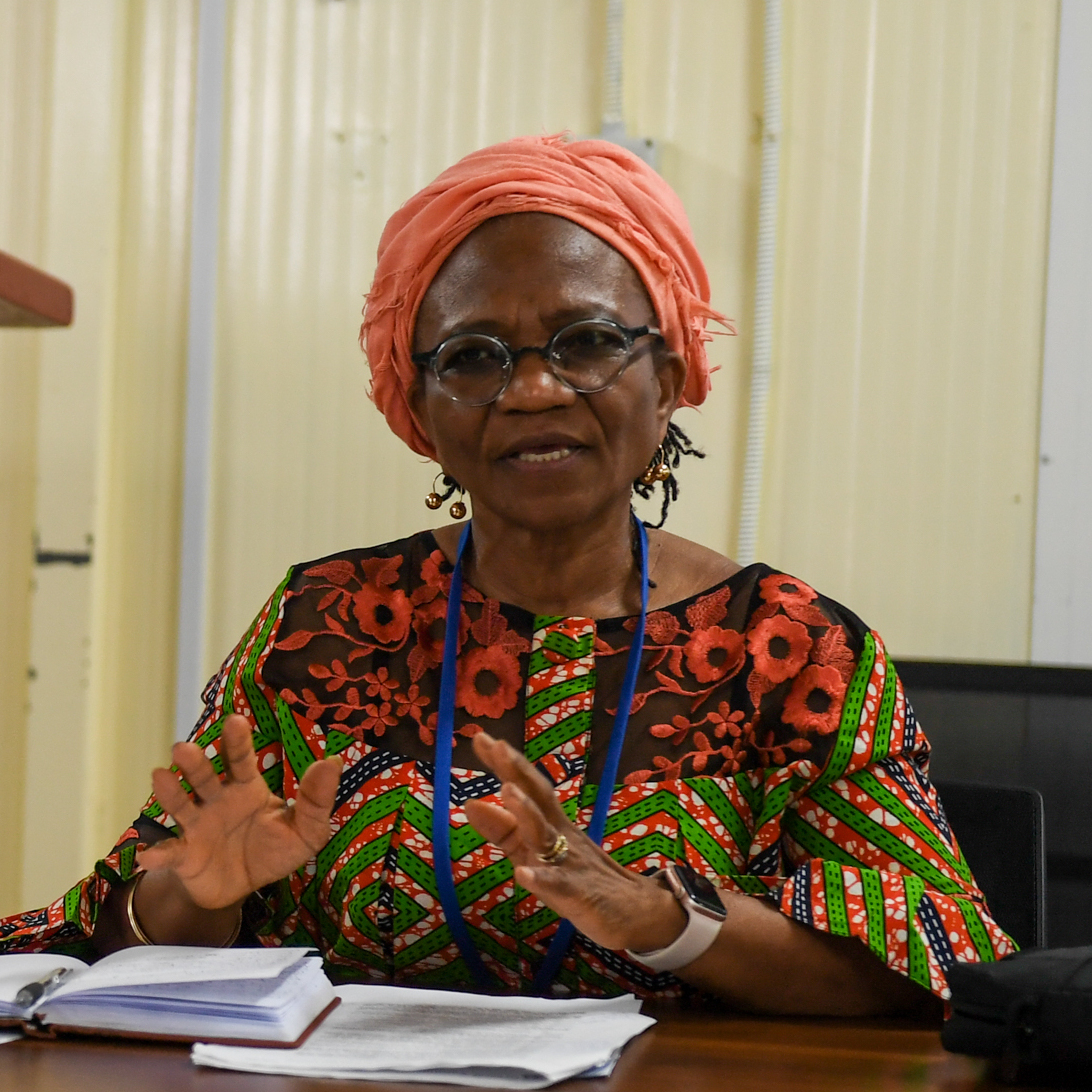
- Born: 1955 (age 70–71); Kenema
- Occupation: lawyer
- Known for: Independent Expert on the Situation of Human Rights in Somalia

Isha Lanla Dyfan (born 1955) is a Sierra Leonean lawyer who became the United Nations' Independent Expert on the Situation of Human Rights in Somalia in 2020. She has previously worked for the United Nations–African Union Mission in Darfur and Amnesty International.

== Life ==
Dyfan was born in Kenema in Sierra Leone in 1955. She attended the University of London and she was accepted at the bar in the UK in 1984. She was also accepted in Sierra Leone and she practiced law for over twelve years there until the civil war made her leave for America. The Sierra Leone Civil War lasted from 1991 to 2002. During that time Dyfan, fellow lawyer Yasmin Jusu-Sheriff and Patricia Kabbah worked with groups like the Mano River Women's Peace Network to ensure that wider international community were aware of the abuses that were taking place in Sierra Leone.

She lived in Sudan's Darfur region when she worked for UNAMID, the United Nations–African Union Mission in Darfur for over four years where she became the Chief of their Human Rights Section.

She started work at Amnesty International in 2018 and she became their Director of International Advocacy. In May 2020 she was identified as the United Nations Human Rights Council's Independent Expert on the Situation of Human Rights in Somalia. These experts are appointed by OHCHR for three years and they are unpaid. In 2023 there were 60 of these experts. She was one of the fourteen experts who were looking at particular countries.

In May 2024 she ended a third visit to Somalia. Attacks by Al-Shabaab were still taking a toll particularly on civilians. She supported the government's plans but urged them to deal with gender based violence. She highlighted climate change and the four million Somalian children who were displaced. After the five day visit she published her findings and took part in a Q&A with journalists.
