= Femmes Africa Solidarité =

The NGO Femmes Africa Solidarité (FAS) was founded by African women leaders in 1996 in Geneva to prevent and resolve conflicts in Africa and to empower woman for leadership in peace building. Its conceptual framework is the UN Resolution 1325.

The FAS philosophy is that every woman in Africa can play a role to achieve peace and improve their quality of life. Women are not perceived by FAS as passive victims: They are acknowledged as key civil society agents with enormous potential.

Women, in the FAS vision, can make a big difference towards a new social order that guarantees the respect of women's rights and women's equal responsibility for and equal access and opportunity to participate in decision-making. FAS has an executive board which has included the Sierra Leonean lawyer Yasmin Jusu-Sheriff.

Among the FAS principles are women's empowerment and ownership to sustainable peace as a paramount; women's natural tendency to solidarity making them natural peace advocates; and women's equal participation in decision-making processes as an ultimate necessity, based in gender parity and competence as well.
