= Jamil Sahid Mohamed Khalil =

Jamil Sahid Mohamed Khalil (1936–2000) was a Sierra Leonean-Lebanese businessman, diamonds and commodities trader. He attained prominence in the diamond industry across Africa and Antwerp and became an influential figure in the politics of Sierra Leone through his close association with President Siaka Stevens. Jamil also came to dominate other business sectors including fisheries, tourism construction and aviation.

In 1987, he and several prominent politicians, including Vice President Francis Minah, were implicated, convicted and sentenced to death in the failed assassination plot against President Joseph Momoh. Jamil escaped and was exiled from Sierra Leone.

He returned to Freetown before leaving it again during the 1999 RUF invasion.

== Early life ==
Khalil was born in Freetown in 1936 to a Sierra Leonean father with Lebanese roots and a Sierra Leonean mother.

== Career ==
Jamil Sahid Mohamed Khalil built his vast fortune by exporting diamonds to Antwerp during the seventies and eighties. He was arguably the most successful Lebanese trader in West Africa. As a result of his activities, he was considered one of the richest and most powerful men in Africa along with then-President Siaka Stevens.

== Association with Siaka Stevens ==
Khalil found a kindred spirit in President Siaka Stevens who was equally keen to exploit Sierra Leone's gold and diamonds resource for personal gain. In Sierra Leone's post-colonial era, Siaka Stevens association with Jamil Sahid Mohamed Khalil would have a dramatic effect on government policy. Both of them would, for a time, count themselves among Africa's wealthiest men.

The alliance of Stevens and Khalil was one of convenience. Stevens had access but as a head of state he was prohibited from engaging in commerce.

Khalil became a beneficiary of the kleptocracy established by President Siaka Stevens. His stewardship of the president's personal finances made him the second most powerful man in Sierra Leone. Jamil encouraged Stevens to ally himself with the Lebanese merchant community who controlled a portion of the official diamond trade and also ran the majority of the unofficial diamond trade. Stevens supported illegal diamond smuggling so much so that on 3 November 1969, $3.4 million worth of the Sierra Leonean government's monthly production of diamonds vanished, allegedly at the order of Stevens.

The president granted Khalil's National Trading Company a monopoly to import more than eighty-seven commodities. and turned a blind eye as Jamil become the foremost exporter of the country's rare gems and minerals, raking in over $300 million. Jamil was christened the "Diamond King".

By 1971 the President had put an end to the De Beers monopoly at the request of Jamil, who had already managed to acquire 12% of the concession. By 1984 Khalil bought the remaining shares from De Beers. That marked the first time De Beers ever lost a monopoly in Africa.

Tommy Taylor-Morgan, the Minister of Finance, warned that Sierra Leone was losing in excess of US$160 million of diamond income annually to diamond smuggling.

In a profile of Khalil, C. Magbaily Fyle in his book "Historical Dictionary of Sierra Leone," writes that "By the end of the 1970s, Khalil was influencing government and ministerial appointments, and he was dreaded, feared or admired, depending on the perceptions of the viewer."

In 1978, International Construction Company, a construction company owned by Khalil was given the contract to build a presidential residence by President Stevens Located atop Juba Hill in Freetown and spanning over 25 acres, the construction of Kabassa Lodge took two years to complete. It was finished in time for the 1980 O.A.U. Summit.

=== The Palestine Liberation Organization connections ===
So great was Khalil's influence that he managed to persuade Stevens's handpicked successor, President Joseph Saidu Momoh, to invite Yasir Arafat for a state visit, at the behest of his personal friend, King Hussein of Jordan. The purpose of Arafat's visit was to secure a deal with Momoh to run a Palestinian paramilitary training camp on one of the islands off Sierra Leone's coast. Arafat offered Momoh $8 million but Momoh eventually caved to Western pressure and officially said no. Instead he permitted Khalil to keep a so-called 500 strong "personal security force" which included Palestinian exiles...

== Second exile ==
Khalil fled from Sierra Leone during the 1999 invasion of Freetown by the RUF rebels. One of his sons was a victim of the atrocities committed by the rebels and was shot dead, in Khalil's presence, when the rebels attacked his house in Freetown. The son was said to have taken the bullet for his father. His old friend, Lebanese Speaker, Nabih Berri arranged for him to escape to Lebanon on a diplomatic passport. Lebanon's legislature.

Khalil died of a stroke in Lebanon in 2000.

== See also ==
- Joseph Saidu Momoh
- Revolutionary United Front
- Siaka Stevens
- Sierra Leone
- Antwerp
