= Ministry of Defence and National Security (Sierra Leone) =

Government ministry of Sierra Leone

Sierra Leone Ministry of Defence and National Security
Agency overview
- Formed: 1894
- Headquarters: State Avenue, Tower Hill, Freetown, Sierra Leone
- Agency executive: Kellie Hassan Conteh, Minister of Defence
- Website: http://mod.gov.sl/

Sierra Leone Ministry of Defence and National Security is a Sierra Leonean government department in charge of implementing and supervising the Sierra Leone Armed Forces and the territorial security of Sierra Leone's international border and defending the national interests of Sierra Leone.

== Location ==
The Ministry of Defence and National Security building is located in State Avenue at Tower Hill in central Freetown, a few distance from the State House.

== Mission ==
Mission Statement The mission of the Ministry is to formulate, implement, monitor and evaluate strategic defence policy for the Republic of Sierra Leone Armed Forces (RSLAF) that is effective and fostered within a framework of democratic governance.

== Objectives ==
To formulate and implement strategic defence policy; To develop and maintain a re-structured and robust RSLAF that is well trained, well disciplined and well cared for; To equip and provide logistics support to the RSLAF; To transform the RSLAF into an organization that is accountable, incorruptible and subject to democratic control; To continually evolve and improve the RSLAF; To deliver the endorsed Defence Missions and Military Tasks.

== Minister of Defence ==
The department is headed by the Minister of Defence and National Security, who must be a civilian, and is appointed by the President of Sierra Leone and must be confirmed by the Parliament of Sierra Leone in order to take office.

The current Minister of Defence and National Security is a retired Brig Gen Kellie Hassan Conteh, who was appointed by President Julius Maada Bio in October 2020. The Sierra Leone Minister of Defence is one of the most important, government agencies in the country and the position is usually held by a retired Sierra Leonean military officer.

Like all government ministries in the country, the Minister of Defence can be dismissed by the president of Sierra Leone at any time. During the Sierra Leone civil war, Sierra Leone's president Ahmad Tejan Kabbah appointed himself Minister of Defence and National Security, which is legal.

=== List of ministers ===
- Sir Milton Margai, April 1961 − April 1964
- Sir Albert Margai, April 1964 − March 1967
- Andrew Juxon-Smith, March 1967 − April 1968
- Siaka Probyn Stevens, April 1968 − 1976 − ?
- Julius Maada Bio, 1993−1996
- Ahmad Tejan Kabbah, 2 November 1999 − September 2007
- Alfred Paolo Conteh, 26 October 2007 − 5 May 2018
- Simeon Nasiru Sheriff, 5 May 2018 − 20 November 2019
- Kellie Hassan Conteh, 20 November 2019 − Incumbent
