= Hannah Momoh =

Former First Lady of Sierra Leone

First Lady of Sierra Leone
- In office 28 November 1985 – 29 April 1992
- Preceded by: Rebecca Stevens
- Succeeded by: Patricia Kabbah

Personal details
- Party: All People's Congress (APC)
- Spouse: Joseph Saidu Momoh

Hannah Momoh (born as Hannah Victoria Lucinda Wilson) served as First Lady of Sierra Leone from 28 November 1985 – 29 April 1992. In 1967 she married Joseph Saidu Momoh, 2nd President of Sierra Leone. They had one daughter.

Honorary titles
Preceded by Rebecca Stevens	First Lady of Sierra Leone; 1985–1992	Succeeded by Patricia Kabbah
