= Kabassa Lodge =

Coordinates: 8.44705937051286°N 13.269491499338054°W

Kabassa Lodge is the former residence of the President of Sierra Leone and currently belongs to the state of Sierra Leone. It is located on 25 acres at the summit of Juba Hill in Freetown, Sierra Leone.

== Early history ==
In 1978, President Siaka Stevens gave International Construction Company the contract to build a presidential residence. The company was owned by businessman Jamil Sahid Mohamed Khalil.

Kabassa Lodge took two years and some months to complete. It was finished in time for the 1980 O.A.U. Summit.

== Confiscation ==
After the 1992 coup, Valentine Strasser, the head of state, confiscated and occupied Kabassa Lodge, declaring it a state asset.

== Ownership ==
Over the years, ownership of Kabassa Lodge has been disputed. Many Sierra Leoneans holding that the property was paid for by the state and therefore is the property of the state. However, Siaka Stevens willed the property to his children and his family believe that they are the rightful owners.

In 2012, during the Ernest Bai Koroma presidency, the All People's Congress (APC) administration gave the property to the Stevens' family, who turned it into several rental apartments.

The building remains in a state of disrepair.
