= Rebecca Stephens =

Rebecca Stephens may refer to:

- Rebecca Stephens (climber) (born 1961), British mountaineer and author
- Rebecca Stephens (politician) (born 1983), Australian politician
- Rebecca Stephens (singer) (born 1982), English indie pop performer also known as RiotBecki
- Rebecca Stephens, one of the pseudonyms of Mary Millington (1945–1979)

== See also ==
- Rebecca Stevens (disambiguation)
