= Truth and Reconciliation Commission (Sierra Leone) =

Human rights investigation group

The Sierra Leone's Truth and Reconciliation Commission was a truth commission created as part of the Lomé Peace Accord, which ended the 11-year civil war in July 1999.

== Background and creation ==
The Sierra Leone Civil War began on March 23, 1991. The Revolutionary United Front, supported by the National Patriotic Front of Liberia, attempted to overthrow the Joseph Momoh government. This attempt resulted in the Sierra Leone Civil War, that lasted 11 years, leaving over 50,000 dead.

The Truth and Reconciliation Commission was created as part of the Lomé Peace Accord, signed on July 7, 1999, which was intended to end the civil war in Sierra Leone. This accord was signed by then President Ahmad Tejan Kabbah and the leader of the Revolutionary United Front (RUF) Foday Sankoh.

== Aims and mandate ==
The aims of the commission were to establish "an impartial historical record of violations and abuses of human rights and international humanitarian law related to the armed conflict in Sierra Leone from the beginning of the Conflict in 1991 to the signing of the Lomé Peace Agreement; to address impunity, to respond to the needs of the victims, to promote healing and reconciliation and to prevent a repetition of the violations and abuses suffered." The commission was chaired by Bishop Joseph Christian Humper. It operated from 2002 to 2004, with a final report being presented to the United Nations Security Council on October 5, 2004.

The commission's mandate was to "provide a degree of accountability for human rights abuses committed during the conflict." Below is a brief summary of its mandate.

- To construct an impartial historical record of violations and abuses of human rights during the armed conflict in Sierra Leone.
- To address impunity, to respond to the needs of the victims, to promote healing and reconciliation, and to prevent a repetition of the violations and abuses suffered.
- To investigate and report on the causes, nature, and extent of violations and abuses to the highest possible degree in order to determine a proper course of action for reconciliation purposes.
- To help restore the dignity of the victims, and to provide an opportunity for healing and reconciliation between the victims and those who carried out the abuses.

The commission also strove to give special attention to victims of sexual abuse and to children who were either victims or perpetrators.

== Commissioners ==
The commissioners were:

- Bishop Joseph Christian Humper - Chairman
- Hon. Justice Laura Marcus-Jones - Deputy Chairperson
- Professor William Schabas
- Yasmin Louise Sooka
- Sylvanus Torto
- Ajaratu Satang Jow
- Professor John Kamara

The executive secretary was the lawyer Yasmin Jusu-Sheriff.

== Findings ==
A major task of the TRC was to interview victims on both sides of the conflict and report on what they found. The commission reported a number of findings, including:

- The conflict and post-independence period preceding it represent the most shameful years of Sierra Leone's history. This conflict reflects an extraordinary failure of leadership individuals amongst the government, society, and public.
- The central cause of the war was endemic greed, corruption, and nepotism that deprived the nation of its dignity and reduced its citizens to a state of poverty.
- Government accountability was non-existent, and the institution designed to uphold human rights was co-opted by the executive.
- Both sides of the conflict specifically targeted civilians.
- The Sierra Leone civil war was characterized by indiscriminate violence. It broke long-standing rules, defiled cherished traditions, sullied human respect and tore apart the very fabric of society.
- Children aged between ten and 14 years were especially targeted for forced recruitment. Girls between the ages of ten and 14 were targeted for rape and for abuse as sexual slaves. These women were also tortured and suffered cruel and inhumane acts.
- The leadership of the Revolutionary United Front and the Government of Sierra Leone are responsible for either authorising or instigating human rights violations against civilians. They also stand accused of failing to stop such atrocities, and for failing to acknowledge the occurrence of these atrocities.
- Contrary to popular belief, the exploitation of diamonds did not cause the conflict in Sierra Leone. However, various factions targeted diamondiferous areas in order to gain wealth to support their war efforts.
- The right to the truth is inalienable. This right should be upheld in terms of national and international law. It is the reaching of the wider truth through broad-based participation that permits a nation to examine itself honestly and to take effective measures to prevent a repetition of the past.

== Reparations ==
The Reparations section of the Truth Commission is aimed at creating a reparations program for the victims of the Sierra Leonean conflict. Such a program is difficult to create as there are a number of victims on both sides of the conflict, as well as a number of different crimes committed by both sides. Because of this, the commission had to determine who would benefit from a reparations program.

In designing a reparations programme for the victims of the Sierra Leonean conflict, the Commission had to take into account a number of factors. It would have been gratifying if all victims of the conflict could benefit from a reparations programme but such a programme would be totally impossible for the country to implement. The Commission therefore had to determine who would benefit from a reparations programme. The Commission determined the category of beneficiaries by considering those victims who were particularly vulnerable because of the human rights violations they had suffered and the harm that they continued to live with.

The TRC Act did not explicitly use the term "reparations". Instead, they were instructed to "address the needs of the victims," and restore the human dignity of victims" as well as "promote healing and reconciliation."

== Recommendations ==
The Truth and Reconciliation Commission Act of 2000 requires any commission to make recommendations concerning the reforms and measures needed to achieve the object of the commission. These recommendations are crucial in order to promote the healing process for the nation after the conflict. In the case of the Sierra Leone commission, the reparations are aimed at the "building of a new Sierra Leone based on the values of human dignity, tolerance and respect for the rights of all persons." The main recommendations of the commission were:

- The commission found that due to a lack of visionary leadership, there was no one to steer the country away from its slide into chaos and civil war. Because of this, the commission called on leaders from all levels of Sierra Leonean society to commit themselves to employing better forms of leadership.
- The central cause of the war was endemic greed, corruption and nepotism, which deprived the nation of its dignity and forced its citizens into poverty. The commission calls upon all members in the private sector to work together and usher in a new culture of ethics and to fight the "scourge of corruption which saps the life-force of Sierra Leone."
- The commission also recommended the implementation of a more modern human rights culture in which all "Sierra Leoneans respect each other's human rights, without exception." Therefore, the creation of a new constitution was also recommended. In the commission's words: "A Sierra Leone that is united around clear constitutional rights, values and principles has a promising future."
- Due to a severe lack of governmental accountability, democracy and the rule of law had ceased to exist. Therefore, the commission recommended that Sierra Leone must strengthen its institutions of accountability.

== Criticisms ==
In her book Unspeakable Truths: Facing the Challenge of Truth Commissions, Priscilla B. Hayner examines various truth commissions, one of which is the commission for Sierra Leone. One of her main criticisms of the report was the government's inability to enact many of the commission's recommendations. The "government was required to submit public quarterly reports on the actions it had taken to fulfill the recommendations." The government made slow but eventual progress in the implementation of the commission's recommendations.

Hayner also points out a common criticism facing many truth commissions; the need for "social forgetting". Many citizens in Sierra Leone felt that social forgetting was crucial to the process of healing and reconciliation. Unfortunately, many citizens were not able to simply forget, as they were pressured into making official statements to the commission regarding their experiences during the Civil War.
