= Tower Hill (Sierra Leone) =

Neighbourhood in Freetown, Sierra Leone

Coordinates: 8.48294°N 13.23372°W

Tower Hill is an affluent government and residential neighborhood in central Freetown, Sierra Leone. Tower Hill is located within the central business district in downtown Freetown. Tower Hill is the seat of the government of Sierra Leone, as it is home to the State House, Sierra Leone House of Parliament, the Ministry of Defence and National Security, the Bank of Sierra Leone, the National Electoral Commission, among other government buildings.

Tower Hill is named for the Martello tower which predated construction on it and is now a National Monument of Sierra Leone.

== List of government buildings ==
- State House
- Sierra Leone House of Parliament
- Ministry of Defence and National Security
- Bank of Sierra Leone
- National Electoral Commission
- Civil Service Training College
- Vice President’s Office
- Political Parties Registration Commission
- National Public Procurement Authority
- State Lottery
- Audit Service Commission
- Office of National Security
- Ministry of Foreign Affairs and International Cooperation
- Sierra Leone Investment (agency)
- Export and Promotion Agency
