= John K. Yambasu =

Sierra Leonean United Methodist bishop (1956–2020)

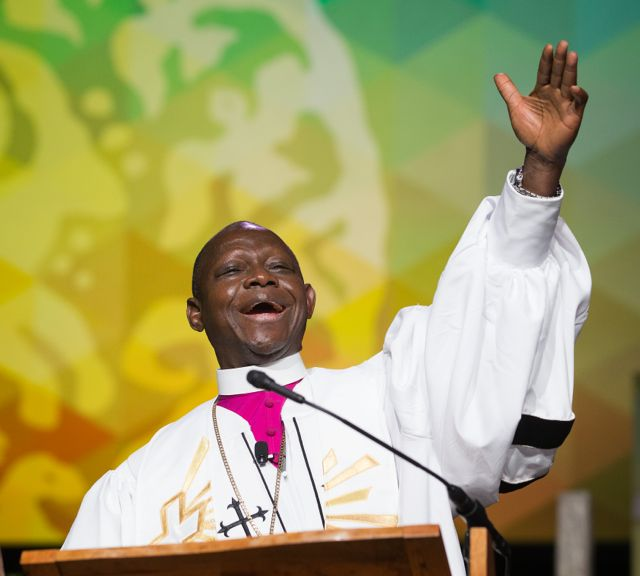
- Bishop John Yambasu preaching in 2016 at Portland, Oregon
- Born: August 24, 1956; Bo, Sierra Leone
- Died: August 16, 2020 (aged 63); Freetown, Sierra Leone
- Occupation: Bishop
- Spouse: Millicent
- Children: Rebecca, Adima, John, Emmanuel and Elizabeth

John K. Yambasu (24 August 1956 - 16 August 2020) was a Sierra Leonean Bishop of the United Methodist Church. He was elected Bishop in 2008 and became one of Sierra Leone's "most illustrious religious personalities." In 2019 he was instrumental in negotiating a proposed agreement to resolve conflicts in the worldwide church, but because of COVID-19 the proposal had not yet been approved before his death. He died in a road accident on August 16, 2020.

== Early life and career ==
John Yambasu was born in Bo in southern Sierra Leone and received his secondary education at the Moyamba Boys Secondary school (MBSS) one of the United Methodist (UMC) mission schools in Sierra Leone West Africa. He earned a bachelor's degree in agriculture from Njala University College in Sierra Leone. His Master of Theology degree was completed at Candler School of Theology, Emory University, Atlanta, Georgia in 1999.

Yambasu was ordained a deacon in the United Methodist Church in 1987, and an Elder in 1990. He served as associate pastor at Trinity U.M. Church in Moyamba, acting pastor and circuit minister at Musselman U.M. Church in Freetown, and acting pastor at Mayenkineh U.M. Church in Freetown. These ministries continued during the Sierra Leone civil war of 1991 to 2002.

Yambasu also taught in many schools in Sierra Leone, including the denomination's Harford School for Girls in Moyamba, southern Sierra Leone, where he was senior teacher and school chaplain from 1982 to 1990. He was the director for Christian education and youth ministries of the Sierra Leone Conference (1992–98). He also founded the Child Rescue Centre in Sierra Leone, serving as its executive director, 1999–2000. His work had a particular focus on providing ministry to young people affected by war.

== Service as bishop ==
Yambasu was elected bishop on December 20, 2008, succeeding Joseph C. Humper, who served during 1993–2008. After his election, he said “When I get back to Sierra Leone, the first thing I want to do is to engage in the peace-building process. I want to begin building a new relationship with my bishop, whom I am succeeding, and then the two of us will work together to make sure that the whole church is reconciled.” He became one of Sierra Leone's "most illustrious religious personalities."

Yambasu provided critical leadership during the deadly 2014-2016 Ebola outbreak that killed more than 11,000 people in Sierra Leone, Liberia and Guinea, and a 2017 landslide that killed hundreds after torrential rains and flooding in Freetown. Long-time friend Rev. Tom Berlin said, “I never trust people who say they are Christians but are sour. John was just the opposite. John’s joyful spirit would enable us to see the trust he had in the Lord.”

As president of the Council of Churches in Sierra Leone, Bishop Yambasu in 2018 said Sierra Leone is "a MESS state—Misery and Evil Side by Side." He also implored, “President Julius Maada Bio, you diligently served well in the Army where you left an indelible mark. Now as a democratic leader, you must reflect your true color to end impunity and fight corruption for a better society.”

Globally, the UMC struggled for many years to reconcile conflicts over gender, race, sexuality, language, and colonialism. United Methodists can be loosely described as traditionalist, centrist, or progressive on these issues. The most heated conflicts were expressed around LGBTQ inclusion and further amplified approaching the denomination's General Conference each four years. Regular conferences in 2012 and 2016 and a special conference in 2019 addressed opposing proposals that each group considered critical for true Christian faith, and each conference brought the denomination closer to schism. A majority of US delegates tended to favor progressive changes to the Book of Discipline, while a minority of US and most African delegates favored reinforcing traditionalist positions. The church is organized in about 40 nations around the world.

At the 2016 General Conference in Portland Oregon, Yambasu shared his story of growing up poor in Africa. "I know through and through what poverty is. I have slept with it, and I have woken up with it. Countless times, I went to bed without food. I have not only experienced poverty, but for almost 10 years, I had to wrestle with it. Today in Sierra Leone, I live side by side with poverty and misery.” From that context, he declared, “I am totally fed up! I am fed up! We need to engage each other! We need to embrace each other! We need to talk to each other! Red and yellow, black and white, poor and rich, haves and have-nots, gay or straight, bisexual or homosexual, polygamists, we all need to engage one another. We need to shake this place. We need to shake our churches. We need to torment God with our prayers and give us sleepless nights until we can look at each other in the face and say, ‘We are brothers and we are sisters.’” He concluded with a challenge to the whole church “to dismantle the demons of all sorts of inequalities in our world. We are called to do so with passion. But even more so, we must do so with compassion. Therefore, go!”

Yambasu described the 2019 special conference as a “catastrophe” and a “poor witness of who we are as United Methodists.” He said he returned to Sierra Leone “devastated.” American United Methodists had presented a “galaxy of plans, but none of these plans to us seem to provide the answer to the situation.” That summer, still hoping for a solution, he called a meeting of several bishops from outside the United States and leaders from several advocacy groups. Following his leadership, a small group negotiated with the help of a professional mediator through the remainder of the year, finally agreeing unanimously on a proposal to resolve the major conflicts by restructuring the church through separation. The agreement would allow each part of the Church to remain true to its theological understanding, while recognizing the dignity, equality, integrity, and respect of every person.

The agreement was to be presented for possible approval at the next General Conference, originally scheduled for May 2020, until the COVID-19 pandemic interfered. At the date of Yambasu's death, the proposal had not yet been approved.

Bishop Yambasu was president of the Africa College of Bishops of The United Methodist Church. He had been elected Chancellor of Africa University shortly before his death. Africa University announced the establishment of an endowment for scholarships in memory of Bishop Yambasu, to support at least one student each year in the area of peace, leadership and governance.

== Personal life and death ==
John Yambasu was married to Millicent Yambasu. They have five children: Rebecca, Adima, John, Emmanuel and Elizabeth. Their daughters Adima, Rebecca, and Elizabeth as well as foster daughter Janet Kalma Thorley each earned degrees from Africa University between 2014 and 2020.

On August 16, 2020, while Bishop Yambasu was traveling to preach at the funeral of a retired colleague, an oncoming vehicle collided head-on, killing him and severely injuring his driver. The other driver, Mohamed Allie Saw, was a mechanic taking a Toyota Land Cruiser to be serviced in a garage across town, according to police reports. Saw lost control of the vehicle, which jumped the median and slammed into Yambasu's car. Saw was not injured and fled the scene, but members of the Toyota owner's family brought him to police later and he was charged with several offenses. The bishop's driver, Abdul T. Kamara, was discharged from hospital to recover at home.

== See also ==
- List of bishops of the United Methodist Church
