= State House, Sierra Leone =

The State House
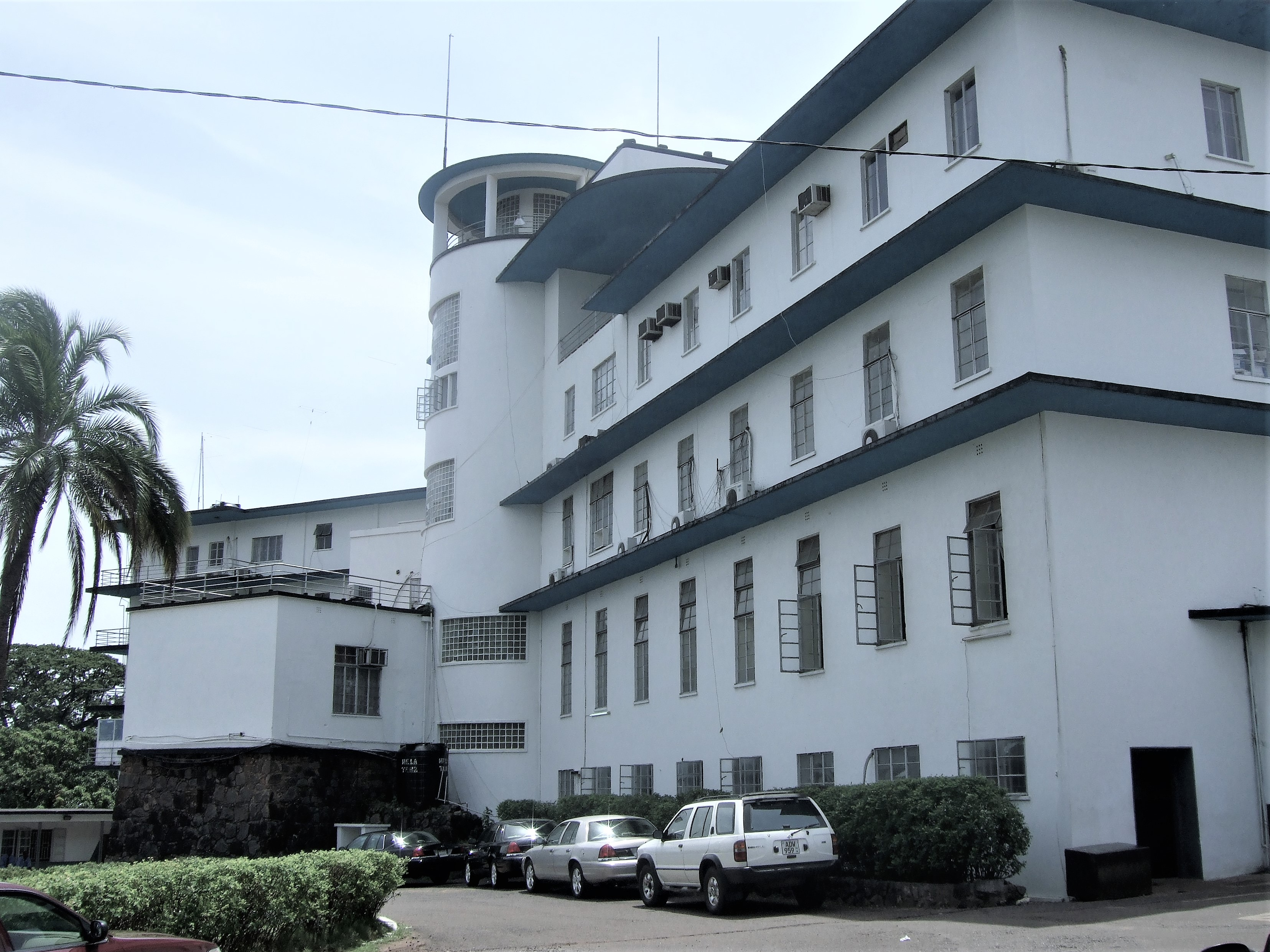

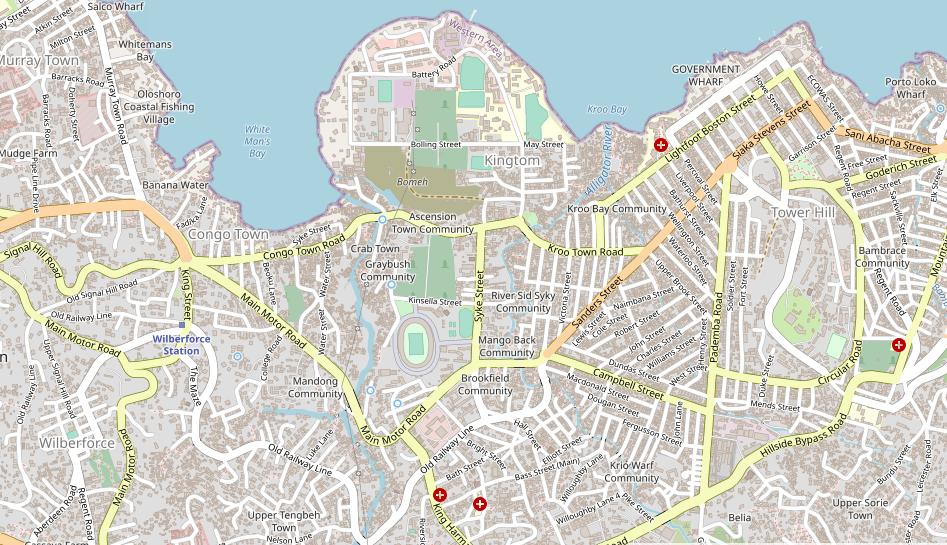
- Location within Sierra Leone Freetown Central
- Former names: Fort Thornton

General information
- Location: State Avenue, Tower Hill, Freetown, Sierra Leone
- Coordinates: 8°29′12.21″N 13°14′2.1″W
- Current tenants: Julius Maada Bio, President of Sierra Leone, First Lady Fatima Bio, and their family
- Completed: 1895 (122 years old)
- Inaugurated: 1894
- Owner: Government of Sierra Leone
- Landlord: Government of Sierra Leone

The State House is the official residence of the president of Sierra Leone. It is home to the offices of the president, senior presidential staff and associated aides. The State House is located at State Avenue, Tower Hill, in central Freetown.

== History ==
The State House is located on State Avenue, Tower Hill, in central Freetown. It stands on the site of Fort Thornton, built from ca. 1792 to 1805 and named after Henry Thornton. Inside of it was Government House, the seat of the British governor. Although it was being continually repaired and Jane Drew made alterations to it after the war, it was soon after considered "to be nearing the end of its useful life". In 1949 plans for a new Government House were presented to the public. They had been prepared by the senior architect of the Public Works Department, Robin Halliday Macartney, who was entirely responsible for the design and the construction. After several delays the building was finished in 1954 and the governor, Sir Robert Hall, moved in in February. At the express wish of the governor, "the fortification walls should be retained on account of their aesthetic and historical value." Therefore, the walls were declared National Monuments in 1949. As the old walls were of uncertain strength, "it was deemed prudent to place no great load on them". The old bastion walls can be seen from the gate.

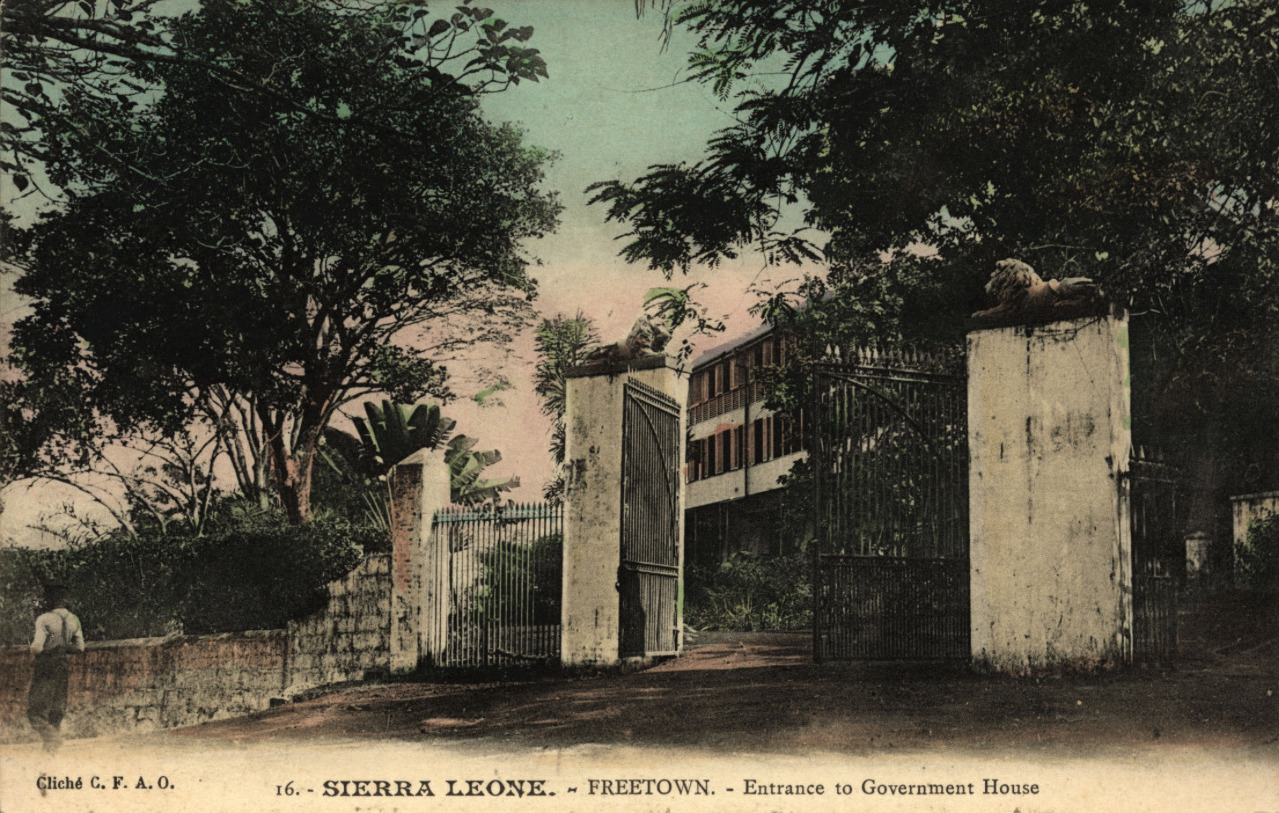
Sierra Leone, Freetown. Entrance to Government House.

The lions on the gateposts have also been taken over from the old Government House. Thus the building harmoniously combines the old and the new. It consists of "two wings pivoted on a central tower" which houses a spiral staircase with a mosaic of the world at the bottom. The two wings are asymmetrical in design, with an open facade at the front, creating a sense of lightness and buoyancy. When completed, the new Government House was one of the highest buildings in Freetown, a modern counterpart to the nearby Law Courts of 1910. From 1976 on, the State House, as it was now called, received an extension which changed the original impression. During the colonial period it was used as the residence of the governor of Sierra Leone. It was the official residence of the prime minister of Sierra Leone from 1961 to 1971, after which it became the residence of the president.

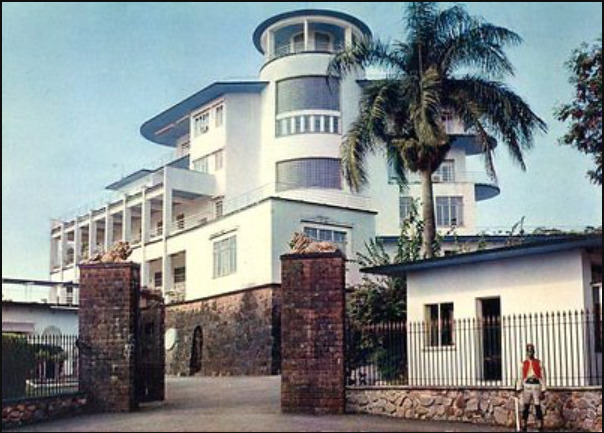
State House, Freetown, Sierra Leone

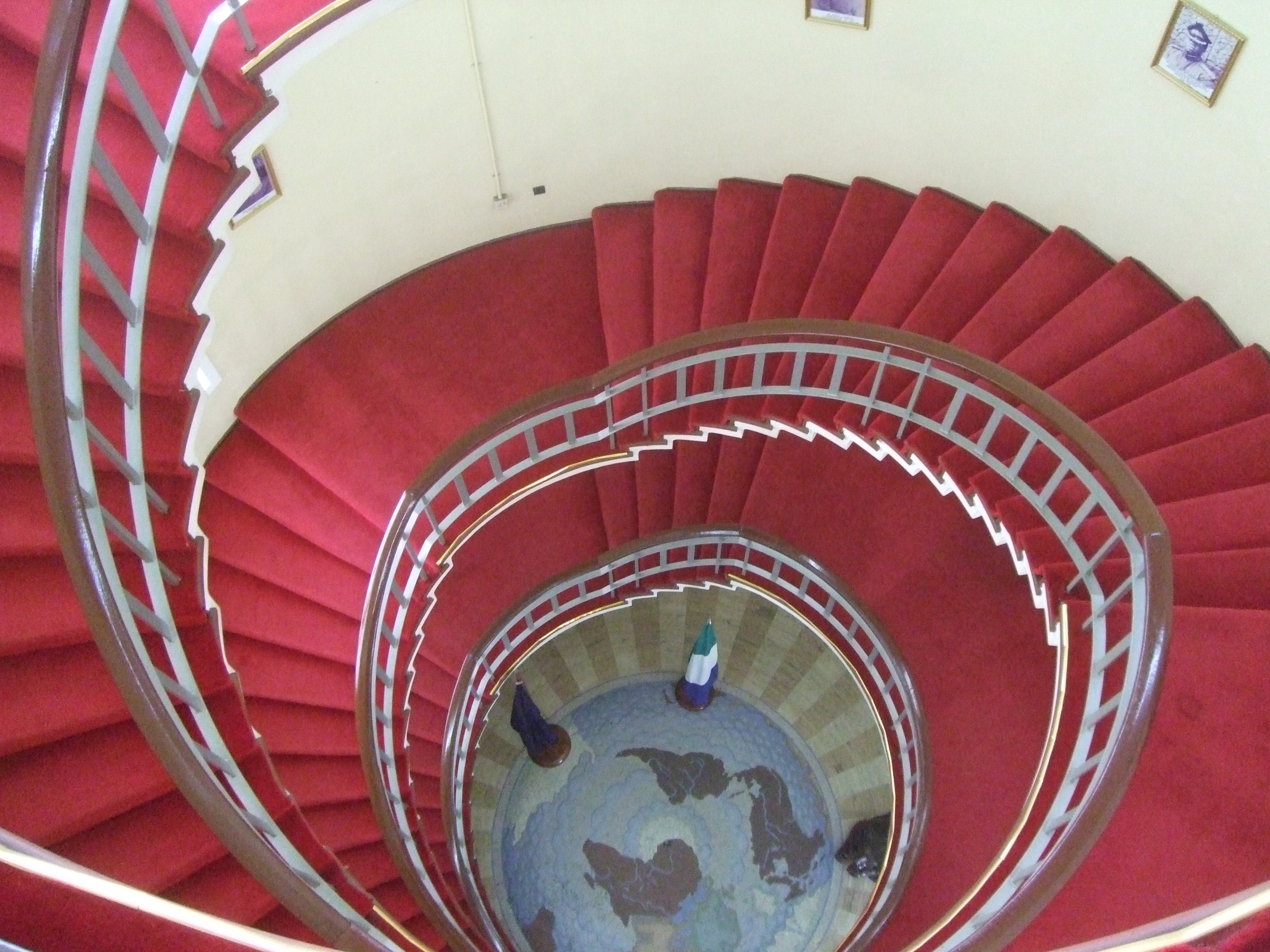
Staircase

== Security ==
As the residence of the president of Sierra Leone, the State House is constantly protected by the Presidential Guard. The guard is a special unit of the Sierra Leone Armed Forces. The Sierra Leone Police, who are responsible for road traffic control around the State House, clear traffic and assist with security when the presidential convoy moves within any part of the country.

The State House is closed to the general public, and only authorized persons and vehicles are permitted access.

== Staff ==
The president's senior staff members have offices inside the State House. These include the office of the president's chief minister, chief of staff, and the presidential press secretary. The offices of the aide de camp to the president, the Ministry of Political Affairs, the national security adviser to the president, the senior political advisors to the president, and the senior economic advisers to the president are all located with the State House.
