= Joseph Christian Humper =

Sierra Leonean bishop

Joseph Christian Humper (Sherbro Island, 2 June 1946 - Freetown, 7 May 2024) was a bishop in the United Methodist Church. He served as chair of the Truth and Reconciliation Commission in Sierra Leone. He began his service as Bishop in 1993, during the Sierra Leone Civil War, and retired in 2008. He was succeeded by John K. Yambasu.

== Sources ==
- Biography of Humper at gbgm-umc.org
