= Rebecca Stevens (first lady) =

First Lady of Sierra Leone
- In office 21 April 1971 – 28 November 1985
- Succeeded by: Hannah Momoh

Personal details
- Died: Freetown, Sierra Leone
- Party: All People's Congress (APC)
- Spouse: Siaka Stevens
- Children: 11

Rebecca Stevens served as First Lady of Sierra Leone from 21 April 1971 to 28 November 1985. She was the wife of Siaka Stevens, the 1st President of Sierra Leone.

== First Lady of Sierra Leone ==
Stevens was a quiet, unobtrusive First Lady. She accompanied her husband at public functions but rarely held events of her own.

She traveled with her husband on state visits and around the country. She resided at the family's private residence at 1 King Harman Road at Brooksfield in Freetown.

Honorary titles
| Preceded by vacant | First Lady of Sierra Leone; 1998–2007 | Succeeded by Hannah Momoh |
