= State Lodge =

Official residence of the president of Sierra Leone

The State Lodge
- Interactive map of the The State Lodge area

General information
- Location: Hill Station, Freetown, Sierra Leone
- Coordinates: 8°29′12.21″N 13°14′2.1″W
- Current tenants: Julius Maada Bio, President of Sierra Leone
- Owner: Government of Sierra Leone

The State Lodge is the official residence of the president of Sierra Leone and is located in the affluent neighborhood of Hill Station in the west end of Sierra Leone's capital Freetown. Sierra Leone's president, the first lady of Sierra Leone and their immediate family reside at the State Lodge.

== Security ==
The State Lodge is under 24 hour protection by the presidential guards, an armed unit of the Sierra Leone security forces that is made up of soldiers of the Sierra Leone Armed Forces, and police officers from the Operational Support Division of the Sierra Leone Police Force. Only permitted individuals and permitted vehicles are allowed to enter the State Lodge.
