= Patricia Kabbah =

Sierra Leonean lawyer

First Lady of Sierra Leone
- In office 1996–1998
- Preceded by: Hannah Momoh
- Succeeded by: Sia Koroma

Personal details
- Born: 17 March 1933 Gbap, Bonthe District, British Sierra Leone
- Died: 8 May 1998 (aged 65) London, England
- Spouse: Ahmad Tejan Kabbah
- Children: 5
- Education: Fourah Bay College; University of Toledo; University of Chicago
- Profession: Teacher

Patricia Kabbah (née Tucker; 17 March 1933 – 8 May 1998) was a Sierra Leonean lawyer who served as First Lady of Sierra Leone from 1996 to 1998. She was the first wife of Sierra Leone's third president, Ahmad Tejan Kabbah.

== Early life and teaching career ==
Kabbah was born on 17 March 1933 in Gbap, Bonthe District, to ethnic Sherbro parents in the Southern Province of British Sierra Leone.

She attended St. Joseph's Convent Primary School in Bonthe and St. Joseph's Convent Secondary School in Freetown. She was later employed by the Catholic Mission to teach English and French at St. Joseph's Secondary School in Freetown.

After two years of teaching, Kabbah studied in the United States and received her bachelor's degree in English at the University of Toledo, in Toledo, Ohio, in 1959 and a master's degree in French Language at the University of Chicago, in Chicago, Illinois, in 1963.

== Career ==
In 1963, she returned to Sierra Leone, where she was appointed assistant secretary in former Sierra Leone's Prime Minister Milton Margai's administration. During this time she met and married in 1965 Ahmad Tejan Kabbah, eventual president of Sierra Leone. Theirs was an interfaith union as she was a devout Catholic and her husband was Muslim. She went with Kabbah to England, where they both studied law.

She joined her husband in Lesotho, where she commenced the practice of law in the chambers of the distinguished jurist; she was the sole female attorney in the entire country. She also practised law in Tanzania and became involved in diplomatic activities such as reporting on the legal status of the African child and mother at UNICEF.

The family moved to New York City in 1981 where Mrs Kabbah obtained a Political Affairs Research appointment at the De-colonization Committee of the United Nations. She was later promoted as Head of the Executive Office, Department of Political Affairs, De-colonization of Trusteeship, with special responsibility for Budget, Personnel and General Administration. Mrs Kabbah also taught French and English at the City University of New York.

== Politics ==
The Sierra Leone Civil War started in 1991. During that time she and other lawyers Isha Dyfan and Yasmin Jusu-Sheriff and the Mano River Women's Peace Network worked to ensure that the wider international community were aware of the abuses that were taking place in Sierra Leone.

Kabbah moved back to Sierra Leone in 1995. During that time she accepted the chairmanship of the committee established to formulate plans for a return to civilian government, and to draft a new constitution.

The National Provisional Ruling Council, a military government under the leadership of Brigadier General Julius Maada Bio organized the general election in 1996, it was Sierra Leone's first general election since March 1967.

Her husband Ahmad Tejan Kabbah was nominated by the Sierra Leone People's Party (SLPP) to run for president and became the new president of Sierra Leone.

== First Lady of Sierra Leone ==
In her new capacity as First Lady of Sierra Leone, Kabbah planned to set up an office of the first lady from which she would run her own projects. However, under the influence of members of his party, her husband prevented this.

She endeavoured to use her skills as a lawyer and administrator to work with her husband but was again rebuffed by members of the male-dominated Sierra Leone People's Party who believed that the role of First Lady should remain largely symbolic.

== Death ==
Kabbah died in a London hospital just a month after she and her husband had settled in Sierra Leone.

Her husband later married Isata Jabbie.

== Legacy ==
Two schools, the Lady Patricia Kabbah Primary School in Regent, and the Lady Patricia Kabba Memorial Secondary School, was named for her in Goderich.

Honorary titles
| Preceded by Hannah Momoh | First Lady of Sierra Leone; 1996–1998 | Succeeded by Isata Jabbie Kabbah |
