= Sia Koroma =

Former First Lady of Sierra Leone

Sia Nyama Koroma
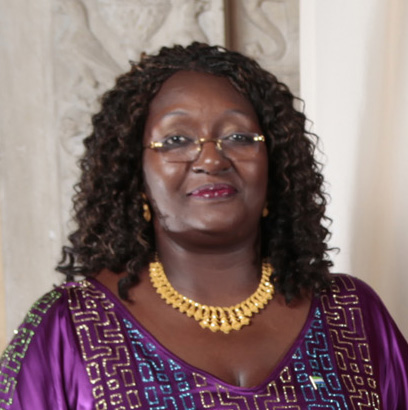

First Lady of Sierra Leone
- In role 17 September 2007 – 4 April 2018
- President: Ernest Bai Koroma
- Preceded by: Patricia Kabbah
- Succeeded by: Fatima Maada Bio

Personal details
- Born: 19 March 1958 (age 68) Kono District, British Sierra Leone
- Party: All People's Congress (APC)
- Spouse: Ernest Bai Koroma (m. 1986)
- Children: 5
- Education: The Annie Walsh Memorial Secondary School and King's College London
- Profession: Biochemist, Psychiatric Nurse
- Website: http://www.firstladysl.org (official website)

Sia Nyama Koroma (born on 19 March 1958 in Kono District, British Sierra Leone) is a Sierra Leonean biochemist and psychiatric nurse. She served as First Lady of Sierra Leone from 17 September 2007, and up until 4 April 2018. She is married to Ernest Bai Koroma, the 4th President of Sierra Leone.

Koroma was a pioneer in her role as First Lady, established the Office of the First Lady to undertake development initiatives. She focused on projects for Sierra Leonean women and children.

She is the founder of the Women's Initiative for Safer Health (WISH) project which focuses on improving reproductive health for women.

== Early life and education ==
Koroma was born on 19 March 1958 in Kono District in the Eastern Province of Sierra Leone. She is the daughter of Danke Koroma, a primary school teacher, and Abu Aiah Koroma, a lawyer and the former Attorney General of Sierra Leone. She is a member of the Kono ethnic group.

During her childhood, her father worked as the managing director of the National Diamond Mining Company (NDMC) before entering into politics. He served as Minister of Natural Resources and later as Minister of Political and Parliamentary Affairs. Her father was also a presidential candidate in the 1996 General Election. Koroma spent her early years at various primary schools around Sierra Leone as her father was being posted from one place to another.

She attended the oldest secondary school for girls in West Africa, the Annie Walsh Memorial Secondary School in Freetown, and completed her undergraduate degree in biochemistry and a Master of Science degree in Synthetic Organic Chemistry in the United Kingdom. During the 1997 interregnum in Sierra Leone, she left the country for the United Kingdom where she studied nursing at Kings College University in London and later became a Fellow of the West African College of Nursing. From 1984 to 1992 she worked as Chief Chemist at the Sierra Leone Petroleum Refinery Company, where her work included routine quality control monitoring of petroleum products in the country and sub-region.

Honorary titles
Preceded by Patricia Kabbah	First Lady of Sierra Leone; 2007–2018	Succeeded by Fatima Maada Bio; De facto
