= Fatima Bio =

First Lady of Sierra Leone since 2018

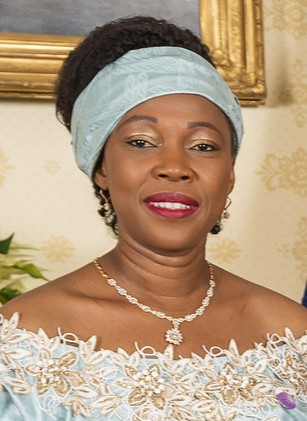
- Bio in 2022

First Lady of Sierra Leone
- Incumbent
- Assumed role 7 March 2018
- President: Julius Maada Bio
- Preceded by: Sia Koroma

Personal details
- Born: Fatima Jabbie; 27 November 1980 (age 45) Koidu Town, Sierra Leone
- Party: Sierra Leone People's Party (SLPP)
- Spouse: Julius Maada Bio (m. 2013)
- Children: 4
- Education: Roehampton Institute; London College of Communication
- Profession: Actress
- Website: official website

Fatima Maada Bio (née Jabbe; born 27 November 1980), also known as Fatima Bio or Fatima Jabbe-Bio, is a Sierra Leonean former actress, screenwriter and film producer who has served in the role of first lady of Sierra Leone, as the wife of President Julius Maada Bio since 2018.

As an actress, Bio participated in several low-budget Nollywood movie projects, as well as other acting projects in the United Kingdom. She hails from Sierra Leone's Kono District, in the southeastern part of the country; however, part of her heritage is Gambian.

== Early life and education ==
Fatima Jabbe was born in Koidu, Kono District, to Tigidankay and Umar Jabbie on 27 November 1980. Her mother is Sierra Leonean and her father is Gambian. She was raised in a Muslim family and remains a devout Muslim herself. She grew up in Kono and attended primary school at the Ansarul Islamic School. She later went to St Joseph's "Convent" Secondary School in Freetown.

She holds a Bachelor of Arts with Honours degree in Performing Art from the Roehampton Institute in London. She also earned a Bachelor of Arts degree in journalism at the University of the Arts, London College of Communication, in 2017.

== Career ==
Prior to her marriage to Maada Bio, Fatima had a career in the entertainment industry under her maiden name Fatime Jabbe. She began working in the African film industry when she was in London. She wrote, acted, and produced several low-budget Nollywood films including Battered, Shameful Deceit, Mr. Ibu in Sierra Leone, Expedition Africa, and The Soul. She starred in the film Mirror Boy and won a "Best Supporting Actress" at the 2011 ZAFAA Awards.

In 2013, she won The Pan-African "Woman of the Year Award" from All African Media. And In 2013, she earned a Best Female Actress at the African Oscars in Washington, DC. The same year, she won the Gathering of African Best (GAB) Awards for promoting a positive view of Africans around the world.

== First Lady ==
Bio became the First Lady of Sierra Leone on 7 March 2018.

In June 2026, Bio received international press attention after she refused to condemn female genital mutilation until she saw "reliable data" that it was harmful. In response, a group of health professionals wrote an open letter to the Organisation of African First Ladies for Development, expressing its "concerns" that "perceptions" that Bio supported the practice could lead to the "undermining of years of advocacy".

== Charity ==
Bio is a patron of a number of charities in the UK, including the John Utaka Foundation, which helps African children and young people cope with health challenges.

== Marriage and family ==
Before Fatima married Bio in 2013, she had previously been married to a footballer with whom she had two children (Mohamed and Tida). She and Bio were married in a private ceremony in London on 25 October 2013. On 27 June 2014, she gave birth to a son, Hamza Maada Bio who died three days later. On 7 September 2015, a year after losing their son, she gave birth to their daughter, Amina.

== Real estate controversies ==
In May 2024, an investigation by the Organized Crime and Corruption Reporting Project (OCCRP) revealed that since President Julius Maada Bio took office in 2018, Fatima Bio and several members of her family acquired at least ten properties in The Gambia, valued at over US$2.1 million. These included villas, apartment buildings, and other real estate in coastal and resort areas. Some of the properties were registered in the name of Bio’s mother, while others were owned directly by the First Lady herself. The OCCRP reported that it was unable to identify a clear source of funds for these acquisitions, and noted that at least three property transactions were facilitated by Alphonso Lakhmee King, a businessman who had received government contracts in Sierra Leone.

That same month, The Times reported that Fatima Bio continued to be listed as a tenant of a council flat in Southwark, south London, despite residing in the presidential lodge in Freetown. Records showed that she had been registered to vote at the London address multiple times between 2009 and 2022, and the tenancy—first established in 2007—had remained in her name. Council flats in the United Kingdom are intended for residents in need of social housing, and regulations typically require the property to be the tenant’s primary residence. The council later confirmed that it had taken back possession of the flat following a 12-month investigation.

Honorary titles
Preceded by Sia Koroma	First Lady of Sierra Leone; 2018–present	Incumbent
