= Sierra Leone Police =

- Common name: Salone Police
- Abbreviation: SLP
- Motto: A Force for Good

Agency overview
- Formed: 1894

Jurisdictional structure
- Operations jurisdiction: Sierra Leone
- Map of Sierra Leone Police's jurisdiction
- Legal jurisdiction: Sierra Leone
- Governing body: Government of Sierra Leone

Operational structure
- Headquarters: George Street, Freetown, Sierra Leone
- Officers: 12,500
- Agency executive: Ambrose Sovula, Inspector General of Police
- Parent agency: Sierra Leone Ministry of Internal Affairs

Website
- https://www.police.gov.sl/ http://www.police.sl

The Sierra Leone Police (SLP) is the national police force of the Republic of Sierra Leone. It is primarily responsible for law enforcement and crime investigation throughout Sierra Leone. The Sierra Leone Police is under the jurisdiction of the Sierra Leone Ministry of Internal Affairs, a cabinet ministry in the Government of Sierra Leone.

The Sierra Leone Police is headed by the Inspector General of Police (IGP), who is appointed by the President of Sierra Leone and confirmed by the Sierra Leone Parliament. The president has the constitutional authority to fire the Inspector General of Police at any time.

The current Inspector General of the Sierra Leone Police is William Fayia Sellu who was appointed by president Julius Madda Bio on 27 July 2022 to replace Ambrose Sovula, who had been in the post since March 2020.

The Sierra Leone Police was established by the British colony in 1894 and is one of the oldest police forces in West Africa.

== Mission ==
The key missions of the Sierra Leone Police include preventing crime, protecting life and property, detecting and prosecuting offenders, maintaining public order, ensuring safety and security, enhancing access to justice, and ensuring police primacy for internal security and safety.

== History ==
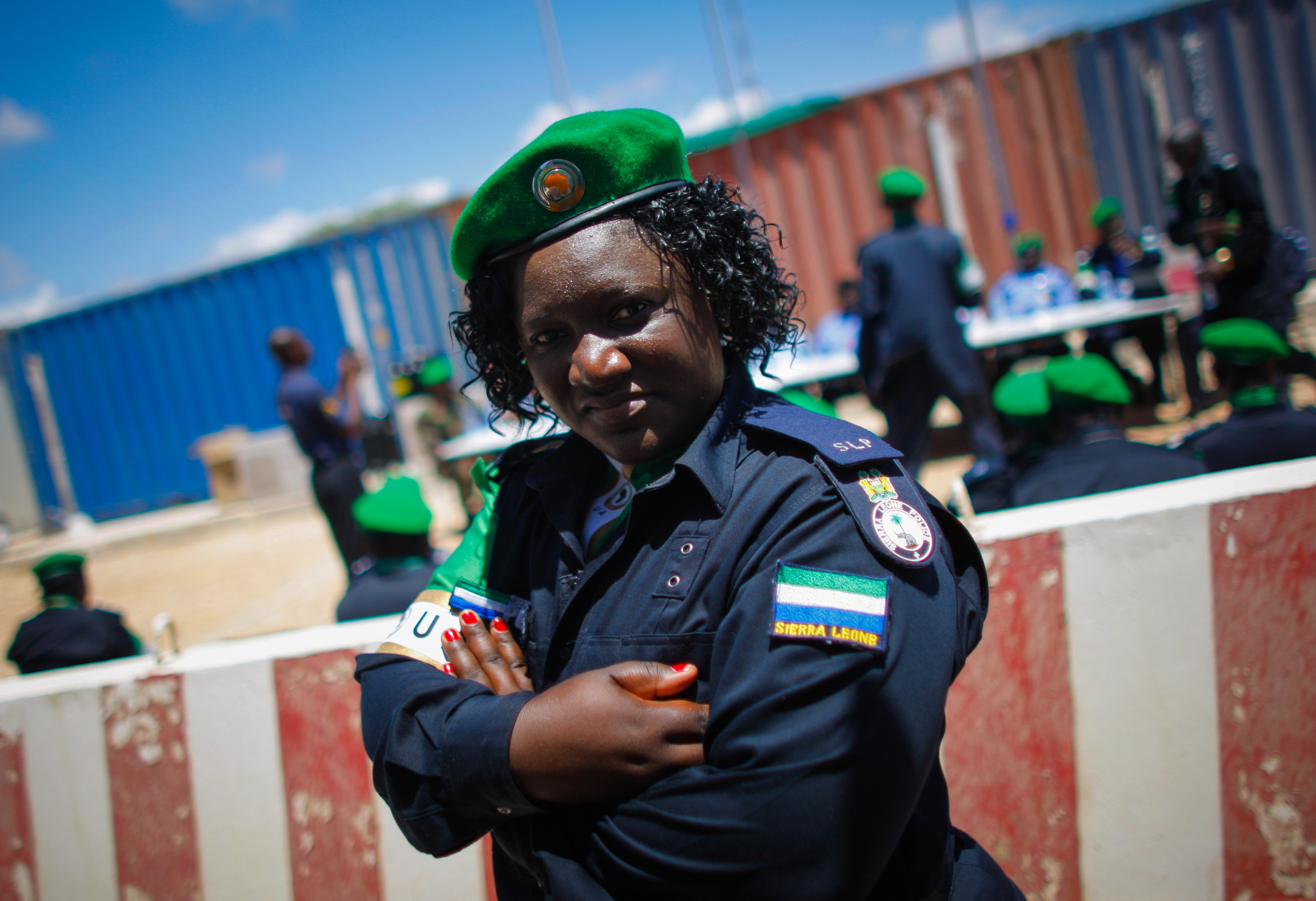
A Sierra Leone Police officer of the AMISOM police contingent in Mogadishu.

The Colony of Freetown was set up in 1808 as a settlement for freed slaves, with a police force whose authority was restricted solely to the city limits of the colony itself. By 1889 colonial authority had been extended to the provinces. Police authority was also extended to these areas and performed largely paramilitary duties as opposed to the civil police back in the colony. The force at this point became known as the West African Frontier Force.

A Royal Gazette of October 1894 established the Sierra Leone Police Force. Following independence in April 1961, the Sierra Leone Parliament passed the Police Act of 1964 to consolidate and amend the law relating to the organization, discipline, powers and duties of the Sierra Leone Police.

Efforts were made during the initial post-conflict police reform process to increase the number of women in the police. However, during visits, it was found that newly recruited women police officers were sometimes expected to do little more than cook lunch for their male colleagues.

== Organisation ==
The Sierra Leone Police is headed by The Inspector General of Police (IG), the professional head of the Sierra Leone Police forces who is appointed by the President of Sierra Leone, however in terms defining the line of authority, the IG is accountable to the Minister of Internal Affairs first (also appointed by the President). The current Inspector General is Ambrose Sovula. The Deputy Inspector General of Police is Elizabeth Turay.

At the national command level, There are 16 Assistant Inspector Generals of Police (AIG) with responsibility for Operations, Human Resources; Training; Medical Services; Crime Services; Support Services; Professional Standards; Corporate Affairs; Peacekeeping; Gender Affairs; Community Affairs; Traffic Management; Intelligence; Presidential Guard; Infrastructure and the Operational Support Division (OSD), (the armed wing of the SLP). Regional commanders known as Regpols who are also AIGs carry regional responsibilities for the Freetown West Area, Freetown East Area, North East Area, North West Area, Southern Province and Eastern Province. All of these AIGs assist the IGP and the DIG in the running of the day-to-day affairs of the SLP. This is done through a joined up leadership approach practicalised into an Executive Management Board, the highest policy making body in the organisation which meets once every week under the chairmanship of the IGP.

== Working in partnership ==
The International Security Advisory Team (ISAT) based in Freetown (UK advisers to the Police, Military and Government of Sierra Leone) currently has two UK Police Officers working with the SLP in order to work together to enhance professionalism within the Sierra Leone Police, to improve Public Safety and build Community Confidence.

An 18-month programme delivering officer safety training, public order command training at Gold, Silver and Bronze level, and tactical public order training, was completed and the Sierras Leone Police are now able to continue training themselves in these skills and have so far trained a further 1000 officers without external assistance. (March 2018)

Community policing projects are being rolled out across Sierra Leone, having had a proof of concept in Kambia District, it was extended to Kailahun in the Eastern region, this has been running for a year and has proved very successful. Due to this Kenema also benefitted from the program and it is anticipated it will be country wide within the next 2 years.

Leadership training is now underway across the middle management including the National Decision Model, Threat and Risk assessments and Human Rights issue.

ISAT sponsored three female officers to undergo a gender awareness and sensitivity "train the trainer" program and a 2-day conference was hosted to build gender awareness across the security sector. Participants came from Sierra Leone Police, Republic of Sierra Leone Armed Forces, National Fire Force, Correction Services, Office of National Security and Road Safety Authority.

== Regions ==
Each one of Sierra Leone's 12 administrative districts has its own District Police Unit, which is a sub department of each Regional Police Command, whilst there are four administrative regions of Sierra Leone, there are 6 Police Regions. Each one of Sierra Leone's twelve administrative districts is headed by a local unit commander, who are subordinate to the regional police commanders. The capital Freetown is part of the Western Area police division but is split into two, each being led by an Assistant Inspector General.

=== Departments ===
The Sierra Leone Police is divided into the following departments:

- Criminal Investigation Department (CID) is primarily responsible for investigating major crimes
- Operational Support Division (OSD) this unit supports the general duties police and is trained to perform high-risk duties including to control riots, and violence protest. OSD had an establishment of seven rifle companies, and was described as 'in many ways' [the OSD is infantry, like the army]. It was composed of 3,055 officers in 2007.
- Traffic police Unit primarily responsible for enforcing traffic safety and control the movement of traffic in all highways and major traffic crossings across Sierra Leone.
- Media and Public Relation Unit responsible for the collection and release of police activities to the public and media.
- Legal and Justice Department responsible of prosecuting civil and criminal cases to court.
- Human Resource Department deals with the welfare, salaries, employments, promotions, benefits and transfers of police officers.
- Community Relations Department (CRD) established to build a working relationship between the police and the public.
- Complaint Discipline Internal Investigation Department (CDID) They receive confidential complaints from public on police activities, and police misconduct.
- Precious Mineral Department responsible of protecting and investigating all act related to the country's mineral resources. They work closely with the Sierra Leone ministry of mines and natural resources.
- Interpol Department investigate criminal affairs link to other countries.
- Family Support Unit (FSU) handles domestic and family issues.

=== Police Divisions and Leadership ===
Sierra Leone Police Division	SLP Local Unit Commander(LUC)
Inspector General of Police	William Fayia Sellu
Deputy Inspector General of Police	Elizabeth A Turay
SLP Director of Operations	Assistant Inspector General Elizabeth A. Turay
SLP Director of Human Resource Management	Assistant Inspector General Jorwular Gbonnoh
SLP Director of Gender Services	Assistant Inspector General Mustapha Kamara
SLP Director of Operational Support Division	Assistant Inspector General Francis Moses Tower
SLP Director of Corporate Affairs	Assistant Inspector General Mumunata Konteh-Jalloh
SLP Director of Internal Audit	Chief Superintendent Edward Conteh
SLP Director of Traffic Division	Assistant Inspector General Sahr Senesie
SLP Director of Training	Assistant Inspector General Sahr Marka
SLP Director of Support Services	Assistant Inspector General Patrick Johnson
SLP Director of Peacekeeping	Assistant Inspector General Gloria O. V Tarawallie
SLP Director of Crime Services	Assistant Inspector General Mohamed Brima Jah
SLP Director of Infrastructure	Assistant Inspector General Ibrahim Quorum
SLP Director of Integrated Intelligence Services	Assistant Inspector General Saidu Jalloh
SLP Director of Professional Standards and Moral Affairs	Assistant Inspector General Samuel Tarawally
SLP Director of Medical Services	Assistant Inspector General Dr Mohamed Jalloh
SLP Director of Presidential Guard	Assistant Inspector General William Sellu
SLP Regional Commander Of the Freetown Western Area	Assistant Inspector General Thomas Lahai
SLP Regional Commander of the Freetown Eastern Area	Assistant Inspector General Frank Alpha
SLP Regional Commander of the Southern Province Police Division	Assistant Inspector General Kapri Kamara
SLP Regional Commander of the Eastern Province Police Division	Assistant Inspector General Francis Bundor
SLP Regional Commander of the North Eastern Province, Sierra Leone Police Division	Assistant Inspector General Jorwular Gbonnoh
SLP Regional Commander of the North Western Province, Sierra Leone Police Division	Assistant Inspector General Ambrose Sovula

== Sources and external links ==
- http://news.sl/drwebsite/publish/article_200517877.shtml
- http://www.awoko.org/2011/07/27/civil-society-celebrates-international-day-of-justice/
- http://www.awoko.org/2011/05/17/kamboi-eagles-defeat-ports-authority-2-1/
- https://web.archive.org/web/20120404142527/http://www.sierraexpressmedia.com/archives/9771
- https://web.archive.org/web/20120324195647/http://www.freetowndailynews.com/north%20-%20Copy%20-7%20-%20Copy.html
- http://news.sl/drwebsite/publish/printer_200518654.shtml
- http://www.thetorchlight.com/index.php?option=com_content&view=article&id=986:kambia-police-to-*curb-illegal-crossing-points&catid=1:latest-news&Itemid=27
- https://web.archive.org/web/20120404142550/http://www.sierraexpressmedia.com/archives/3258
- http://news.sl/drwebsite/publish/article_200518521.shtml
- http://www.awoko.org/2010/05/10/police-deployed-to-s-l-liberia-border-to-avert-security-threat/
- http://news.sl/drwebsite/exec/view.cgi?archive=5&num=9121&printer=1
- Police Homepage
