= President of Sierra Leone =

Head of state and government

President of the Republic of Sierra Leone
- Presidential standard

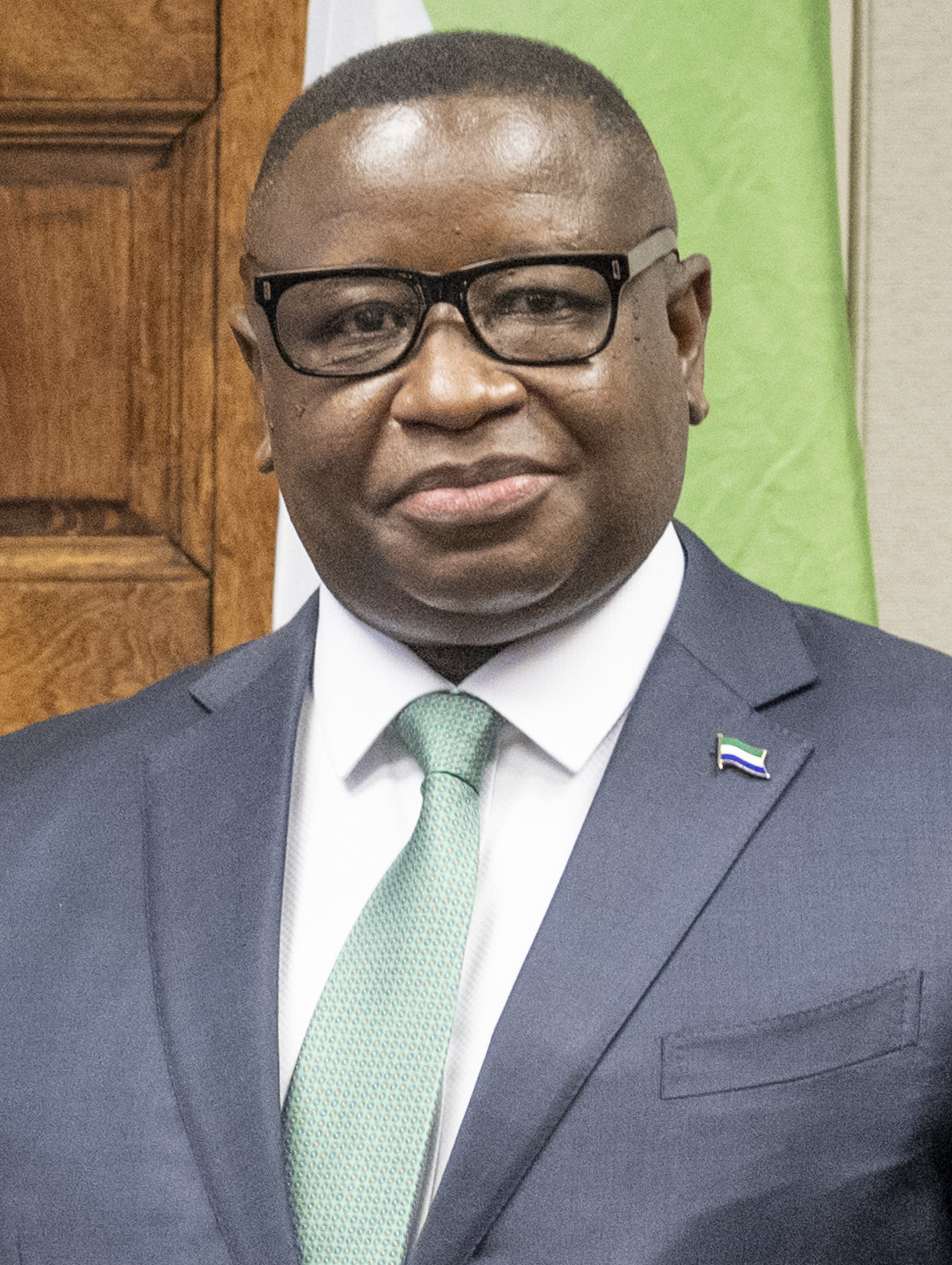
- Incumbent; Julius Maada Wonie Bio since 4 April 2018
- Style: His/Her Excellency
- Residence: State House (official workplace); State Lodge (official residence)
- Term length: Five years, renewable once
- Constituting instrument: Constitution of Sierra Leone (1991)
- Precursor: Queen of Sierra Leone
- Formation: 19 April 1971; 55 years ago
- First holder: Christopher Okoro Cole (acting)
- Deputy: Vice President of Sierra Leone
- Salary: 12,220 USD annually
- Website: http://www.statehouse.gov.sl/

The president of the Republic of Sierra Leone is the head of state and the head of government of Sierra Leone, as well as the commander-in-chief of the Armed Forces.

As the head of the executive branch of the Sierra Leone government, the president implements laws passed by parliament. The president has influence especially over members of the party of the president in the legislative branch of Parliament. The president constitutionally appoints judges of the Sierra Leone Judicial branch, including judges of the high court, the court of appeals and the Supreme Court. The president heads a Cabinet of ministers, which must be approved by the Parliament. The president is the most powerful, and the most influential person in the Government of Sierra Leone. The president of Sierra Leone is formally addressed as His Excellency.

== Eligibility for the office ==
- above 32 years of age
- Sierra Leone citizen
- Active membership in political party
- Fulfills all other requirements to serve in parliament

== Vacancy in the office ==
The Sierra Leone President's Office will become vacant if

- The president serves over two five-year terms
- Current officeholder dies or retires from office
- President participates in misconduct or is physically or mentally unable to complete the duties of the presidency

During times of war, a president's term may be extended beyond the pre-determined two five-year terms, but only in increments in half a year at any one time

Resignations or retirements from the office of the presidency must be given in writing. Written resignations will be given to the Chief Justice. A copy of the resignation will be given to the Speaker and Chief Electoral Commissioner.

Any factors resulting in vacancy of presidency will result in vice-president taking on duties of the presidency and finishing out the affected president's term. Prior to beginning duties of the presidency, the vice-president shall take the proper oath as outlined in the Constitution of Sierra Leone.

The president of Sierra Leone is automatically: (Source: https://statehouse.gov.sl/)

- Head of state
- Head of Executive branch
- Head of Armed Forces
- Head of Cabinet with Parliament approval

His address is known to be “His Excellency” and is a partnered appointee of Parliament.

== Election ==
The election is through a cycle of 5 consecutive years/terms. The president is elected by an absolute majority vote and has two different rounds in which he is elected through, but has to be met with a certain step by step criteria:

- Appointed by his own political party
- All voters and appointees be registered in Sierra Leone
- Polls be taken on secret ballot at specific date and time by Parliament
- Must result in one nomination of presidency
- If nominee passes, party organizers have seven days exactly to nominate runner up
- The poll majority must reach a 55% approval rating
- If tied, the default of the election winner shall go to a second-round election within fourteen days.

The president's election must take place during the state of his office, in which the former's would be expired following a three-month period.

As of 2021, there is a two-term limit for the president in the Constitution of Sierra Leone. The first president for whom the term limits applied was Kabbah in 2007.

== Benefits and annual pay ==
According to the Sierra Leone Constitution, the president receives entitlement and compensation salary within the office he upholds such as:

- Receiving a salary and allowance as prescribed by Parliament and charged on a Consolidated Fund
- Salary and allowances cannot be altered to a disadvantage or advantage
- Exempted of personal taxes
- Cannot be criminal charged while in office
- Entitled to pension and retirement benefits prescribed by Parliament

== Administrative powers ==
- With advice from the Judicial and Legal Service Commission, the president is able to appoint the members of the Judicature such as the Supreme Court's chief justice
- The president appoints the Ministers of State that make up the cabinet if they have been approved by the parliament
- The president has the power to appoint numerous members of the government such as the members of the Judicature including the Supreme Court's Chief Justice as well as other judges that make up the Judicature with the advisement of the advice of the Judicial and Legal Service Commission, and the Ministers of State. Though the president is able to appoint these positions, those appointed will still need to be approved by the parliament in order to hold those positions.

== Residence ==
The President of Sierra Leone official and principal workplace is at State House, located in Tower Hill in central Freetown, the capital of Sierra Leone.

The president of Sierra Leone has two official residences. The first is at State Lodge, located in the affluent neighborhood of Hill Station in the west end of Freetown; the second is at Kabassa Lodge, located in the affluent neighborhood of Juba Hill in the west end of Freetown.

The current president Julius Maada Wonie Bio uses the State Lodge at Hill Station as his official residence. The former president of Sierra Leone Ahmad Tejan Kabbah used State Lodge as his residence. Former Sierra Leone presidents Joseph Saidu Momoh and Siaka Stevens used the Kabassa Lodge at Juba Hill as their official residence.

== Security and protection ==
The president of Sierra Leone is heavily guarded by the Presidential Guard, which is made up of a special unit of soldiers of the Sierra Leone Armed Forces and a special unit of police officers of the Operational Support Division of the Sierra Leone Police Force.

== Presidential constitutional history ==
Siaska Stevens was representing the All People's Congress (APC) party in 1967 when he won the general elections and became the Prime Minister. In 1971, the parliamentary system was abolished in favor of a presidential system. This adoption of a new constitution made Siaska Stevens the first executive President of Sierra Leone.

Eventually, the APC would become the only recognized political party in the country. In 1978, a new constitution was adopted via referendum. This constitution replaced the multi-party system, instituting a single party state. Additionally, executive powers were increased and the presidential term limits increased from four to seven years.

In October 1990, President Momoh appointed a thirty-five member National Constitutional Review Commission. This was in response to the growing opposition of a one-party state. The review commission recommends constitutional changes, providing alternatives to the one-party state.

== See also ==
- List of colonial governors of Sierra Leone
- List of heads of state of Sierra Leone
- List of heads of government of Sierra Leone
