= Ishikari Bay =

Bay located in Hokkaido island of Japan

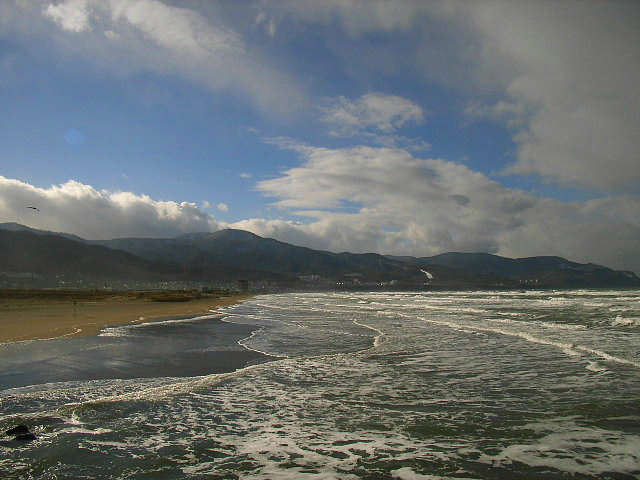
- Ishikari Bay from a beach in Otaru

- Location within Hokkaido
- Coordinates: 43°20′N 141°7′E
- River sources: Ishikari, Shinkawa, Hoshioki
- Ocean/sea sources: Sea of Japan
- Basin countries: Japan
- Max. depth: 500 m (1,640 ft)
- Settlements: Otaru, Ishikari, Shakotan, Furubira, Yoichi

Ishikari Bay (石狩湾, Ishikari-wan) is a bay located in Hokkaido of Japan, connected to the Sea of Japan. Ishikari Bay is the area east of the straight line from Cape Shakotan on the west of Shakotan Peninsula to Cape Ofuyu.

== Geography ==
=== Border communities ===
Shiribeshi Subprefecture
Otaru, Shakotan, Furubira, Yoichi
Ishikari Subprefecture
Ishikari

=== Rivers ===
Ishikari, Shinkawa, Hoshioki, etc.

== Development ==
=== Ports ===
In Hokkaido, important ports are located in Ishikari Bay. The New Port of Ishikari Bay and the Port of Otaru.

=== Renewable power generation ===
In addition to a small array of onshore wind turbines, in late 2023 the New Port became host to the Ishikari Bay New Port Offshore Wind Farm, at the time the largest offshore wind farm in Japan.
