= Shakotan =

Shakotan may refer to:

- Shakotan, Hokkaidō
- Shakotan District, Hokkaidō
- Shakotan Peninsula
- Shakotan (シャコタン), a type of modified car associated with the bōsōzoku subculture
