= Niseko-Shakotan-Otaru Kaigan Quasi-National Park =

Quasi-national park in the Shiribeshi Subprefecture of Hokkaido, Japan

- ニセコ積丹小樽海岸国定公園
- IUCN category V (protected landscape/seascape)
- Location within Japan
- Location: Hokkaido, Japan
- Nearest city: Furubira, Iwanai, Kamoenai, Kutchan, Kyōwa, Niseko, Otaru, Rankoshi, Shakotan, Tomari, Yoichi
- Coordinates: 42°53′28″N 140°33′6″E
- Area: 190.09 square kilometres (73.39 mi^{2})
- Established: July 24, 1963

Niseko-Shakotan-Otaru Kaigan Quasi-National Park (ニセコ積丹小樽海岸国定公園, Niseko-Shakotan-Otaru Kaigan Kokutei Kōen) is a quasi-national park in the Shiribeshi Subprefecture of Hokkaido, Japan. On the coast of the Sea of Japan, there is a Marine Protected Area covering the west and north coast of Shakotan peninsula from Kamoenai to Otaru. The park also protects the area around the Mount Raiden and Niseko Volcanic Groups. Niseko-Shakotan-Otaru Kaigan Quasi-National Park was established in 1963.

According to the World Database on Protected Areas, this park protects the following species:

- Prunus sargentii, a species of cherry tree
- Carcinactis ichikawai, a species of sea anemone
- Carcharodon carcharias, a species of shark
- Aptocyclus ventricosus, a species of lumpsucker
- Haliclyctus tenuis, species of true jellyfish
- Finella sp., a species of mollusk

== See also ==
- List of national parks of Japan
