= Cape Kamui =

Headland in Japan

Cape Kamui 神威岬 (Kamui misaki)
- Cape
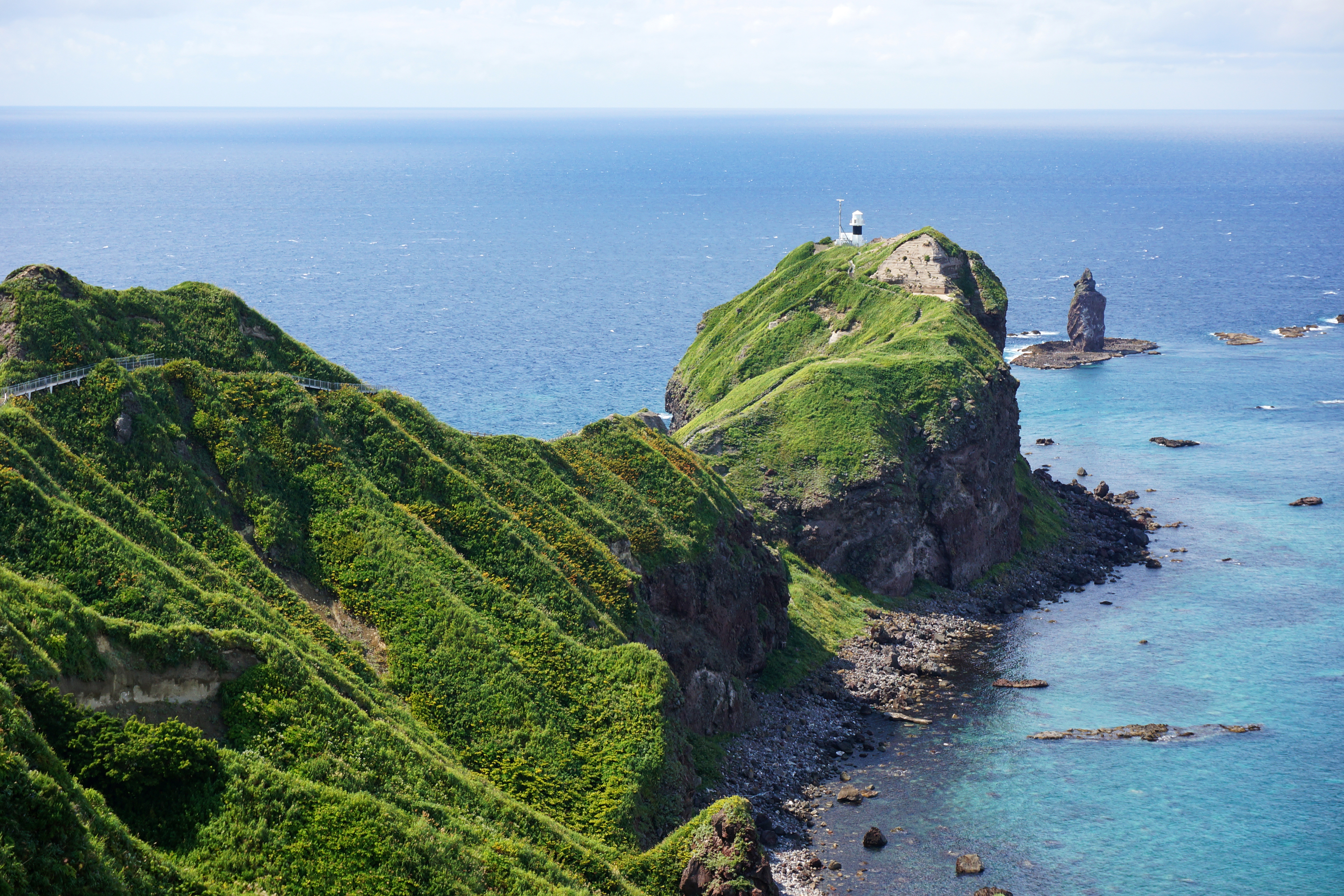
- Cape Kamui on the Shakotan Peninsula

- Coordinates: 43°19′48.35″N 140°21′12.51″E
- Location: Hokkaido, Japan
- Offshore water bodies: Sea of Japan

Cape Kamui (神威岬, Kamui misaki) is located on the western part of Shakotan, Hokkaido, Japan. Its lighthouse, the Cape Kamui Lighthouse, overlooks the Sea of Japan. An earthquake off the cape on 2 August 1940 resulted in a tsunami that killed ten people.

== Gallery ==
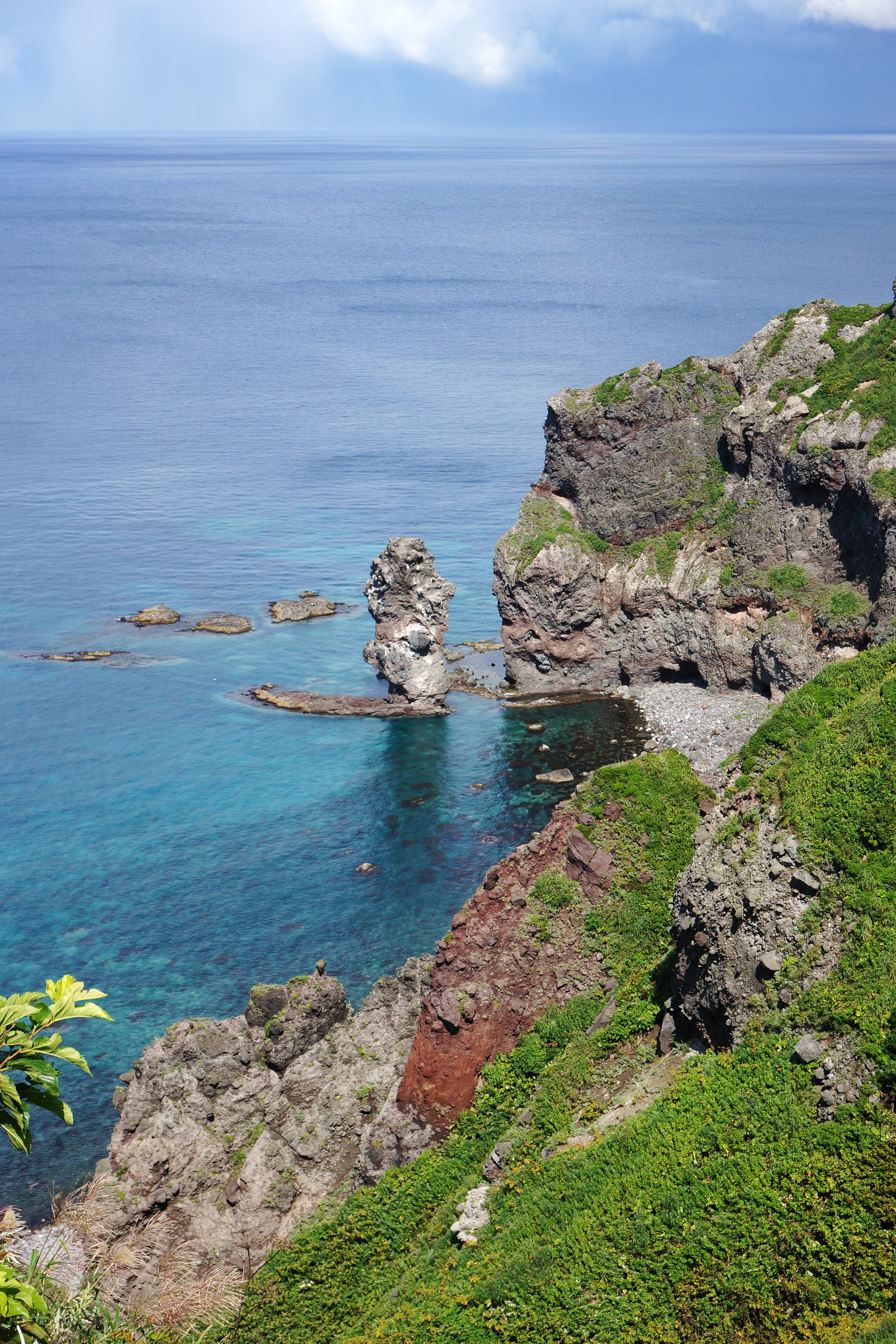
East bank

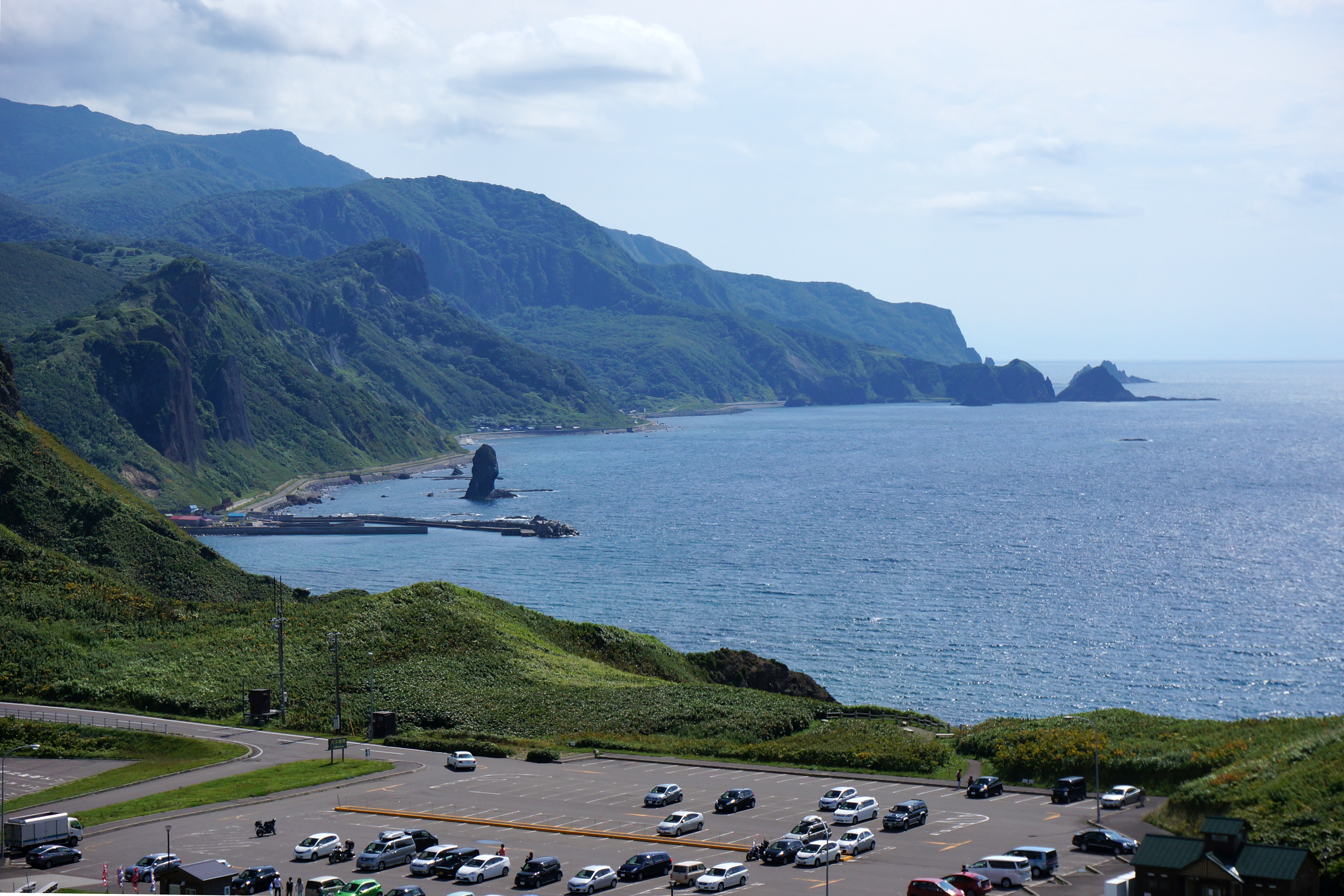
West bank

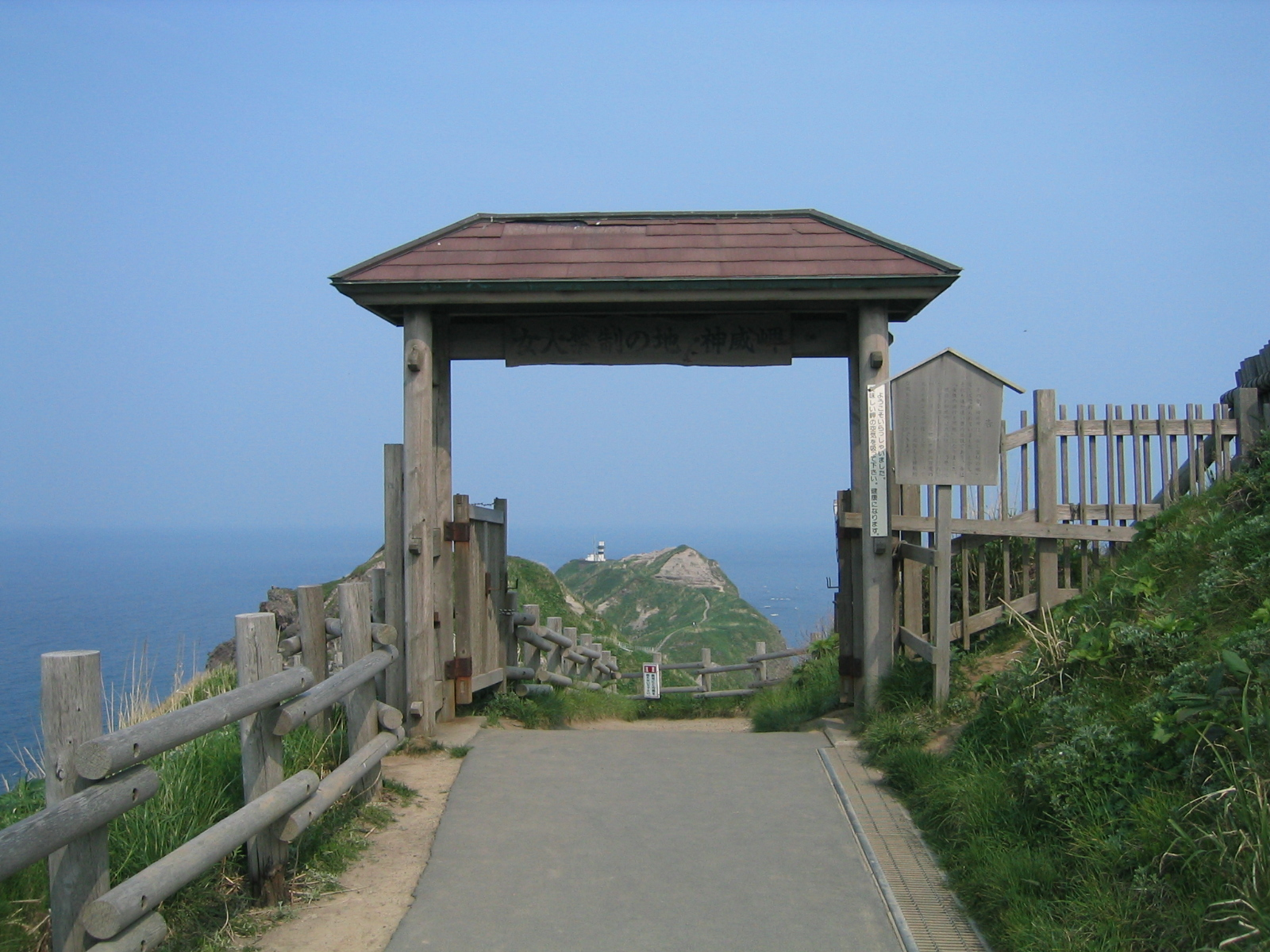
Entrance

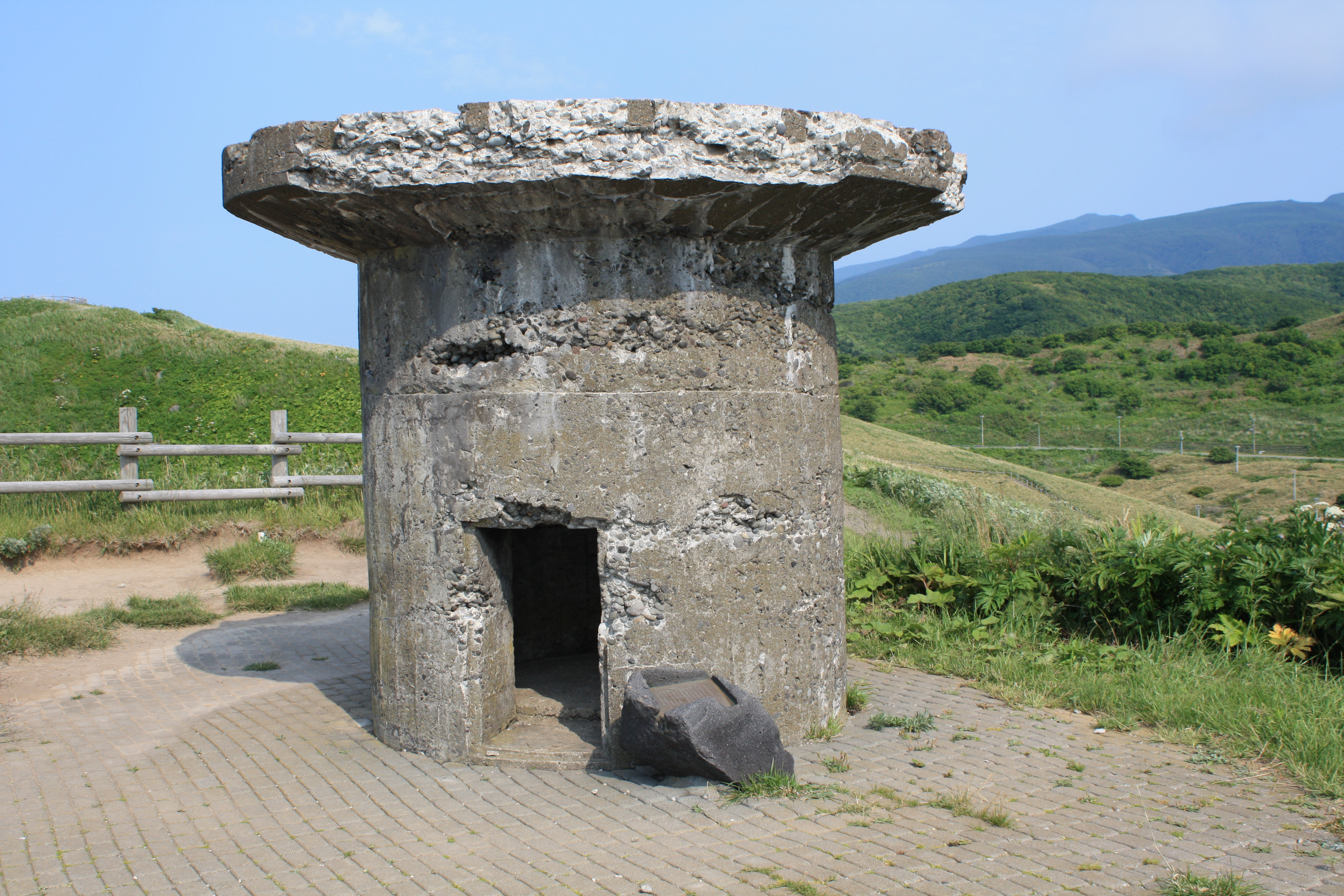
Radio tower

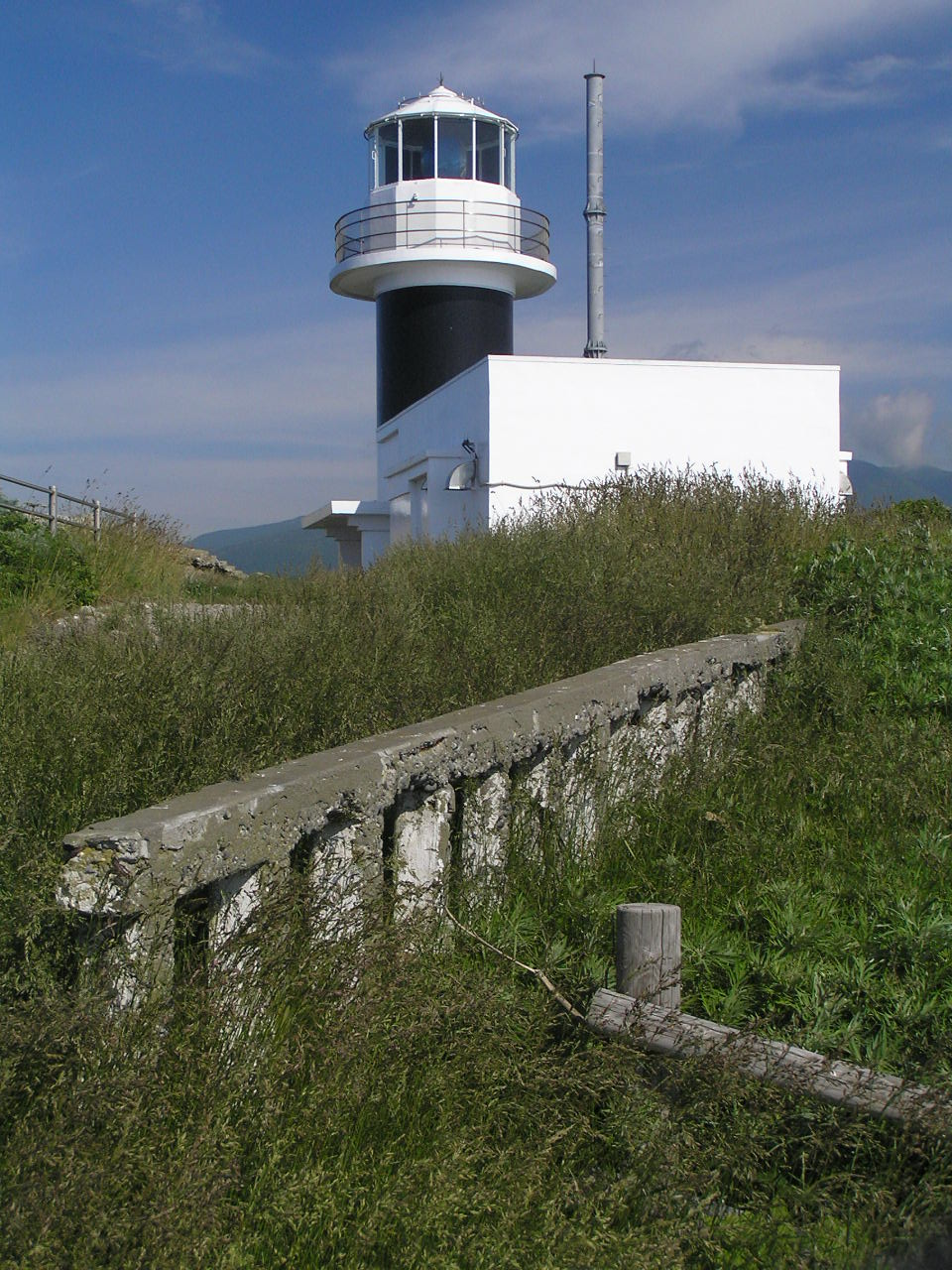
Cape Kamui Lighthouse

== See also ==
- Niseko-Shakotan-Otaru Kaigan Quasi-National Park
