= Kyōwa, Hokkaido =

Kyōwa 共和町
- Town
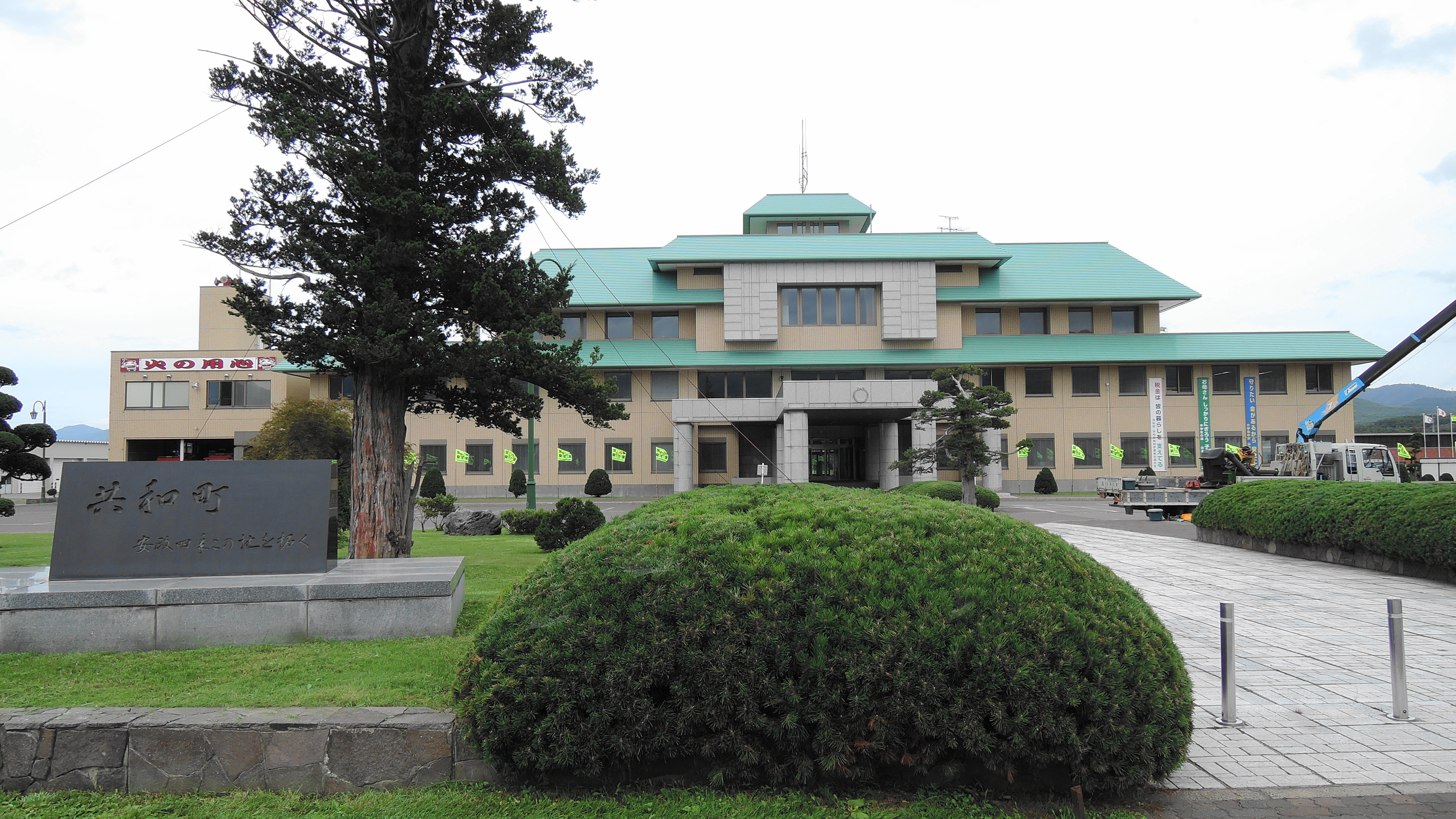
- Kyōwa Town hall

- Flag Emblem

- Location of Kyōwa in Hokkaido (Shiribeshi Subprefecture)

- Location in Japan
- Coordinates: 42°59′N 140°37′E
- Country: Japan
- Region: Hokkaido
- Prefecture: Hokkaido (Shiribeshi Subprefecture)
- District: Iwanai

Government
  - Mayor: Eiji Yamamoto

Area
  - Total: 304.96 km^{2} (117.75 sq mi)

Population (September 30, 2016)
  - Total: 6,136
  - Density: 20.12/km^{2} (52.11/sq mi)
- Time zone: UTC+09:00 (JST)
- City hall address: 38-2 Minamihoroni, Kyōwa, Iwanai-gun, Hokkaido; 048-2292
- Climate: Dfb
- Website: www.town.kyowa.hokkaido.jp
- Symbols
- Flower: Menyanthes
- Tree: Taxus cuspidata

Kyōwa (共和町, Kyōwa-chō) is a town located in Shiribeshi Subprefecture, Hokkaido, Japan.

As of September 2016, the town has an estimated population of 6,136, and a density of 20 persons per km^{2}. The total area is 304.96 km^{2}.

== Geography ==
Kyōwa is located just south of the Shakotan Peninsula, near the Niseko Volcanic Group.

=== Neighboring towns and village ===
- Furubira
- Iwanai
- Kutchan
- Niki
- Rankoshi
- Tomari

=== Climate ===
Climate data for Kyōwa (1991−2020 normals, extremes 1977−present)
Month	Jan	Feb	Mar	Apr	May	Jun	Jul	Aug	Sep	Oct	Nov	Dec	Year
Record high °C (°F)	9.4 (48.9)	13.6 (56.5)	16.3 (61.3)	24.6 (76.3)	30.0 (86.0)	32.5 (90.5)	34.7 (94.5)	35.0 (95.0)	33.4 (92.1)	25.2 (77.4)	21.2 (70.2)	15.3 (59.5)	35.0 (95.0)
Mean daily maximum °C (°F)	−0.5 (31.1)	0.1 (32.2)	3.8 (38.8)	10.6 (51.1)	16.5 (61.7)	20.5 (68.9)	24.5 (76.1)	25.9 (78.6)	22.5 (72.5)	15.8 (60.4)	8.4 (47.1)	1.8 (35.2)	12.5 (54.5)
Daily mean °C (°F)	−3.4 (25.9)	−3.0 (26.6)	0.5 (32.9)	6.3 (43.3)	11.8 (53.2)	16.0 (60.8)	20.1 (68.2)	21.4 (70.5)	17.5 (63.5)	11.2 (52.2)	4.8 (40.6)	−1.1 (30.0)	8.5 (47.3)
Mean daily minimum °C (°F)	−6.8 (19.8)	−6.7 (19.9)	−3.4 (25.9)	1.7 (35.1)	7.0 (44.6)	11.9 (53.4)	16.4 (61.5)	17.4 (63.3)	12.8 (55.0)	6.6 (43.9)	1.2 (34.2)	−4.2 (24.4)	4.5 (40.1)
Record low °C (°F)	−17.8 (0.0)	−17.0 (1.4)	−15.4 (4.3)	−8.7 (16.3)	−0.8 (30.6)	2.7 (36.9)	7.6 (45.7)	9.1 (48.4)	2.9 (37.2)	−1.1 (30.0)	−7.7 (18.1)	−16.4 (2.5)	−17.8 (0.0)
Average precipitation mm (inches)	56.3 (2.22)	40.7 (1.60)	40.6 (1.60)	47.6 (1.87)	61.1 (2.41)	52.4 (2.06)	96.4 (3.80)	124.3 (4.89)	118.7 (4.67)	113.4 (4.46)	110.4 (4.35)	83.7 (3.30)	948.7 (37.35)
Average snowfall cm (inches)	200 (79)	148 (58)	81 (32)	8 (3.1)	0 (0)	0 (0)	0 (0)	0 (0)	0 (0)	1 (0.4)	32 (13)	171 (67)	643 (253)
Average precipitation days (≥ 1.0 mm)	15.1	12.5	11.2	9.2	9.7	7.9	8.9	9.4	11.8	14.0	16.2	17.6	143.5
Average snowy days (≥ 3 cm)	19.8	16.1	10.7	1.1	0	0	0	0	0	0.1	3.5	15.7	67
Mean monthly sunshine hours	25.7	43.6	111.5	171.8	195.1	165.1	161.4	169.2	161.7	126.1	55.4	19.8	1,406.3
Source: Japan Meteorological Agency

== History ==
- 1880: The village of Hattari was founded.
- 1897: The village of Maeda was founded.
- 1901: The village of Kozawa was founded.
- 1906: Hattari Village and Maeda Village became Second Class Villages.
- 1909: Kozawa Village became a Second Class Village.
- 1923: Hattari Village and Maeda Village became First Class Villages.
- 1955: Hattari Village, Maeda Village, and Kozawa Village were merged to form the new village of Kyōwa.
- 1971: Kyōwa Village became Kyōwa Town.

== Economics ==
Kyōwa's main economic activity is farming, with watermelon, Japanese melon, and sweet corn as major crops. In line with the agricultural theme, the town's mascot is the kakashi, or scarecrow, images of which adorn features of the town including brickwork and light posts.

== Education ==
- High school
  - Hokkaido Kyōwa High School
- Junior high school
  - Kyōwa Junior High School
- Elementary school
  - Hokushin Elementary School
  - Seiryo Elementary School
  - Toyo Elementary School

== Transportation ==
Iwanai Line (Japanese National Railways) used to run through the town from Kozawa Station to Iwanai Station (Iwanai).

- Hakodate Main Line: Kozawa Station
- Route 5
