= Shakotan District, Hokkaido =

District in Hokkaido, Japan

Coordinates: 43.297°N 140.466°E

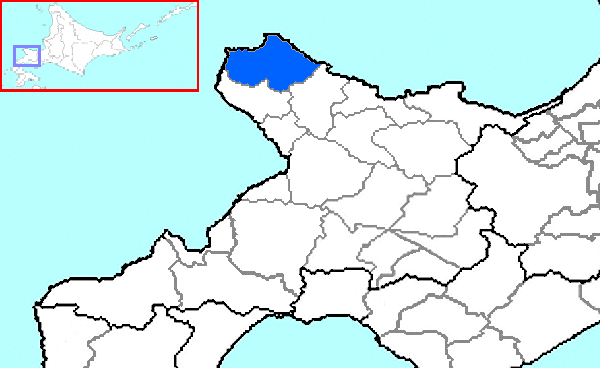
Shakotan District in Shiribeshi Subprefectures

Shakotan (積丹郡, Shakotan-gun) is a district located in Shiribeshi Subprefecture, Hokkaido, Japan.

== Population ==
As of 2004, the district has an estimated population of 2,947 and a density of 12.37 persons per km^{2}. The total area is 238.20 km^{2}.

== Etymology ==
The name of the town originates from the word "ShakKotan" in the Ainu language. It is formed from two words, the first, "shak", meaning "summer", and the second, "kotan", meaning "village".

In the Japanese language the name of the district is written with ateji, or kanji characters used to phonetically represent native or borrowed words. The first, 積, means to "store" or "accumulate", and the second, 丹, means "red" or "red earth". The meaning of the written form of Shakotan has no relationship to the meaning of "Shakotan" in the Ainu language.

== Geography and climate ==
Shakotan District is a peninsula located on the southwestern coast of Hokkaido. The district borders the city of Otaru in the Shiribeshi District to the east and is approximately forty miles from the prefectural capital Sapporo. Shakotan District is characterized by steep mountains as high as 1,300m interspersed with flatlands suitable to farming. Small streams flow down from the mountains feeding small wetlands and ponds.

Shakotan District has a humid continental climate. As with much of Hokkaido, the temperature of the district varies widely, from mild, humid summers to snowy winters.

== History ==
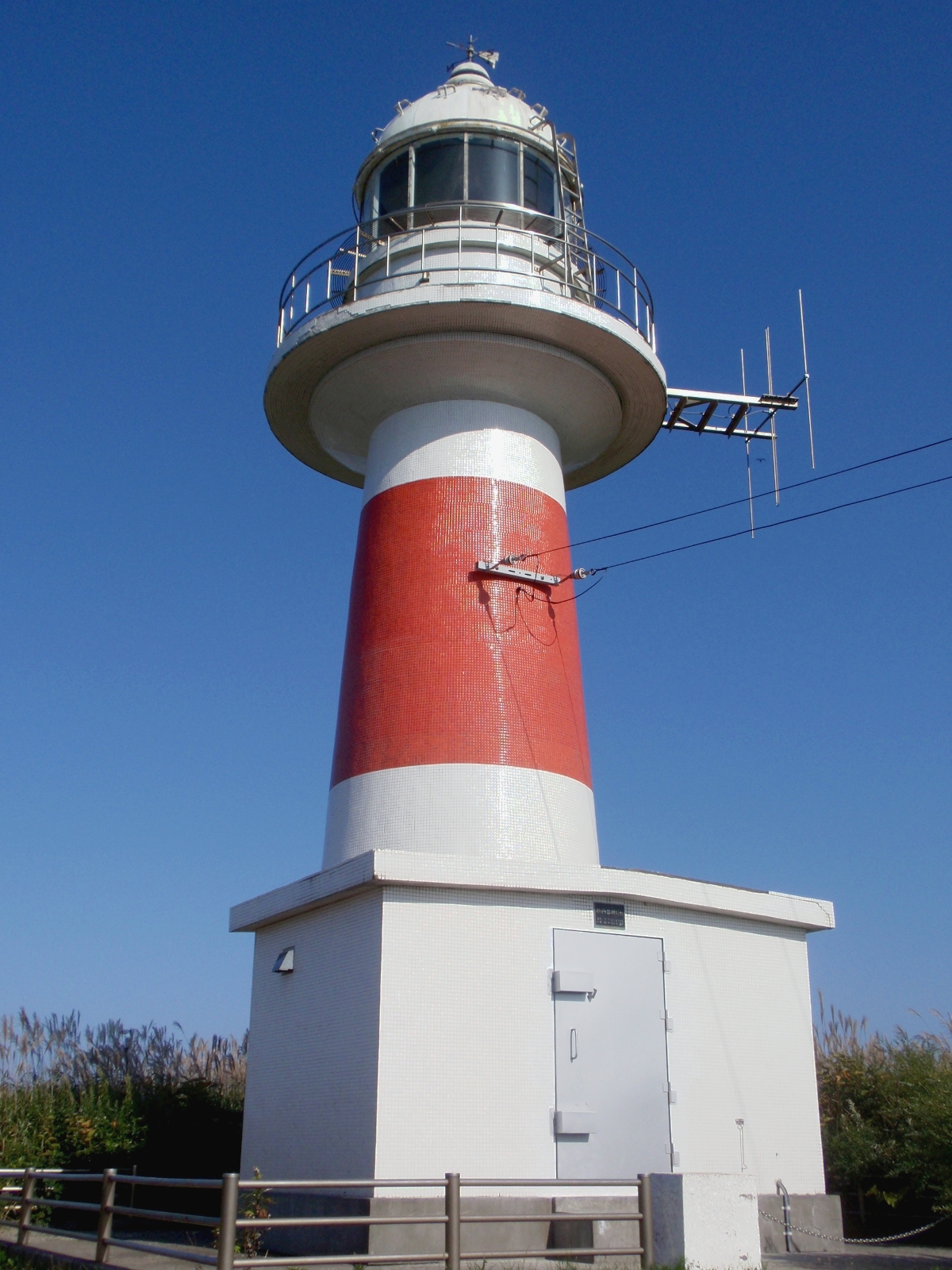
Cape Shakotan Lighthouse

Shakotan was first settled by the Japanese immigrants in the Edo period (1603 – 1868). The Tokugawa shogunate, the feudal rulers of Japan of the period, granted the Matsumae Clan rights to trade with the Ainu people in the southern Hokkaido region.

Some samurai families during the Edo period chose to give up life as a warrior class, migrating to Shakotan to farm and develop the rich herring industry.

In 1940, an earthquake occurred that was centered offshore of the Shakotan peninsula, causing a tsunami.

== Towns ==
Towns and villages in the area include Shakotan.

== Economy ==
The district's economy is dominated by rural farming, commercial fishing, and to a lesser extent, local tourism.

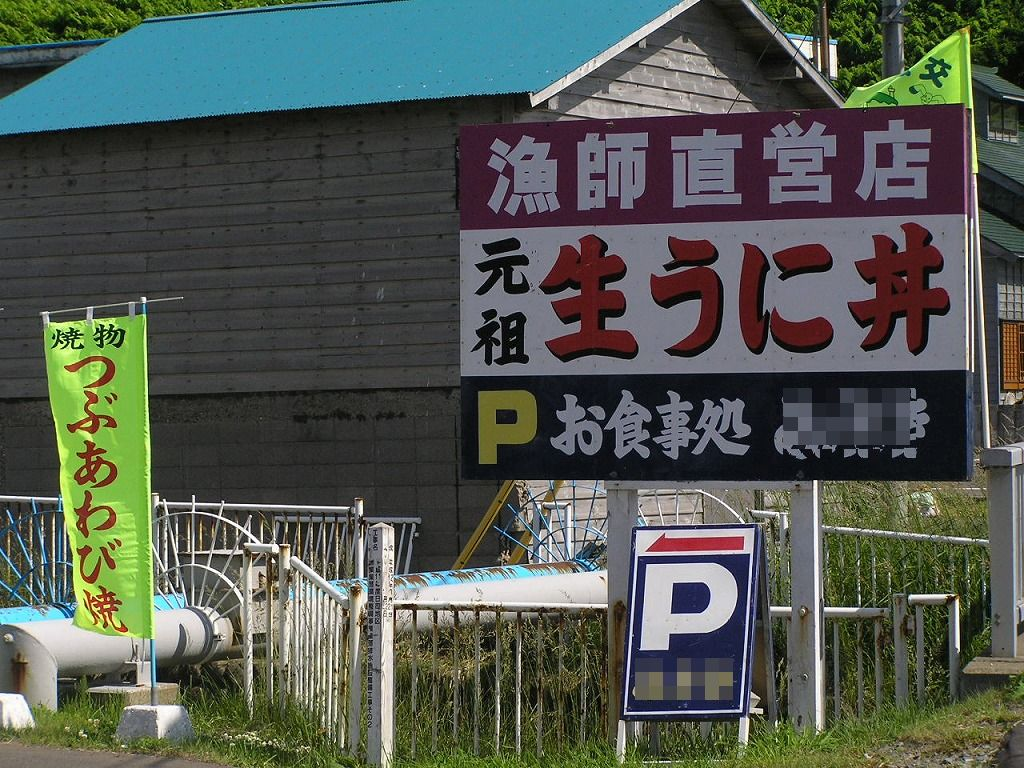
Unidon restaurant, Shakotan

The fishing industry remains an important part of the economy of Shakotan. Shakotan is noted for its catch of sea urchin (uni), squid, Olive flounder, cod, and Alaska pollock.

Tourists mainly from Sapporo come to the district for hiking, fishing, sea kayaking, the local temple's annual Fire Festival, and the peninsula's scenery, called "Hokkaido’s wild western tip". In the 2010s, about 50,000 visitors traveled annually to the District, according to a tourism management study.
