= Tomari, Hokkaido =

Tomari 泊村
- Village
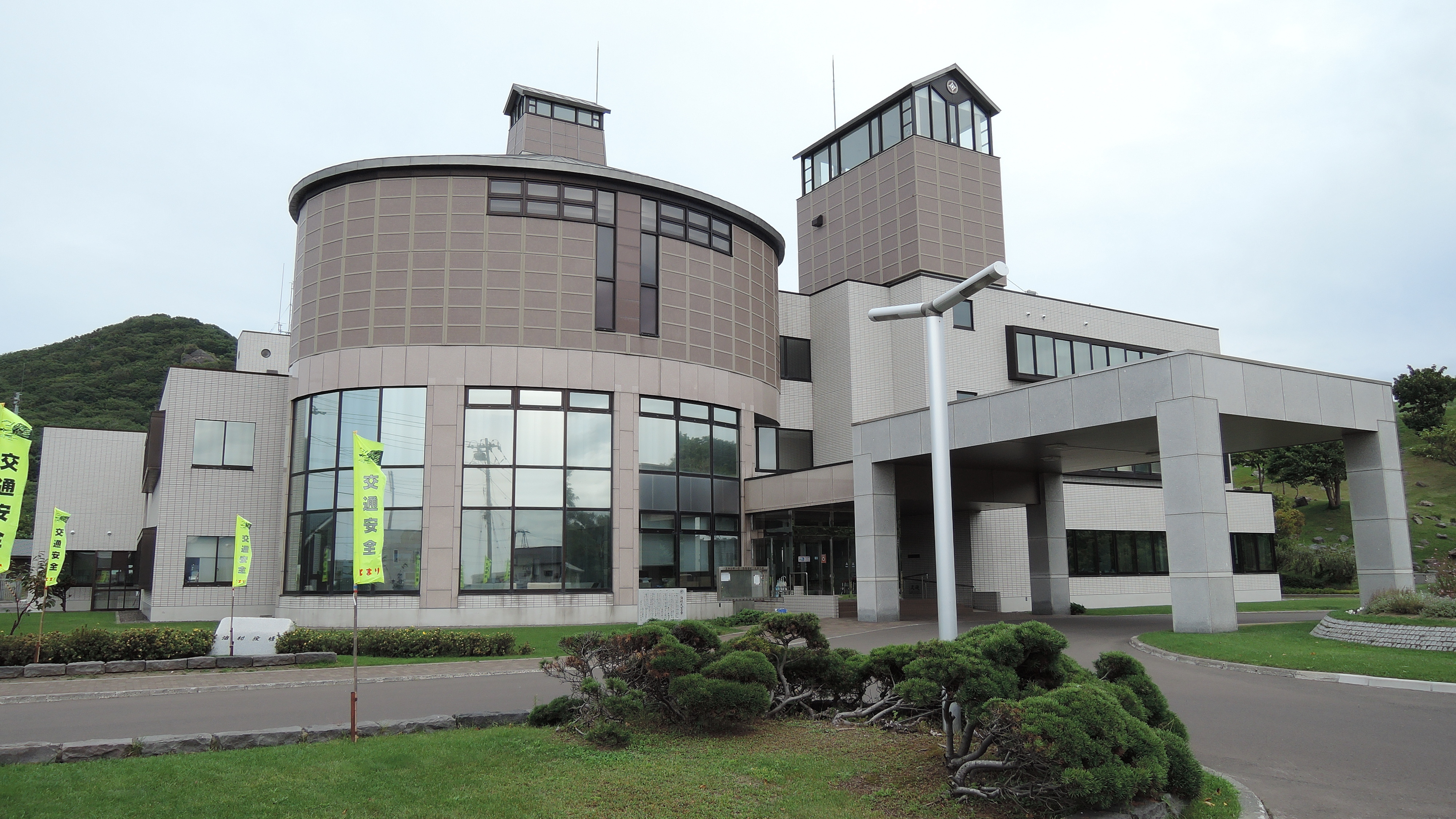
- Tomari Village hall

- Flag Seal

- Location of Tomari in Hokkaido (Shiribeshi Subprefecture)

- Location in Japan
- Coordinates: 43°4′N 140°30′E
- Country: Japan
- Region: Hokkaido
- Prefecture: Hokkaido (Shiribeshi Subprefecture)
- District: Furuu

Government
  - Mayor: Hiroomi Makino

Area
  - Total: 82.35 km^{2} (31.80 sq mi)

Population (September 30, 2016)
  - Total: 1,750
  - Density: 21.3/km^{2} (55.0/sq mi)
- Time zone: UTC+09:00 (JST)
- City hall address: 191-7 Usubetsu, Kayanumamura, Tomari, Fufuu-gun, Hokkaido; 045-0202
- Website: www.vill.tomari.hokkaido.jp
- Symbols
- Flower: Lilium pensylvanicum
- Tree: Cherry blossom

Tomari (泊村, Tomari-mura) is a village located in Shiribeshi Subprefecture, Hokkaido, Japan. As of September 2016, the village had a population of 1,750, and a density of 21 persons per km^{2}. The total area is 82.35 square kilometres (31.80 mi^{2}).

== Etymology ==
The name of the town originates from the word "Hemoi-tomari" in the Ainu language. "Hemoi-tomari" is formed from two Ainu-language words, the first, "hemoi", meaning "trout", and the second, "tomari", meaning "harbor". In the Japanese language the name of the town is written with a single kanji character, 泊, meaning "anchored" or "at anchor". The written form of the name in Japanese is an ateji, or a kanji character used to phonetically represent native or borrowed words.

== Geography ==
Tomari is situated on the western coast of the Shakotan Peninsula along the Sea of Japan. Tomari runs 11.8 kilometres (7.3 mi) from east to west and 14.6 kilometres (9.1 mi) from north to south. 70.57% of the village is forested, and has little arable land. Tomari is known for its view of the sunset on the Sea of Japan. The coast of the village is protected as part of Niseko-Shakotan-Otaru Kaigan Quasi-National Park.

=== Neighboring towns and village ===
- Furubira
- Kamoenai
- Kyōwa

== Economy ==
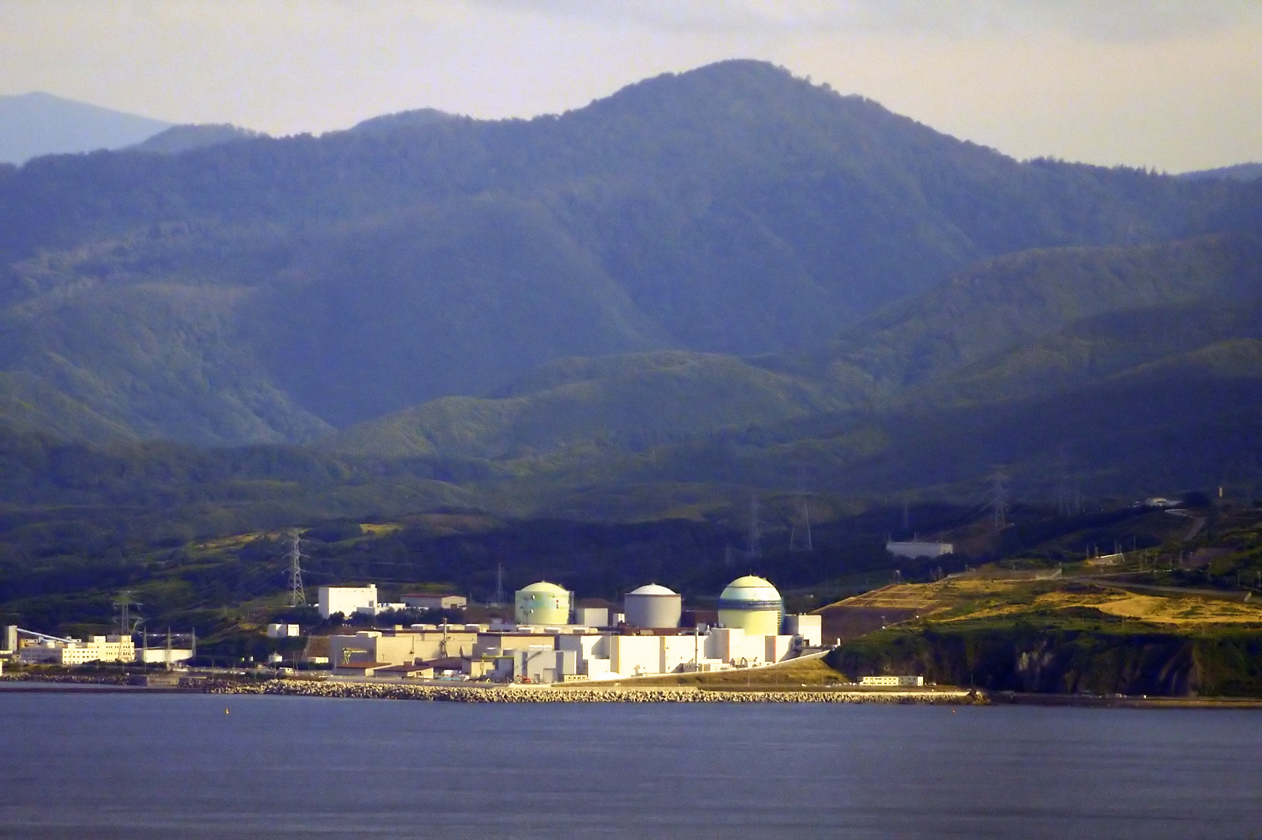
Tomari Nuclear Power Plant

The village is known for fishing and seafood, including sea urchin (uni), sea cucumber (namako) and squid (ika).

Tomari has been linked with energy and power generation since the beginning of the 20th century, giving it its current nickname of "Hometown of Energy". The village is famous for being the site of Hokkaido's only nuclear power plant, the Tomari Nuclear Power Plant. Its first reactor became operational in 1989, and its second in 1991. Tax revenue from the nuclear power plant has ensured that Tomari's local government, unlike most rural villages, operates at a consistent surplus.

== History ==
Historically, the Kayanuma area of the village was a coal mining town. The town was first settled by the Japanese in 1601, and was incorporated as a village in 1880. The villages of Sakazaki, Okishinai, Horikatsubu, and Kayanuma were merged into Tomari in 1909.

== Sister city ==
Ikata, Ehime, Japan

== Education ==
- Junior high school
  - Tomari Junior High School
- Elementary school
  - Tomari Elementary School
