= Iwanai =

Iwanai 岩内町
- Town
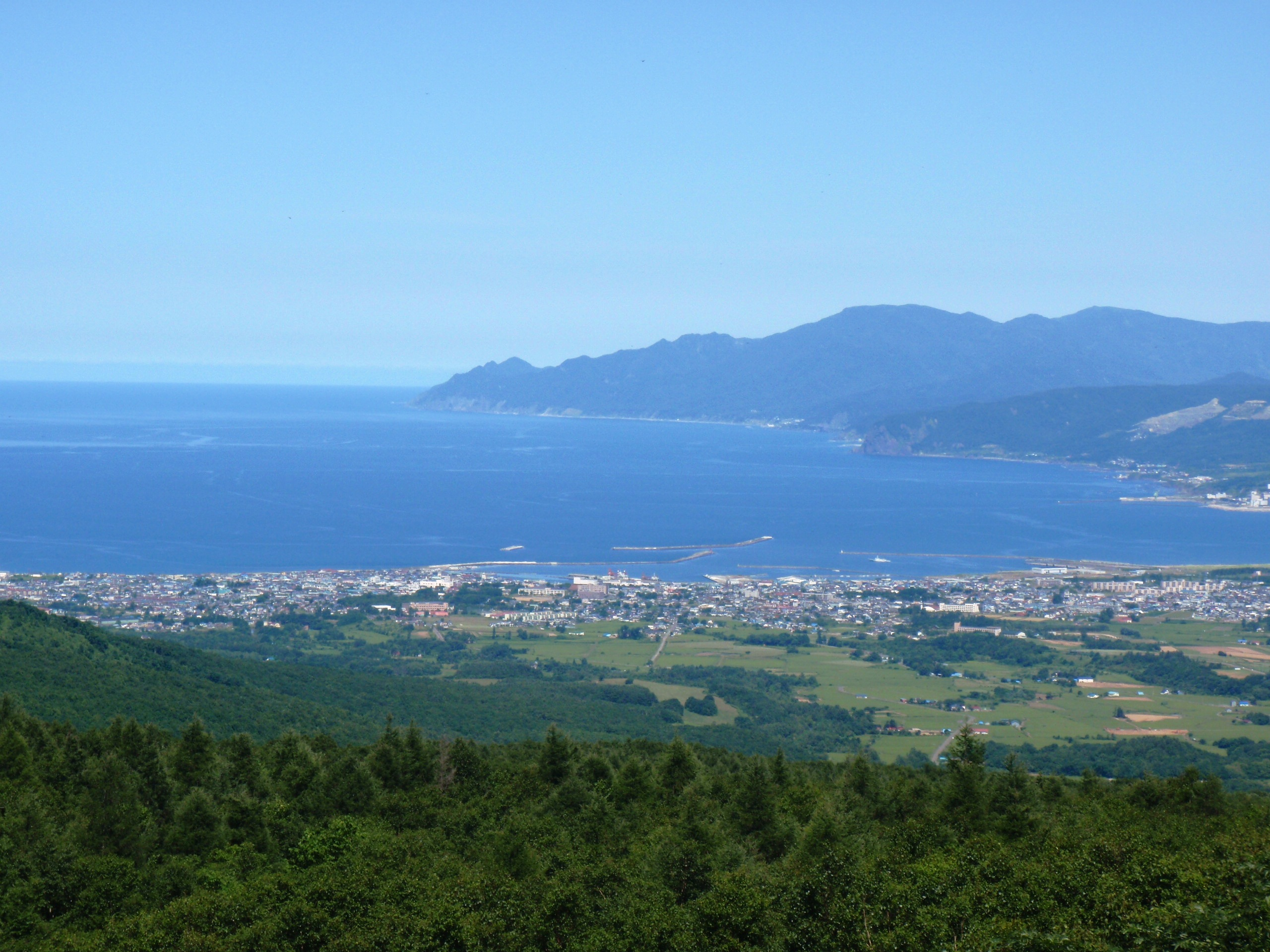

- Flag Emblem

- Location of Iwanai in Hokkaido (Shiribeshi Subprefecture)

- Location in Japan
- Coordinates: 42°58′44″N 140°30′33″E
- Country: Japan
- Region: Hokkaido
- Prefecture: Hokkaido (Shiribeshi Subprefecture)
- District: Iwanai

Government
  - Mayor: Yuji Kamioka

Area
  - Total: 70.64 km^{2} (27.27 sq mi)

Population (September 30, 2016)
  - Total: 13,210
  - Density: 187.0/km^{2} (484.3/sq mi)
- Time zone: UTC+09:00 (JST)
- City hall address: 134-1 Takadai, Iwanai, Iwanai-gun, Hokkaido; 045-8555
- Website: www.town.iwanai.hokkaido.jp
- Symbols
- Flower: Lespedeza
- Mascot: Taramaru (たら丸)
- Tree: Sorbus commixta

Iwanai (岩内町, Iwanai-chō) is a town located in Shiribeshi Subprefecture, Hokkaido, Japan.

As of September 2016, the town has an estimated population of 13,210. The total area is 70.64 km^{2}.

== History ==
Iwanai is one of the oldest towns in the region. Unlike many Hokkaido towns, it predates the Meiji Restoration, having started as a seasonal fishing location c. 1450, and developing into a year-round village in the mid-18th century. (Its official founding date is 1751). Citizens of Iwanai whose families have been native for many generations have a peculiar "fisherman" accent to their Japanese, distinct to others living in the region. (Most Hokkaido citizens speak Kantō, or Tokyo region, dialect; their ancestors emigrated from the Kantō region in the late 19th century).

A massive fire broke out in Iwanai in 1954, partly due to the effects of Typhoon Marie, and destroyed most of the traditional buildings, as they were mostly wooden structures. Modern Iwanai is much more Western in style, although there are still extensive Shinto shrines and Buddhist temples intact or rebuilt in the traditional fashion. The town also has a large shrine festival held every July.

- 1897: Iwanai Subprefecture was established.
- 1900: Iwanai Town became a First Class Town.
- 1910: Iwanai Subprefecture was abolished and Shiribeshi Subprefecture was established in Kutchan.
- 1954: A massive fire occurred.
- 1955: Iwanai Town was merged with Shimano Village to form the new town of Iwanai.
- 1985: Iwanai Line was abolished.

== Geography ==
Iwanai is located on the western of the Shakotan Peninsula. A part of the town is in Niseko-Shakotan-Otaru Kaigan Quasi-National Park.

=== Neighboring towns ===
- Kyowa
- Rankoshi

== Economics ==
Today Iwanai still has a heavy fishing industry, along with farming in the local region. It also has skiing in winter. Although the local slopes are rougher than those of nearby Kutchan, the bay is visible from the slopes. The town is also well known in the region for its sushi restaurants.

== Education ==
- Iwanai Town Board Of education
  - High school
    - Hokkaido Iwanai High School
  - Junior high school
    - Iwanai Daiichi Junior High School
    - Iwanai Daini Junior High School
  - Elementary school
    - Iwanai Higashi Elementary School
    - Iwanai Nishi Elementary School

== Culture ==
=== Mascot ===
Taramaru, the town's mascot

Iwanai's mascot is Taramaru (たら丸), who is an anthropomorphic Alaska pollack. His marks are "nejiri hachimaki" (a traditional Japanese headband), a "kuroi nagagutsu" (a black boot) and his mouth and always carries an asparagus as a weapon. His birthday is 9 August 1985. His siblings are Beniko (べに子) who is his twin sister and Pinsuke (ぴん助) who is his littler brother.

== Sister cities ==
- Slavyanka, Primorsky Krai, Russia
- Fukaura, Aomori, Japan
- Jōetsu, Niigata, Japan

== Notable people from Iwanai ==
- Tetsuo Osawa, cyclist
- Chikara Tanabe, wrestler
- Ichiyamamoto Daiki, professional sumo wrestler
