= Shakotan Peninsula =

Peninsula on the west coast of Hokkaidō, Japan

Coordinates: 43°20′01″N 140°20′46″E

Shakotan Peninsula Shakotan-hantō
- Peninsula
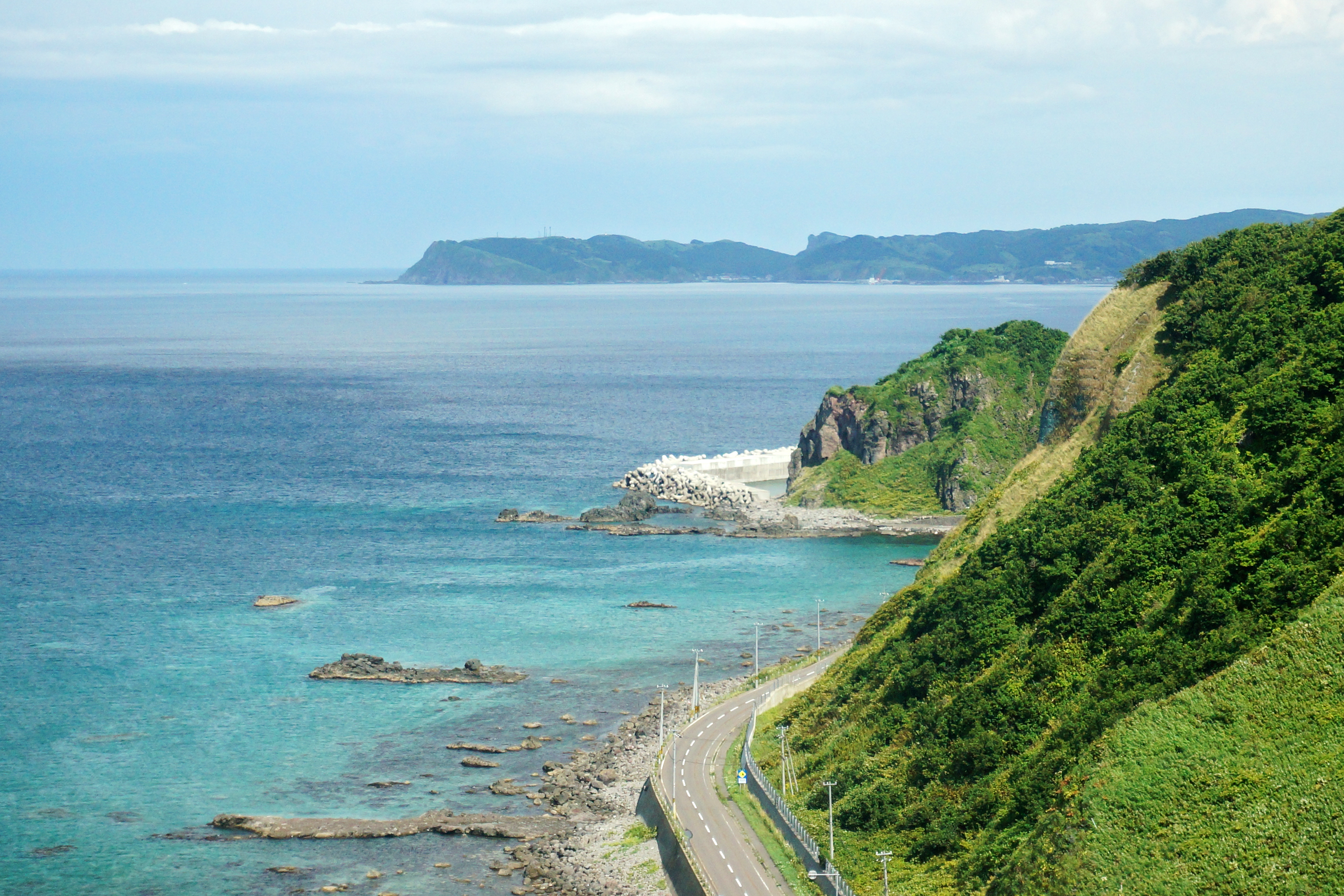
- Cape Shakotan, Shakotan Peninsula
- Interactive map of Shakotan Peninsula
- Location: Shiribeshi Subprefecture, Hokkaido, Japan

Dimensions
  - Length: 30 m (98 ft)
- Highest elevation: 1,255 m (4,117 ft) (Mount Shakotan)

Location

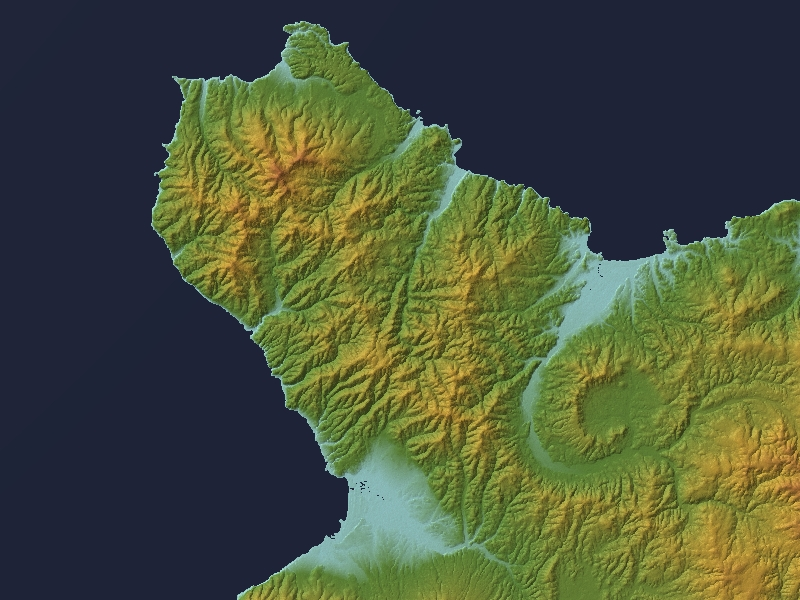
Satellite image

The Shakotan Peninsula (積丹半島, Shakotan hantō) in Shiribeshi, on the west coast of Hokkaido, Japan, is a mountainous peninsula which projects some 30 kilometres (19 mi) into the Sea of Japan. The Shakotan Peninsula forms part of the Niseko-Shakotan-Otaru Kaigan Quasi-National Park.

== Geography ==
The peninsula has a rugged terrain with few level areas. The coastline of the peninsula suffers from extensive marine erosion, which resulted in the numerous natural stone pillars which project from the sea. Mount Shakotan (1,255 metres (4,117 ft)) forms the highest peak on the peninsula. The peninsula has numerous scenic capes and inlets, notably Cape Shakotan and Cape Kamui.

=== Municipalities ===
The Shakotan Peninsula spans seven municipalities in Hokkaido, all within Shiribeshi Subprefecture.

- Iwanai (East entrance)
- Kyōwa
- Tomari
- Kamoenai
- Shakotan
- Furubira
- Yoichi (West entrance)

== Economy ==
The area was once a thriving center of Pacific herring fishing, which was conducted from the villages of Furubira, Iwanai, and Yoichi.

== See also ==
- Cape Kamui (神威岬, Kamui Misaki); the Northwest point.
