= Kamoenai, Hokkaido =

Kamoenai 神恵内村
- Village
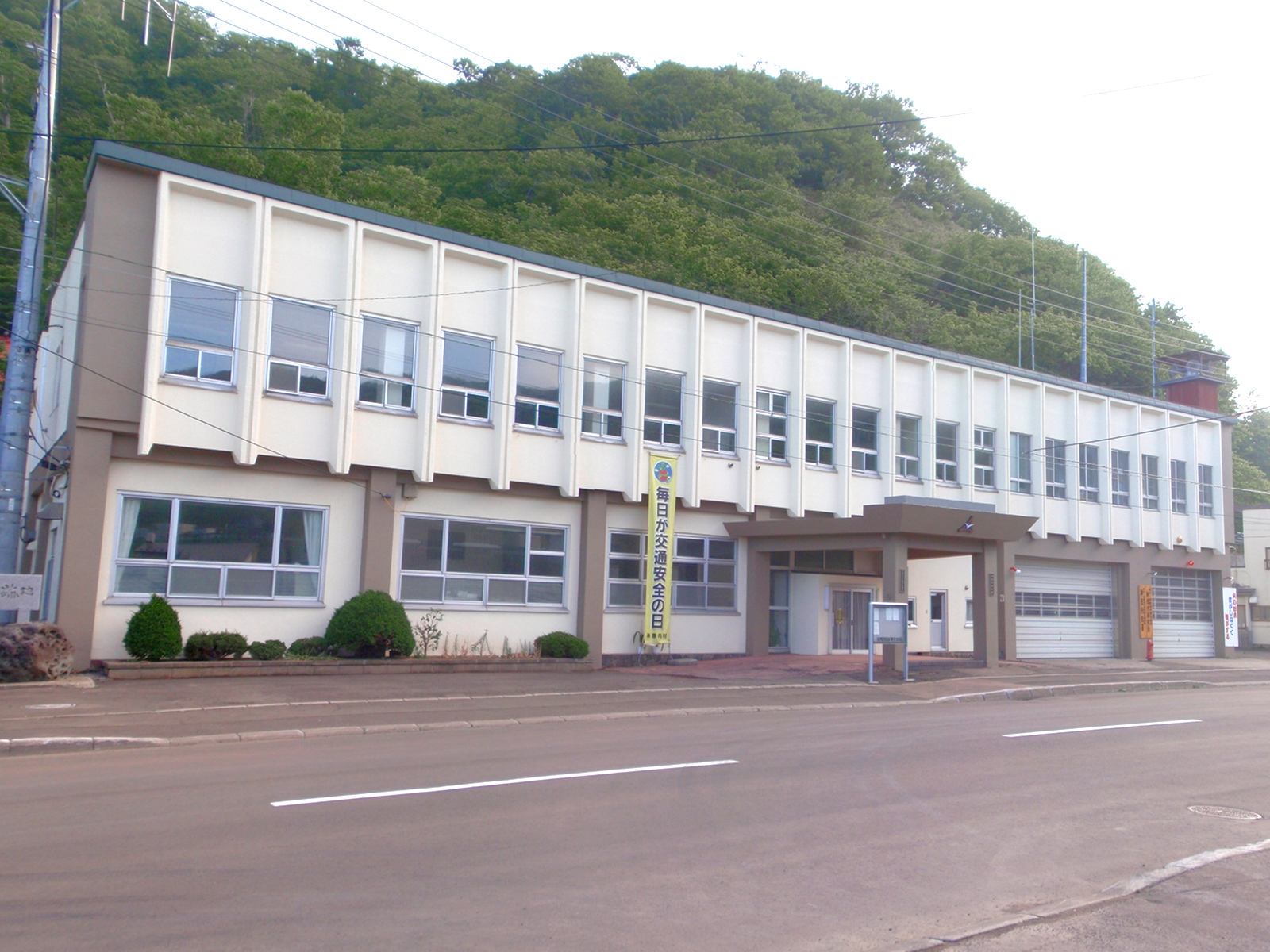
- Kamoenai village office

- Flag Emblem

- Location of Kamoenai in Hokkaido (Shiribeshi Subprefecture)

- Location in Japan
- Coordinates: 43°9′N 140°26′E
- Country: Japan
- Region: Hokkaido
- Prefecture: Hokkaido (Shiribeshi Subprefecture)
- District: Furuu

Government
  - Mayor: Masayuki Takahashi

Area
  - Total: 147.71 km^{2} (57.03 sq mi)

Population (September 30, 2016)
  - Total: 904
  - Density: 6.12/km^{2} (15.9/sq mi)
- Time zone: UTC+09:00 (JST)
- City hall address: 81-4 Kamoenaimura, Kamoenai, Furuu-gun, Hokkaido; 045-0301
- Climate: Dfb
- Website: www.vill.kamoenai.hokkaido.jp
- Symbols
- Fish: Chum salmon
- Mascot: Dragon-ta (どらごん太) and Tatsu-hime (たつ姫)
- Tree: Abies sachalinensis

Kamoenai (神恵内村, Kamoenai-mura) is a village located in Shiribeshi Subprefecture, Hokkaido, Japan. It is the second smallest municipality in Hokkaido by population, after Otoineppu.

As of September 2016, the village has an estimated population of 904. The total area is 147.71 km^{2}.

== Geography ==
Kamoenai is located on the western side of the Shakotan Peninsula.

=== Neighboring towns and village ===
- Furubira
- Shakotan
- Tomari

=== Climate ===
Climate data for Kamoenai (1991−2020 normals, extremes 1977−present)
Month	Jan	Feb	Mar	Apr	May	Jun	Jul	Aug	Sep	Oct	Nov	Dec	Year
Record high °C (°F)	8.9 (48.0)	12.2 (54.0)	15.2 (59.4)	22.7 (72.9)	30.0 (86.0)	29.1 (84.4)	33.5 (92.3)	33.1 (91.6)	32.2 (90.0)	24.8 (76.6)	19.6 (67.3)	15.0 (59.0)	33.5 (92.3)
Mean daily maximum °C (°F)	0.0 (32.0)	0.5 (32.9)	4.2 (39.6)	10.0 (50.0)	15.6 (60.1)	19.6 (67.3)	23.6 (74.5)	25.4 (77.7)	22.5 (72.5)	16.1 (61.0)	8.8 (47.8)	2.3 (36.1)	12.4 (54.3)
Daily mean °C (°F)	−2.3 (27.9)	−1.9 (28.6)	1.4 (34.5)	6.7 (44.1)	11.7 (53.1)	15.7 (60.3)	19.8 (67.6)	21.4 (70.5)	18.3 (64.9)	12.5 (54.5)	5.9 (42.6)	−0.2 (31.6)	9.1 (48.4)
Mean daily minimum °C (°F)	−4.7 (23.5)	−4.4 (24.1)	−1.3 (29.7)	3.6 (38.5)	8.3 (46.9)	12.4 (54.3)	16.9 (62.4)	18.3 (64.9)	14.7 (58.5)	9.1 (48.4)	2.9 (37.2)	−2.8 (27.0)	6.1 (42.9)
Record low °C (°F)	−13.0 (8.6)	−13.8 (7.2)	−9.6 (14.7)	−3.1 (26.4)	1.1 (34.0)	5.0 (41.0)	9.8 (49.6)	12.0 (53.6)	6.4 (43.5)	0.2 (32.4)	−8.3 (17.1)	−12.2 (10.0)	−13.8 (7.2)
Average precipitation mm (inches)	94.8 (3.73)	72.1 (2.84)	59.8 (2.35)	65.1 (2.56)	88.0 (3.46)	69.4 (2.73)	140.3 (5.52)	142.8 (5.62)	153.8 (6.06)	133.4 (5.25)	122.1 (4.81)	117.4 (4.62)	1,257.6 (49.51)
Average precipitation days (≥ 1.0 mm)	18.3	15.3	12.6	10.5	10.5	9.4	10.0	10.0	11.9	14.1	16.0	19.0	157.6
Mean monthly sunshine hours	42.4	58.8	123.5	173.7	198.1	171.5	157.6	166.5	169.6	129.0	65.8	35.5	1,487.5
Source: Japan Meteorological Agency

== History ==
Kamoenai was developed by fisheries. Kamoenai Village was merged with Akaishi Village and Sannai Village and became a Second Class Village in 1906.

== Education ==
- Kamoenai Elementary School
- Kamoenai Junior High School
