= Yoichi, Hokkaido =

Yoichi 余市町
- Town
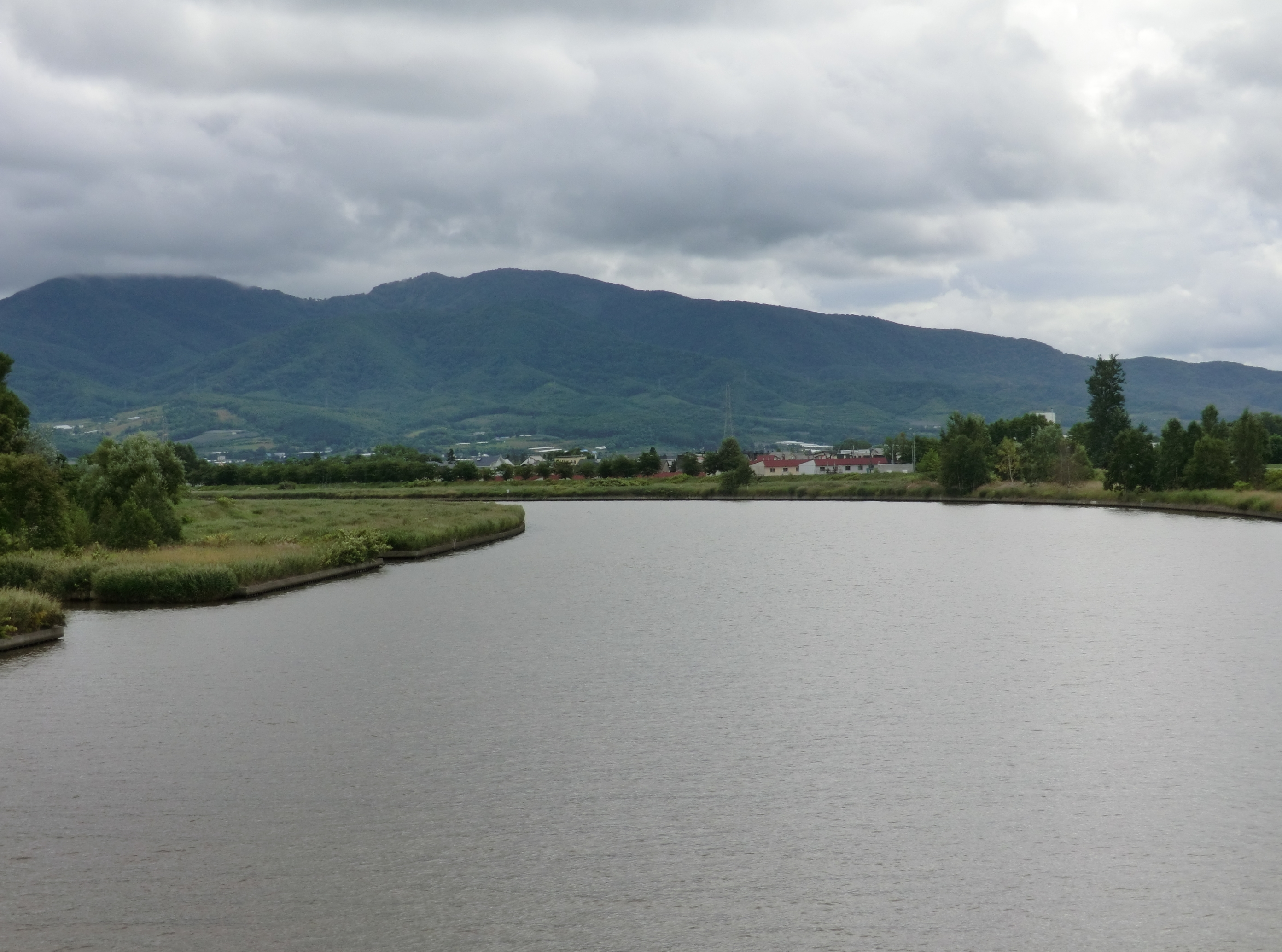
- Yoichi river

- Flag Seal

- Location of Yoichi in Hokkaido (Shiribeshi Subprefecture)

- Location in Japan
- Coordinates: 43°12′N 140°47′E
- Country: Japan
- Region: Hokkaido
- Prefecture: Hokkaido (Shiribeshi Subprefecture)
- District: Yoichi

Government
  - Mayor: Keisuke Saito

Area
  - Total: 140.60 km^{2} (54.29 sq mi)

Population (2018)
  - Total: 18,993
  - Density: 135.09/km^{2} (349.87/sq mi)
- Time zone: UTC+09:00 (JST)
- City hall address: 26 Asahi-cho, Yoichi, Yoichi-gun, Hokkaido; 046-8546
- Climate: Dfb
- Website: www.town.yoichi.hokkaido.jp
- Symbols
- Bird: Common gull
- Flower: Apple
- Tree: Apple

Yoichi (余市町, Yoichi-chō) is a town located in the Shiribeshi Subprefecture, Hokkaido, Japan.

== Demographics ==
As of September 2018, the population of Yoichi has dropped to 18,993 people, a drop of 10% over less than a decade. The density is 160 persons per km^{2}. The total area of Yoichi is 140.60 km^{2}.

== Geography ==
Yoichi is located on the southeastern edge of the Shakotan Peninsula and faces the Sea of Japan. North of the town belongs to the Niseko-Shakotan-Otaru Kaigan Quasi-National Park.

=== Neighboring municipalities ===
- Akaigawa
- Furubira
- Niki
- Otaru

=== Climate ===
The climate in Yoichi is mild (8.2 °C average), with temperatures ranging from −6 °C to 26 °C.

Climate data for Yoichi (1991−2020 normals, extremes 1977−present)
Month	Jan	Feb	Mar	Apr	May	Jun	Jul	Aug	Sep	Oct	Nov	Dec	Year
Record high °C (°F)	8.8 (47.8)	12.2 (54.0)	15.2 (59.4)	27.2 (81.0)	34.5 (94.1)	33.5 (92.3)	34.6 (94.3)	34.9 (94.8)	32.6 (90.7)	25.7 (78.3)	21.0 (69.8)	15.0 (59.0)	34.9 (94.8)
Mean daily maximum °C (°F)	−0.5 (31.1)	0.2 (32.4)	4.0 (39.2)	10.8 (51.4)	17.3 (63.1)	21.2 (70.2)	24.8 (76.6)	26.0 (78.8)	22.4 (72.3)	15.9 (60.6)	8.2 (46.8)	1.5 (34.7)	12.6 (54.8)
Daily mean °C (°F)	−3.8 (25.2)	−3.3 (26.1)	0.4 (32.7)	6.3 (43.3)	12.1 (53.8)	16.2 (61.2)	20.2 (68.4)	21.3 (70.3)	17.1 (62.8)	10.7 (51.3)	4.2 (39.6)	−1.9 (28.6)	8.3 (46.9)
Mean daily minimum °C (°F)	−7.9 (17.8)	−7.8 (18.0)	−4.1 (24.6)	1.2 (34.2)	6.7 (44.1)	11.3 (52.3)	15.9 (60.6)	17.0 (62.6)	12.2 (54.0)	5.5 (41.9)	0.0 (32.0)	−5.6 (21.9)	3.7 (38.7)
Record low °C (°F)	−20.4 (−4.7)	−21.5 (−6.7)	−16.9 (1.6)	−7.0 (19.4)	−1.7 (28.9)	1.7 (35.1)	6.5 (43.7)	8.5 (47.3)	3.0 (37.4)	−2.7 (27.1)	−12.2 (10.0)	−15.7 (3.7)	−21.5 (−6.7)
Average precipitation mm (inches)	124.5 (4.90)	100.5 (3.96)	83.9 (3.30)	65.1 (2.56)	63.6 (2.50)	51.4 (2.02)	102.5 (4.04)	129.4 (5.09)	153.5 (6.04)	138.4 (5.45)	161.8 (6.37)	150.6 (5.93)	1,325.2 (52.17)
Average snowfall cm (inches)	248 (98)	199 (78)	133 (52)	20 (7.9)	0 (0)	0 (0)	0 (0)	0 (0)	0 (0)	0 (0)	48 (19)	216 (85)	865 (341)
Average precipitation days (≥ 1.0 mm)	22.7	19.3	16.3	11.6	10.2	7.4	8.7	10.2	12.6	15.1	18.9	22.3	175.3
Average snowy days (≥ 3 cm)	24.0	19.8	16.0	3.3	0	0	0	0	0	0	4.9	20.9	88.9
Mean monthly sunshine hours	42.1	54.0	115.9	177.4	204.7	173.9	165.5	172.1	165.9	132.6	66.5	37.4	1,508.1
Source: Japan Meteorological Agency

== Industry ==
Yoichi is the home of the Yoichi distillery owned by Nikka Whisky Distilling. Yoichi is also famous for its fruit, particularly apples, and wine, and Yoichi apple juice is also famous throughout Japan. Yoichi is also becoming a well-known wine region. In Sawa-machi, near the port, there are many fish processing factories, producing goods such as migaki-nishin (dried herring).

== Culture and tourism ==
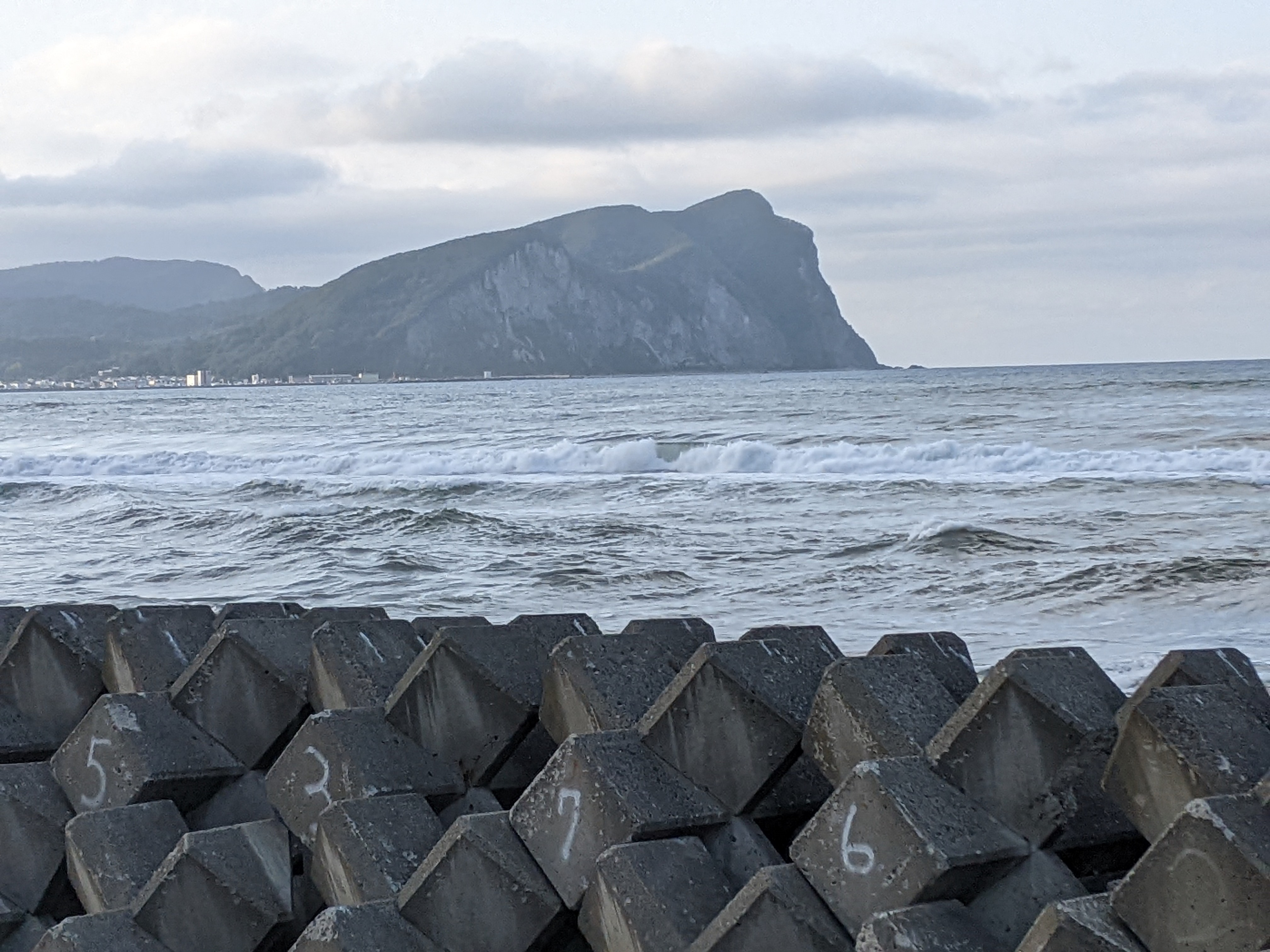
Sea of Japan, October 2022

Yoichi is a coastal town, with beaches Moire kaisuiyokujo. Yoichi is popular with surfers from autumn through to spring, but in summer there is little swell, and the coastline is better suited to kayaking and swimming. In July and August, the beaches are popular with campers and other tourists. Many people pass Yoichi on their way to explore Shakotan peninsula or Niseko. Yoichi is also close to local club ski fields such as Niki Ski Field. There are also many walks in the back country in the hills behind Yoichi.

The Yoichi Soran festival, featuring dancing, fireworks and delicious food and drink, is held every year in the first weekend of July, a few weeks after the Yoichi shrine festival.

The cave paintings at Fugoppe Cave in Yoichi are the first known signs of prehistoric life on Hokkaido. Their origin remains a mystery.

Yoichi is easily accessible by bus and train, which run approximately hourly to and from Otaru, Sapporo, and Kutchan, a town 45 minutes south of Yoichi where world class skiing and snowboarding may be enjoyed. A new motorway is being built connecting Yoichi to Sapporo, reducing the drive to 30 minutes. It is due for completion in 2018.

== Twin towns ==
Bishopbriggs, East Dunbartonshire, Scotland
Kirkintilloch, East Dunbartonshire, Scotland

== Education ==
=== High schools ===
Hokkaido Yoichi High School was merged with Hokkaido Niki High School (Niki) and Hokkaido Furubira High School (Furubira) in 2010.

- Public
  - Hokkaido Yoichi Koshi High School
- Private
  - Hokusei Gakuen Yoichi High School

=== Junior high schools ===
- Asahi Junior High School
- Higashi Junior High School
- Nishi Junior High School

=== Elementary schools ===
- Kurokawa Elementary School
- Nobori Elementary School
- Ōkawa Elementary School
- Sakae Elementary School
- Sawamachi Elementary School

== Notable people ==
Yoichi is the birthplace of Mamoru Mohri, the first Japanese astronaut; he attended elementary and junior high schools here. The Yoichi Space Museum, also called the Space Apple, was dedicated in his honor when it was opened in 1998. Other Yoichi luminaries include ski jumping Olympic gold medalists Yukio Kasaya and Kazuyoshi Funaki. They were born in Yoichi and took up ski jumping at the facility built by Masataka Taketsuru, the founder of Nikka Whisky Distilling.
