= Shiribeshi Subprefecture =

Shiribeshi Subprefecture 後志総合振興局
- Shiribeshi-sōgō-shinkō-kyoku
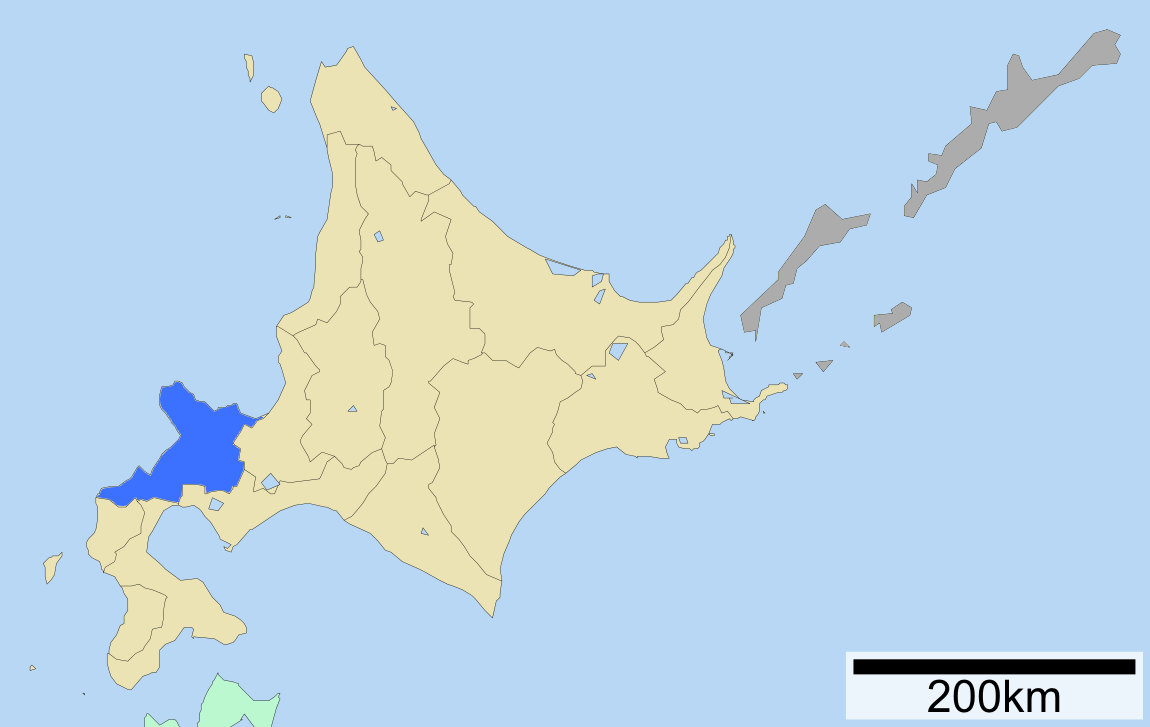
- Prefecture: Hokkaido
- Capital: Kutchan

Area
  - Total: 4,305.82 km^{2} (1,662.49 sq mi)

Population (March 2009)
  - Total: 250,065
  - Density: 58/km^{2} (150/sq mi)
- Website: shiribeshi.pref.hokkaido.lg.jp

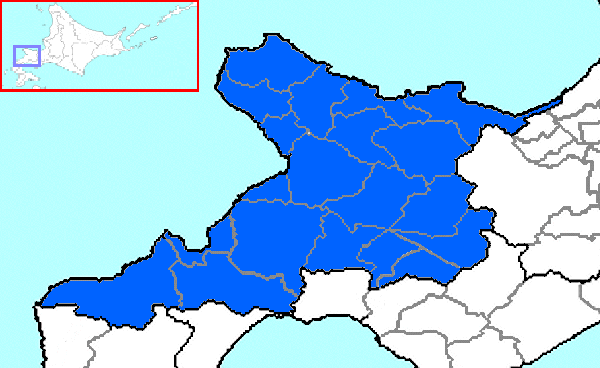
Shiribeshi Subprefecture

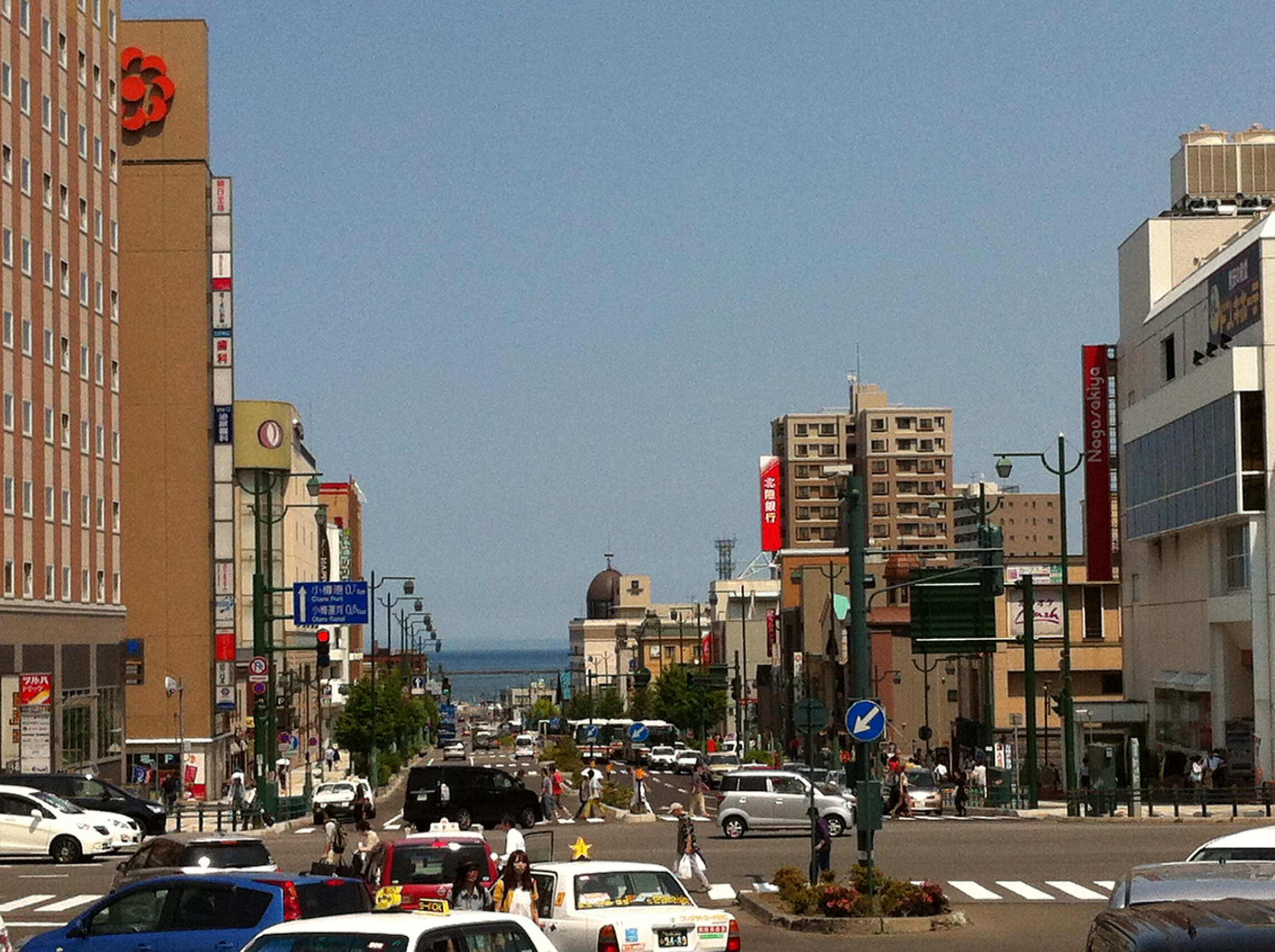
Otaru City

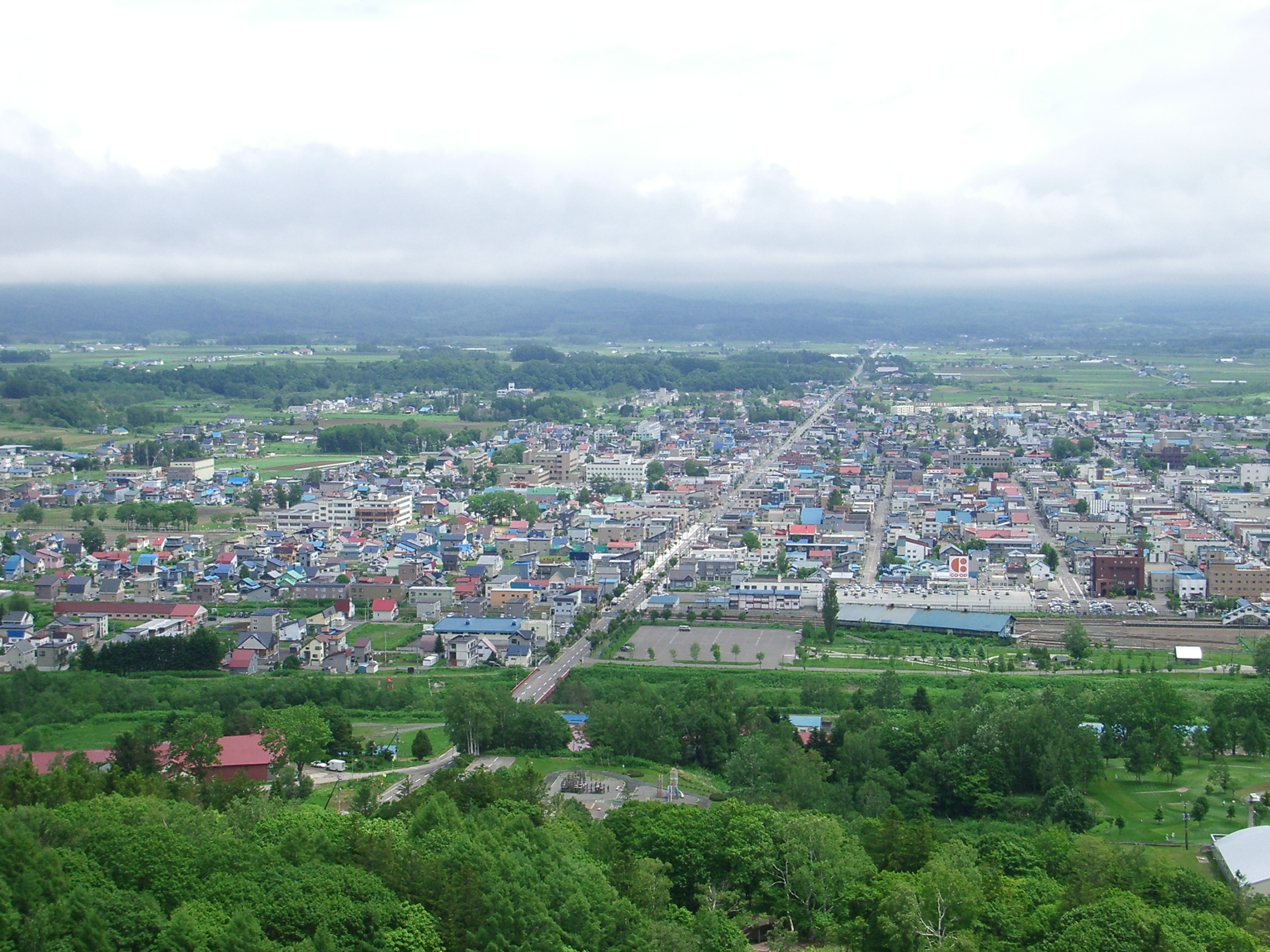
Kutchan Town (capital)

Shiribeshi Subprefecture (後志総合振興局, Shiribeshi-sōgō-shinkō-kyoku) is a subprefecture of Hokkaido Prefecture, Japan. The subprefecture's capital is Kutchan. As of July 31, 2004, the estimated population was 256,184 and the area was 4,305.65 km^{2}.

== Geography ==
=== Municipalities ===
| Name | | Area (km^{2}) | Population | District | Type | Map |
| Rōmaji | Kanji | Area (km^{2}) | Population | District | Type | Map |
|---|---|---|---|---|---|---|
| Akaigawa | 赤井川村 | 280.11 | 1,157 | Yoichi District | Village | |
| Furubira | 古平町 | 188.41 | 3,265 | Furubira District | Town | |
| Iwanai | 岩内町 | 70.64 | 13,210 | Iwanai District | Town | |
| Kamoenai | 神恵内村 | 147.71 | 904 | Furuu District | Village | |
| Kimobetsu | 喜茂別町 | 189.51 | 2,286 | Abuta District | Town | |
| Kuromatsunai | 黒松内町 | 345.65 | 2,739 | Suttsu District | Town | |
| Kutchan (capital) | 倶知安町 | 261.24 | 15,573 | Abuta District | Town | |
| Kyōgoku | 京極町 | 231.61 | 3,144 | Abuta District | Town | |
| Kyōwa | 共和町 | 304.96 | 6,136 | Iwanai District | Town | |
| Makkari | 真狩村 | 114.43 | 2,081 | Abuta District | Village | |
| Niki | 仁木町 | 167.93 | 3,874 | Yoichi District | Town | |
| Niseko | ニセコ町 | 197.13 | 4,938 | Abuta District | Town | |
| Otaru | 小樽市 | 243.13 | 115,333 | no district | City | |
| Rankoshi | 蘭越町 | 449.68 | 4,893 | Isoya District | Town | |
| Rusutsu | 留寿都村 | 119.92 | 1,940 | Abuta District | Village | |
| Shakotan | 積丹町 | 238.2 | 2,215 | Shakotan District | Town | |
| Shimamaki | 島牧村 | 437.26 | 1,560 | Shimamaki District | Village | |
| Suttsu | 寿都町 | 95.36 | 3,113 | Suttsu District | Town | |
| Tomari | 泊村 | 82.35 | 1,750 | Furuu District | Village | |
| Yoichi | 余市町 | 140.6 | 19,698 | Yoichi District | Town | |

== History ==
- 1897: Otaru Subprefecture, Iwanai Subprefecture, and Suttsu Subprefecture were established.
- 1899: Kutchan Village (now Kutchan Town and Kyōgoku Town), Abuta District were transferred from Muroran Subprefecture (now Iburi Subprefecture) to Iwanai Subprefecture.
- 1899: Otaru Subprefecture, Iwanai Subprefecture, and Suttsu Subprefecture were merged to form Shiribeshi Subprefecture. Makkari Village (now Makkari Village, Kimobetsu Town, and Rusutsu Village) and Kaributo Village (now Niseko Town), Abuta District were transferred from Muroran Subprefecture.
