= Furubira =

Furubira 古平町
- Town
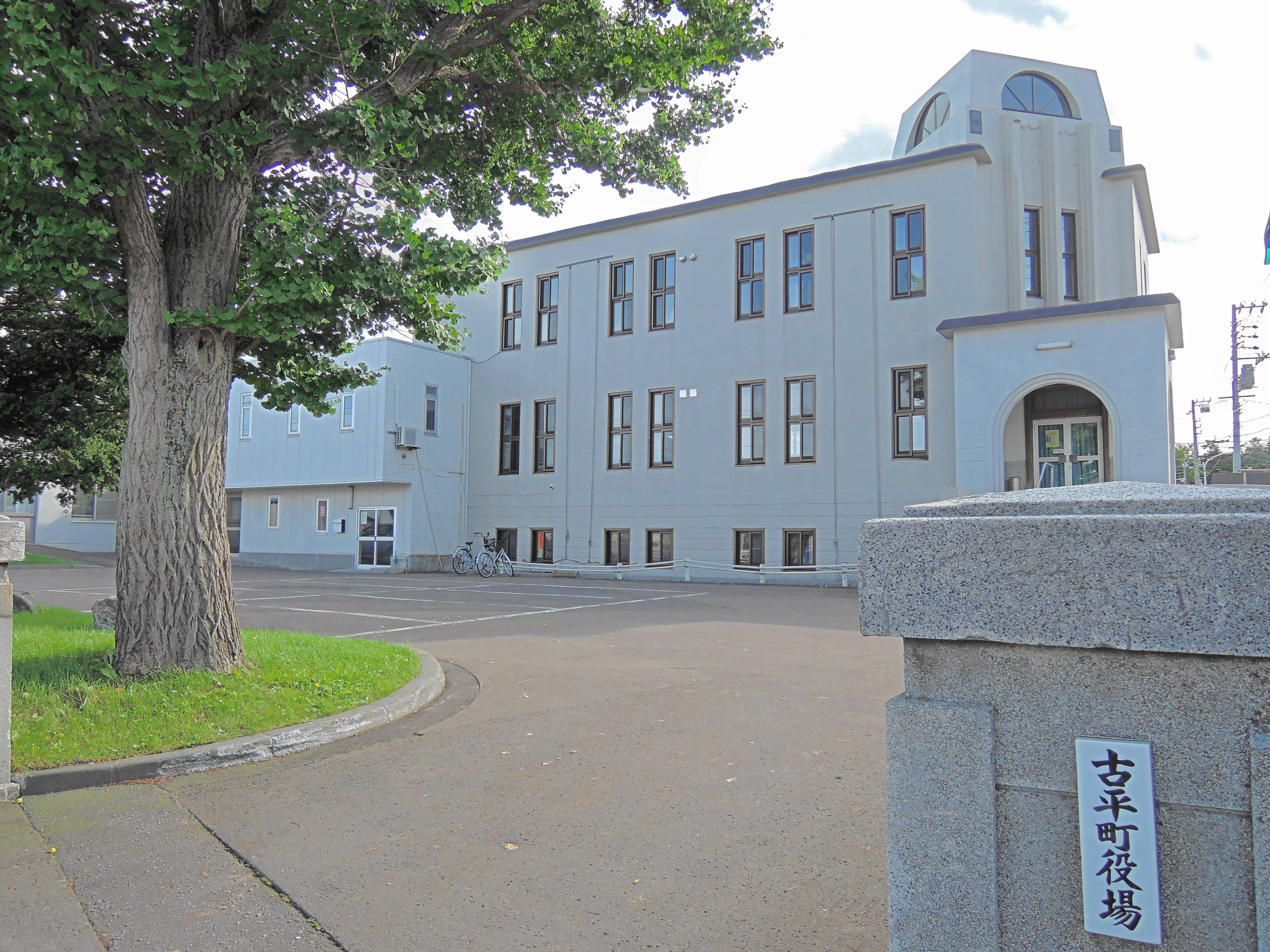
- Furubira Town hall

- Flag Emblem

- Location of Furubira in Hokkaido (Shiribeshi Subprefecture)

- Location in Japan
- Coordinates: 43°16′N 140°38′E
- Country: Japan
- Region: Hokkaido
- Prefecture: Hokkaido (Shiribeshi Subprefecture)
- District: Furubira

Government
  - Mayor: Junji Homma

Area
  - Total: 188.41 km^{2} (72.75 sq mi)

Population (30 September 2016)
  - Total: 3,265
  - Density: 17.33/km^{2} (44.88/sq mi)
- Time zone: UTC+09:00 (JST)
- City hall address: 40-4 Hama-machi, Furubira, Furubira-gun, Hokkaido; 046-0192
- Website: www.town.furubira.lg.jp

Furubira (古平町, Furubira-chō) is a town located in Shiribeshi Subprefecture, Hokkaido, Japan. As of September 2016, the town had an estimated population of 3,265, and a density of 17 persons per km^{2}. The total area is 188.41 square kilometres (72.75 mi^{2}).

== Geography ==
Furubira occupies the eastern end of the north coast of the Shakotan Peninsula facing the Sea of Japan. The town is largely built around the Furubira River, which runs from the highlands of the Shakotan Peninsula into the sea.

== Neighboring municipalities ==
- Kamoenai
- Niki
- Shakotan
- Tomari
- Yoichi

== History ==
Furubira was established as one of many Pacific herring fishing settlements in the region at the beginning of the Edo period (1603 – 1868). The town was formally incorporated in 1902.

== Economy ==
Manganese was once mined at the head of the Furubira River. The mine was located at Inakuraishi. Mining ceased in the town in 1984.

The Port of Furubira, located near Cape Maruyama, is an active fishing port. Shrimp, Alaska pollock, and saltwater clams are a mainstay of the economy. The Furubira River provides irrigation for the production of rice, potatoes, and soybeans. Beef, pork, and poultry are also raised in the town.

== Education ==
Hokkaido Furubira High School closed in 2012.

- Furubira Elementary School
- Furubira Junior High School
