= Shakotan, Hokkaido =

Shakotan 積丹町
- Town
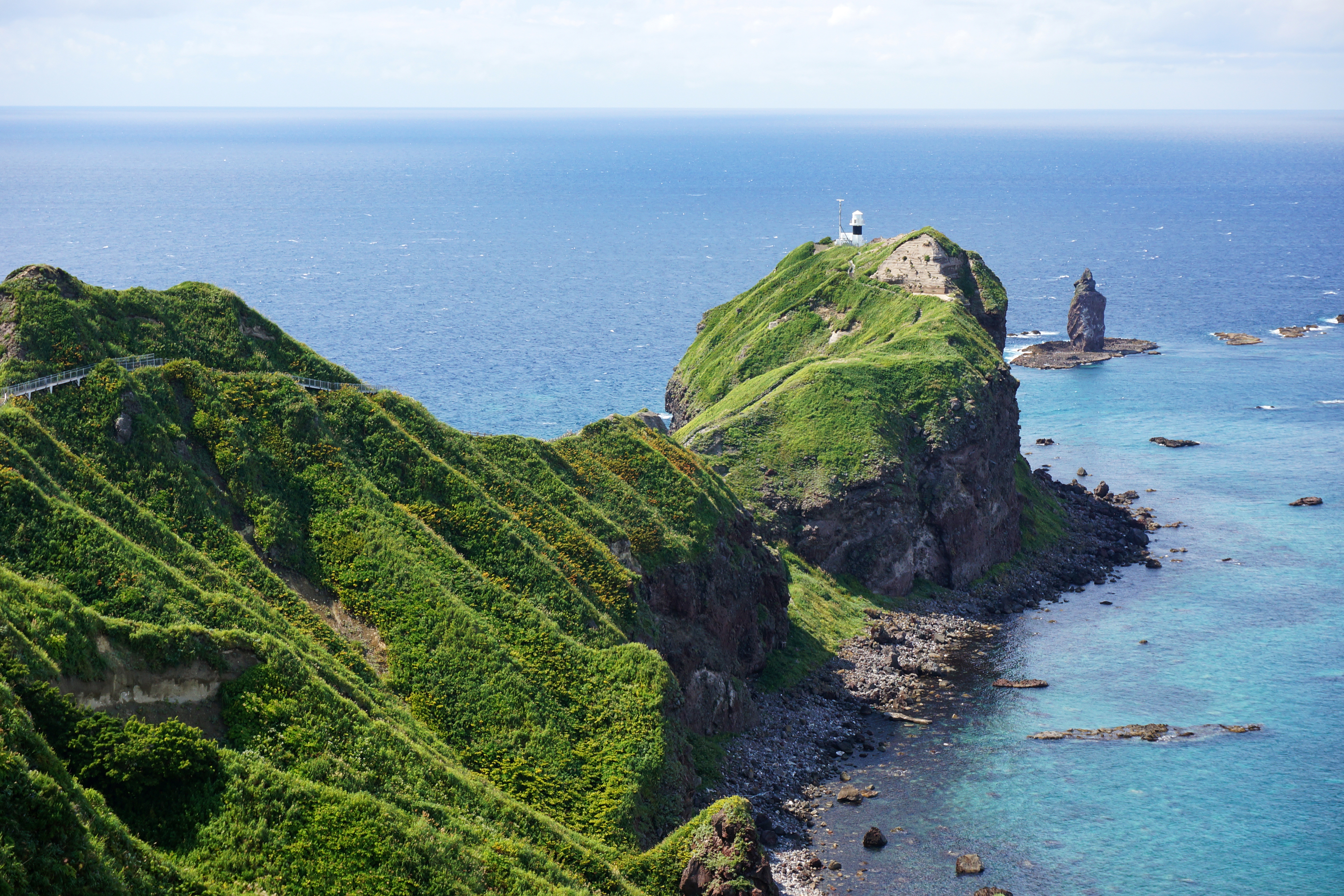
- Cape Kamui, Shakotan, Hokkaidō

- Flag Seal

- Shakotan in Shiribeshi Subprefecture

- Coordinates: 43°18′N 140°36′E
- Country: Japan
- Prefecture: Hokkaido

Area
  - Total: 238.20 km^{2} (91.97 sq mi)

Dimensions
  - Length: 24.1 km (15.0 mi)
  - Width: 18.2 km (11.3 mi)

Population (September 30, 2016)
  - Total: 2,215
  - Density: 9.299/km^{2} (24.08/sq mi)
- Time zone: UTC+9 (Japan Standard Time)
- Phone number: 0135-44-2111
- Address: 48 Funama, Bikuni-chō, Shakotan-chō, Shakotan-gun, Hokkaido; 046-0292
- Climate: Dfb
- Website: www.town.shakotan.hokkaido.jp

Shakotan (積丹町, Shakotan-chō) is a town located in Shiribeshi Subprefecture, Hokkaido, Japan. As of September 2016, the town had a population of 2,215, and a density of 9.3 persons per km^{2}. The total area of the town is 238.20 square kilometres (91.97 mi^{2}), and located 90 kilometres (56 mi) west of Sapporo, the capital and economic hub of Hokkaido. Shakotan occupies the north of the Shakotan Peninsula. It was founded in 1869 as part of the short-lived Shiribeshi Province, which was dissolved in 1882 to become Hokkaido. Shakotan, along with neighboring Otaru, is home to Japan's only national-level marine sanctuary. Shakotan is home to the three great capes of the Shakotan Peninsula: Kamui, Shakotan, and Ōgon.

== Etymology ==
The name of the town originates from the word "ShakKotan" in the Ainu language. It is formed from two words, the first, "shak", meaning "summer", and the second, "kotan", meaning "village".

In the Japanese language the name of the town is written with ateji, or kanji characters used to phonetically represent native or borrowed words. The first, 積, means to "store" or "accumulate", and the second, 丹, means "red" or "red earth". The meaning of the written form of Shakotan has no relationship to the meaning of "Shakotan" in the Ainu language.

== History ==
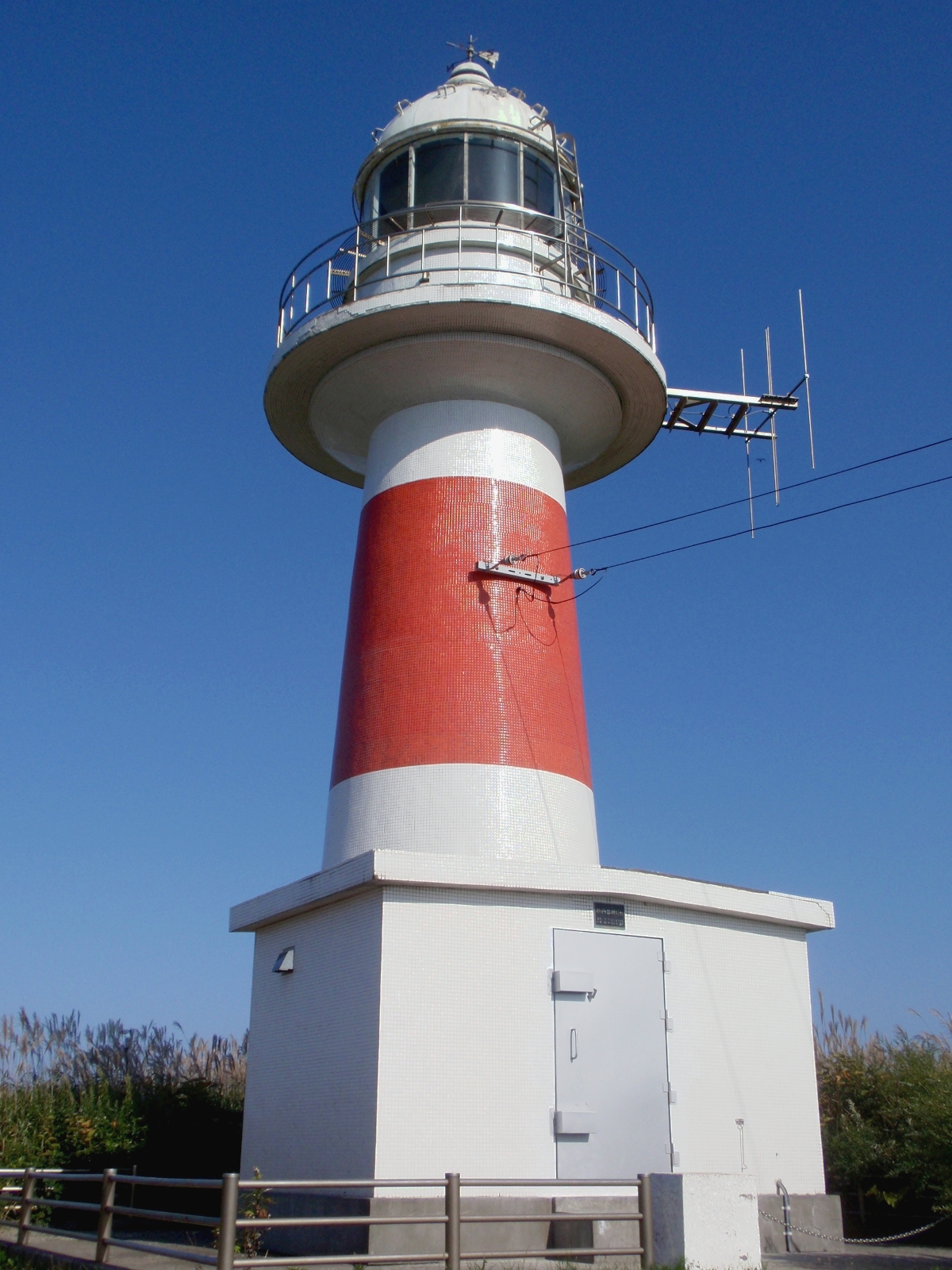
Cape Shakotan Lighthouse

Shakotan was first settled by the Japanese immigrants in the Edo period (1603 – 1868). The Tokugawa shogunate, the feudal rulers of Japan of the period, granted the Matsumae Clan rights to trade with the Ainu people in the southern Hokkaido region. With the decline of the fortune of samurai families during the Edo period, many chose to give up life as a warrior and migrate to Shakotan and other coastal areas of southern Hokkaido to farm and develop the rich herring industry. The settlements on Shakotan were connected to the rest of Japan only by sea; the construction of roads across Hokkaido did not occur until the early 20th century. During the Bakumatsu (1853 – 1867), the final years of the Edo period, fishermen began using large nets to harvest herring. Shakotan developed a large population, rivaling that of nearby Otaru. A census taken in 1879 revealed that the Funama area of Shakotan consisted of 75 households, had a population of 350, 10 horses, a school, a temple, and three Shinto shrines. The census noted the catch of Pacific herring and salmon, as well as the gathering of abalone and konbu. Shakotan was connected to other areas of Hokkaido by steam ferry in 1892. By 1899 the town had a post and telegraph office, as well as a police station, a brothel, a shipping office, and a restaurant. The era of the herring industry ended due to overfishing by 1917, and the population on the Shakotan Peninsula decreased rapidly.

The modern town of Shakotan was formed in 1956 by a merger of the town of Bikuni and the villages of Irika and Yobetsu.

== Geography ==
The town of Shakotan is located on the north of the Shakotan Peninsula in western Hokkaido, and occupies one fourth of the area of the peninsula. The border of the town is defined by the three great capes of the Shakotan Peninsula: Kamui, Shakotan, and Ōgon. The town faces the Japan Sea and has a long, scenic 42 kilometres (26 mi) sea coast. Much of the coast of Shakotan is faced by steep sea cliffs. The population of the town is concentrated in small villages along the coast. The interior of the town is rugged with little flat land, and is made up of the mountainous areas centered on the twin peaks of Mount Shakotan (1,255 metres (4,117 ft)) and Mount Yobetsu (1,298 metres (4,259 ft)).

The entire coast of Shakotan is protected as part of Niseko-Shakotan-Otaru Kaigan Quasi-National Park. The park, established in 1962, covers 190 square kilometres (73 mi^{2}), and is managed by the prefectural government of Hokkaido. Shakotan's capes and dramatic Shimamui Coast are important parts of the park. The marine park of Niseko-Shakotan-Otaru Kaigan Quasi-National Park, located off the shore of Shakotan and Otaru, is the only designated marine sanctuary in the national parks system of Japan. Fishing is prohibited along the length of the marine sanctuary.

=== Capes ===
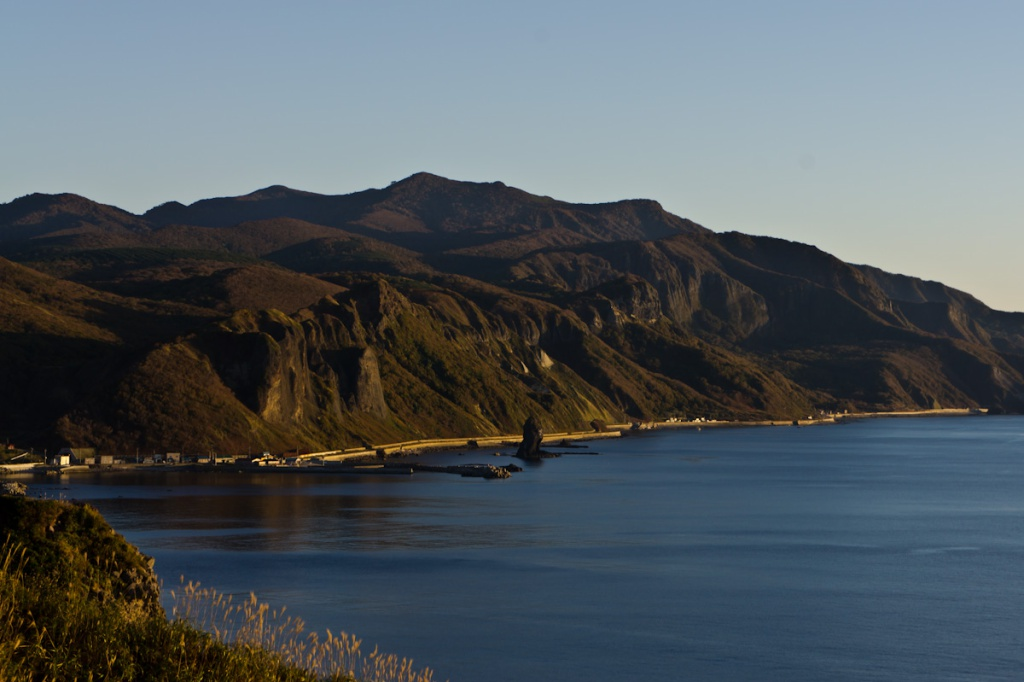
View south from Cape Kamui

The three major capes of the Shakotan Peninsula, Cape Kamui, Cape Shakotan, and Cape Ōgon, define the coast of the Shakotan Peninsula. All are located in the town of Shakotan, and numerous smaller capes dot the coastline of the town.

- Cape Ōgon is located at the east of Shakotan. Bikuni area and its fishing port sit near the cape. Cape Ōgon is topped by a popular observation post which offers a panorama of the coastal areas of the Sea of Japan and the Shakotan Peninsula. The summit of Cape Ōgon can be reached by foot in only 10 minutes, making it a popular tourist destination in the summer.^{A}
- Cape Shakotan is located at the north of Shakotan. Irika area and its fishing port sit near the cape. Cape Shakotan rises over 100 metres (330 ft) above the Sea of Japan, and offers views of the rugged coast and mountains of the Shakotan Peninsula. Cape Shakotan heads the scenic Shimamui Coast, and is home to the Cape Shakotan Lighthouse.
- Cape Kamui is located at the west of Shakotan. The Yobetsu area and its fishing port sit near the cape. Cape Kamui is designated a Prefectural Natural Landscape by Hokkaido. Its lighthouse, the Cape Kamui Lighthouse, overlooks the Sea of Japan.

=== Ports and harbors ===
Shakotan is home to four natural harbors and several small ports. Bikuni, Irika, and Yobetsu are active fishing ports. Smaller ports in the town include Kōzaki, Iwanai, and Furubira. All the fishing ports of Shakotan were once thriving centers of Pacific herring production, but now remain as general fishing ports.

=== Islands ===
The heavily forested Takara Island, with a coastline of 800 metres (2,600 ft), sits just beyond Cape Ōgon in the Bikuni area of Shakotan. Takara, meaning "treasure" in Japanese, was possibly given its name by fishermen who found rich shoals of herring around the island in the early 19th century. The smaller Gome Island sits near Takara Island, and takes its name from its similarity in shape to the Gome seagull.

=== Rivers ===
Three short rivers cut through the town. The Uendo, the Isanai, and the Ōtaki flow north from Mount Shakotan and form the Shakotan River, which flows into the Japan Sea. Smaller rivers includes the Bikuni and the Yobetsu.

=== Climate ===
The climate of Shakotan is similar to that of other Japanese coastal areas along the Sea of Japan. The town, however, receives more precipitation than other coastal areas of Hokkaido. From spring to summer Shakotan town is warm with numerous sunny days. Winters are severe, with strong winds and heavy snowfall. The coast of Shakotan is battered by strong waves throughout the winter. Level areas of the Shakotan are generally covered with snow from mid-November to mid-April.

Climate data for Estados Unidos, Shakotan, Hokkaido (1991−2020 normals, extremes 1977−present)
Month	Jan	Feb	Mar	Apr	May	Jun	Jul	Aug	Sep	Oct	Nov	Dec	Year
Record high °C (°F)	8.4 (47.1)	12.0 (53.6)	15.4 (59.7)	25.6 (78.1)	33.7 (92.7)	31.3 (88.3)	34.0 (93.2)	35.2 (95.4)	33.4 (92.1)	25.3 (77.5)	19.9 (67.8)	14.1 (57.4)	35.2 (95.4)
Mean daily maximum °C (°F)	−1.2 (29.8)	−0.5 (31.1)	3.3 (37.9)	9.7 (49.5)	16.6 (61.9)	20.3 (68.5)	23.9 (75.0)	25.3 (77.5)	21.9 (71.4)	15.4 (59.7)	7.5 (45.5)	0.8 (33.4)	11.9 (53.4)
Daily mean °C (°F)	−4.0 (24.8)	−3.5 (25.7)	−0.1 (31.8)	5.5 (41.9)	11.4 (52.5)	15.2 (59.4)	19.4 (66.9)	20.5 (68.9)	16.6 (61.9)	10.3 (50.5)	3.6 (38.5)	−2.2 (28.0)	7.7 (45.9)
Mean daily minimum °C (°F)	−7.4 (18.7)	−7.3 (18.9)	−4.1 (24.6)	0.7 (33.3)	5.9 (42.6)	10.2 (50.4)	15.0 (59.0)	16.0 (60.8)	11.5 (52.7)	5.2 (41.4)	−0.3 (31.5)	−5.4 (22.3)	3.3 (38.0)
Record low °C (°F)	−17.1 (1.2)	−17.8 (0.0)	−13.6 (7.5)	−8.0 (17.6)	−2.5 (27.5)	1.6 (34.9)	5.9 (42.6)	8.8 (47.8)	2.3 (36.1)	−2.7 (27.1)	−9.7 (14.5)	−14.7 (5.5)	−17.8 (0.0)
Average precipitation mm (inches)	203.0 (7.99)	145.2 (5.72)	119.2 (4.69)	96.2 (3.79)	82.5 (3.25)	60.3 (2.37)	123.6 (4.87)	169.7 (6.68)	208.6 (8.21)	193.8 (7.63)	246.6 (9.71)	252.1 (9.93)	1,899.4 (74.78)
Average precipitation days (≥ 1.0 mm)	25.3	21.2	17.6	12.5	11.0	8.0	9.8	10.8	13.5	16.1	20.0	24.3	190.1
Mean monthly sunshine hours	26.4	41.4	97.1	169.7	199.5	163.1	148.0	157.7	149.8	120.8	54.6	22.5	1,350.5
Source: Japan Meteorological Agency

=== Fauna and flora ===
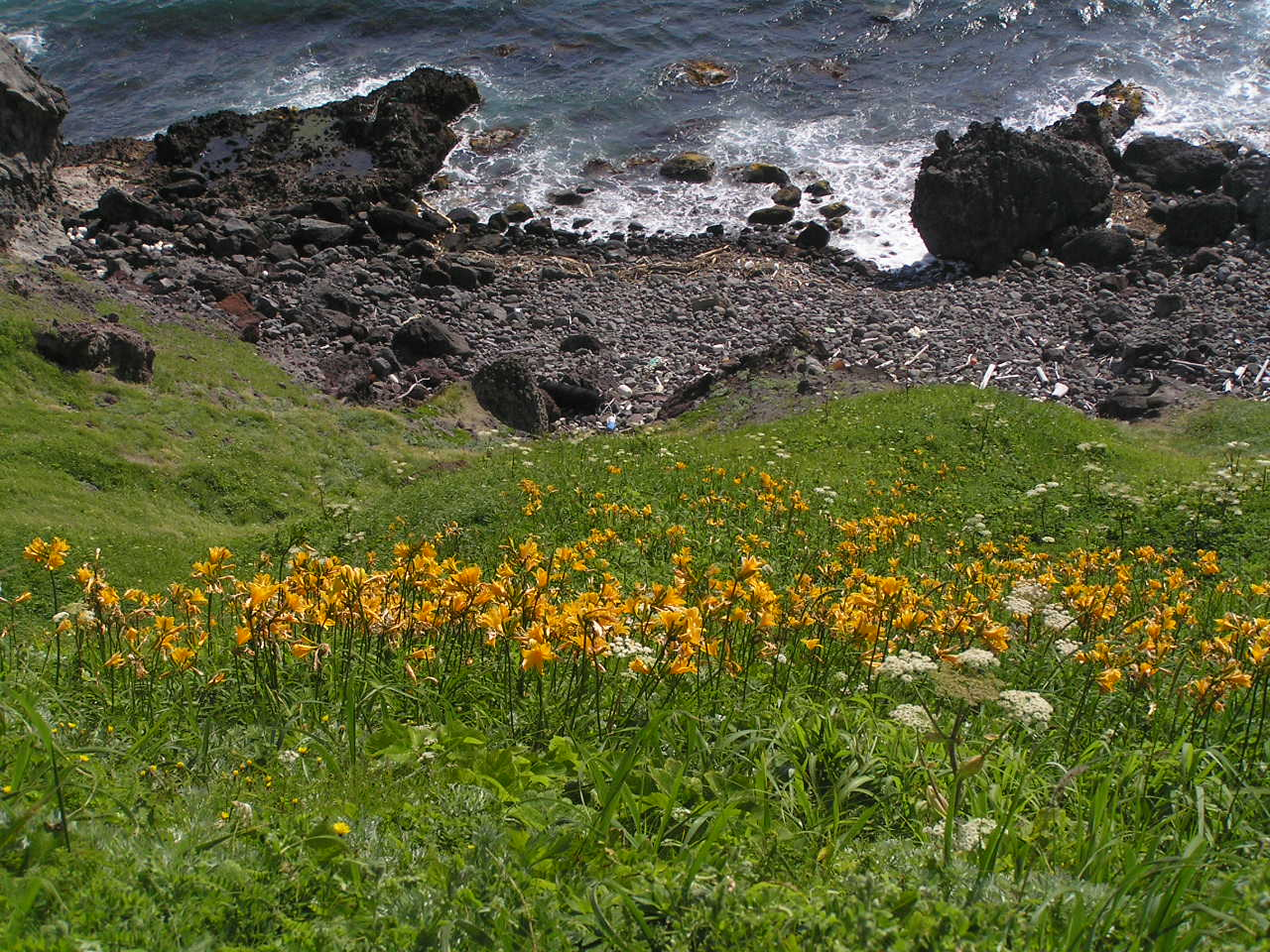
Ezokanzō, a lily species

Shakotan has large tracts of unspoiled natural areas. Gyōja garlic, taranome, and udo, all parts of traditional Japanese cuisine, are gathered in the wild during spring in Shakotan. A lily species, the ezokanzō, blooms on the Shimamui Coast in summer.

Shakotan is noted for its population of brown bears, which live in the mountainous areas of the town. The Ezo deer and Hokkaido squirrel, both native to Hokkaido, are also found in Shakotan. Populations of seals and sea lions both inhabit the coastal areas of Shakotan.

=== Neighboring municipalities ===
- Shiribeshi Subprefecture
  - Furubira, Furubira District
  - Kamoenai, Furuu District

=== Neighborhoods ===
- Irika-chō (入舸町)
- Kōzaki-chō (神岬町)
- Nishikawa-chō (西河町)
- Nojika-chō (野塚町)
- Hijika-chō (日司町)
- Bikuni-chō (美国町)
- Fumi-chō (婦美町)
- Horomui-chō (幌武意町)
- Yobetsu-chō (余別町)
- Raikishi-chō (来岸町)

== Population ==
Shakotan is in a period of significant, ongoing population decline which mirrors that of other areas of rural Japan.

Year	Population
1970	6,102
1975	5,635
1980	4,910
1985	4,271
1990	4,012
1995	3,648
2000	3,149
2005	2,860
2010	2,514
2016	2,215

== Economy ==
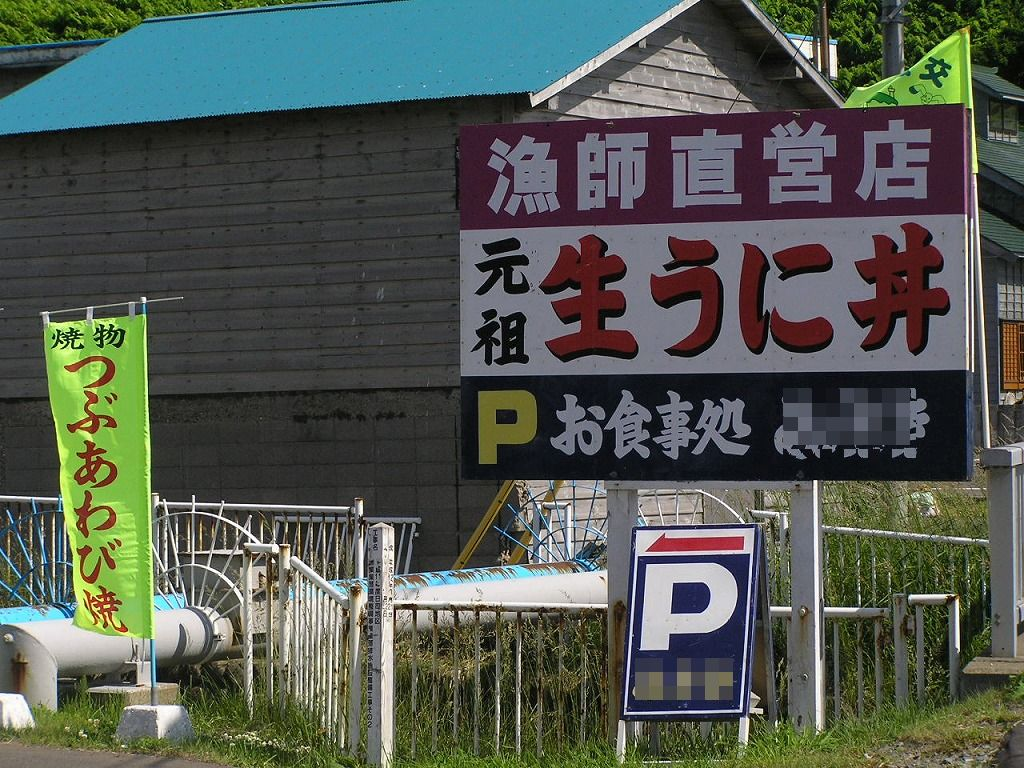
Unidon restaurant, Shakotan

The fishing industry remains an important part of the economy of Shakotan. Shakotan is noted for its catch of sea urchin (uni), squid, Olive flounder, cod, and Alaska pollock. Pork, beef, and dairy farms are located on the highland areas of the town, notably northwest of the Bikuni area of Shakotan. Small-scale farm products of the town include potatoes and kabocha, a Japanese winter squash. Tourism is an important part of the economy of Shakotan, with most tourists visiting in the summer. There is a single bank branch in Shakotan, the Bikuni Branch of the Hokkai Shinkin Bank.

== Culture ==
The Sakura-masu Salmon Sanctuary Center, located near Cape Kamui on the Yobetsu River, is an information center built to explain the ecology of the Oncorhynchus masou, cherry salmon. The center features aquariums of sakuramasu at various stages of its development. The Misaki-no-Ichiba is a traditional open-air Japanese market near Cape Shakotan. Fresh seafood and local vegetables are sold at the market from April through November. Shakotan is noted for its catch of uni, or sea urchins.

=== Festivals ===
The town of Shakotan is home to several annual festivals. The Shakotan Soran Mikaku Festival is held in June in Bikuni. An enormous vat of a local hotpot is prepared throughout the day, followed by fireworks at night. The Fire Festival is held at Bikuni Shrine from July 5 to 6. A massive statue of a tengu is passed through fire as part of a Shinto cleansing ritual.

== Recreation ==
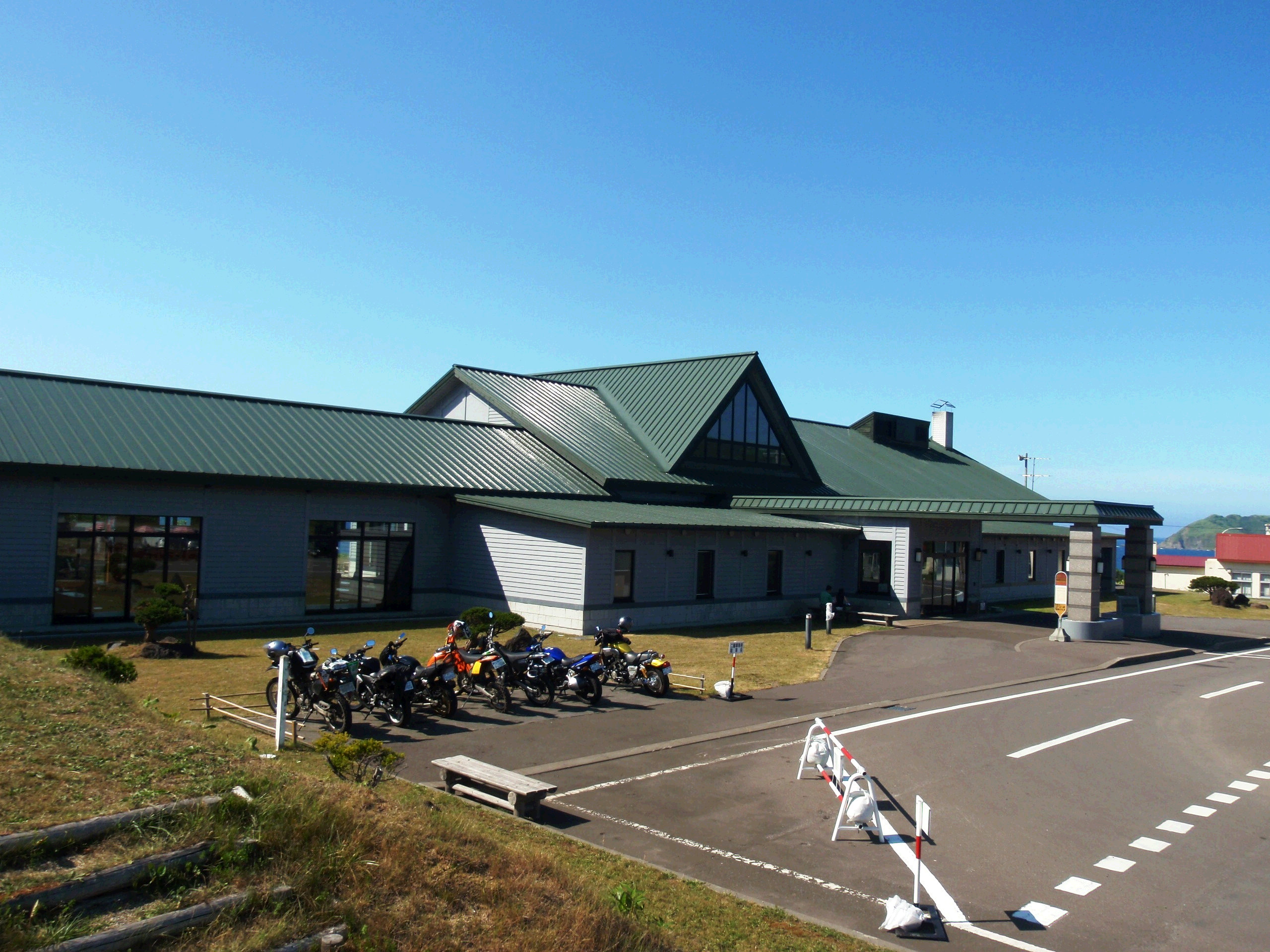
Misaki no Yu Shakotan, an onsen hot spring hotel in Shakotan

Shakotan is a popular tourist destination. The three capes, Kamui, Ōgon, and Shakotan, are popular hiking destinations. The peak of Mount Shakotan can be reached via numerous hiking trails, all beginning at Japan National Route 229. The reef areas off the coast of Shakotan, noted for the deep blue color of the water, can be viewed via glass-bottomed boats from Bikuni Harbor. Shakotan has a single primitive campground, the Hokkaido Notsuka Campsite, which is free and maintained by the town of Shakotan. The campsite is open from June through September. Recreational fishing is popular in the town, and a swimming beach is open in the town briefly during the summer from June through August.

== Government ==
Shakotan is administered from the town hall in Bikuni. The Shakotan Board of Education oversees the middle school, elementary schools, and community education centers of the town. The Shakotan Town Assembly, by law, can consist of 15 members; there are currently nine members of the assembly. Assembly members serve a four-year term. None are affiliated with a political party.

Shakotan has four post offices: one each in Bikuni, Nozuka, Irika, and Yobetsu. The town does not maintain a municipal police force. The regional police office, located in Yoichi, has branches serving the town of Shakotan in Bikuni, Irika, and Yobetsu.

== Education ==
There are no high schools or institutions of higher education in Shakotan. Two high schools are accessible by public transportation from Shakotan: the prefectural Hokkaidō Yoichi Kōshi High School and the private Hokuseigakuen Yoichi High School, both in the nearby city of Yoichi.

The Town of Shakotan Board of Education maintains one middle school: Bikuni Middle School, and four elementary schools: Bikuni Elementary School, Hizuka Elementary School, Nozuka Elementary School, and Yobetsu Elementary School. The town maintains two nursery schools: Bikuni Nursery School and Minato Nursery School.

== Transportation ==
=== Public transport ===
Shakotan is not connected by rail to other areas of Hokkaido. The town is connected to nearby Otaru and the prefectural capitol Sapporo by Hokkaidō Chūō Bus Company. The Bikuni area of Shakotan can be reached by bus in 75 minutes from the JR Hokkaido Otaru Station.

=== Highways ===
Japan National Route 229, a national highway of Japan, runs through the east of Shakotan and connects the town to Otaru and Esashi. Japan National Route 229 was completed in 1971. Hokkaidō Prefectural Route 568 connects Funama and Mikuni, both within the town of Shakotan. Hokkaidō Prefectural Route 913 runs along the coastline of the Shakotan Peninsula between Nozuka and Fumi, and provides access to many sightseeing locations in the town, notably Cape Kamui.

== Noted places ==
The Bikuni Shrine was founded in 1725 as Inari Shrine in the Kodomari area of Shakotan, and renamed Bikuni Shrine in 1892. In 1911, numerous other small Inari shrines in the Shakotan area were absorbed into Bikuni Shrine. In 1914 the shrine structures were moved in their entirety to their present-day location in the central Bikuni area of Shakotan. The festival of Bikuni Shrine is held annually from July 5 to 6. Kamui Shrine, located in the hilly forested areas of Raikishi west of the port of Yobetsu, was established in the 19th century. The shrine, after absorbing several smaller Inari shrines around Yobetsu, was rebuilt in 1931 using hinoki cypress from Aomori Prefecture. The festival of Kamui Shrine is held annually on July 17.

== Sister city ==
The town of Shakotan has a sister city relationship with the city of Seaside, Oregon, in the United States.

- Seaside, Oregon, in the United States

== Footnotes ==
A.Cape Ōgon is also known as Cape Kannon; the latter name is less frequently used.
