= Makari =

Makari may refer to:

== Places ==
- Makari, Cameroon, a town on Lake Chad
- Makari, Guyana, a community in Potaro-Siparuni, Guyana
- Makari Gbanti, a chiefdom of Bombali District in Sierra Leone
- Makari, Bombali, a village in Bombali District, northern Sierra Leone
- Makari, Tonkolili, a village in Tonkolili District, northern Sierra Leone

== People ==
- Makari Paige (born 2002), American football player
- Abdel Messih El-Makari (1892-1963), Coptic Orthodox monk and priest, and a Coptic saint
- Farid Makari (1947–2022), Lebanese politician, former Vice-President of Parliament
- George Makari (born 1960), historian, psychiatrist, and psychoanalyst

== Music ==
- Makari is an American rock band from Orlando, Florida.

== See also ==
- Makary (disambiguation)
- Makkari (disambiguation)
- Makar (disambiguation)
- Makati, a town in the Philippines
- Makira, an island in the Solomon Islands
