= Ulanga =

Ulanga may refer to

- Ulanga River, a river of central Tanzania
- Ulanga District, a district of central Tanzania
- Ulanga, Morogoro, a village in Kilosa District, Tanzania
- Ulanga, Mbeya, a village in Mbarali District, Tanzania
- Boma ya Ulanga, a village in Morogoro Region, Tanzania
