= Niseko =

Resort area in Hokkaido, Japan

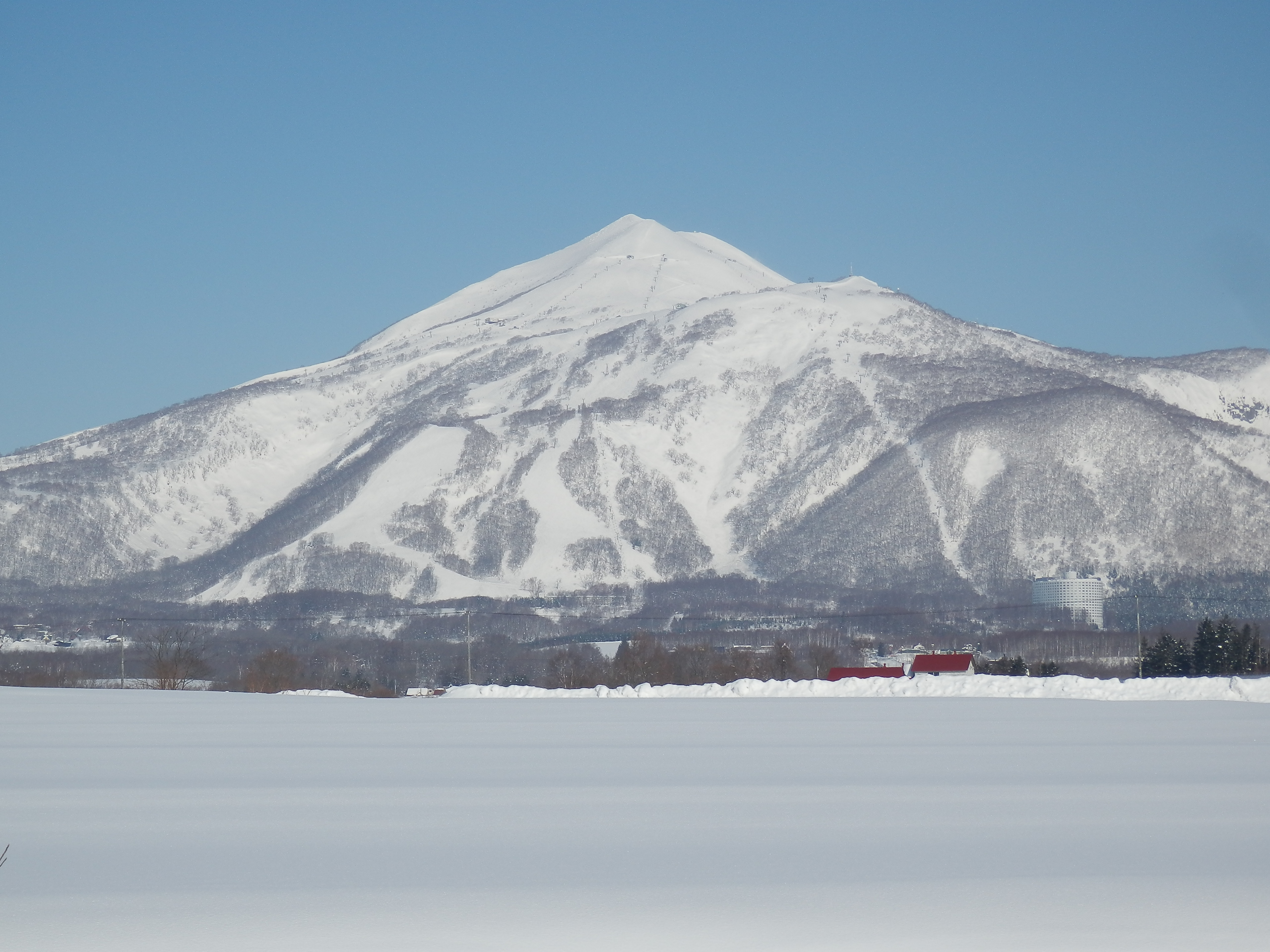
Niseko Annupuri

Niseko (Japanese: ニセコ, Niseko, [ɲ̟iseko]) is a resort area located in Hokkaido, Japan. Officially called the Niseko Tourism Zone (ニセコ観光圏), it consists of three towns: Kutchan Town, Niseko Town, and Rankoshi Town at the foot of Niseko Annupuri.

The name Niseko is derived from the Nisekoanbetsu River (ニセコアンベツ川), meaning "river toward the cliff" in the Ainu language.

Niseko is famous for its high-quality powder snowfall, known as "Japow," and has recently been developed as an international ski resort area.

== Resort ==
Niseko has a total of six ski areas, in order of size:

1. Niseko Tokyu Grand Hirafu
2. Niseko Village (formerly known as Niseko Higashiyama)
3. Niseko Annupuri
4. Niseko Hanazono
5. Niseko Moiwa
6. Niseko Weiss (Closed)

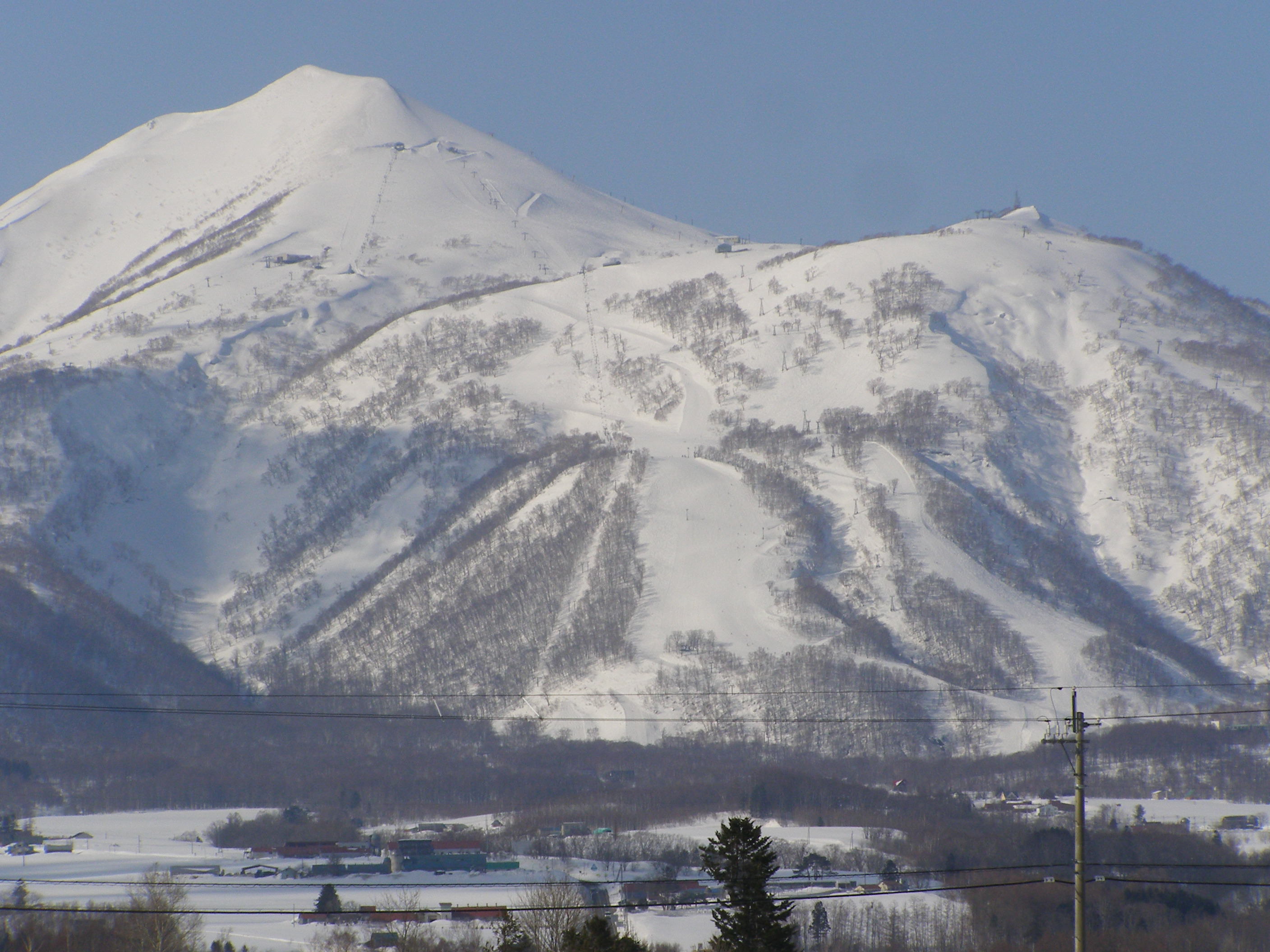
Niseko Higashiyama Ski Site from Town of Niseko

Niseko Tokyu Grand Hirafu, Niseko Hanazono and the now defunct Niseko Weiss are within the municipality of nearby Kutchan. Niseko Village, Niseko Annupuri, and Niseko Moiwa are within the adjacent municipality of Niseko.

The four main of these six ski areas (Annupuri, Higashiyama, Hirafu, and Hanazono) are sequentially interconnected and may be skied on one ski pass. The lift systems are owned respectively by the Chuo Bus company, YTL Resorts (which purchased Niseko Village from Citigroup in 2010), Tokyu Corporation, and Pacific Century Premium Developments. Together they form 8.87 km^{2} (2,191 acres) skiable of what is known as Niseko United. The lift system comprises 38 gondolas and lifts connecting 61 ski runs and 12 terrain parks. Kutchan's sister city is St. Moritz, and they have a relationship established in 1964. Niseko Moiwa, adjacent to Annupuri, can be skied to from Annupuri but is not currently connected by the lift system. Niseko Weiss has not operated its lifts for decades, but people can still ski in this area, which is being taken uphill by snowcats.

Chisenupuri Ski Resort, located in Rankoshi first opened in 1977 with a single lift, day lodge, and small hotel near YukiChichibu Onsen. Declining visitor numbers and ageing infrastructure led to its closure in 2012. The area now operates as a cat-skiing destination offering guided and unguided access to the former ski slopes.

Niseko also has backcountry ski courses that are not considered part of the resorts, but are accessible via a gate system. Access to these areas is governed by the Niseko Rules which are enforced by cooperation between ski patrol teams from each resort. Mount Yōtei is also a popular mountain for backcountry skiing expeditions.

In March 2008, Niseko was voted into the world's top 10 ski resorts for the first time. Coming in at No. 6, it was the highest ranked of the new entries in the poll.

Known initially primarily for winter sports, Niseko has gradually gained a reputation as a center for various summer activities, including golf, tennis, fishing, horseback riding, sea kayaking, white water rafting, trekking, and bicycling.

Niseko has also become well known for its hot springs (onsen), diverse culinary choices, and exceptional whiskeys.

== Infrastructure and development ==
Significant infrastructure development – initially focused on the road heating and redevelopment of the main street "Hirafu-zaka" was completed in 2016, as well as removing the overhead power lines and relocating them underground.

Both foreign-owned and Japanese companies have made significant private developments in the area in the form of hotels, condominiums and private holiday homes. Purchase demand has expanded from Australian markets, including Hong Kong, Singapore, and mainland China.

Nightlife and accommodation can be found across the district. The Hirafu area is home to the highest number of accommodations, restaurants, bars and shopping facilities as well as hotels and much of the district's condominium-style accommodation.

== See also ==
- Shikotsu-Tōya National Park
- Niseko-Shakotan-Otaru Kaigan Quasi-National Park
