= Niseko Tokyu Grand HIRAFU =

Ski resort in Kutchan, Hokkaido, Japan

Coordinates: 42.863458°N 140.698059°E

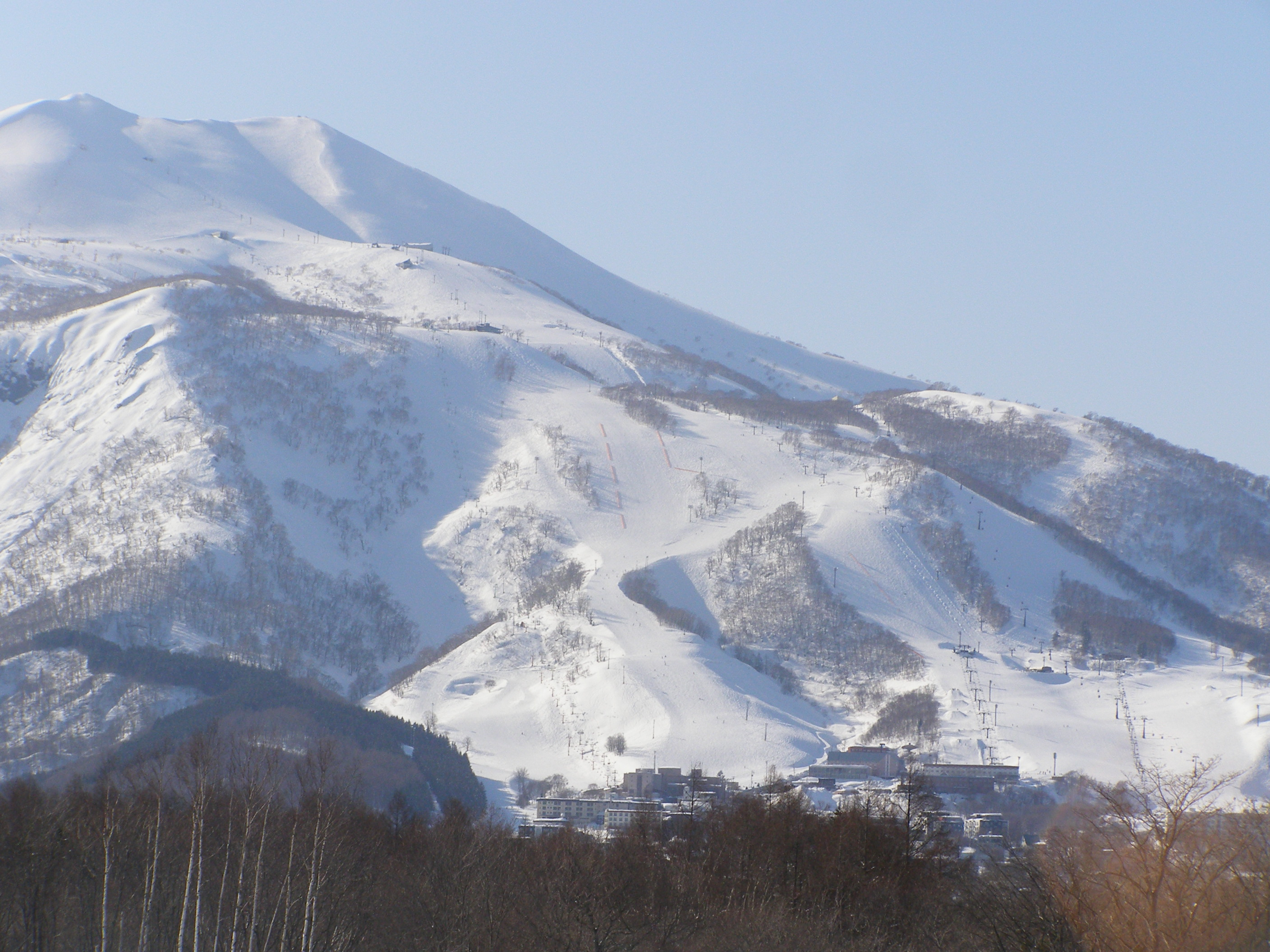
- Interactive map of Niseko Tokyu Grand HIRAFU
- Location: Kutchan, Hokkaidō, Japan
- Nearest city: Otaru, Hokkaidō; Sapporo, Hokkaidō
- Vertical: 940 m (3,084 ft)
- Top elevation: 1,200 m (3,937 ft)
- Base elevation: 260 m (853 ft)
- Skiable area: 325 ha (803.1 acres)
- Trails: 30
- Longest run: 5,600 m (18,400 ft)
- Lift system: 16 (1 gondola lift, 5 quad chairlifts, and 1 triple chairlifts, 8 pair chairlifts and 1 single chairlift)
- Website: NISEKO TOKYU Grand Hirafu website

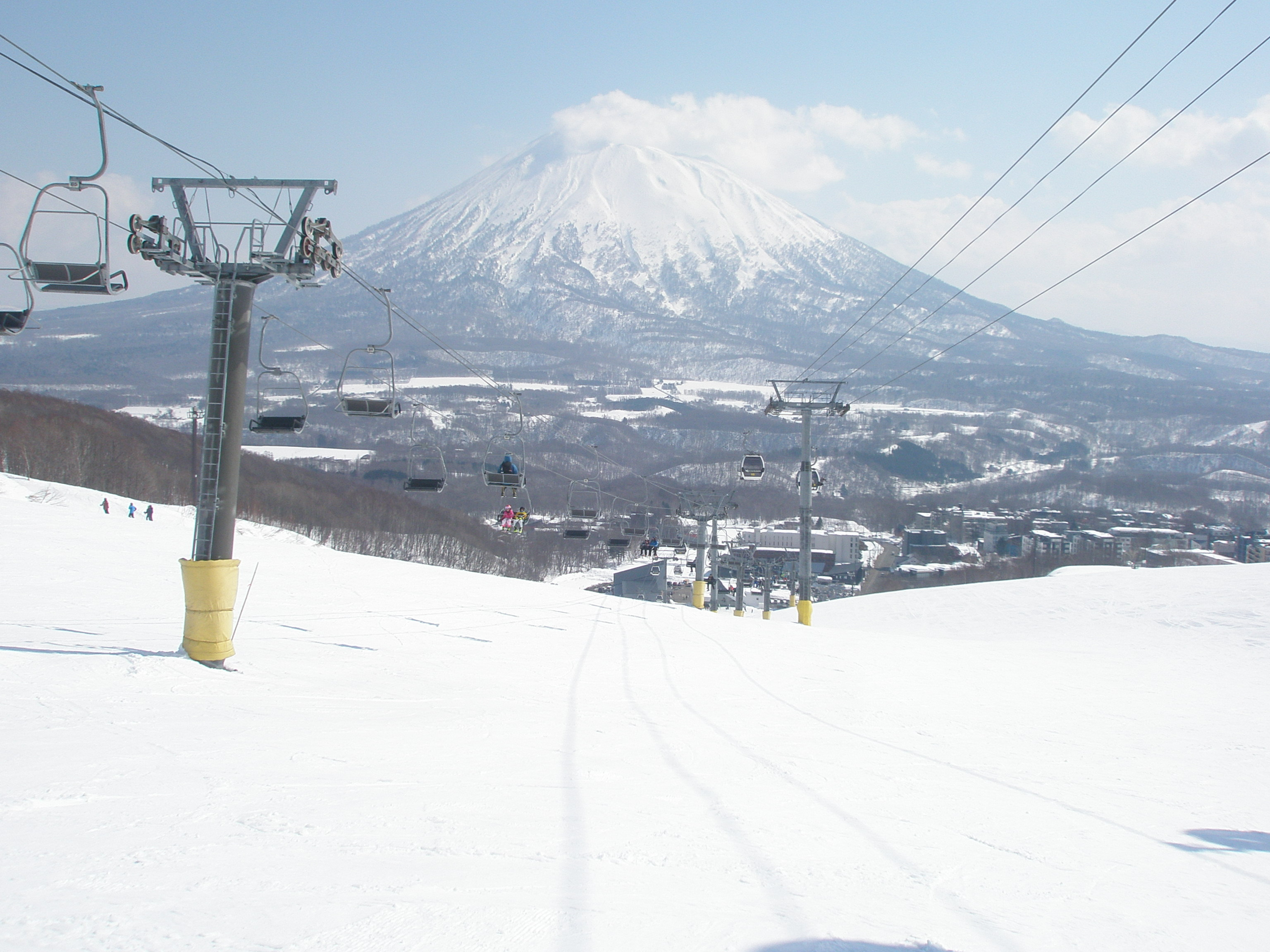
（2009）

Niseko Tokyu Grand HIRAFU (ニセコ東急 グラン・ヒラフ, Niseko Tokyu Guran Hirafu) is a ski resort located in the Hirafu area of Kutchan, Abuta District, Hokkaidō, Hokkaidō, Japan. It is a vast snow resort stretching from Niseko Annupuri’s summit (elevation 1,308.5 m) to its base, and it is famous for its fine-quality powder snow. Because of this, Hirafu is frequented by many non-Japanese skiers and snowboarders.

For a long time, two companies operated the mountain, but in June 2004 it was arranged that the three ski resorts of the Niseko Hirafu area would be administered by the Tokyu Resort Service; Tokyu Real Estate Company, the parent company of the Tokyu Resort Service, wished to consolidate ownership to one organization.

In August 2004, it was announced that an Australian company called Japan Harmony Resort purchased the Hanazono ski area from Tokyu Real Estate. However, so far the two have jointly administered such services as lift tickets. Because of this relationship and the subsequent development of the whole resort, the mountain attracts a large number Australian tourists every winter.

Niseko Higashiyama Ski Ground and Niseko Annupuri International Ski Ground are connected with Grand Hirafu at the top of the mountain, and it is possible to access all three of the slopes by using a special lift ticket called the Niseko Free Passport.

== History ==
- 1923: (circa) Founded by a member of the Sapporo Railway Bureau.
- 1938: January 14, hosts the All-Japan Student Ski Tournament
- 1961: Ski lifts completed
- 1993: December, electronic lift ticket system debuts (a joint venture of Fuji Electric, Kashiyama Engineering and Yamatake Honeywell)
- 2003: November, electronic lift ticket system upgrades to SKIDATA
- 2004: Name changes to “Niseko Mt. Resort Grand Hirafu”
- 2021: Name changes to "Niseko Tokyu Grand HIRAFU"

== Open Season ==
The lifts run from the end of November until the beginning of May.

== Access ==
=== Air ===
The most accessible airport in the region is New Chitose Airport. During the skiing season, both Hokkaido Chuo Bus and Donan Bus routes directly to Hirafu from the airport. Also, it is possible to book charter buses (such as Hokkaido Liner and White Liner) from a collaboration of tour groups.

=== Rail ===
- An rapid Airport train runs from New Chitose Airport to Sapporo Station (or Otaru Station).
- From Otaru Station on the Hakodate Main Line, the train to Kutchan Station takes approximately 78 minutes. From Kutchan Station, a taxi ride to the resort takes approximately 15 minutes and costs about 2,600 yen (bus, approximately 20 minutes).
- In open season, a special express train runs from Sapporo Station.

=== Car ===
- From Sapporo
  - Take Route 230 (Jouzankei Highway) towards Kyōgoku
  - Take Route 5
  - Drive on Hokkaidō Route 343 (Rankoshi~Niseko~Kutchan) for 1.5 hours
- From New Chitose Airport
  - Take Route 276 towards Kyōgoku
  - Take Route 5
  - Take Hokkaidō Route 343 (Rankoshi~Niseko~Kutchan) for 2 hours.

== Course ==
- There are three main differentiable courses:
  - Alpen Course
  - Kougen Course
  - Hanazono Course
