= Kyōgoku, Hokkaido =

Town in Hokkaido, Japan

Kyōgoku 京極町
- Town
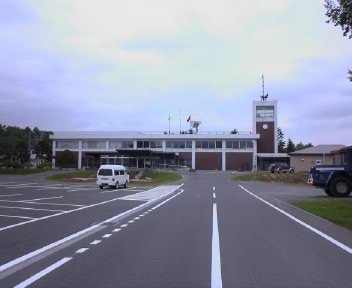
- Kyōgoku town office

- Flag Emblem

- Location of Kyōgoku in Hokkaido (Shiribeshi Subprefecture)

- Location in Japan
- Coordinates: 42°51′N 140°53′E
- Country: Japan
- Region: Hokkaido
- Prefecture: Hokkaido (Shiribeshi Subprefecture)
- District: Abuta District

Area
  - Total: 231.61 km^{2} (89.43 sq mi)

Population (September 2016)
  - Total: 3,144
  - Density: 13.57/km^{2} (35.16/sq mi)
- Time zone: UTC+09:00 (JST)
- City hall address: 527 Kyōgoku, Kyōgoku-chō, Abuta-gun, Hokkaidō; 044-0101
- Website: www.town-kyogoku.jp

Kyōgoku (京極町, Kyōgoku-chō) is a town located in Shiribeshi Subprefecture, Hokkaido, Japan. Kyōgoku sits at the eastern foot of Mount Yōtei, an active stratovolcano volcano which dominates the skyline of the town.

The town borders the south ward (Minami-ku) of Sapporo, but car traffic from Kyōgoku must drive over an hour through the Nakayama Toge mountain pass to enter Sapporo.

Tourists visit the town to drink the spring water in Fukidashi Park, where the water from Mount Yōtei bubbles out of the ground.

The town has a sister city relationship with the city of Marugame in Kagawa Prefecture.

== Geography ==
Kyōgoku is mountainous, with several peaks above 1,000 metres (3,300 ft). The town sits between Mount Yotei to the east, and Mount Muine (1,464 metres (4,803 ft)), Mount Nakadake 1,387.8 metres (4,553 ft), and Mount Kimobetsu (1,176.9 metres (3,861 ft)) to the west.

The Shiribetsu River (126 kilometres (78 mi)), which emerges from Lake Shikotsu to the south, runs through Kyōgoku between Mount Yotei and the western peaks in the town. The river eventually flows into the Sea of Japan.

=== Neighboring municipalities ===
- Ishikari Subprefecture:
  - Sapporo (Minami-ku)
- Shiribeshi Subprefecture:
  - Yoichi District: Akaigawa
  - Abuta District: Kutchan
  - Abuta District: Kimobetsu
  - The town also borders Niseko and Makkari at a single point at the top of Mount Yōtei.

== History ==
Kyōgoku was first settled by the Japanese in 1897. Takanori Kyōgoku (1858–1928) was a former noble of the Kyōgoku clan and head of the Marugame Domain, Sanuki Province in present-day Kagawa Prefecture, Shikoku. Kyōgoku was given permission to set up an agricultural operation in the area, as part of Kutchan.

- 1898, 1899, 1900 - Three waves of settlement from Ishikawa Prefecture and Toyama Prefecture
- 1910 - With a population of 6,783, the new settlement becomes a separate village called Higashikutchan.
- 1940 - The village is renamed Kyōgoku.
- 1962 - Kyōgoku becomes a town.

== Transportation ==
=== Public transport ===
Kyōgoku is not connected by rail to other areas of Hokkaido. The town was formerly a stop on the Japanese National Railways (JR) Iburi Line which ceased operation in 1986.

=== Highways ===
Japan National Route 227, a national highway of Japan, runs through the east of Kyōgoku and connects the town to Hakodate and Esashi.

== Education ==
Elementary schools:

- Kyōgoku Elementary School
- Minami Kyōgoku Elementary School (permanently closed)

Junior high school:

- Kyōgoku Junior High School

== Annual events ==
- Town recreation day - summer and winter
- Attakai festival - held in March
- Fukidashi choral singing festival - held in July on the outdoor stage in Fukidashi park
- Shakkoi festival - also held in July in Fukidashi park
- Furusato festival - held during the Obon season in August on the main shopping street

== Sister city ==
Marugame in Kagawa Prefecture, Japan

== Notable people from Kyōgoku ==
- Akira Satō, ski jumper
