= Masongbon =

Coordinates: 8°49′N 11°57′W

- Interactive map of Masongbon
- Country: Sierra Leone
- Province: Northern Province
- District: Bombali District
- Chiefdom: Makari Gbanti
- Time zone: UTC±00:00 (GMT)
- UFI: -1319242

Masongbon (Masungbo, Musumbu) is a small town and seat of the chiefdom of Makari Gbanti in Bombali District in the Northern Province of Sierra Leone.
