= Kutchan, Hokkaido =

Kutchan 倶知安町
- Town
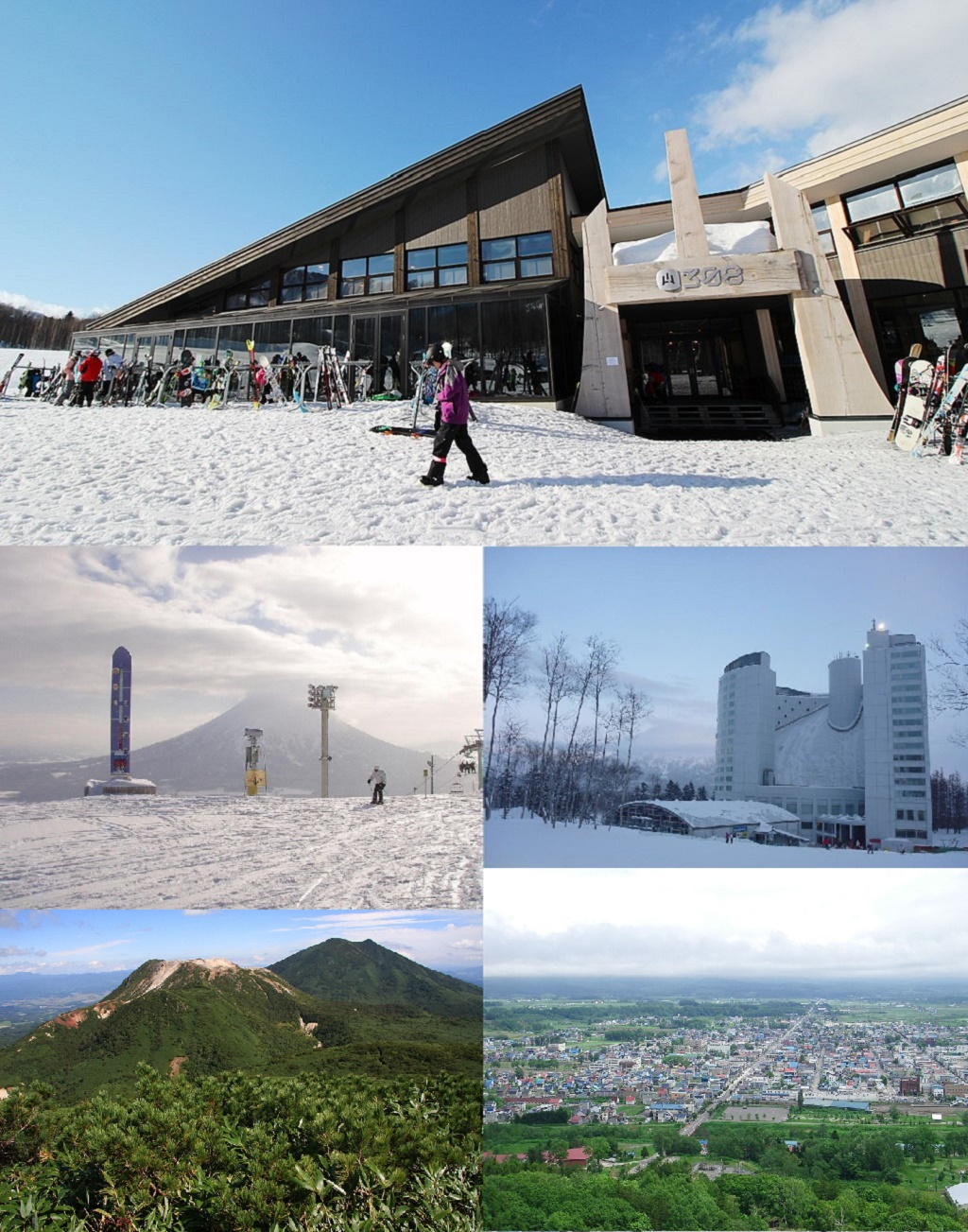

- Flag Emblem

- Location of Kutchan in Hokkaido (Shiribeshi Subprefecture)

- Location in Japan
- Coordinates: 42°54′N 140°46′E
- Country: Japan
- Region: Hokkaido
- Prefecture: Hokkaido (Shiribeshi Subprefecture)
- District: Abuta

Area
  - Total: 261.24 km^{2} (100.87 sq mi)

Population (April 30, 2017)
  - Total: 15,573
  - Density: 59.612/km^{2} (154.39/sq mi)
- Time zone: UTC+09:00 (JST)
- City hall address: 3-3 Kita-ichijō-higashi, Kutchan-chō, Abuta-gun, Hokkaidō; 044-0001
- Climate: Dfb
- Website: www.town.kutchan.hokkaido.jp
- Symbols
- Flower: Rhododendron
- Mascot: Jagata-kun and Jagako-chan
- Tree: Painted Maple

Kutchan (倶知安町, Kutchan-chō) is a town located in Shiribeshi Subprefecture, Hokkaido, Japan. Kutchan lies slightly north of the volcano Mount Yōtei, and is approximately 50 kilometers west of Sapporo. The subprefecture government offices are located in this town, making it the capital of the subprefecture.

As of April 30, 2017, the town has an estimated population of 15,573 and a population density of 60 persons per km². The total area is 261.24 km^{2} (100.87 sq mi).

Throughout Hokkaido, Kutchan is known for its proximity to the world famous Niseko powder snow region and for its production of quality potatoes and potato products. Among these products, Kutchan is most famous for manufacturing gosetsu-udon, a Japanese noodle made from potato flour. Jagata-kun, the skiing potato that is the cartoon mascot of Kutchan, indicates Kutchan's two most celebrated aspects. Jagata-kun roughly translates as, "little, fat potato boy".

== Geography ==
- Located approximately 50 km (31 mi) west of Sapporo. Kutchan lies in a valley surrounded by mountains, notably Niseko Annupuri and Mount Yōtei.

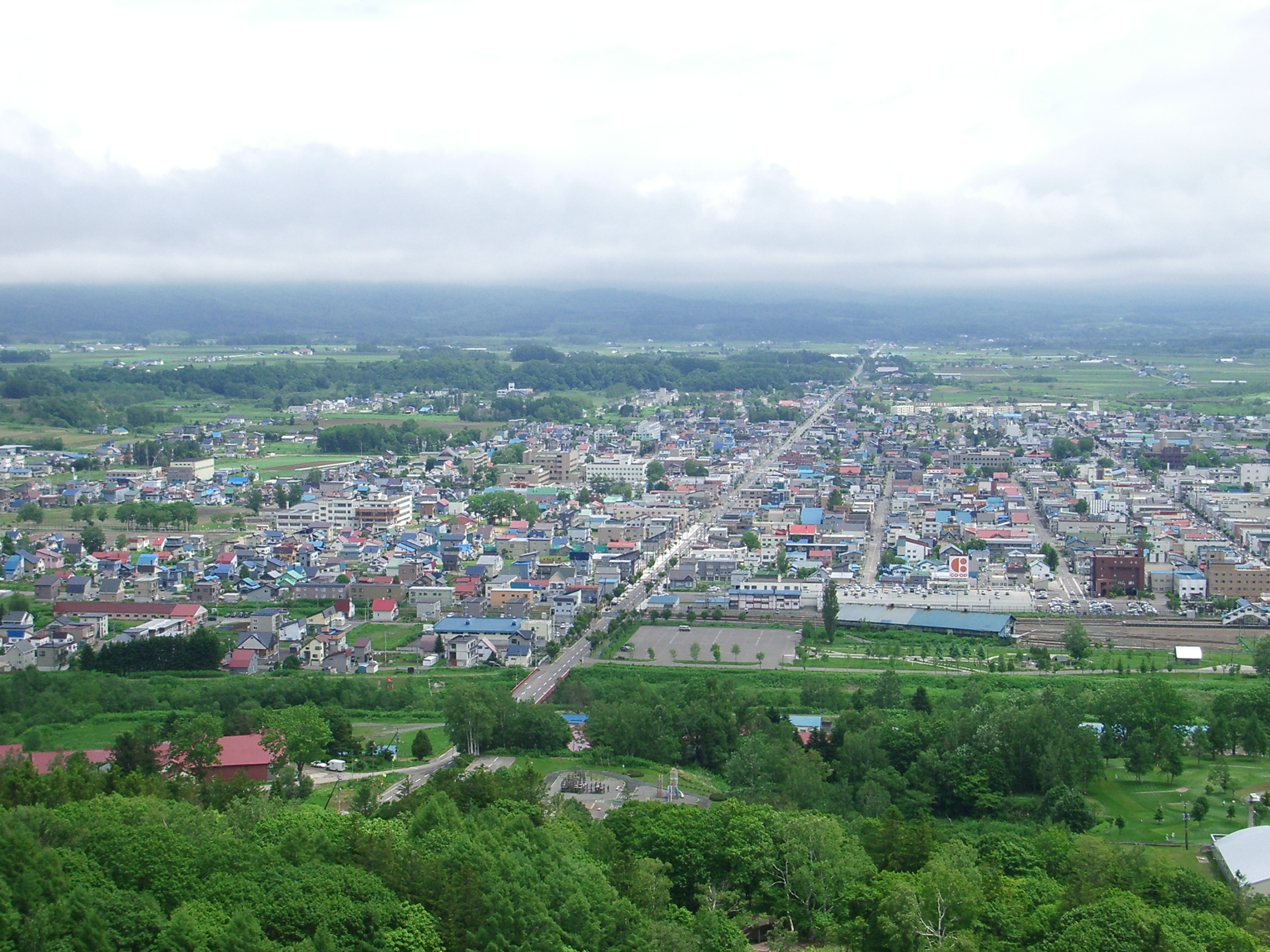
Kutchan as seen from Asahigaoka Park

- Mountains: Yōtei (Shiribeshi Mountain) (Makkari-Nupuri in Ainu) (active volcano, 1898 m), Niseko Iwaonupuri (active volcano, 1116 m), Niseko Annupuri (1308 m)
- Rivers: Shiribetsu, Kutōzan

=== Climate ===
Kutchan has the distinction of being one of the snowiest towns on earth, with average annual snowfalls in excess of 10 m (33 ft). At only 176 m (577 ft) above sea level the town receives greater amounts of snow than the world's leading ski areas such as Whistler, Aspen or Chamonix. Wintery weather lasts from early November through to early April with the snowiest month being January which averages 2.9 m (9.5 ft). January is also the coldest month averaging −5.7 °C (21.7 °F). Kutchan has 4 very distinct seasons with reasonably short spring and autumn periods. The summer is mild with temperatures rarely getting above 30 °C (86 °F) and the humidity that afflicts much of Asia at this time is only felt for a short period, usually in August.

Climate data for Kutchan, Hokkaido (1991−2020 normals, extremes 1944−present)
| Month | Jan | Feb | Mar | Apr | May | Jun | Jul | Aug | Sep | Oct | Nov | Dec | Year |
|---|---|---|---|---|---|---|---|---|---|---|---|---|---|
| Record high °C (°F) | 8.7 (47.7) | 13.1 (55.6) | 14.4 (57.9) | 24.5 (76.1) | 32.5 (90.5) | 32.5 (90.5) | 34.1 (93.4) | 34.6 (94.3) | 32.0 (89.6) | 26.8 (80.2) | 20.0 (68.0) | 12.5 (54.5) | 34.6 (94.3) |
| Mean maximum °C (°F) | 4.2 (39.6) | 5.5 (41.9) | 10.1 (50.2) | 18.9 (66.0) | 25.8 (78.4) | 27.6 (81.7) | 29.8 (85.6) | 30.7 (87.3) | 27.6 (81.7) | 21.2 (70.2) | 15.6 (60.1) | 8.0 (46.4) | 31.5 (88.7) |
| Mean daily maximum °C (°F) | −2.0 (28.4) | −1.0 (30.2) | 3.0 (37.4) | 9.8 (49.6) | 16.9 (62.4) | 20.9 (69.6) | 24.4 (75.9) | 25.4 (77.7) | 21.7 (71.1) | 15.0 (59.0) | 6.9 (44.4) | 0.0 (32.0) | 11.8 (53.2) |
| Daily mean °C (°F) | −5.4 (22.3) | −4.9 (23.2) | −1.0 (30.2) | 4.9 (40.8) | 11.2 (52.2) | 15.6 (60.1) | 19.7 (67.5) | 20.6 (69.1) | 16.4 (61.5) | 9.7 (49.5) | 2.9 (37.2) | −3.1 (26.4) | 7.2 (45.0) |
| Mean daily minimum °C (°F) | −9.6 (14.7) | −9.4 (15.1) | −5.7 (21.7) | 0.1 (32.2) | 6.0 (42.8) | 11.3 (52.3) | 16.1 (61.0) | 16.7 (62.1) | 11.3 (52.3) | 4.5 (40.1) | −1.0 (30.2) | −6.8 (19.8) | 2.8 (37.0) |
| Mean minimum °C (°F) | −19.1 (−2.4) | −18.6 (−1.5) | −14.6 (5.7) | −6.4 (20.5) | 0.0 (32.0) | 5.5 (41.9) | 10.7 (51.3) | 10.4 (50.7) | 4.2 (39.6) | −1.5 (29.3) | −7.7 (18.1) | −15.5 (4.1) | −20.5 (−4.9) |
| Record low °C (°F) | −35.7 (−32.3) | −28.7 (−19.7) | −28.8 (−19.8) | −18.6 (−1.5) | −4.8 (23.4) | 0.1 (32.2) | 4.6 (40.3) | 4.8 (40.6) | −1.3 (29.7) | −8.9 (16.0) | −22.0 (−7.6) | −27.0 (−16.6) | −35.7 (−32.3) |
| Average precipitation mm (inches) | 184.5 (7.26) | 129.4 (5.09) | 98.3 (3.87) | 67.1 (2.64) | 75.8 (2.98) | 59.9 (2.36) | 102.3 (4.03) | 153.1 (6.03) | 133.3 (5.25) | 128.2 (5.05) | 182.8 (7.20) | 217.7 (8.57) | 1,532.3 (60.33) |
| Average snowfall cm (inches) | 253 (100) | 187 (74) | 122 (48) | 17 (6.7) | 0 (0) | 0 (0) | 0 (0) | 0 (0) | 0 (0) | 2 (0.8) | 95 (37) | 253 (100) | 921 (363) |
| Average rainy days (≥ 1.0 mm) | 24.5 | 21.3 | 17.0 | 11.0 | 9.8 | 8.0 | 8.6 | 9.9 | 11.9 | 14.3 | 19.9 | 24.7 | 180.9 |
| Average snowy days (≥ 1 cm) | 26.3 | 23.4 | 20.3 | 7.5 | 0 | 0 | 0 | 0 | 0 | 0.5 | 11.7 | 25.2 | 114.9 |
| Average relative humidity (%) | 82 | 80 | 75 | 72 | 74 | 80 | 83 | 84 | 82 | 79 | 80 | 83 | 79 |
| Mean monthly sunshine hours | 47.0 | 65.1 | 121.1 | 173.3 | 189.9 | 169.7 | 144.5 | 149.5 | 149.3 | 127.8 | 65.5 | 38.8 | 1,441.4 |
Source 1: Japan Meteorological Agency
Source 2: Japan Meteorological Agency

=== Neighboring municipalities ===
Shiribeshi

- Abuta District: Kyōgoku, Niseko
- Isoya District: Rankoshi
- Iwanai District: Kyōwa
- Yoichi District: Niki, Akaigawa
- Kimobetsu and Makkari of the Abuta District lie on the southern side of Mount Yōtei.

== Etymology ==
Kutchan's name comes from the language of the native Ainu people. It attempts to mimic the pronunciation of the Ainu word ku-shan-i (which roughly translates as “the place where the channel flows”), but some claim that the name is derived from kucha-an-nai (“stream of a hunting lodge”).

== History ==
In 1892 cultivation began by people from Tokushima Prefecture who had settled in nearby Yoichi. In 1893 the village of Kutchan was established, falling under the jurisdiction of the Abuta village town office (present-day Tōyako). The town office of Kutchan opened in 1896. In 1899 its jurisdiction changed from Muroran Subprefecture (present-day Iburi Subprefecture) to Iwanai Subprefecture. From 1906 it was administered as a second-level municipality. On February 8, 1910 Rusutsu, Iwanai, and Otaru’s subprefectures were consolidated into Abuta District of Muroran Subprefecture. Shiribeshi Subprefecture was established in Kutchan. On April 5, the satellite village of East Kutchan (present-day Kyōgoku) was formed. Nisekoan, Higa, and the Fujizan area become part of the Shutai village administration zone (present-day Niseko) From 1916 it was administered as a town-level municipality In 1991 its centenary was celebrated.

== Economy ==
=== Agriculture ===
Along with short grain white rice, much of Kutchan's surrounding area is devoted to potato cultivation.

=== Tourism ===
Tourism is a dominant industry in Kutchan, supported by its location at the base of Mount Niseko Annupuri and its role as part of the larger Niseko United ski area. Two of the four Niseko United resorts — Niseko Tokyu Grand Hirafu and Niseko Hanazono — are located within Kutchan’s municipal boundaries. These resorts are internationally recognised for their deep, dry powder snow and have become central to the region’s visitor economy.

Kutchan recorded approximately 1.3 million visitors in 2023, including around 573,000 international tourists and 296,000 domestic visitors. Around 80% of winter guests were from overseas, making Kutchan one of Japan’s most internationally visited ski destinations.

Tourism contributes significantly to Kutchan’s local economy through employment, accommodation, dining, and property development. The influx of foreign visitors and investment has spurred infrastructure improvements and new business opportunities, while also leading to higher real estate values and increased demand for housing and public services.

In summer, outdoor activities such as hiking, cycling, and rafting are available in the Kutchan area, which are promoted in order to diversify tourism beyond the winter season.

== Education ==
=== Public High Schools ===
- Hokkaido Kutchan High School
- Hokkaido Kutchan Agriculture High School

=== Middle schools ===
- Kutchan

=== Elementary schools ===
- Kutchan, Hokuyo, Higashi, Nishi, Kabayama Branch School

== Transportation ==
=== Airways ===
==== Airport ====
- New Chitose Airport is the closest major airport to the town, about 2 hours away by car.

=== Railways ===
- JR Hokkaido
  - Hakodate Main Line: Hirafu Station – Kutchan Station
- Formerly, the Iburi Line served Kutchan from Datemombetsu Station of the Muroran Main Line, but it was discontinued in 1986.
- JR Hokkaido plans to include Kutchan in its planned Hokkaido Shinkansen (bullet train) service, which would connect the town to Honshū and, consequently, Tokyo.

=== Roadways ===
==== Japan National Route ====
- Route 5
- Route 276
- Route 393

==== Prefectural highways ====
- Hokkaido Route 58 (Kutchan – Niseko)
- Hokkaido Route 271 (Kutchan stop)
- Hokkaido Route 343 (Rankoshi – Niseko – Kutchan)
- Hokkaido Route 478 (Kyogoku – Kutchan)
- Hokkaido Route 631 (Niseko – Takahara – Hirafu)

== Culture ==
As the main regional center of population, Kutchan hosts a variety of cultural institutions and events. The town is home to two museums, the Kutchan Natural History Museum and the Shu Ogawara Art Museum. It also hosts the annual Mt. Niseko Kutchan Jazz Festival every July in the center of town, drawing thousands to enjoy the music of Japanese and Australian musicians.

=== Tourism mascot ===
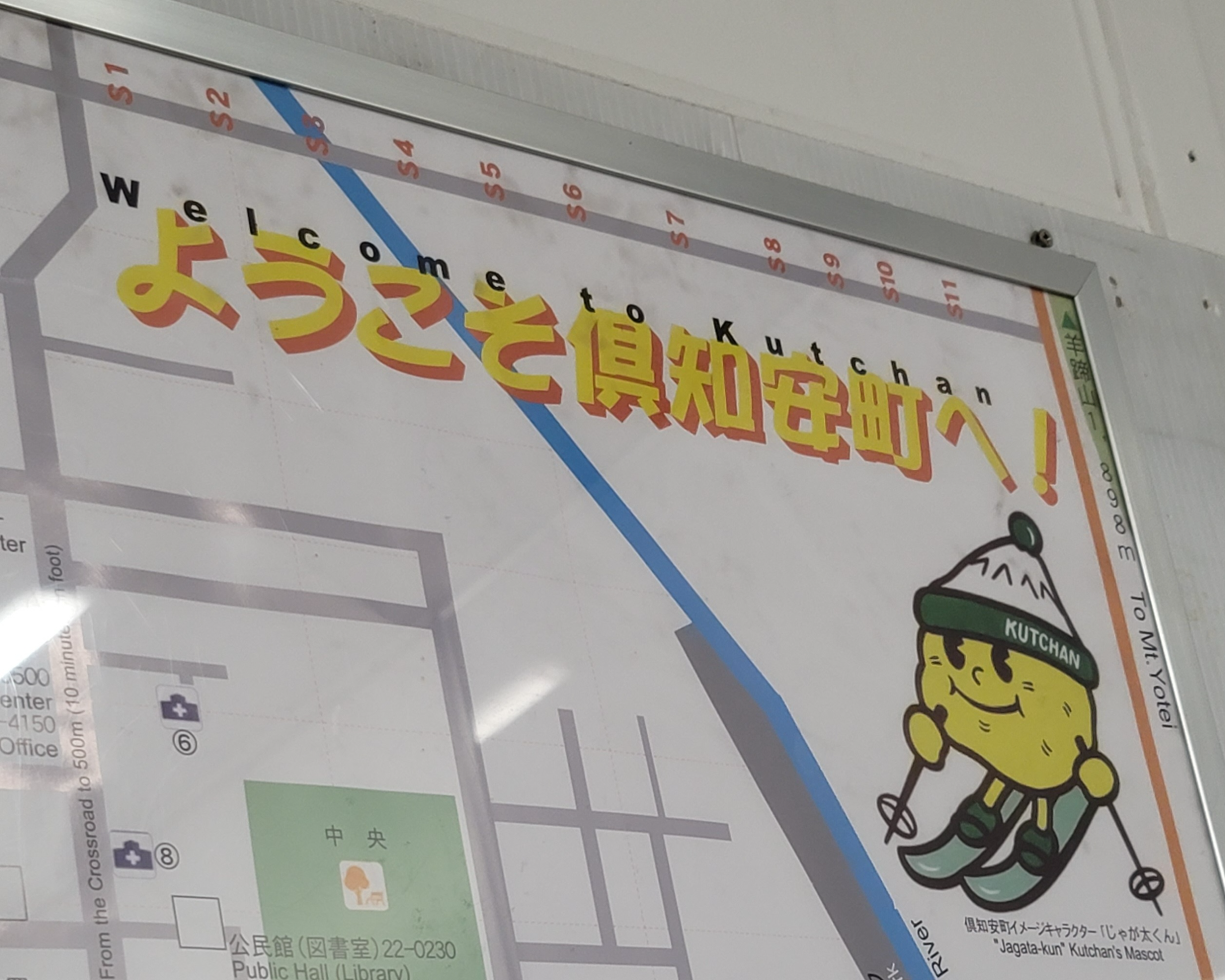
Jagata-kun, the skiing potato, pictured on a town map in Kutchan.

The town's two main industries (ski resorts and potato farming) are both reflected in its tourism mascot, a skiing potato. Jagata-kun (じゃが太くん) (male) and Jagako-chan (じゃが子ちゃん) (female) are Kutchan's mascot cartoon character. Due to the heavy snowfalls in the region, Kutchan hosts several alpine resorts frequented by domestic and international skiers and snowboarders. In the summer, Kutchan is best known for its primary agricultural product: potatoes.

== Places of interest ==
- Mount Yōtei
- Niseko Annupuri
- Niseko Mt. Resort Grand Hirafu

== Famous persons ==
- Kokona Hiraki, Olympic skateboarder
- Masami Yuki, a manga artist born and raised in Kutchan

== Sister cities ==
- St. Moritz, Switzerland, since March 19, 1964
- Vail, Colorado, United States
- Zikhron Ya'akov, Israel
- Westerland, Germany

== See also ==
- Niseko, Hokkaido
- Hokkaido Railway Company
