= The Vale Niseko =

- Interactive map of the The Vale Niseko area

General information
- Status: Completed
- Type: Serviced apartment
- Location: Hirafu Village, Niseko, Hokkaidō, Japan
- Coordinates: 42°51′N 140°42′E
- Construction started: June 2008
- Opening: December 2009
- Cost: over $20 million

Technical details
- Floor count: 7

Design and construction
- Architects: Nikken Sekkei; Nikken Space Design (interior design)
- Developer: NISADE Niseko Alpine Developments
- Structural engineer: Nikken Sekkei
- Main contractor: Nakayama Gumi

The Vale Niseko, is a ski-side serviced apartment and condo-hotel property development located on the ski run in upper Hirafu Village, in Niseko, on Japan's northern island of Hokkaidō.

Announced in 2007, it is Niseko's largest residential single complex with a total of 49 residences, outdoor heated pool, private onsen (natural thermal hot spring baths), restaurant, bar and après ski terrace. Construction began in June 2008.

== Location ==
The Vale Niseko is one of only a handful of ski-in ski-out buildings in Niseko due to the limited amount of residential land bordering the ski runs.

Sitting at the base of the Family Run and approx 120 m to the village centre, owner/developer Niseko Alpine Developments (NISADE) bought additional neighbouring land on the ski run to ensure the ski run views are preserved.

The site sits above an existing onsen from which the natural hot water is used to supply heating, water to private and public onsens throughout the building.

== Architecture ==
Architect Hokkaido Nikken Sekkei uses a non-traditional design by shaping the building around each unit's view, rather than treating the building as a whole. This allows every unit to obtain maximum possible views from every room.

As typical in Niseko, design is a fusion of Japanese and Western styling. The Vale Niseko features private onsens that look up the ski run, interior alpine stone, fireplaces, huge floor-to-ceiling glazing and Japanese-style bathrooms.

The buildings sheer size and location can be seen from almost anywhere in Hirafu Village. For this reason the façade incorporates semi-frameless glass balconies, a stone base and timber cedar paneling to represent the local alpine environs.

== Onsen ==
The building incorporates a traditional Japanese onsen with a twist. An ultra-modern design mixes with the old tradition to create a bathing experience unique only to Niseko.

Designed to relax after a days powder skiing or golf, persons can choose to use the main outdoor public onsen or the units' private onsen, both utilising the naturally-heated volcanic waters from the 700 m deep well.

== Opening ==
The Vale Niseko was completed on schedule by December 9, 2009, with the building at 100% occupancy 9 days from opening due to the popular winter season in Niseko.
