= Makary =

Makary may refer to:

== Places ==
- Makary, Cameroon, a town in Far North Region, Cameroon, on Lake Chad
  - Makary people, the Kotoko of the Lake Chad region, descended from the Kotoko kingdom
- Velyki Makary, a village in Yavoriv Raion, Lviv Oblast, Ukraine

== People ==
=== Mononym ===
"Makary", also "Makari", is a Slavic name, cognate with the Latin Macarius (the following names may appear as "Makary"):

- Macarius of Unzha (1349–1444), credited with founding four monasteries in the Middle and Upper Volga regions of Russia; Russian Orthodox saint
- Macarius, Metropolitan of Moscow (1482–1563), close adviser to Ivan the Terrible; Russian Orthodox saint
- Macarius Bulgakov (1816–1882), one of the three major church historians of the Russian Empire
- Macarius II (disambiguation)

=== Surname ===
- Marty Makary, British-American surgeon
- Ziad Makary, Lebanese politician

=== Given name ===
- Makary Younan (1934–2022), Coptic Orthodox priest

=== Middle name ===
- Józef Makary Potocki (died 1829), Polish nobleman

== See also ==
- Makari (disambiguation)
