= Kimobetsu, Hokkaido =

Kimobetsu 喜茂別町
- Town
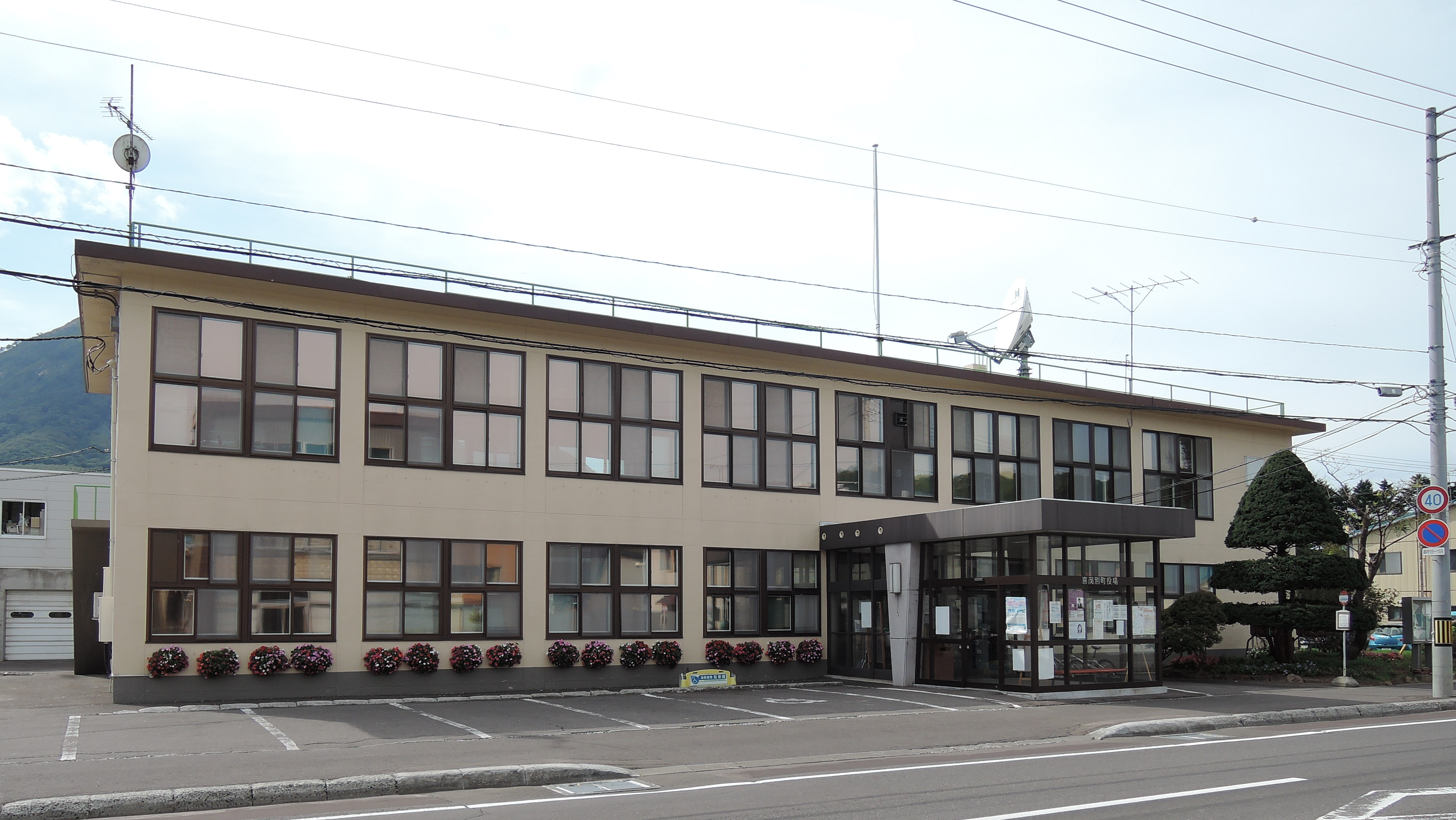
- Kimobetsu Town hall

- Flag Emblem

- Location of Kimobetsu in Hokkaido (Shiribeshi Subprefecture)

- Location in Japan
- Coordinates: 42°48′N 140°56′E
- Country: Japan
- Region: Hokkaido
- Prefecture: Hokkaido (Shiribeshi Subprefecture)
- District: Abuta

Government
  - Mayor: Noriaki Sugawara

Area
  - Total: 189.51 km^{2} (73.17 sq mi)

Population (September 30, 2016)
  - Total: 2,286
  - Density: 12.06/km^{2} (31.24/sq mi)
- Time zone: UTC+09:00 (JST)
- City hall address: 123 Kimobetsu, Kimobetsu, Abuta-gun, Hokkaido; 044-0292
- Climate: Dfb
- Website: www.town.kimobetsu.hokkaido.jp
- Symbols
- Flower: Impatiens walleriana
- Tree: Prunus sargenti

Kimobetsu (喜茂別町, Kimobetsu-chō) is a town located in Shiribeshi Subprefecture, Hokkaido, Japan.

As of September 2016, the town has an estimated population of 2,286 and a population density of 12 persons per km^{2}. The total area is 189.51 km^{2}.

== Geography ==
Route 230 and Route 276 cross each other in Kimobetsu. Nakayama Pass is on the eastern of the town.

The name derived from Ainu word "kim-o-pet", meaning "The river in the mountain".

- Mountains: Mount Yōtei, Mount Shiribetsu
- Rivers: Shiribetsu River, Kimobetsu River

=== Neighboring municipalities ===
- Iburi Subprefecture
  - Date
- Ishikari Subprefecture
  - Minami-ku, Sapporo
- Shiribeshi Subprefecture
  - Kyogoku
  - Makkari
  - Rusutsu

=== Climate ===
Due to its mountainous location, Kimobetsu has a humid continental climate (Koppen Dfb). Summers are generally warm and wet, while winters are cold and extremely snowy.

Climate data for Kimobetsu (1991–2020 normals, extremes 1978–present)
Month	Jan	Feb	Mar	Apr	May	Jun	Jul	Aug	Sep	Oct	Nov	Dec	Year
Record high °C (°F)	7.1 (44.8)	11.0 (51.8)	13.1 (55.6)	23.8 (74.8)	30.2 (86.4)	33.3 (91.9)	34.1 (93.4)	34.5 (94.1)	31.0 (87.8)	24.4 (75.9)	18.3 (64.9)	11.3 (52.3)	34.1 (93.4)
Mean daily maximum °C (°F)	−2.7 (27.1)	−1.7 (28.9)	2.2 (36.0)	8.8 (47.8)	16.5 (61.7)	20.7 (69.3)	24.1 (75.4)	24.9 (76.8)	21.0 (69.8)	14.3 (57.7)	6.3 (43.3)	−0.6 (30.9)	11.2 (52.1)
Daily mean °C (°F)	−7.2 (19.0)	−6.7 (19.9)	−2.5 (27.5)	3.5 (38.3)	10.2 (50.4)	15.0 (59.0)	19.0 (66.2)	19.6 (67.3)	15.0 (59.0)	8.2 (46.8)	1.5 (34.7)	−4.8 (23.4)	5.9 (42.6)
Mean daily minimum °C (°F)	−14.1 (6.6)	−14.0 (6.8)	−9.2 (15.4)	−2.3 (27.9)	3.7 (38.7)	9.4 (48.9)	14.4 (57.9)	14.8 (58.6)	9.2 (48.6)	2.3 (36.1)	−3.2 (26.2)	−10.3 (13.5)	0.1 (32.1)
Record low °C (°F)	−31.3 (−24.3)	−31.9 (−25.4)	−25.7 (−14.3)	−18.5 (−1.3)	−4.0 (24.8)	−1.6 (29.1)	2.4 (36.3)	4.9 (40.8)	−1.1 (30.0)	−7.3 (18.9)	−20.6 (−5.1)	−27.3 (−17.1)	−31.9 (−25.4)
Average precipitation mm (inches)	86.1 (3.39)	66.4 (2.61)	68.2 (2.69)	64.0 (2.52)	78.9 (3.11)	58.1 (2.29)	106.2 (4.18)	157.7 (6.21)	140.3 (5.52)	112.4 (4.43)	126.4 (4.98)	113.2 (4.46)	1,178 (46.38)
Average snowfall cm (inches)	238 (94)	193 (76)	143 (56)	32 (13)	0 (0)	0 (0)	0 (0)	0 (0)	0 (0)	3 (1.2)	95 (37)	244 (96)	954 (376)
Average precipitation days (≥ 1.0 mm)	20.3	17.6	16.2	11.3	10.9	9.1	10.3	11.0	12.6	14.3	17.7	21.8	173.1
Average snowy days (≥ 3 cm)	23.0	19.6	16.7	4.8	0	0	0	0	0	0.4	8.6	21.7	94.8
Mean monthly sunshine hours	46.2	57.2	99.7	153.2	183.0	170.0	141.9	144.5	150.7	125.6	68.2	34.6	1,376.3
Source: Japan Meteorological Agency

== History ==
- 1897: Makkari Village split off from Abuta Village (now Toyako Town).
- 1901: Kaributo Village (now Niseko Town) was split off from Makkari Village.
- 1906: Makkari Village became a Second Class Village.
- 1910: Makkari Village was transferred from Muroran Subprefecture (now Iburi Subprefecture) to Shiribeshi Subprefecture.
- 1917: Kimobetsu Village (now town) was split off from Makkari Village.
- 1946: Kimobetsu Village became a First Class Village.
- 1952: Kimobetsu Village became Kimobetsu Town.

== Education ==
- Junior high school
  - Kimobetsu Junior High School
- Elementary school
  - Kimobetsu Elementary School
  - Suzukawa Elementary School

== See also ==
- Shikotsu-Tōya National Park
