= Hokkaido Chuo Bus =

Bus company in Hokkaido, Japan

Hokkaido Chuo Bus Co., Ltd.
- Native name: 北海道中央バス株式会社 (Hokkaidō Chūō Basu Kabushikigaisha)
- Type: Corporation
- Industry: Bus
- Founded: March 1, 1943
- Headquarters: Otaru, Hokkaidō, Japan
- Number of locations: 1-8-6 Ironai, Otaru City, Hokkaido
- Area served: Hokkaido
- Website: www.chuo-bus.co.jp

The Hokkaido Chuo Bus Co., Ltd. (北海道中央バス株式会社, Hokkaidō Chūō Basu Kabushikigaisha) is a Japanese bus company operating local and long-distance buses in Hokkaido prefecture, Japan. The company operates routes connecting cities within Hokkaido, as well as local city and chartered bus services.

== Overview ==
Besides providing bus services within Hokkaido Prefecture, Hokkaido Chuo Bus also operates chartered buses. Its central business is transportation within the metropolitan areas of many cities in the prefecture, including Sapporo, Asahikawa, Otaru, Iwamizawa, Ishikari, Takikawa, and Eniwa.

=== Business offices ===
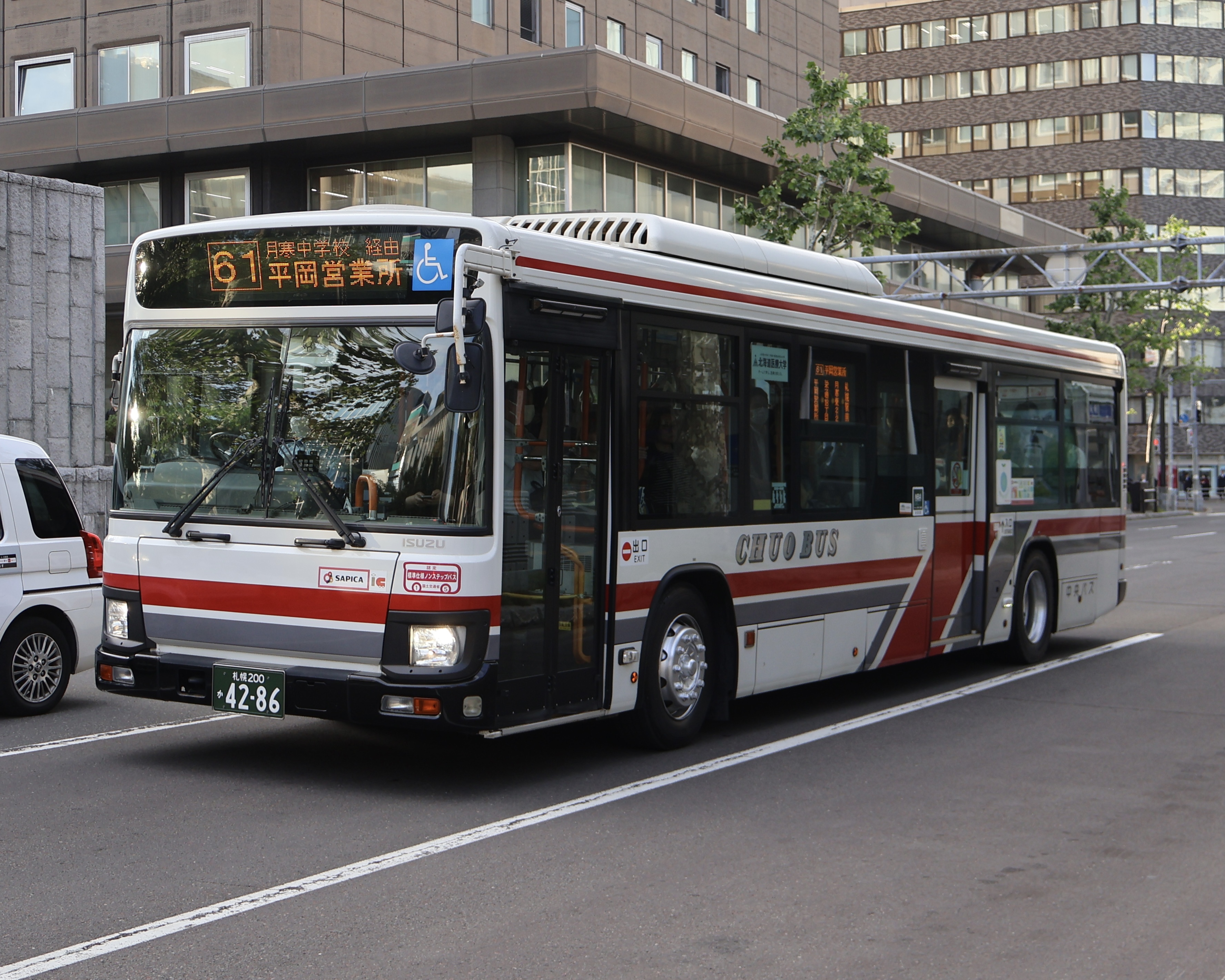
Hokkaido Chuo City Bus

- Otaru, Head Office
- Sapporo Office (maintenance department, Sapporo division & Charter travel division)
- Otaru division
- Takikawa, Sorachi division

=== Otaru division ===
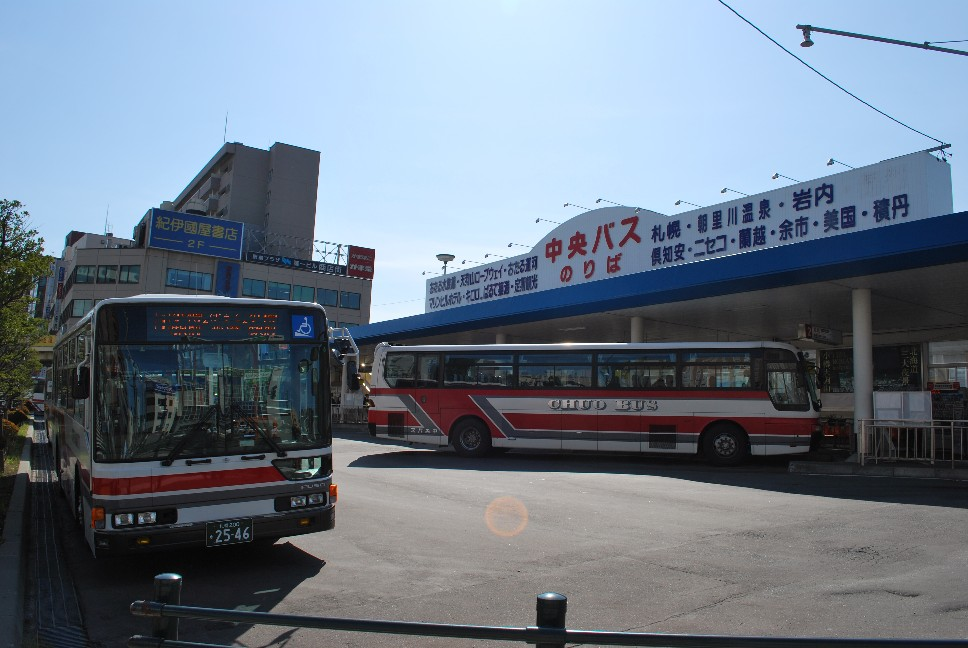
Hokkaido Chuo Bus Terminal next to Otaru Station

- Otaru, Shin Hokkaido Chuo Bus Terminal
- Yoichi Office
- Iwanai Bus Terminal
- Otaru Bus Terminal

=== Sapporo division ===
- Hiraoka Office
- Nishioka Sales Office
- Omagari Sales Office
- Shiroishi Office
- Sapporo-Higashi Office
- Sapporo Office
- Shinkawa Office
- Ishikari Office
- Chitose Office
- Ebetsu Sales Office
- Tsukisamu Office
- Asahikawa Bus Terminal, (Asahikawa Office)
- Sapporo Bus Terminal
- Sapporo Station Bus Terminal

=== Sorachi division ===
- Takikawa Sales Office
- Iwamizawa Office
- Takikawa Bus Terminal
- Iwamizawa Bus Terminal
- Rumoi Bus Terminal

== Highway bus routes ==
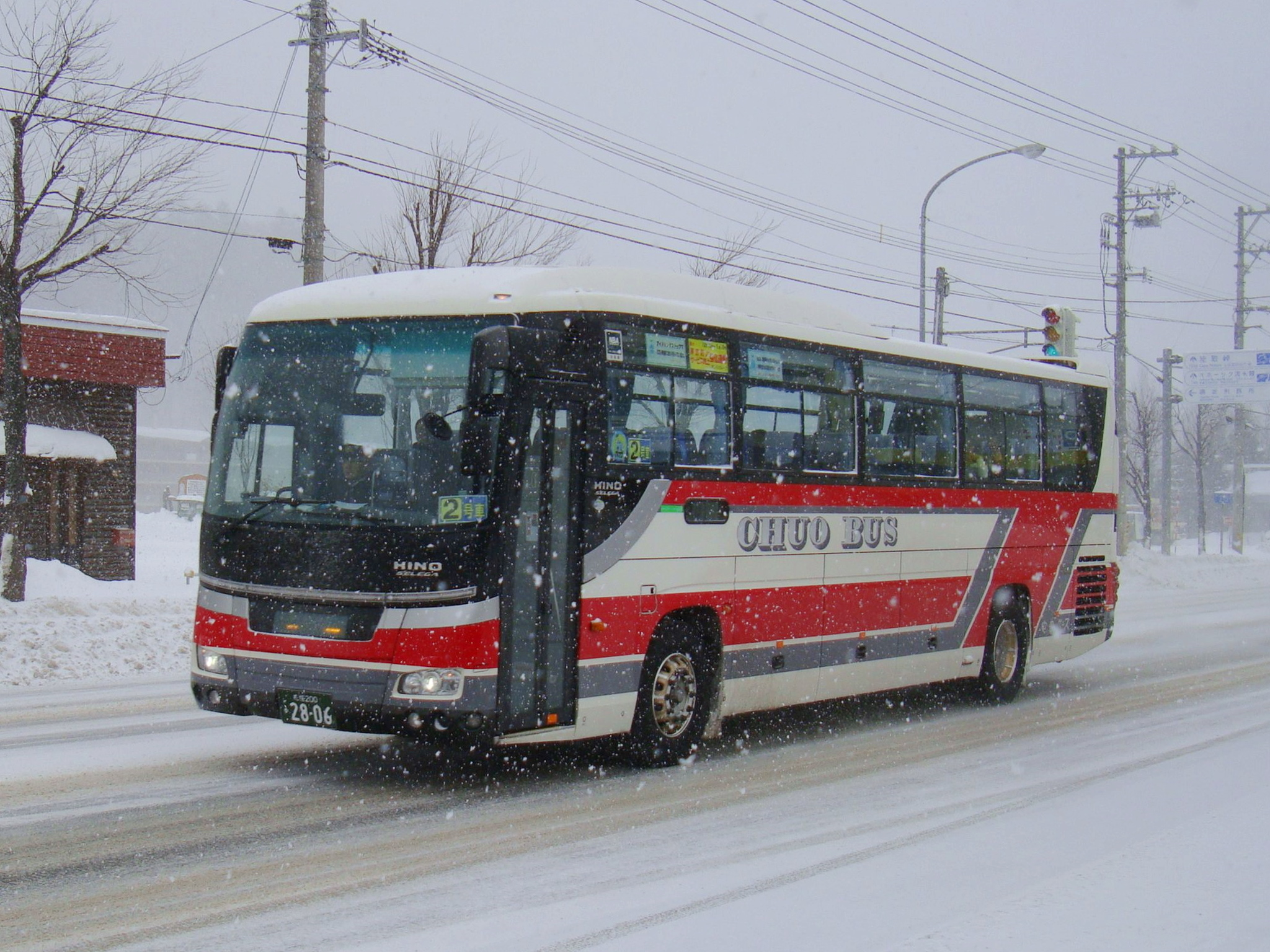
Hokkaido Chuo Bus Dreaming Okhotsk gō

- Sapporo - Kitami, Abashiri
- Sapporo - Otaru
- Sapporo - Iwanai
- Sapporo - Niseko
- Sapporo - Tomakomai
- Sapporo - Muroran
- Sapporo - Kutchan
- Sapporo - Obihiro
- Sapporo - Kushiro
- Sapporo - Nayoro
- Sapporo - Chitose Airport
- Sapporo - Kuriyama
- Sapporo - Yubari
- Sapporo - Asahikawa, Mombetsu
- Sapporo - Engaru
- Sapporo - Rumoi, Fukagawa
- Sapporo - Biei
- Sapporo - Iwamizawa, Mikasa
- Sapporo - Hakodate
