= Makkari =

Makkari may refer to:

- Ahmed Mohammed al-Maqqari, 17th-century Muslim historian
- Makkari, Hokkaidō, a village in Japan
- Makkari (character), comic book character

== See also ==
- Makari (disambiguation)
- Makar (disambiguation)
- Macari (disambiguation)
