= Boma ya Ulanga =

- Village
- Location in Tanzania
- Coordinates: 08°10′47″S 036°54′57″E
- Country: Tanzania
- Region: Morogoro Region
- District: Ulanga District
- UFI: -2561269

Boma ya Ulanga (Ulanga) is a village in Ulanga District, Morogoro Region of central Tanzania. It is on the west bank of the Ulanga River.
