= Makari, Tonkolili =

Makari
- village
- Location in Sierra Leone
- Coordinates: 08°46′15″N 011°50′10″W
- Country: Sierra Leone
- Province: Northern Province
- District: Tonkolili District
- Chiefdom: Kholifa Rowalla Chiefdom
- Time zone: UTC+0 (GMT)
- UFI: -1318480

Makari is a small village in Tonkolili District, Northern Province, of Sierra Leone, West Africa. It is located on a hill above the right (north) bank of the Pampana River.
