= Makari, Bombali =

Makari
- village
- Location in Sierra Leone
- Coordinates: 08°52′05″N 012°07′31″W
- Country: Sierra Leone
- Province: Northern Province
- District: Bombali District
- Chiefdom: Makari Gbanti Chiefdom
- Time zone: UTC+0 (GMT)
- UFI: -1318481

Makari is a village in Bombali District, Northern Province, of Sierra Leone, West Africa. It was the former headquarters of the Makari Gbanti Chiefdom.
