= Kotonofuji Muneyoshi =

Japanese sumo wrestler

Personal information
- Native name: 琴乃富士宗義
- Born: Muneyoshi Fujisawa; 7 November 1951 (age 74) Rusutsu, Hokkaidō, Japan
- Height: 1.83 m (6 ft 0 in)
- Weight: 140 kg (310 lb)

Sport
- Sport: Sumo
- Retired: January, 1982
- Heya: Sadogatake
- Record: 511-508-21
- Debut: May, 1967
- Highest rank: Maegashira 5 (November, 1975)
- Elder name: see bio
- Championships: 1 (Jūryō)
- Updated on June 2020

Kotonofuji Muneyoshi (born 7 November 1951 as Muneyoshi Fujisawa) is a former sumo wrestler from Rusutsu, Hokkaidō, Japan. He made his professional debut in May 1967 and reached the top division in July 1974. His highest rank was maegashira 5. Upon retirement from active competition he became an elder in the Japan Sumo Association under the name Oguruma. He left the Sumo Association in November 1985, as his elder name was needed by the retiring Kotokaze. He is now the proprietor of a chanko restaurant in the Kagurazaka neighborhood of Tokyo.

== Career record ==
Kotonofuji Muneyoshi
Year	January Hatsu basho, Tokyo	March Haru basho, Osaka	May Natsu basho, Tokyo	July Nagoya basho, Nagoya	September Aki basho, Tokyo	November Kyūshū basho, Fukuoka
1967	x	x	(Maezumo)	East Jonokuchi #21; 5–2	West Jonidan #84; 1–6	East Jonidan #113; 5–2
1968	East Jonidan #62; 4–3	West Jonidan #32; 2–5	West Jonidan #51; 6–1	East Jonidan #9; 0–2–5	East Jonidan #42; 5–2	East Sandanme #94; 5–2
1969	West Sandanme #56; 3–4	West Sandanme #60; 3–4	West Sandanme #65; 4–3	East Sandanme #50; 4–3	East Sandanme #35; 3–4	East Sandanme #43; 4–3
1970	East Sandanme #31; 5–2	West Sandanme #5; 5–2	West Makushita #48; 3–4	West Makushita #54; 3–4	West Sandanme #2; 5–2	East Makushita #40; 5–2
1971	West Makushita #23; 4–3	East Makushita #19; 3–4	East Makushita #28; 4–3	East Makushita #25; 5–2	East Makushita #14; 4–3	East Makushita #10; 3–4
1972	East Makushita #14; 1–6	East Makushita #38; 5–2	East Makushita #22; 5–2	West Makushita #10; 5–2	West Makushita #4; 5–2	East Jūryō #13; 8–7
1973	East Jūryō #10; 8–7	West Jūryō #8; 6–9	East Jūryō #12; 8–7	East Jūryō #10; 8–7	West Jūryō #8; 8–7	East Jūryō #7; 6–9
1974	West Jūryō #11; 9–6	East Jūryō #6; 8–7	East Jūryō #4; 9–6	East Maegashira #12; 5–10	East Jūryō #2; 7–8	West Jūryō #4; 10–5–P
1975	West Maegashira #12; 8–7	East Maegashira #11; 8–7	West Maegashira #8; 6–9	West Maegashira #11; 7–8	West Maegashira #11; 10–5	East Maegashira #5; 5–10
1976	West Maegashira #10; 8–7	East Maegashira #9; 2–13	West Jūryō #4; 4–11	East Jūryō #12; 10–5	East Jūryō #3; 9–6	East Maegashira #12; 4–11
1977	West Jūryō #4; 8–7	East Jūryō #3; 14–1; Champion	West Maegashira #9; 5–6–4	West Jūryō #1; 4–11	East Jūryō #8; 8–7	East Jūryō #5; 9–6
1978	West Jūryō #1; 7–8	West Jūryō #3; 8–7	West Jūryō #2; 8–7	East Jūryō #2; 8–7	East Jūryō #2; 8–7	West Jūryō #1; 7–8
1979	West Jūryō #3; 8–7	East Jūryō #1; 5–10	West Jūryō #6; 9–6	East Jūryō #1; 8–7	West Maegashira #13; 4–11	West Jūryō #6; 8–7
1980	East Jūryō #4; 6–9	East Jūryō #9; 9–6	East Jūryō #6; 6–9	West Jūryō #11; 7–8	West Jūryō #13; 10–5	East Jūryō #5; 5–10
1981	East Jūryō #10; 8–7	East Jūryō #6; 6–9	West Jūryō #9; 8–7	East Jūryō #7; 1–9–5	West Makushita #10; 2–5	West Makushita #27; 2–5
1982	West Makushita #50; Retired; 0–0–7	x	x	x	x	x
Record given as wins–losses–absences Top division champion Top division runner-up Retired Lower divisions Non-participation Sanshō key: F=Fighting spirit; O=Outstanding performance; T=Technique Also shown: ★=Kinboshi; P=Playoff(s); Divisions: Makuuchi — Jūryō — Makushita — Sandanme — Jonidan — Jonokuchi Makuuchi ranks: Yokozuna — Ōzeki — Sekiwake — Komusubi — Maegashira

== See also ==
- Glossary of sumo terms
- List of sumo tournament second division champions
