= Mount Fure =

Mountain in Hokkaido, Japan

- フレ岳

Highest point
- Elevation: 1,046 m (3,432 ft)
- Listing: List of mountains and hills of Japan by height
- Coordinates: 42°46′59″N 141°13′15″E

Geography
- Location: Hokkaidō, Japan
- Parent range: Nasu Volcanic Zone
- Topo map(s): Geographical Survey Institute 25000:1 漁岳; 50000:1 札幌

Geology
- Mountain type: Volcanic
- Volcanic arc: Northeastern Japan Arc

Mount Fure (フレ岳, Fure-dake) is a mountain in the Nasu Volcanic Zone. It is located in Chitose, Hokkaidō, Japan. The mountain is the source of the Shiribetsu River.
