= Macari =

Macari may refer to:

== Places ==
- Macari, Peru, capital of Macari District in Melgar Province, Peru
- Macari, a frazione of San Vito Lo Capo, a comune in Sicily, Italy
- Macari River, a river in Amapá state, Brazil

== People ==
- Anne Marie Macari (born 1939), American poet
- Chris Macari (born 1980), French music video director and producer
- Jani Macari Pallis, American engineer and executive
- Jojo Macari, English actor and musician
- Lewis Macari (born 2002), Scottish association football player
- Lou Macari (born 1949), Scottish association football player and manager
- Mike Macari (born 1973), Scottish association football player
- Paul Macari (born 1976), Scottish association football player

== See also ==
- Olenecamptus macari, a beetle species
- Makkari (disambiguation)
