= Makkari, Hokkaido =

Makkari 真狩村
- Village
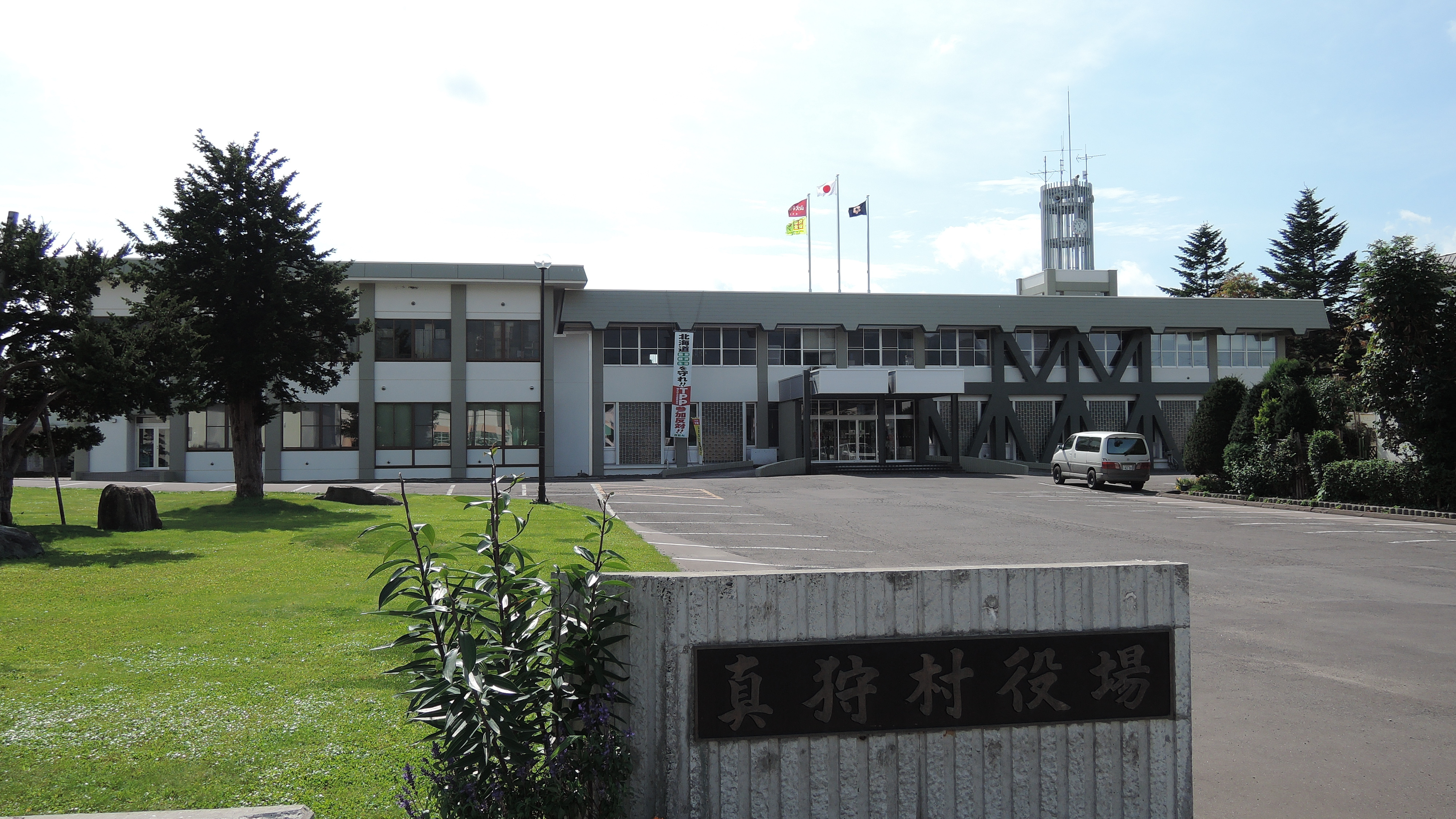
- Makkari Village hall

- Flag Emblem

- Location of Makkari in Hokkaido (Shiribeshi Subprefecture)

- Location in Japan
- Coordinates: 42°46′N 140°48′E
- Country: Japan
- Region: Hokkaido
- Prefecture: Hokkaido (Shiribeshi Subprefecture)
- District: Abuta

Government
  - Mayor: Kazumi Sasaki

Area
  - Total: 114.43 km^{2} (44.18 sq mi)

Population (September 30, 2016)
  - Total: 2,081
  - Density: 18.19/km^{2} (47.10/sq mi)
- Time zone: UTC+09:00 (JST)
- City hall address: 118 Makkari, Makkari, Abuta-gun, Hokkaido; 048-1631
- Climate: Dfb
- Symbols
- Tree: Katsura

Makkari (真狩村, Makkari-mura) is a village located in Shiribeshi Subprefecture, Hokkaido, Japan.

As of September 2016, the village has an estimated population of 2,081. The total area is 114.43 km^{2}.

== History ==
- 1897: Makkari Village split off from Abuta Village (now Toyako Town).
- 1901: Kaributo Village (now Niseko Town) was split off from Makkari Village.
- 1906: Makkari Village became a Second Class Village.
- 1910: Makkari Village was transferred from Muroran Subprefecture (now Iburi Subprefecture) to Shiribeshi Subprefecture.
- 1917: Kimobetsu Village (now town) was split off from Makkari Village.
- 1922: Makkaribetsu Village (now Makkari Village) was split off from Makkari Village.
- 1925: Makkari Village changed its name to Rusutsu Village.
- 1941: Makkaribetsu Village changed its name to Makkari Village.

== Geography ==
Makkari is located on the southern foot of Mount Yōtei. The name is derived from Ainu word "mak-kari-pet", meaning "River which flows around Mount Yōtei".

=== Neighboring municipalities ===
- Iburi Subprefecture
  - Toyako
  - Toyoura
- Shiribeshi Subprefecture
  - Kimobetsu
  - Kutchan
  - Kyogoku
  - Niseko
  - Rusutsu

=== Climate ===
Climate data for Makkari (1991−2020 normals, extremes 1978−present)
Month	Jan	Feb	Mar	Apr	May	Jun	Jul	Aug	Sep	Oct	Nov	Dec	Year
Record high °C (°F)	6.9 (44.4)	8.4 (47.1)	10.8 (51.4)	21.4 (70.5)	28.8 (83.8)	32.0 (89.6)	32.3 (90.1)	32.3 (90.1)	29.7 (85.5)	23.6 (74.5)	16.4 (61.5)	12.1 (53.8)	32.3 (90.1)
Mean daily maximum °C (°F)	−3.9 (25.0)	−3.0 (26.6)	0.9 (33.6)	7.2 (45.0)	15.0 (59.0)	19.2 (66.6)	22.5 (72.5)	23.4 (74.1)	19.8 (67.6)	13.0 (55.4)	5.1 (41.2)	−1.7 (28.9)	9.8 (49.6)
Daily mean °C (°F)	−6.6 (20.1)	−6.1 (21.0)	−2.5 (27.5)	3.2 (37.8)	9.8 (49.6)	14.1 (57.4)	18.0 (64.4)	19.0 (66.2)	15.1 (59.2)	8.6 (47.5)	1.7 (35.1)	−4.4 (24.1)	5.8 (42.5)
Mean daily minimum °C (°F)	−10.4 (13.3)	−10.1 (13.8)	−6.6 (20.1)	−0.9 (30.4)	4.8 (40.6)	9.6 (49.3)	14.3 (57.7)	15.1 (59.2)	10.5 (50.9)	4.1 (39.4)	−2.0 (28.4)	−7.9 (17.8)	1.7 (35.1)
Record low °C (°F)	−22.1 (−7.8)	−21.9 (−7.4)	−18.0 (−0.4)	−12.5 (9.5)	−3.7 (25.3)	0.3 (32.5)	5.9 (42.6)	4.8 (40.6)	0.1 (32.2)	−4.6 (23.7)	−12.1 (10.2)	−18.5 (−1.3)	−22.1 (−7.8)
Average precipitation mm (inches)	116.6 (4.59)	87.4 (3.44)	81.5 (3.21)	66.7 (2.63)	81.9 (3.22)	65.4 (2.57)	115.1 (4.53)	161.4 (6.35)	145.5 (5.73)	112.2 (4.42)	143.9 (5.67)	152.6 (6.01)	1,333.8 (52.51)
Average precipitation days (≥ 1.0 mm)	22.1	18.8	16.9	11.5	10.8	9.4	11.4	11.9	12.7	14.5	19.0	23.1	182.1
Mean monthly sunshine hours	33.1	45.3	89.6	149.5	178.1	157.3	130.8	127.3	141.9	121.5	59.6	25.8	1,259.8
Source: Japan Meteorological Agency

== Education ==
- High school
  - Hokkaido Makkari High School
- Junior high school
  - Makkari Junior High School
- Elementary school
  - Makkari Elementary School
  - Ohonai Elementary School

== Sister city ==
- (Kagawa Prefecture) Kanonji, Kagawa (since 1991)

== Notable people from Makkari ==
- Takashi Hosokawa, enka singer
