= Ulanga, Morogoro =

Ulanga
- Village
- Location in Tanzania
- Coordinates: 07°17′42″S 036°55′29″E
- Country: Tanzania
- Region: Morogoro Region
- District: Kilosa District
- UFI: -2574282

Ulanga is a village in Kilosa District, Morogoro Region of central Tanzania. It is just west of the Mikumi National Park.
