= Ulanga, Mbeya =

Ulanga
- Village
- Location in Tanzania
- Coordinates: 08°20′37″S 034°17′23″E
- Country: Tanzania
- Region: Mbeya Region
- District: Mbarali District
- UFI: -2574283

Ulanga is a village in Mbarali District, Mbeya Region of southwestern Tanzania. It is in the outwash plain of the Njamkala River.
