= Makari Gbanti Chiefdom =

Makari Gbanti
- Chiefdom
- Location in Sierra Leone
- Coordinates: 08°52′N 012°07′W
- Country: Sierra Leone
- Province: Northern Province
- District: Bombali District
- Capital: Masongbon

Population (2004)
  - Total: 41,186
- Time zone: UTC±00:00 (GMT)

Makari Gbanti is a chiefdom of Bombali District in the Northern Province of Sierra Leone. Officially, the principal town now lies at Masongbon. However, the village of Panlap is also considered the headquarters. The historical centre was Makari.

As of 2004, the chiefdom had a population of 41,186.

Sylvanus Koroma, father of President Ernest Bai Koroma, came from the village of Yoni in Makari Gbanti.
