= Niseko United =

Ski resort complex on Mount Annupuri, Hokkaidō, Japan

Coordinates: 42.869°N 140.665°E

- Interactive map of Niseko United
- Location: Shiribeshi Subprefecture, Hokkaidō, Japan
- Mountain: Mt. Niseko Annupuri
- Nearest city: Kutchan / Niseko
- Status: Active
- Top elevation: 1,308 m (4,291 ft)
- Trails: 73 total – 34% (25) novice – 37% (27) intermediate – 29% (21) advanced
- Lift system: 30 total (6 gondolas, 24 chairlifts)
- Night skiing: Yes
- Website: https://www.niseko.ne.jp/

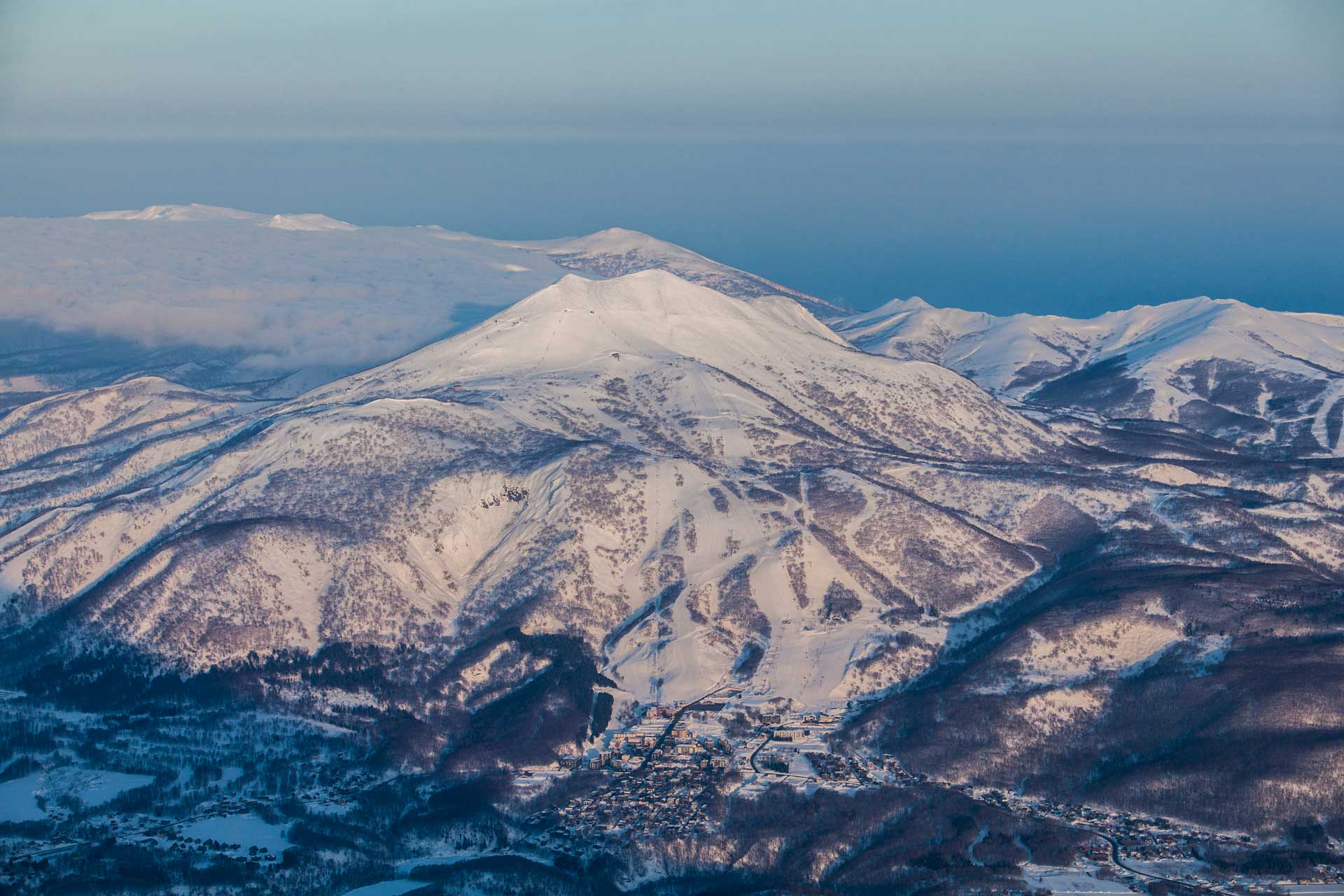
Niseko United Ski Resort in Hokkaido Japan

Niseko United is a ski resort complex on Mount Niseko Annupuri in Hokkaidō, Japan, comprising four interconnected ski areas:

- Grand Hirafu
- Hanazono
- Niseko Village
- Annupuri

Niseko United is renowned for heavy snowfall, powder conditions, and a unified lift pass allowing cross-resort skiing.

== Geography ==
Niseko United lies about 100 km southwest of Sapporo. The resort spans the municipalities of Kutchan and Niseko. The ski areas are connected near the summit of Mount Annupuri, enabling skiers to traverse between them under a single pass.

== History ==
=== Early beginnings ===
Skiing in Niseko traces to the early 20th century. In 1912, Austrian Lieutenant Colonel Theodor von Lerch visited Kutchan and is believed to be the first person to climb and ski down Mount Yōtei, helping introduce skiing to the region. In 1927, Japan’s participation in the Winter Olympics in St. Moritz attracted attention; local reports from that era began calling Niseko “the St. Moritz of the East.” In 1964, Kutchan established a sister-city relationship with St. Moritz.

=== Formation of the resorts ===
On 17 December 1961, Niseko Kogen Kanko Co., Ltd. opened the first lifts at what became Grand Hirafu. The next winter, the resort hosted the All-Japan Ski Championship. By 1965, lifts built by the St. Moritz Lift Company expanded access in Hirafu and Moiwa. The 1972 Sapporo Olympics spurred broader interest in skiing across Hokkaidō. That same year, Chuo Bus Co. Ltd. launched the Annupuri Ski Resort on the southern side of the mountain. In 1982, Niseko Higashiyama (later Niseko Village) was opened. Over the 1980s, high-speed quads and gondolas modernised access. The final resort, Hanazono, was opened in 1992 by Tokyu Land Corporation on the northern flank of Mount Annupuri.

=== Ownership changes and unification ===
In 2004, Tokyu Land Corporation acquired the Alpen Lifts from the St. Moritz Lift Company, consolidating its operations at Grand Hirafu. The same year, Hanazono was sold to Nihon Harmony Resorts KK. In 2007, Pacific Century Premium Developments (PCPD), a Hong Kong real estate firm, acquired Nihon Harmony Resorts and has continued operating Hanazono. By that period, Niseko comprised four resorts (Annupuri, Grand Hirafu, Niseko Village, Hanazono) each with separate management, but linked by terrain and unified pass systems.

=== Lift pass integration ===
Prior to the 1990s, each resort maintained its own lift ticket. In November 1993, the Niseko Free Passport (NFP) system launched—Hokkaidō’s first unified lift-ticket gate system, connecting Annupuri, Grand Hirafu, Higashiyama, and Hanazono under one pass. By 1998, the system extended to cover all lifts, evolving into the All-Mountain Pass, enabling seamless movement across all four resorts.

== Recent upgrades and expansion plans ==
Hanazono introduced a Symphony Gondola to unlock terrain on its northern side, including a gentler cruiser run called Colly’s Folly. For the 2021–22 season, Hanazono also added a new gondola and lift to improve connectivity and access.

Expansion into Niseko Weiss is included in the Hanazono master plan. The 2017 master plan envisioned a four-season, gondola-connected resort between Hanazono and Weiss, integrating base-area lands and a boutique village in Weiss. According to media reports, Hanazono’s expansion to Weiss may add three lifts and a connecting gondola, forming the largest ski domain within Niseko’s resorts.

== Accommodation ==
Around the resort of Niseko United there are a range of lodging options around its four base areas, including hotels, serviced apartments, condominiums, and chalets.

- Hirafu – the most developed base, with many ski-in/ski-out properties, condo hotels, and rental apartments.
- Hanazono – modern resort properties and vacation rentals near its new lifts.
- Niseko Village / Higashiyama – quieter inns and mid-range hotels.
- Annupuri – smaller hotels and lodges closer to the slopes.

The greater Niseko area also supports chalet towns and satellite accommodations served by shuttle systems.

== See also ==
- Niseko, Hokkaidō
- List of ski areas and resorts in Japan
