= Macarius II =

Macarius II or Makarios II may refer to:

- Pope Macarius II of Alexandria (d. 1128), Coptic leader
- Macarius II of Antioch (r. 1164–1166), Greek Orthodox patriarch of Antioch
- Makarios II of Cyprus (d. 1950), archbishop
- Macarius (Nevsky) (r. 1912–1917), metropolitan of Moscow
