= Niseko, Hokkaido =

Niseko ニセコ町
- Town
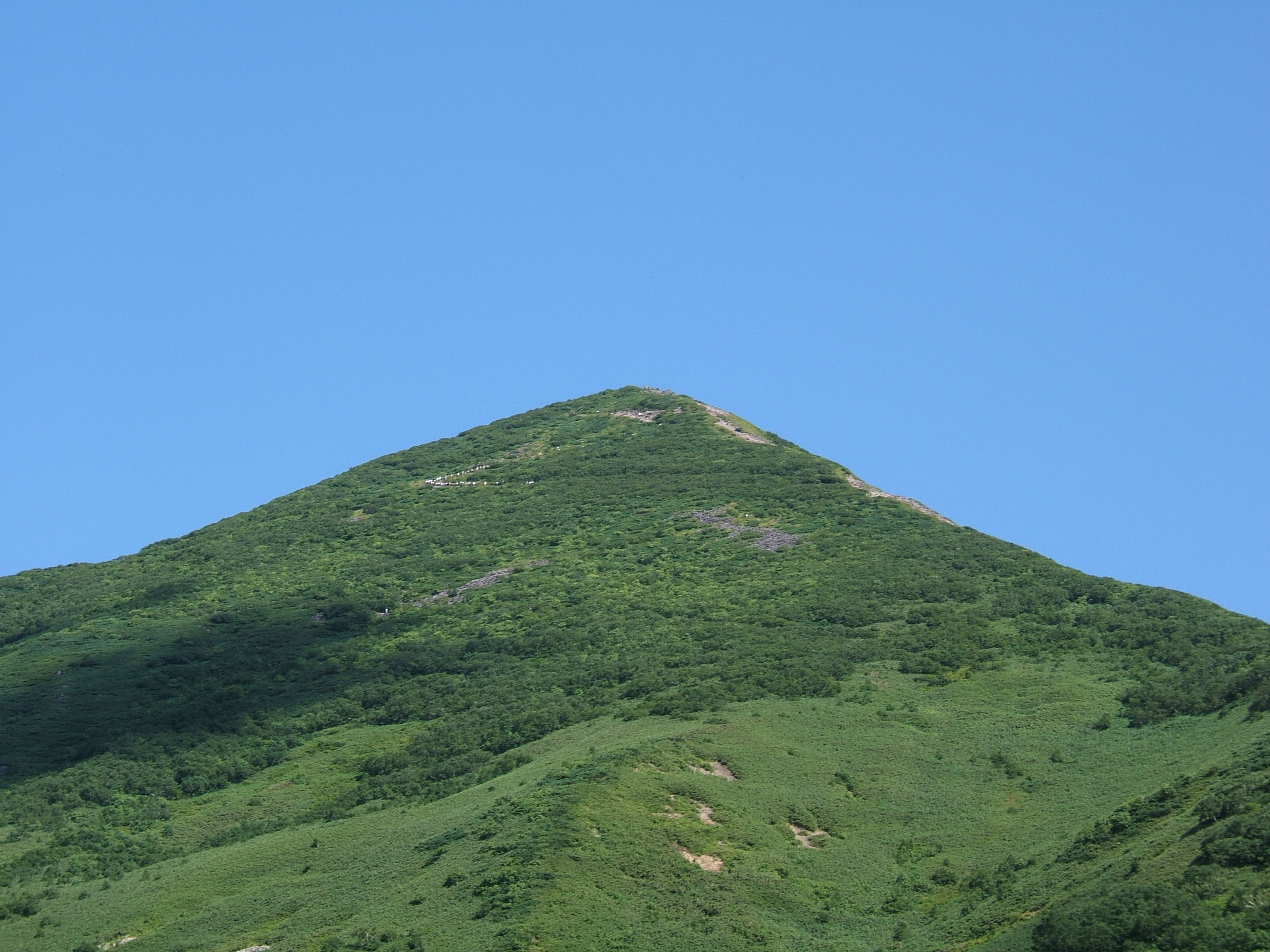
- Summer in Niseko Annupuri, one of the most famous mountains for downhill skiing in Hokkaido.

- Flag Seal

- Location of Niseko in Hokkaido (Shiribeshi Subprefecture)

- Location in Japan
- Coordinates: 42°48′N 140°41′E
- Country: Japan
- Region: Hokkaido
- Prefecture: Hokkaido (Shiribeshi Subprefecture)
- District: Abuta

Government
  - Mayor: Kenya Katayama

Area
  - Total: 197.13 km^{2} (76.11 sq mi)

Population (30 September 2016)
  - Total: 4,938
  - Density: 25.05/km^{2} (64.88/sq mi)
- Time zone: UTC+09:00 (JST)
- City hall address: 47, Aza Fujimi, Niseko-chō, Abuta-gun, Hokkaidō; 048-1595
- Website: www.town.niseko.lg.jp
- Symbols
- Bird: Great spotted woodpecker
- Flower: Lavender
- Mascot: Nicky (ニッキー) and Anicky (アニッキー)
- Tree: Japanese white birch

Niseko (Japanese: ニセコ町, Niseko-chō, [ɲ̟iseko tɕoː]) is a town located in Shiribeshi Subprefecture, Hokkaido, Japan. Niseko as a resort area refers to the Niseko tourism zone (ニセコ観光圏), which consists of the three towns of Kutchan, Niseko, and Rankoshi at the foot of Niseko Annupuri.

The name Niseko is derived from the Nisekoanbetsu River (ニセコアンベツ川), meaning "river toward the cliff" in the Ainu language.

The Niseko town's main income sources are agriculture and tourism. The resort itself, Niseko United, is part of the Mountain Collective. Moreover, the town is renowned for its quality powder snow and world-class facilities, including traditional onsen and restaurants.

== Town ==
The location of Niseko station

The town had an estimated population of 4,938 as of 30 September 2017, and a density of 25/km^{2} (65 inhabitants per square mile). The total number of visitors during the 2009 winter season was 201,000. The total area is 197.13 km^{2} (76.11 square miles).

== History ==
Since the present urban area of Niseko Town is located at the confluence of the Makkari and Shiribetsu Rivers, it was called "Makkari pet putu" (lit. 'mouth of the Makkari River') in Ainu, and came to be called "Makkari Bepputo" (真狩別太) in Japanese.

Archaeological evidence suggests that while the Niseko area carries Ainu-derived place names, there is no clear record of a continuous Ainu settlement in the present town area. However, Ainu people are known to have visited the region seasonally, particularly for salmon fishing along the Shiribetsu River basin.

Later, when the lower reaches of the Makkari River were divided from Makkari Village in 1901, the new village was named Kaributo Village (狩太村), short for Makkari Bepputo.

In 1950, Kaributo Village was promoted to Kaributo Town (狩太町). In 1963, the Niseko Annupuri area was designated as "Niseko-Shakotan-Otaru Kaigan Quasi-National Park," and the following year, 1964, the name of Kaributo Town was changed to Niseko Town to promote tourism.

The name Niseko originally comes from the Nisekoanbetsu River. Nisekoanbetsu is derived from the Ainu word "Nisei ko an pet," which translates directly to "river toward the cliff". The mountain that is the source of the river was called "Nisei ko an nupuri" (lit. 'the mountain of the Niseko [Anbetsu] River') in Ainu, or Niseko Annupuri in Japanese, with "nupuri" meaning mountain.

As a result, Niseko has come to refer to the area at the foot of Niseko Annupuri. For this reason, the town's name change was vehemently opposed by neighboring towns, which claimed that the name "Niseko" would be stolen.

Because of this, a distinction is made in Japan between Niseko Town and the Niseko area as a resort. Currently, the Niseko resort area includes the three towns of Kutchan, Niseko, and Rankoshi Town, which are designated as the "Niseko Tourism Zone" under Japan's Tourism Zone Development Law (enacted in 2008).

== Geography ==
Niseko Town is located at 140 degrees 48 minutes east longitude and 42 degrees 52 minutes north latitude. It is surrounded by the mountains of Mount Yōtei (1,898m), a national park, to the east and Niseko Annupuri (1,309m), a national park, to the north, forming a hilly basin with many wave-like slopes.

The Shiribetsu River (the clearest river in Japan in 2004) flows through the center of the town, and small and medium-sized rivers such as the Konbu River, Nisekoanbetsu River, and Makkari River flow into it.

== Climate ==
Niseko Town has a plateau-like environment with mountains on all four sides, which gives it a slightly continental climate, with relatively hot summers and cold winters.

Spring and autumn are generally mild, but the rainy season and early and late frosts often affect agriculture. Summer rainfall is also quite heavy. The most characteristic feature is winter, when the northwesterly monsoon brings moisture from the Sea of Japan, which is blocked by the Yotei-Niseko mountain range, resulting in snowfall. In summer, the winds are mostly from the southeast and southwest, and in winter, as mentioned above, the northwesterly winds are strong, but relatively mild compared to the rest of Hokkaido.

The average annual temperature is 6.7 °C, with August having the highest temperature at 20.5 °C and January having the lowest at -6.0 °C.

Annual precipitation is 1,498.5 mm, with relatively heavy precipitation from August to February and the heaviest precipitation from December to January. Compared to other regions in Hokkaido, the summer months have slightly higher temperatures and less precipitation, while the winter months have cooler temperatures and more precipitation.

The Niseko area is one of the heaviest snowfall areas in Hokkaido, with a total annual snowfall of 1,243 cm. Snowfall is particularly heavy from December to February, with more than 25 days of snowfall.

The resort is internationally renowned for its consistently good falls of light powder snow and its long ski season which runs from late November until early May. The snow is not as dry as other areas in Hokkaido, but the volume is high, with the average snow depth in March reaching 351 cm (138 inches).

Niseko was named as the world's No. 2 snowiest resort in December 2007 with annual average snowfall of 15.1 m (595 inches). First place went to the Mt. Baker Ski Area in Washington State with 16.3 m (641 inches).

Climate data for Niseko
| Month | Jan | Feb | Mar | Apr | May | Jun | Jul | Aug | Sep | Oct | Nov | Dec | Year |
|---|---|---|---|---|---|---|---|---|---|---|---|---|---|
| Mean daily maximum °C (°F) | −4 (25) | −3 (27) | 2 (36) | 8 (46) | 15 (59) | 19 (66) | 24 (75) | 24 (75) | 20 (68) | 13 (55) | 6 (43) | −1 (30) | 10 (50) |
| Mean daily minimum °C (°F) | −9 (16) | −9 (16) | −5 (23) | 0 (32) | 6 (43) | 11 (52) | 16 (61) | 17 (63) | 13 (55) | 6 (43) | 0 (32) | −6 (21) | 3 (38) |
| Average rainfall mm (inches) | 137.9 (5.43) | 102.7 (4.04) | 101.9 (4.01) | 81.2 (3.20) | 88.8 (3.50) | 108.1 (4.26) | 129.6 (5.10) | 184.0 (7.24) | 155.9 (6.14) | 148.1 (5.83) | 181.7 (7.15) | 177.6 (6.99) | 1,597.5 (62.89) |
| Average snowfall cm (inches) | 56.3 (22.2) | 36.7 (14.4) | 41.0 (16.1) | 6.2 (2.4) | 0.0 (0.0) | 0.0 (0.0) | 0.0 (0.0) | 0.0 (0.0) | 0.0 (0.0) | 1.5 (0.6) | 38.7 (15.2) | 64.6 (25.4) | 245 (96.3) |
Source: WWO

== Population ==
The total population of Niseko Town on 1 January 2023, was 5,088 (including foreigners), with 2,560 males and 2,528 females.

The population decreased from 1920 to 1940, but increased temporarily after World War II. However, the population began to decline again around 1960, when depopulation began to become more pronounced nationwide, and by 1980 it had dropped to less than half of its 1920 level. Since then, the population has remained flat, although there have been some fluctuations.

== Resort ==
The Niseko Tourism Zone, which includes Niseko Town, is located at the foot of Niseko Annupuri and is famous as an international ski resort area. The reason is that Japan's economy has been stagnant for more than 30 years, making it one of the cheapest ski resorts in the world.

== Transportation ==
Niseko is located in the southwestern part of Hokkaido. The nearest airport is New Chitose Airport. JR Hokkaido, taxis, limousines and rental vehicles are some of the options to get to Niseko. The journey from the airport takes around 2 hours and 30 minutes. Niseko has day trips to many of the surrounding areas.

The Hokkaidō Shinkansen (bullet train) linking Kutchan (倶知安) with Tokyo and Sapporo is scheduled to open in March 2031.

== Conferences ==
Niseko Town completely renovated and reopened its Community Hall as a conference center in January 2012.

== Education ==
Niseko Town operates a number of municipal schools under the jurisdiction of the Niseko Town Board of Education, including:

- Niseko Elementary School (Fujimi 12, Niseko Town)
- Kondo Elementary School (Kondo 266, Niseko Town)
- Niseko Junior High School (Fujimi 143, Niseko Town)
- Niseko High School (Fujimi 141–9, Niseko Town)

Niseko High School offers a unique curriculum integrating agriculture and tourism, and accepts students from both inside and outside the town. Boarding facilities are available for students from remote areas.

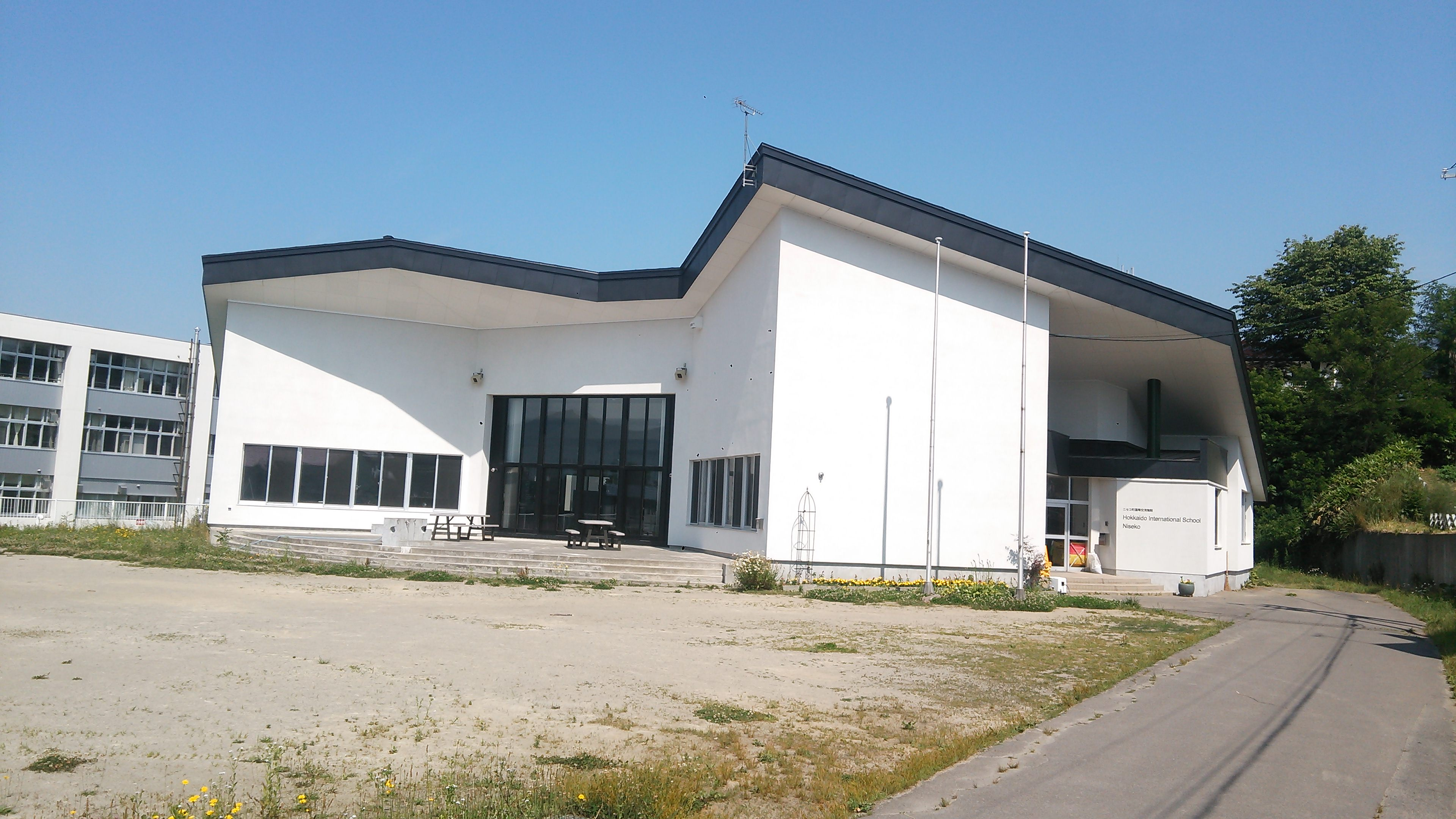
Hokkaido International School Niseko

Hokkaido International School (HIS) in Niseko is a private, coeducational day school that offers a western-style education from pre-school through 6th grade for students of all nationalities. English is the language of instruction. The school was established in 2011 and is a branch of Hokkaido International School in Sapporo. HIS Niseko and HIS Sapporo are the only international schools on the island of Hokkaido.

== See also ==
- Niseko
- Niseko-Shakotan-Otaru Kaigan Quasi-National Park
- Shikotsu-Tōya National Park
