= Abuta District, Hokkaido =

District in Japan

Coordinates: 42.775886°N 140.818165°E

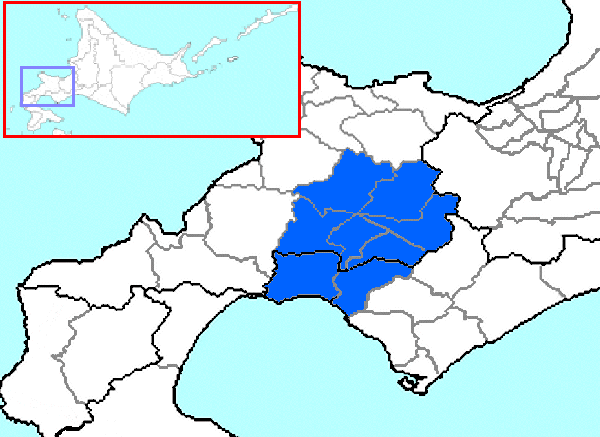
Abuta District in Iburi and Shiribeshi Subprefectures.

Abuta (虻田郡, Abuta-gun) is a district located in Iburi and Shiribeshi Subprefectures in Hokkaido, Japan.

As of 2004, the district has an estimated population of 31,526 and a density of 28.30 inhabitants per square kilometre (73.3/sq mi). The total area is 1,113.84 km^{2} (430.06 sq mi).

== Towns and villages ==
=== Iburi Subprefecture ===
- Tōyako
- Toyoura

=== Shiribeshi Subprefecture ===
- Kimobetsu
- Kutchan
- Kyōgoku
- Makkari
- Niseko
- Rusutsu

== History ==
- 1869: Upon the creation of 11 provinces and 86 Districts in Hokkaido, Abuta District is assigned to Iburi Province.
- 1897: Placed under Muroran Subprefecture (renamed Iburi in 1922).
- 1899: Kutchan transferred to Iwanai Subprefecture (became part of Shiribeshi in 1910).
- 1910: Shiribeshi Subprefecture forms from the merger of Iwanai, Suttsu and Otaru Subprefectures. Part of Abuta District incorporated.
- March 27, 2006: the towns of Abuta and Tōya, both of Iburi Subprefecture, merged to form the new town of Tōyako.
- 2007" The 34th G8 summit was announced to take place in Tōyako.
