= Rusutsu, Hokkaido =

Rusutsu 留寿都村
- Village
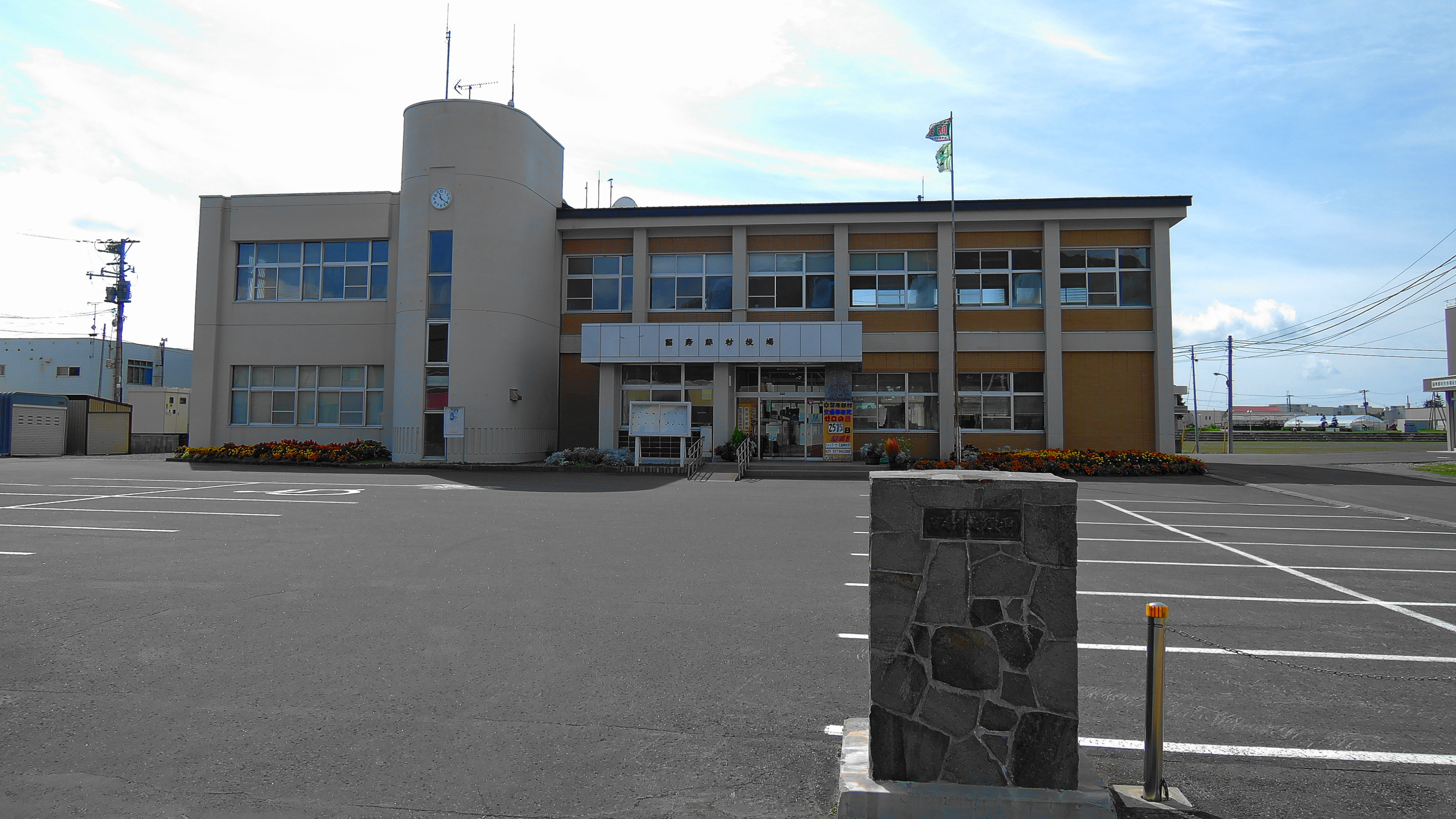
- Rusutsu Village hall

- Flag Seal

- Location of Rusutsu in Hokkaido (Shiribeshi Subprefecture)

- Location in Japan
- Coordinates: 42°44′N 140°53′E
- Country: Japan
- Region: Hokkaido
- Prefecture: Hokkaido (Shiribeshi Subprefecture)
- District: Abuta

Government
  - Mayor: Hisako Satō

Area
  - Total: 119.92 km^{2} (46.30 sq mi)

Population (September 30, 2016)
  - Total: 1,940
  - Density: 16.2/km^{2} (41.9/sq mi)
- Time zone: UTC+09:00 (JST)
- City hall address: 175 Rusutsu, Rusutsu, Abuta-gun, Hokkaido; 048-1731
- Website: www.vill.rusutsu.lg.jp
- Symbols
- Flower: Phlox subulata
- Tree: Betula pendula, Japanese elm

Rusutsu (留寿都村, Rusutsu-mura) is a village located in Shiribeshi Subprefecture, Hokkaido, Japan.

== Population ==
As of September 2016, the village has an estimated population of 1,940. The total area is 119.92 km^{2}.

== Geography ==
Rusutsu is located on the southern of Shiribeshi Subprefecture. Mount Shiritsu is in the northern of the town.

The name came from Ainu word "Ru-sutu" (ル スト゚), meaning "Road at the foot of the mountain".

=== Neighboring municipalities ===
- Iburi Subprefecture
  - Date
  - Toyako
- Shiribeshi Subprefecture
  - Kimobetsu
  - Makkari

== History ==
- 1897: Makkari Village split off from Abuta Village (now Toyako Town).
- 1901: Kaributo Village (now Niseko Town) was split off from Makkari Village.
- 1906: Makkari Village became a Second Class Village.
- 1910: Makkari Village was transferred from Muroran Subprefecture (now Iburi Subprefecture) to Shiribeshi Subprefecture.
- 1917: Kimobetsu Village (now town) was split off from Makkari Village.
- 1922: Makkaribetsu Village (now Makkari Village) was split off from Makkari Village.
- 1925: Makkari Village changed its name to Rusutsu Village.

== Sister city ==
- Yabu, Hyogo, Japan

== Industry ==
Rusutsu is the top producer of Daikon in Hokkaido. It also produces potato and Asparagus.

Commercial facilities and companies of Rusutsu are along Route 230. There are Sightseeing spots such as Rusutsu Resort at a distance from the center of the village.

== Education ==
- High school
  - Hokkaido Rusutsu High School
- Junior high school
  - Rusutsu Junior High School
- Elementary school
  - Rusutsu Elementary School

== Notable people from Rusutsu ==
- Kotonofuji Muneyoshi, former sumo wrestler
