= Shiribetsu River =

River in Hokkaidō, Japan

Shiribetsu River Shiribetsu-gawa
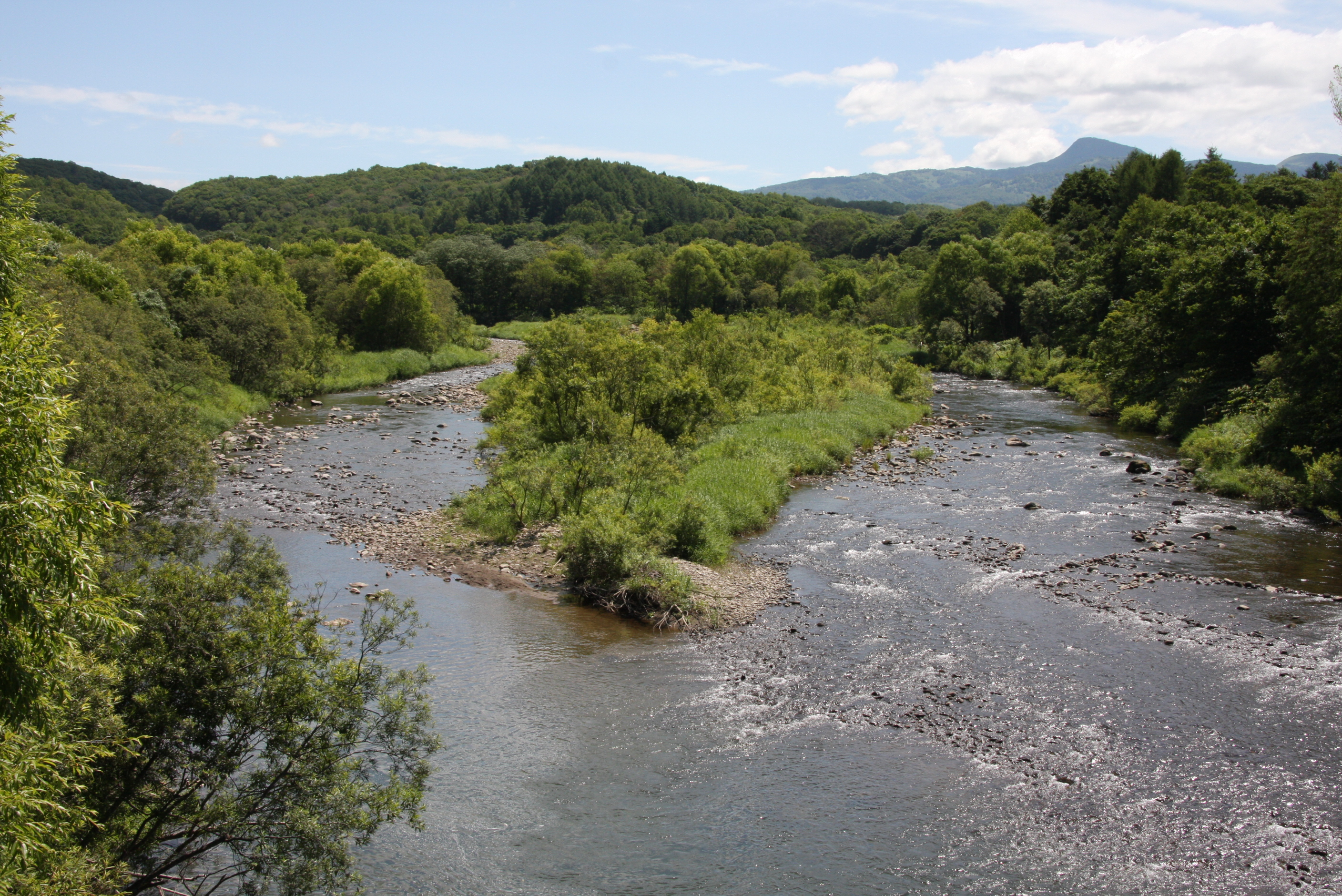

- Location within Japan
- Native name: 尻別川 (Japanese)

Location
- Country: Japan
- State: Hokkaidō
- Region: Shiribeshi, Ishikari
- District: Isoya, Chitose
- Municipality: Rankoshi

Physical characteristics
- Source: Mount Fure
  - location: Chitose, Hokkaidō, Japan
  - coordinates: 42°46′59″N 141°13′15″E
  - elevation: 1,046 m (3,432 ft)
- Mouth: Sea of Japan
  - location: Rankoshi, Hokkaidō, Japan
  - coordinates: 42°52′44″N 140°21′44″E
  - elevation: 0 m (0 ft)
- Length: 126 km (78 mi)
- Basin size: 1,640 km^{2} (630 sq mi)
- Discharge
  - average: 72.56 m^{3}/s (2,562 cu ft/s)

Basin features
- Population: 34,000

Shiribetsu River (尻別川, Shiribetsu-gawa) is a Class A river in Hokkaidō, Japan.
