= Mount Yōtei =

Active stratovolcano in Japan

- 羊蹄山 Yōtei-zan
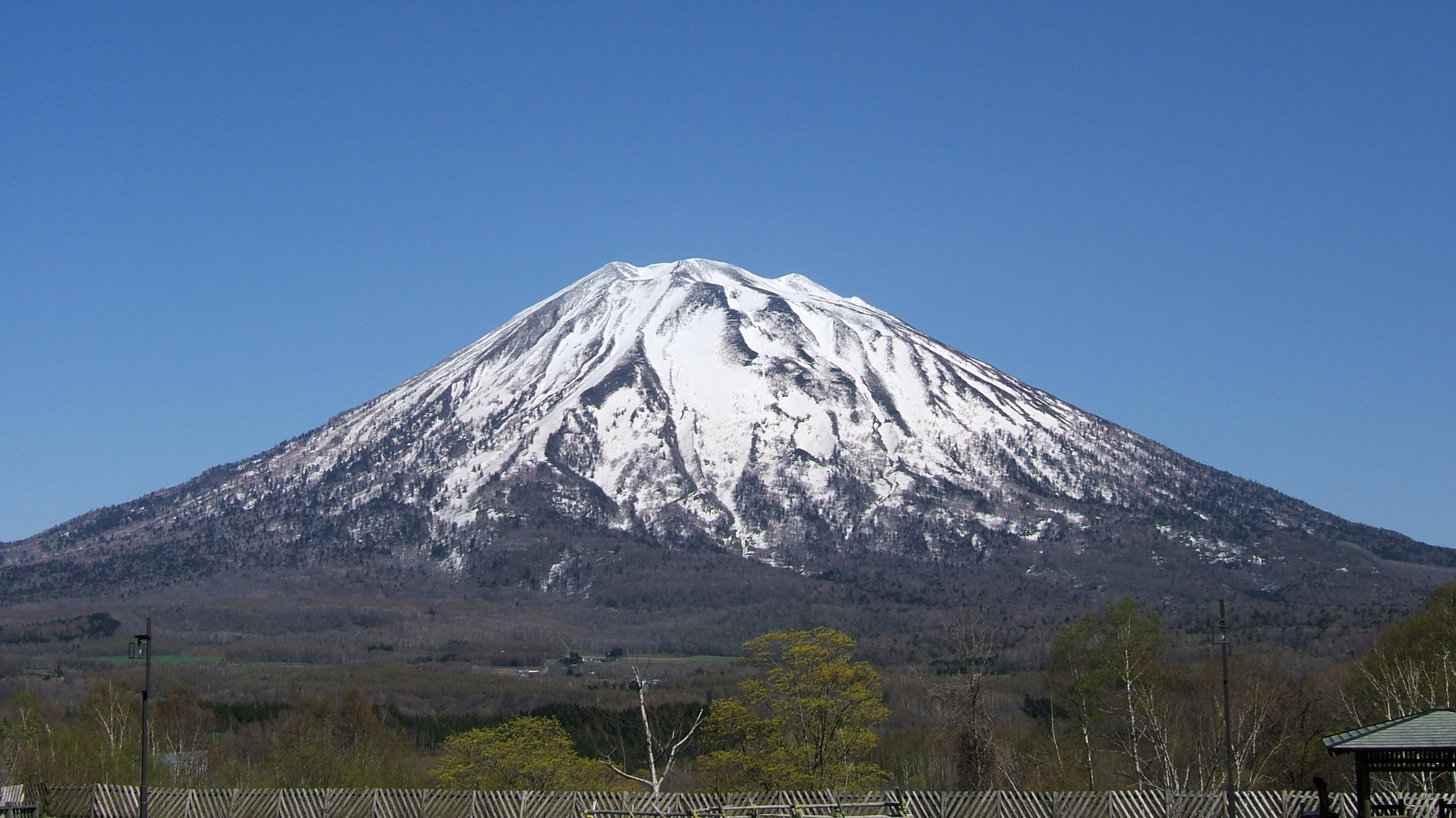
- Mount Yōtei from Hirafu on May 20, 2005

Highest point
- Elevation: 1,898 m (6,227 ft)
- Prominence: 1,878 m (6,161 ft)
- Listing: List of mountains and hills of Japan by height 100 Famous Japanese Mountains; List of volcanoes in Japan; Ultra
- Coordinates: 42°49′36″N 140°48′41″E

Naming
- Language of name: Japanese

Geography
- Location within Japan
- Location: Shiribeshi Subprefecture, Hokkaido, Japan
- Topo map(s): Geographical Survey Institute 25000:1 羊蹄山; 50000:1 留寿都

Geology
- Rock age: Quaternary
- Mountain type: Stratovolcano
- Volcanic arc: Northeastern Japan Arc
- Last eruption: 1050 BC

Mount Yōtei (羊蹄山, Yōtei-zan; literally "sheep-hoof mountain") is an active stratovolcano located in Shikotsu-Tōya National Park, Hokkaidō, Japan. It is also called Yezo Fuji or Ezo Fuji (蝦夷富士) because it resembles Mount Fuji; Ezo is an old name for the island of Hokkaido. The mountain is also known as Makkari Nupuri (マッカリヌプリ). It is one of the 100 Famous Japanese Mountains.

== Geology ==
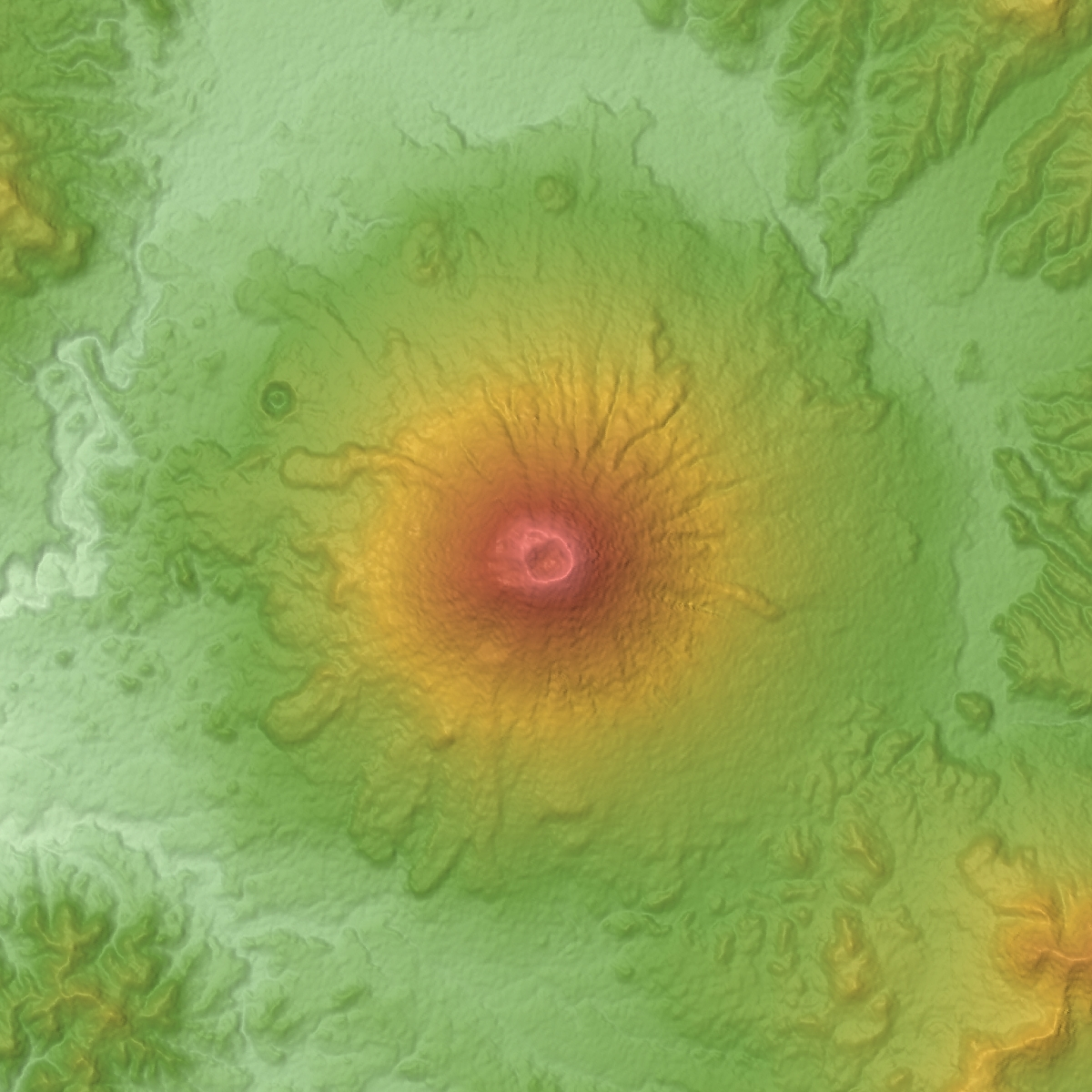
Relief map of Yotei volcano

Mount Yōtei is mostly composed of andesite and dacite. The stratovolcano is symmetrical, adding to its resemblance to Mount Fuji.

=== Eruptive history ===
Tephrochronology indicates two eruptions at Mount Yotei. The most recent circa 1050 BC from a cone emerging from the northwest flank of the mountain at Lake Hangetsu (Hangetsu-ko). The earlier eruption is dated from circa 3550 BC.

=== Climate ===
Mount Yōtei

Climate chart (precipitation, max. and min. temperature)
J	F	M	A	M	J	J	A	S	O	N	D
4.5 25 −10	5.2 27 −12	3.2 29 −5	1.4 32 6	1.3 39 17	1.3 48 29	3.2 54 34	11 56 37	14 44 26	9.6 36 19	6.6 30 4	6.2 27 −4
- █ Average max. and min. temperatures in °F
- █ Precipitation totals in inches
Metric conversion
J	F	M	A	M	J	J	A	S	O	N	D
113 −4 −23	132 −3 −24	82 −2 −21	37 0 −14	32 4 −9	32 9 −2	82 12 1	268 13 3	361 7 −3	245 2 −7	167 −1 −16	158 −3 −20
- █ Average max. and min. temperatures in °C
- █ Precipitation totals in mm

=== Avalanches ===
On March 11, 2024, two backcountry skiers from New Zealand died after they were caught along with four others in an avalanche along the volcano's slopes. A third person from the group was injured.

== Etymology ==
Mount Yōtei is also known as Ezo Fuji because of its almost perfectly conical shape resembling Mount Fuji, making it one of the "local Fujis" found in different regions of Japan.

Through Japan's Meiji, Taishō and Shōwa eras it was known by multiple names: "Shiribeshi-yama/Kōhō-Yōtei-zan" (後方羊蹄山), "Makkarinupuri" (マッカリヌプリ), and "Ezo Fuji" (蝦夷富士). On some maps it is also recorded as "Makkari-yama" (マッカリ山).

In the 50,000:1 scale topographical map of the "Rusutsu" area published in 1920 by Japan's Land Surveying Department, the mountain is recorded as "Shiribeshi-yama (Ezo-Fuji)". However, since the name was difficult to read, the town of Kutchan asked for it to be changed to Yōtei-zan. The change took place in the November 1969 topographical map published by the Geospatial Information Authority of Japan. Since then, the current name of Yōtei-zan has become established.

The mountain's former title of "Shiribeshi-yama" (後方羊蹄山) originates in the place-name of "Shiribeshi" (後方羊蹄), which was recorded in the Nihon Shoki as the place where Abe no Hirafu established a domain in the article of May 17 in the year 659 AD (Year 5 of the reign of Empress Kōgyoku). (The domain was established because the Ezo family groups of Ikashima and Uhona wished to receive the territory.) It is unclear whether this record refers to the same location as the current Mt Yōtei. The characters for "shiribeshi" (後方羊蹄) are consist of "shiribe" ("the rear", 後方), and "shi" ("sheep's hooves" or "Rumex japonicus", 羊蹄).

The Ainu called the mountain Makkarinupuri or Machineshiri (雌山) "female mountain", and referred to the Shiribetsu-dake mountain to the southeast as Pinneshiri (雄山) "male mountain". Shiribetsu-dake is also referred to by some fans as Zenpō-Yōteizan (written with the characters "Mt. Yōtei in front"), in contrast to Mt. Yōtei's old name of Kōhō-Yōtei-zan (which is written with the characters for "Mt. Yotei behind").

== Popular culture ==
Mount Yōtei is a region within the 2025 action-adventure video game Ghost of Yōtei, being the namesake for its title.

== See also ==
- List of volcanoes in Japan
