= Unique Feature Identifier =

Unique Feature Identifier or UFI is a geocode used for cities, towns, villages, and other geographic features. Generally, these are Static Unique Feature Identifiers (SUFI).
