= Makarovsky (rural locality) =

Makarovsky (Russian: Мака́ровский; masculine), Makarovskaya (Мака́ровская; feminine), or Makarovskoye (Мака́ровское; neuter) is the name of several rural localities in Russia.

== Republic of Dagestan ==
As of 2010, one rural locality in the Republic of Dagestan bears this name:

- Makarovskoye, Republic of Dagestan, a selo in Bolsheareshevsky Selsoviet of Kizlyarsky District

== Irkutsk Oblast ==
As of 2010, one rural locality in Irkutsk Oblast bears this name:

- Makarovskaya, Irkutsk Oblast, a farmstead in Bokhansky District

== Ivanovo Oblast ==
As of 2010, one rural locality in Ivanovo Oblast bears this name:

- Makarovskoye, Ivanovo Oblast, a selo in Lukhsky District

== Kaluga Oblast ==
As of 2010, one rural locality in Kaluga Oblast bears this name:

- Makarovsky, Kaluga Oblast, a settlement in Khvastovichsky District

== Kirov Oblast ==
As of 2010, one rural locality in Kirov Oblast bears this name:

- Makarovskaya, Kirov Oblast, a village in Pashinsky Rural Okrug of Afanasyevsky District

== Kostroma Oblast ==
As of 2010, one rural locality in Kostroma Oblast bears this name:

- Makarovskaya, Kostroma Oblast, a village in Petropavlovskoye Settlement of Pavinsky District

== Oryol Oblast ==
As of 2010, one rural locality in Oryol Oblast bears this name:

- Makarovsky, Oryol Oblast, a settlement in Abolmasovsky Selsoviet of Khotynetsky District

== Rostov Oblast ==
As of 2010, one rural locality in Rostov Oblast bears this name:

- Makarovsky, Rostov Oblast, a khutor in Verkhnyakovskoye Rural Settlement of Verkhnedonskoy District

== Tver Oblast ==
As of 2010, two rural localities in Tver Oblast bear this name:

- Makarovskoye, Sandovsky District, Tver Oblast, a village in Sandovsky District
- Makarovskoye, Sonkovsky District, Tver Oblast, a village in Sonkovsky District

== Volgograd Oblast ==
As of 2010, two rural localities in Volgograd Oblast bear this name:

- Makarovsky, Chernyshkovsky District, Volgograd Oblast, a khutor in Krasnoyarsky Selsoviet of Chernyshkovsky District
- Makarovsky, Uryupinsky District, Volgograd Oblast, a khutor in Rossoshinsky Selsoviet of Uryupinsky District

== Vologda Oblast ==
As of 2010, ten rural localities in Vologda Oblast bear this name:

- Makarovsky, Vologda Oblast, a settlement in Verkhnekemsky Selsoviet of Nikolsky District
- Makarovskaya, Babayevsky District, Vologda Oblast, a village in Borisovsky Selsoviet of Babayevsky District
- Makarovskaya, Kharovsky District, Vologda Oblast, a village in Slobodskoy Selsoviet of Kharovsky District
- Makarovskaya, Kirillovsky District, Vologda Oblast, a village in Aleshinsky Selsoviet of Kirillovsky District
- Makarovskaya, Dvinitsky Selsoviet, Syamzhensky District, Vologda Oblast, a village in Dvinitsky Selsoviet of Syamzhensky District
- Makarovskaya, Ustretsky Selsoviet, Syamzhensky District, Vologda Oblast, a village in Ustretsky Selsoviet of Syamzhensky District
- Makarovskaya, Lokhotsky Selsoviet, Tarnogsky District, Vologda Oblast, a village in Lokhotsky Selsoviet of Tarnogsky District
- Makarovskaya, Nizhnespassky Selsoviet, Tarnogsky District, Vologda Oblast, a village in Nizhnespassky Selsoviet of Tarnogsky District
- Makarovskaya, Verkhovsky Selsoviet, Tarnogsky District, Vologda Oblast, a village in Verkhovsky Selsoviet of Tarnogsky District
- Makarovskaya, Verkhovazhsky District, Vologda Oblast, a village in Shelotsky Selsoviet of Verkhovazhsky District

== Voronezh Oblast ==
As of 2010, one rural locality in Voronezh Oblast bears this name:

- Makarovsky, Voronezh Oblast, a settlement in Nizhnekamenskoye Rural Settlement of Talovsky District

== Yaroslavl Oblast ==
As of 2010, two rural localities in Yaroslavl Oblast bear this name:

- Makarovskaya, Myshkinsky District, Yaroslavl Oblast, a village in Florovsky Rural Okrug of Myshkinsky District
- Makarovskaya, Nekouzsky District, Yaroslavl Oblast, a village in Shestikhinsky Rural Okrug of Nekouzsky District
