= Makara (disambiguation) =

Makara is a legendary sea-creature in Hindu culture.

Makara may also refer to:

- Makara (album), the third studio album released by E. S. Posthumus
- Makara (magazine), a Canadian feminist arts journal, 1975–1978
- Makara (month), in Indian solar calendar
- Makara, a month in the Darian calendar
- Makara (short story), a Sri Lankan short story

== New Zealand geography ==
- Mākara, a rural locality on the coast of the North Island west of Wellington
- Makara River (Chatham Islands), in the Chatham Islands
- Mākara River (Wellington), part of the Ruamāhanga River system
- Makara Guardians, a group opposed to wind-farm development at Mākara

== Other uses ==
- Makara (surname)
- Oleg Makara (born 1954), Slovak film director and scriptwriter
- Gamzee Makara and Kurloz Makara, characters from the webcomic Homestuck (2009-2016)

== See also ==
- Macarius, a given name
- Makara River (disambiguation)
- Makar (disambiguation)
- Mağara (disambiguation)
