= Makar (disambiguation) =

Makar is a term from Scottish literature for a poet.

Makar may also refer to:

- Makar (National Poet for Scotland)
- Makar (given name), a Slavic male given name
- Makar (surname)

== Places ==
- Makar, Iran, a village in Mazandaran Province, Iran
- Makar, Nepal, a village in Nepal
- Makar Island in the Laptev Sea
- Makars' Court in central Edinburgh, Scotland
- Makar, Croatia, village in Croatia, near Makarska

== Ships ==
- Makar-class survey catamaran
- INS Makar (J31), the lead ship of Makar-class catamarans

== Other ==
- Macar, the name of several individuals in Greek mythology

== See also ==
- Machair, grassy plain found on northwest coastlines of Ireland and Scotland
- Macquart
- Makara (disambiguation)
- Makari (disambiguation)
- Makkari (disambiguation)
- Makarovsky (disambiguation)
