= Makarov =

Makarov or Makarow may refer to:

== Weapons ==
- 9×18mm Makarov, a pistol cartridge
- Makarov PM, a semi-automatic pistol

== People ==
- Makarov (surname), a Russian name (includes a list of people)
  - Admiral Makarov (disambiguation) (includes a list of people)
- Makarov (Hasidic dynasty), a Jewish religious group

== Places ==
- Makarov, Russia, a town in Sakhalin Oblast
- Makarov Basin, in the Arctic Ocean
- Makariv, a town in Ukraine, often known by the Russian form

== Media ==
- Vladimir Makarov (Call of Duty), a fictional character in the Modern Warfare series

== Other uses ==
- 5545 Makarov, an asteroid

== See also ==
- Makarovsky (disambiguation)
