= Makarovsky =

Makarovsky (masculine), Makarovskaya (feminine), or Makarovskoye (neuter) may refer to:

- Makarovsky District, a district of Sakhalin Oblast, Russia
  - Makarovsky Urban Okrug, the municipal formation into which it is incorporated
- Makarovsky (rural locality), rural localities in Russia called Makarovsky, Makarovskaya, or Makarovskoye

== See also ==
- Makar (disambiguation)
- Makarov (disambiguation)
