= Ohariu =

Ohariu may refer to:

- Ōhāriu, a current New Zealand electorate

- Ohariu (New Zealand electorate), the same electorate with its previous spelling (no macron)

- Ohariu, New Zealand, a suburb of Wellington, New Zealand

== See also ==
- Ohariu-Belmont (New Zealand electorate), a former New Zealand electorate
