= Makara River =

The Makara River refers to one of the following rivers in New Zealand.

- Makara River (Chatham Islands), in the Chatham Islands
- Mākara River (Wellington), part of the Ruamāhanga River system

== See also ==
- Makara (disambiguation)
