= Makara (surname) =

Makara is a surname that occurs in several cultures and languages. It is a Slavic surname, which is a variant of Makar, derived from the given names Makary or Makar, which are forms of the Greek name Makarios, meaning blessed.

Makara is also a Japanese family name. The name may refer to:

- Robert Makara (born 1948), Ukrainian skier
- Makara Naotaka (1536–1570), Japanese samurai
- Oleg Makara (born 1954), Slovak film director
- Gamzee and Kurloz Makara, fictional characters from the webcomic Homestuck (2009–2016)
