= Bardaghat Municipality =

Bardaghat बर्दघाट
- Municipality (नगरपालिका)
- Motto: "बर्दघाट नगरपालिकाको चाहना शान्ति, समृद्ध, सम्मुनत र सुन्दर समाजको स्थापना"
- Location in Nepal Bardaghat (Nepal)
- Coordinates: 27.55°N 83.80°E
- Country: Nepal
- Province: Lumbini
- Zone: Lumbini
- District: Parasi
- Established: 2014 May 18 (convert to municipality)

Government
  - Type: Mayor Council
  - Mayor: Shambhulal Shrestha
  - Deputy Mayor: Rudra Prakash Upadhyay

Population (2078)
  - Total: 76,703
  - Density: 473/km^{2} (1,230/sq mi)
- Time zone: UTC+5:45 (NST)
- Postal code: 33000 33007
- Website: bardaghatmun.gov.np

Bardaghat (or Bardghat) (Nepali: बर्दघाट) is a Municipality in Nawalparasi (West of Bardaghat Susta) District in Lumbini Province, Nepal. It is situated in the lap of the Chure range. This municipality was established on 18 May 2014 by merging existing Makar and Panchanagar Village Development Committees (VDCs). Again during the local election, the neighbouring VDC Dawanne devi and some parts of Dhurkot, Jamuniya, and Rupauliya were merged. It has a population of 76,703 (2078 Census) with an area of 162.05 km^{2}. The annual population growth rate is 2.77%. It has a literacy rate of 82.05%. It is an emerging town of Nawalparasi (West of Bardaghat Susta) District that is developing rapidly with tourist areas.

== Economy ==
It is a commercial and trading area, mostly an upcoming economy hub of Nawalparasi. The economy of Bardaghat is centered around trade, service, and business. The main trading points are Bardaghat Chowk, TCN Chowk, Chisapani, etc. Besides modern shopping, the traditional market called Hatbazar runs twice around the city area in two places: Wednesday in Chisapani, Friday in Hatbazar line, and Sunday in Dharma Basti, Tuesday in Paldana. The central aspect of business in Bardaghat involves banking, education, transport, and hotel. Dozens of banks, Financial institutes, and co-operative societies operate from here.

Bardaghat is connected to the biggest city Butwal and Bharatpur through the Mahendra highway. It serves as the gateway for the province no 5. The private commerce and trade of Bardaghat are united under the umbrella of Bardaghat Chamber of Commerce and Industry. "Audhyogik Byapar Mela" is an industry exhibition held in Bardaghat yearly at Mangsir/Poush.

== Transport ==
Bardaghat municipality is connected with the Mahendra Highway that connects Bardaghat to the Kakarbhitta and Bhimdatta in the east and west respectively. Another important highway of Bardaghat is the Hulaki highway that connects it to the Parasi and Bhairahawa. Bardaghat is also connected to Triveni through the Bardaghat-Triveni road also with the Maheshpur check post from the Bhutaha-Maheshpur road. Several buses operate from Bardaghat for the further destination. Daily a number of buses pass through Bardaghat which can easily be accessed from the TCN Chowk from which we can go to all parts of Nepal. Nearly more than 100 bus departs from the bus terminal of Bardaghat for a short distance such as Bardaghat-Butwal, Bardaghat-Triveni, Bardaghat-Malbari, Bardaghat-Parasi, Bardaghat-Maheshpur. During the winter season, small jeeps also operate towards the hillside of the city.

== Health ==
Health is a very important prospect required for humans. As such, Sahid Smriti Community Hospital and Chisapani Hospital are two major hospitals in this area. Private medical centers such as Sanjivani Health Home, Bardaghat Dental Clinic, Daunne Devi Hospital, etc., and other various Government health clinics are also present in Bardaghat.

== Education ==
Bardaghat is set to be an educational hub for the western Nawalparasi with more than 50 private and government colleges. Divya Jyoti Multiple Campus and Daunnedevi Multiple Campus are two notable colleges of the Parasi area, providing education from kindergarten to master level. Other various schools and colleges in this area are:

=== Schools ===
- Ex-army Public English Secondary School (EAPES School)
- New Life Secondary School
- Kumudini English Boarding Secondary School
- Salbas Sunrise English Secondary School
- Oasis Model Academy
- Mount Everest English Boarding School
- DEBHIS
- Glorious Academy
- Iris Academy
- Daunne Devi higher secondary school
- Divya Jyoti Higher Secondary School
- Global Academy
- Holy Care English Boarding School
- Manakamana English Boarding School
- Holy Angel English Boarding School
- Nawajiwan Higher Secondary School
- Shanti Nikunja Higher Secondary School
- Wisdom English Boarding School
- Raja Mahatma Purna Bhadra Secondary School
- Shree Adarsha H.S school
- Gyan Jyoti School
- Bardaghat Enlightened English School
- Shree Saraswati Secondary School, Kunjanpur
- Shree Nityanand Ratna Kumaru Secondary School, Jahada
- Gyankunj Shiksha Sadan
- Universal Cambridge English Boarding School
- SUMIN ADHIKARI ACADEMY
- Shree Akhanda Basic Level School

=== Colleges ===
- Divya Jyoti Multiple Campus
- Daunne Devi Multiple Campus
- New Life College

== Sports ==
Bardaghat is the hometown of a well-known football player Bimal Gharti Magar and cricket player Rohit Paudel. Sports such as football, cricket, martial arts, badminton, volleyball, basketball, etc. are being played in Bardaghat. Ex-Army Camp is one of the famous and multi-purpose grounds located here. In Bardaghat, a covered hall is under construction.

== Place of interest ==
- Daunne temple
- Triveni
- Buddhamangal Taal
- Ramgram
- Kanchankuti
- Sansarkot
- Kanchangadhi
- Baunna Ghola Simsar
- Shaid Smeerti Park

== Media ==
The two radio channels in operation are Radio Daunne and Dautari FM. One weekly daily named "Esthaniya Patra" and a local television channel "Triveni Television" are two popular media in this area.
