= Parasi =

Parasi may refer to:

- Parasi District, a district in Nepal
- Parasi, India, a census town in Sonbhadra district of Uttar Pradesh of India
- Parasi, Nepal, a place in Nepal
