= Monty Black =

New Zealand Anglican clergy

Monty Black is an Anglican priest.

He was educated at the University of Otago. He was Archdeacon of Ohariu from December 1996 until February 2013; and is currently Priory Dean of St John, New Zealand.
