= Shevtsov =

Shevtsov (Russian: Шевцов; feminine: Shevtsova) is a Russian-language surname derived either from the Russian word швец or from the Ukrainian term швець for "cobbler/shoemaker", literally meaning "child of tailor/cobbler". In Russian, the word shvets is also an obsolete term for for "tailor".

During the Soviet times, Russian names and surnames in international passports were transliterated using the French-language system, and these surnames were spelled as Chevtsov/Chevtsova.

The surname may refer to:

- Anastasia Shevtsova (born 1995), Russian professional ballerina dancer and actor
- Andrei Shevtsov (born 1961), Russian football player
- George Shevtsov (born 1950), Australian actor
- Illya Shevtsov (born 2000), Ukrainian football player
- Irina Shevtsova (born 1983), Russian mathematician
- Lilia Shevtsova (born 1949), Russian Kremlinology expert
- Lyubov Shevtsova (1924–1943), Soviet partisan
- Lyudmila Shevtsova (1934–2026), Russian middle-distance runner
- Makar Shevtsov (born 1980), Russian football player
- Natalya Shevtsova (born 1974), Russian sprinter
- Oleg Shevtsov (born 1971), Russian ice hockey player
- Tatiana Shevtsova (born 1969), Russian politician
- Yuri Shevtsov (born 1959), Belarusian handball player
