= Project West Wind =

Wind farm near Wellington, New Zealand

West Wind Wind Farm
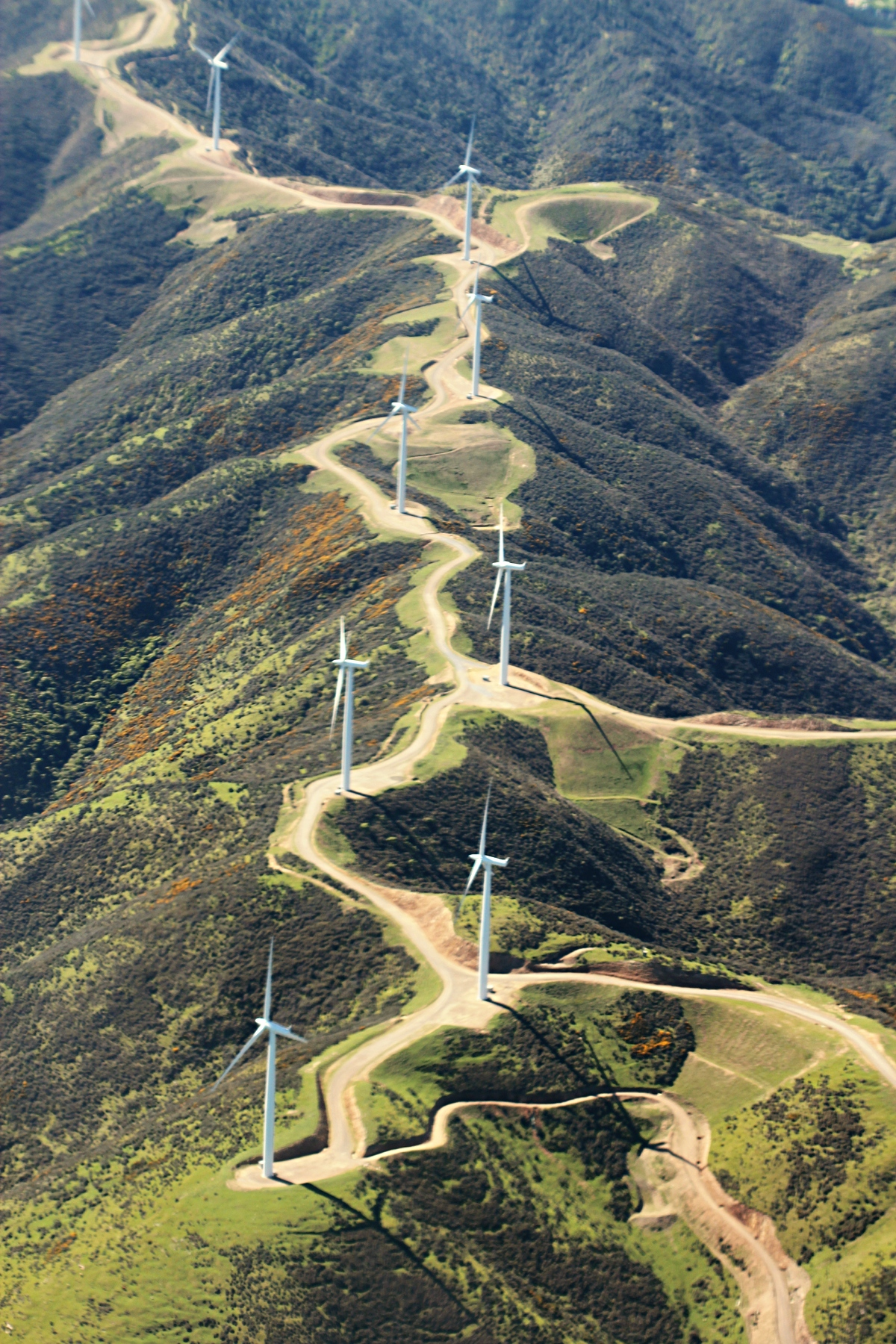
- Country: New Zealand
- Location: Mākara, west of Wellington City
- Coordinates: 41°16′35″S 174°39′37″E
- Status: Operational
- Construction began: September 2007
- Commission date: April 2009
- Construction cost: $440 million
- Owner: Meridian

Wind farm
- Type: Onshore
- Hub height: 68 m (223 ft)
- Rotor diameter: 82 m (269 ft)
- Rated wind speed: 13–14 m/s (47–50 km/h; 29–31 mph)

Power generation
- Units operational: 62
- Make and model: Siemens: SWT-2.3-82 VS
- Nameplate capacity: 142.6 MW
- Capacity factor: 44.0%
- Annual net output: 550 GWh

External links
- Commons: Related media on Commons

West Wind is a wind farm located at Terawhiti Station and Mākara, west of Wellington, New Zealand.

It is the first wind farm for the capital city, and has a capacity of 143 MW. Construction of the wind farm project began in September 2007 and was completed in late 2009. The wind farm received resource consent for up to 66 turbines, however only 62 were installed. It is owned and operated by Meridian Energy.

The wind farm was officially opened in April 2009, when Prime Minister John Key turned on the first 15 turbines. Electricity from the farm is stepped-up to 110 kV and is injected into Transpower's national grid via hard tee connections into two of the three Central Park to Wilton circuits (both circuits of the Central Park - Wilton B Line).

Six turbines suffered premature bearing failures in 2011.

The wind farm was the winner of the Energy and Resources category in the 2012 New Zealand Engineering Excellence Awards.

In September 2019 Meridian celebrated 10 years of generation with the Mākara and Wellington community at the recreation area.

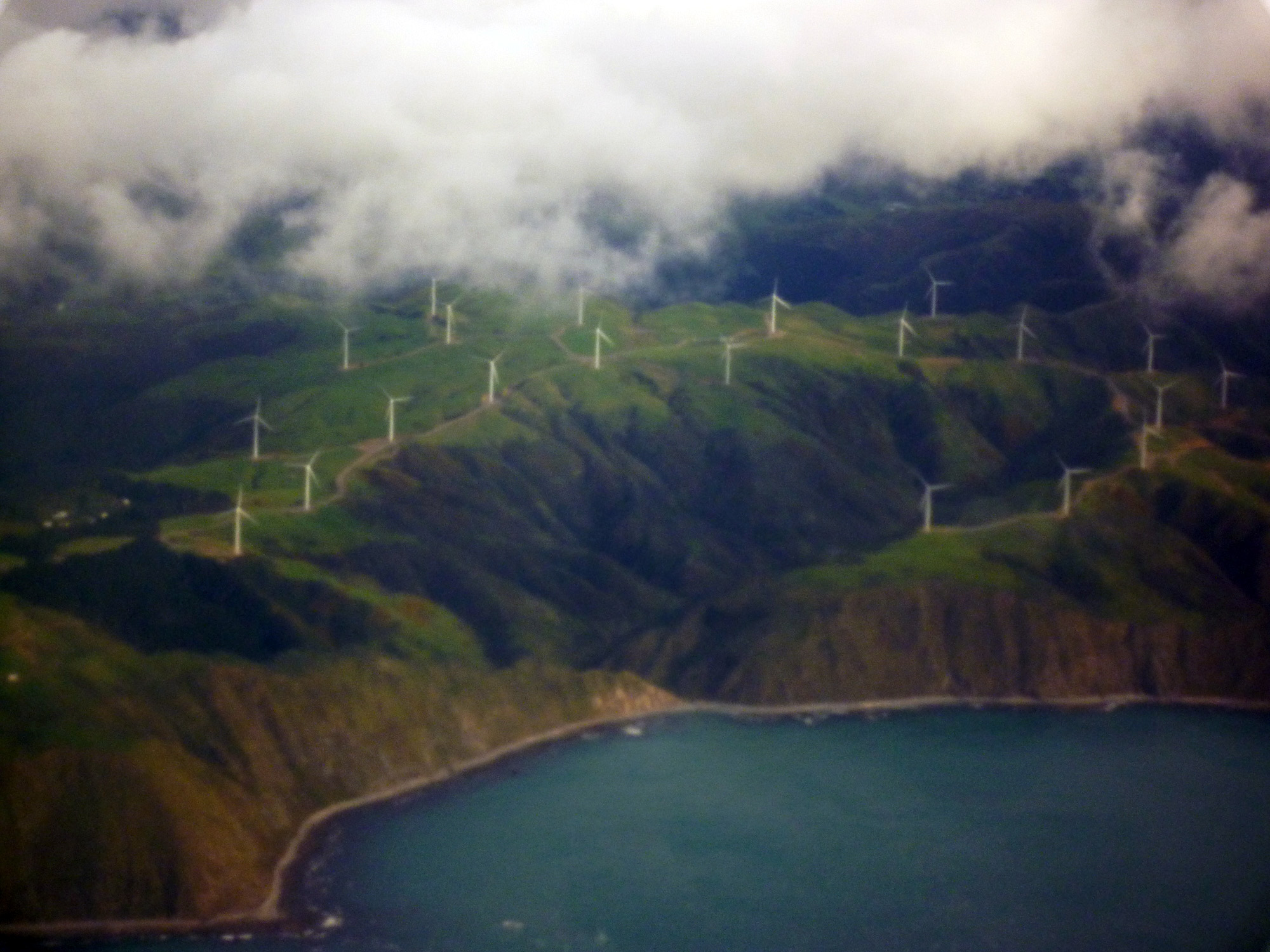
Project West Wind wind farm

== See also ==
- Wind power in New Zealand
- Makara Guardians
- Mill Creek Wind Farm
