= Makar (given name) =

Makar is a given name. In European cultures it is derived from the name Macarius/Makarios.

- Makar of Pécs
- Makar Dhwaja Darogha
- Makar Honcharenko
- Makar Ignatov
- Makar Kraŭcoŭ
- Makar Litskevich
- Makar Shevtsov
- Makar Teryokhin
- Makar Yekmalyan
- Makar Yurchenko

== Fictional characters ==
- Makar Chudra
