= Makara Guardians =

New Zealand incorporated society

The Makara Guardians Inc. is an incorporated society formed in 1997 to coordinate opposition to proposals to build wind turbines near where the members live. Mākara is a rural locality 10 km west of Wellington, New Zealand. The Makara Guardians represents some 85% of the families in the Mākara Valley, and consists of around 160 members . Membership is restricted to residents or owners of land in Mākara who support the objectives of the Society and who are aged over 18.

== History ==
The Mākara area has long been favoured as a site for building a wind farm. It is located in an area that enjoys reliably high average wind speeds for much of the year. It is close to a major metropolitan area – Wellington, and close to major transmission lines that supply the city with power. The terrain is hilly, with long ridges running 250 – 450 metres above sea level.

The Electricity Corporation of New Zealand (ECNZ) began investigating the area as a site for the development of a wind farm from 1995. It investigated a number of wind farm options ranging from an 8 to 10 turbine, 6 MW wind farm, through to approximately 50 turbines generating as much as 30 MW. ECNZ announced the 6 MW proposal in October 1997. The company also purchased a 1,000-acre (4.0 km^{2}) block of land in Mākara known as Quartz Hill in 1997.

The Makara Guardians opposed this 6 MW development. ECNZ never applied for resource consent, and subsequently shelved the wind farm plans. The company was split up in 1999, with Meridian Energy inheriting the Quartz Hill site.

In June 2005, Meridian applied for resource consent for a new wind farm, known as Project West Wind. It was substantially larger than the earlier ENCZ proposal, consisting of 70 turbines with a total capacity of up to 210 MW. This proposal joined the Quartz Hill site with the neighbouring Terawhiti Station – one of New Zealand's oldest and largest privately owned stations.

A key feature of this proposal, from the Guardian's perspective was the siting of some 22 of the 125 metre-high turbines along the top of a long a ridge that looms immediately above the South Mākara Valley, where many of the members live.

As soon as Meridian announced the proposal, the Makara Guardians mounted a substantial opposition campaign.

On 21 December 2005 the resource hearings commissioners announced their decision, granting the proposal to construct the wind farm at the Mākara site, subject to some construction conditions.

Both Meridian and the Makara Guardians subsequently appealed the consent decision to the Environment Court. The court granted resource consent in May 2007. Project West Wind was granted 66 turbines and will now produce approximately 140MW.
