= Stepan Makarov =

Russian admiral and scientist (1849–1904)

Stepan Osipovich Makarov
- Макаров Степан Осипович
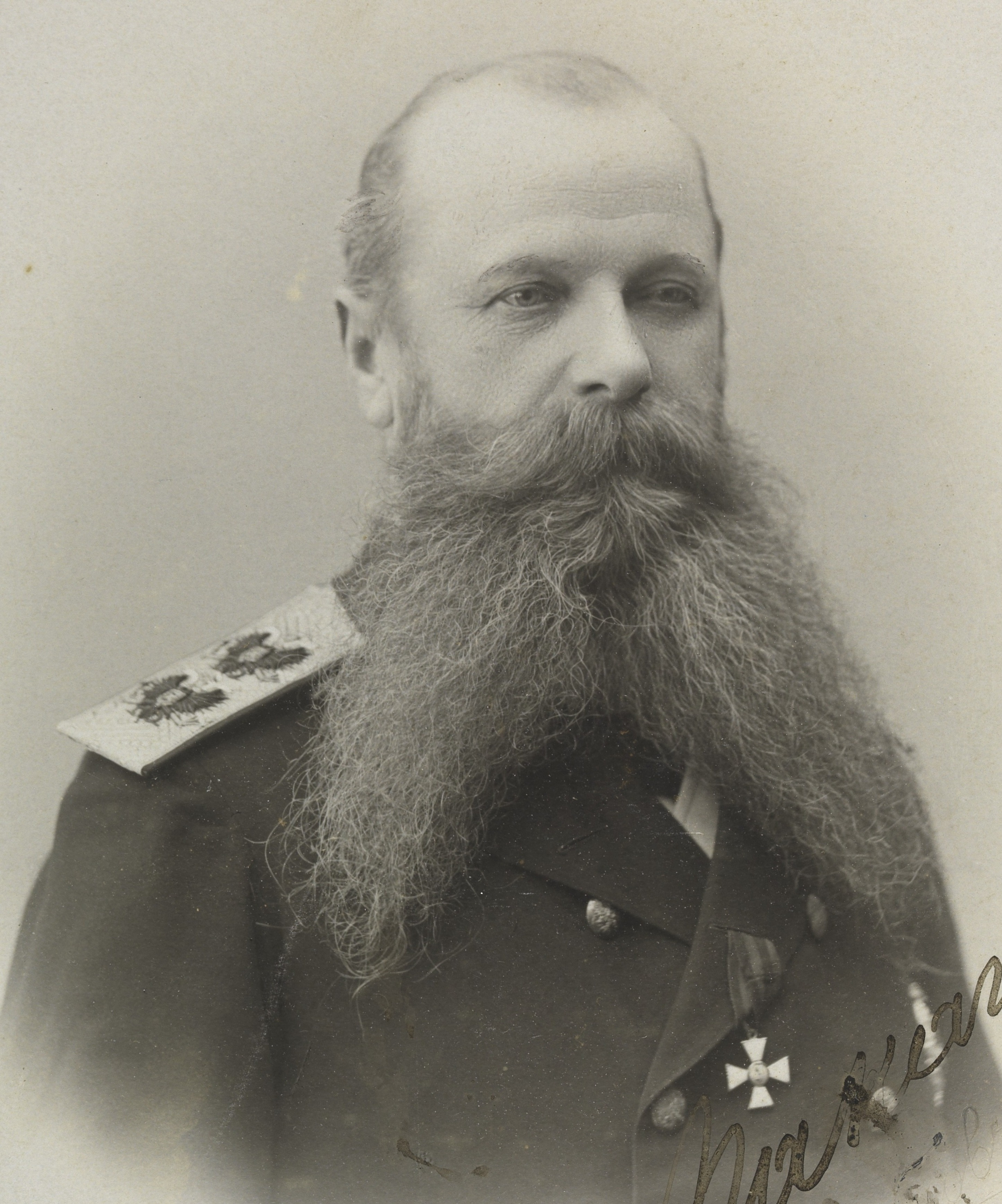
- Admiral Stepan Makarov, in the National Library of Norway
- Born: 8 January 1849 [O.S. 27 December 1848] Nikolaev, Kherson Governorate, Russian Empire (present-day Mykolaiv, Mykolaiv Oblast, Ukraine)
- Died: 13 April [O.S. 31 March] 1904 (aged 55) near Port Arthur, China
- Military career
- Allegiance: Russian Empire
- Branch: Imperial Russian Navy
- Service years: 1863–1904
- Rank: Vice Admiral
- Commands: Russian Pacific Fleet
- Conflicts: Russo-Turkish War; Russo-Japanese War †
- Awards: Order of St. George

Stepan Osipovich Makarov (Russian: Степан Осипович Макаров, Ukrainian: Степан Осипович Макаров; 8 January 1849 [O.S. 27 December 1848] – 13 April [O.S. 31 March] 1904) was a Russian vice-admiral, commander in the Imperial Russian Navy, oceanographer, member of the Russian Academy of Sciences, and author of several books. He was a pioneer of insubmersibility theory (the concept of counter-flooding to stabilise a damaged ship), and developer of a Cyrillic-based semaphore alphabet. A proponent of icebreaker use, he supervised the first polar icebreaker construction. Makarov also designed several ships.

Makarov saw service in the Russo-Turkish War (1877–1878) as a captain, and ordered the first successful attack with a self propelled torpedo. He served again in the Russo-Japanese War as vice-admiral and was assigned to the defense of Port Arthur, where he was hailed as a competent and aggressive commander. On 13 April 1904 Makarov led his flotilla to the aid of a destroyer that had been ambushed by the Japanese. Makarov was killed in the subsequent battle when his flagship Petropavlovsk struck a naval mine and the ship's magazine detonated. Japanese divers found Makarov's body after the war and gave him a burial at sea, and as a mark of good will Japanese officers led Makarov's funeral in Port Arthur. In 1946, after the Soviet invasion of South Sakhalin, the village of Shiritoru on that island was forcibly depopulated of its Japanese inhabitants and renamed Makarov in his honor.

== Early life ==
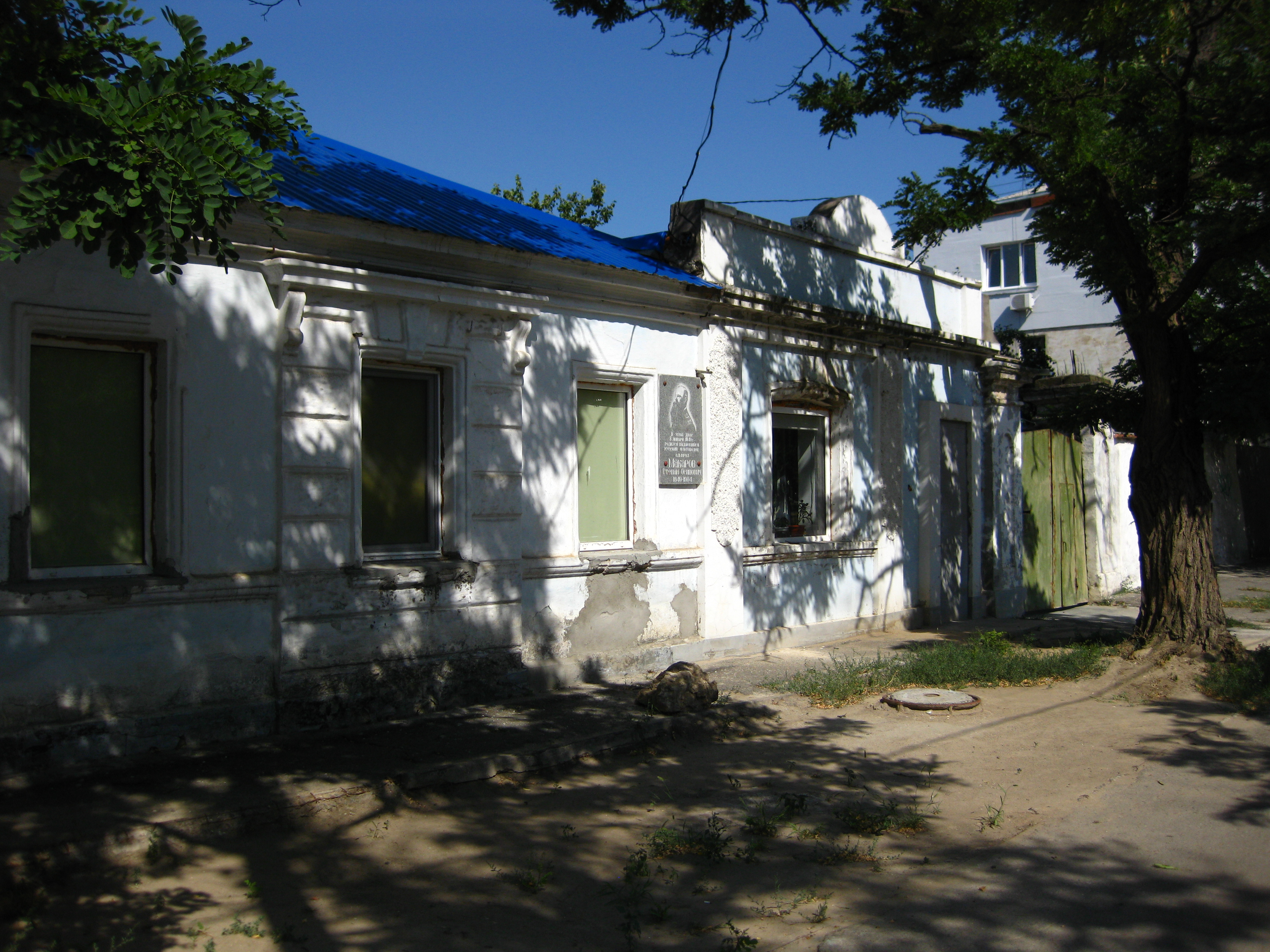
Makarov's birthplace in Mykolaiv

Stepan Makarov was born in Nikolaev (present-day Mykolayiv, Ukraine) into a family of fleet praporshchik (прапорщик по Адмиралтейству, an auxiliary officer). His family moved to Nikolayevsk na Amure on the Pacific coast of Russia in 1858, and Makarov attended school there. In 1863 he joined the Imperial Russian Navy, where he served as a cadet aboard a clipper of the Russian Pacific Fleet. In 1866 he took part in the voyage of the corvette Askold from Vladivostok to Kronstadt via the Cape of Good Hope. Between 1867 and 1876 Makarov served with the Baltic Fleet as flag captain under Admiral Andrei Popov. He transferred to the Black Sea Fleet in 1876.

In 1870 Makarov invented a design for a collision mat to seal holes in a ship's hull. The invention was displayed at the 1873 Vienna World's Fair, which Makarov attended.

== Russo-Turkish War ==
Makarov was highly decorated for his service as a captain of the Russian torpedo boat tender Velikiy Knyaz Konstantin in the Russo-Turkish War of 1877–78. He was one of the first to adopt the idea of using flotillas of torpedo boats and had combat experience as a torpedo boat commander. On 14 January 1878 he launched torpedoes from a boat (which itself was launched from a tender) sinking the Ottoman Navy vessel Intibakh at Batumi in the world's first successful attack using the self-propelled Whitehead torpedo.

From 1879 to 1880, Makarov was part of the maritime contingent during the Russian conquest of Central Asia. He was promoted to captain, 1st rank, on 1 January 1881.

== Naval innovator ==
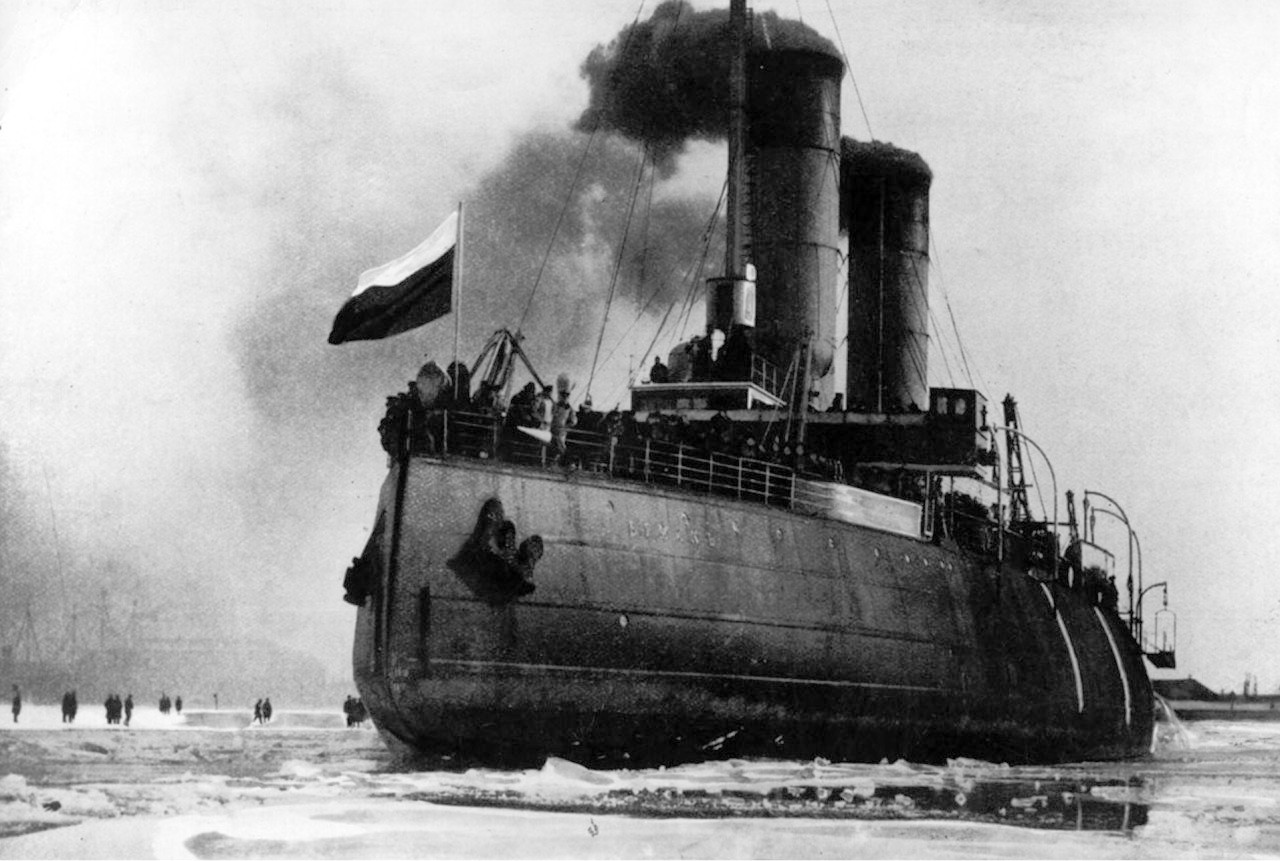
The icebreaker Yermak

Over the next two decades, Makarov specialized in naval research, publishing over fifty papers on oceanography and naval tactics. As captain of the corvette Vityaz, Makarov directed a round-the-world oceanographic expedition from 1886 to 1889. Makarov was promoted to rear admiral in 1890, the youngest person in the history of the Russian Navy to attain such a position. From 1890 to 1894, Makarov served as Chief Inspector of Naval Ordinance, during which time he invented the "Makarov cap", an armor-piercing projectile whose design was soon copied by all navies. From 1894 to 1895, Makarov was commander of the Mediterranean Squadron. From 1895 to 1896, Makarov was in charge of naval training. He became a vice admiral in 1896, and began to concentrate on a design for new warships, especially icebreakers needed to establish a northern sea route between Europe and East Asia. Makarov led an expedition to survey the mouths of the Ob and the Yenisei Rivers in 1897. As part of his research on icebreaking methods, Makarov visited the Great Lakes of North America in 1898 to study methods in use by railroad ferries in winter. He proposed the world's first polar icebreaker, Yermak, oversaw her construction, and commanded her on her maiden voyage in 1899. In 1899, Makarov was also appointed commander and military governor of Kronstadt in January 1900. In 1901, Makarov commanded Yermak on an Arctic expedition to survey the coasts of Novaya Zemlya and Franz Josef Land.

== Lake Baikal icebreakers ==
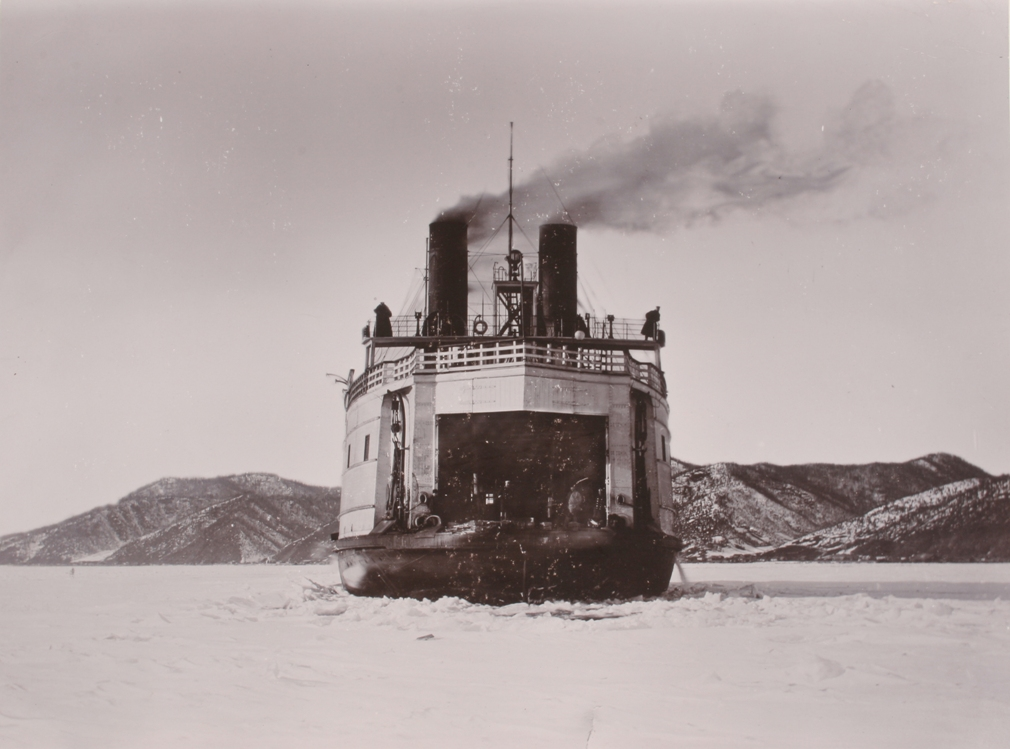
SS Baikal in service on Lake Baikal

Makarov also designed two icebreaking steamships to connect the Trans-Siberian Railway across Lake Baikal: the train ferry SS Baikal built in 1897 and passenger and package freight steamer SS Angara built in about 1900, based upon his study of similar vessels on the North American Great Lakes.

Armstrong Whitworth in Newcastle-upon-Tyne, England, built the ships in kit form and sent them to Listvyanka on Lake Baikal for reassembly. Their boilers, engines and some other components were built in Saint Petersburg. Baikal had 15 boilers, four funnels, was 64 metres (210 ft) long and could carry 24 railway coaches and one locomotive on her middle deck. Angara is smaller, with two funnels.

Baikal was burnt out and destroyed in the Russian Civil War. Angara survives, has been restored and is permanently moored at Irkutsk where she serves as offices and a museum.

== Russo-Japanese War ==
After the Imperial Japanese Navy's surprise attack at Port Arthur on 9 February 1904, Admiral Makarov was sent to command the Imperial Russian Navy's battle fleet stationed there on 24 February, establishing the battleship Petropavlovsk as his flagship. His leadership differed greatly from any other Russian naval officer during this war, offering diversity, aggression, and an ability to "inspire confidence in his subordinates".

Upon his assumption of command in early 1904, Makarov greatly increased the activity in the Russian squadrons, as well as the general defense of Port Arthur. Until then the Russian fleet had generally done nothing but exist, as a fleet in being. Under Makarov's leadership, "Russian squadrons put to sea nearly every day, constantly on the move, and ensuring that it was never taken by surprise outside the protection of Port Arthur's" shore batteries.

Unlike his predecessors, Makarov sought engagements with the Japanese, and kept his vessels in an order of battle in the roadstead of Port Arthur. When Japanese cruisers bombarded Port Arthur from the Yellow Sea in March, his cruisers returned fire with such intensity that the Japanese ships were forced to withdraw. That same month the Japanese Navy tried to seal the port's entrance by sinking a number of old steamships as blockships in the harbor's channel. Russian cruisers assigned to protect the entrance pursued the escorting Japanese warships and quickly put them to flight.

On 13 April 1904 the Russian destroyer Strasny returning from patrol, tried to re-enter the mouth of the Port Arthur but was intercepted by Japanese destroyers. An engagement began between the opposing destroyers, and when observed by Makarov he immediately sent the cruiser Bayan to assist Strasny, while he led three battleships, four cruisers, and a group of destroyers into the Yellow Sea to seek battle with the surrounding enemy warships led by Japanese Admiral Tōgō Heihachirō. While rushing out of the harbour, Makarov failed to check for mines, but ordered that the area be swept for mines before his return.

The Japanese warships withdrew with Makarov in pursuit. As Makarov caught up to the Japanese fleet, the thick fog that blanketed the sea lifted to reveal the Japanese trap: Admiral Togo was waiting with his capital ship and five additional battleships, plus six additional first-class cruisers bringing up the rear. Makarov quickly turned his force around and fled back to the safety of Port Arthur's harbour. As Petropavlovsk moved closer to the harbour's entrance, she detonated a Japanese mine that his men had failed to clear as he had instructed. Secondary explosions followed quickly in succession and Petropavlovsk sank, taking Admiral Makarov with her.

The admiral's remains and those of five of his officers were recovered from the wreck of Petropavlovsk by Japanese salvage teams, and in 1913, as a gesture of good will, the officers and crew of the Japanese cruiser Akitsushima presided over the funeral for the admiral in the military cemetery of Port Arthur.

== Monuments ==
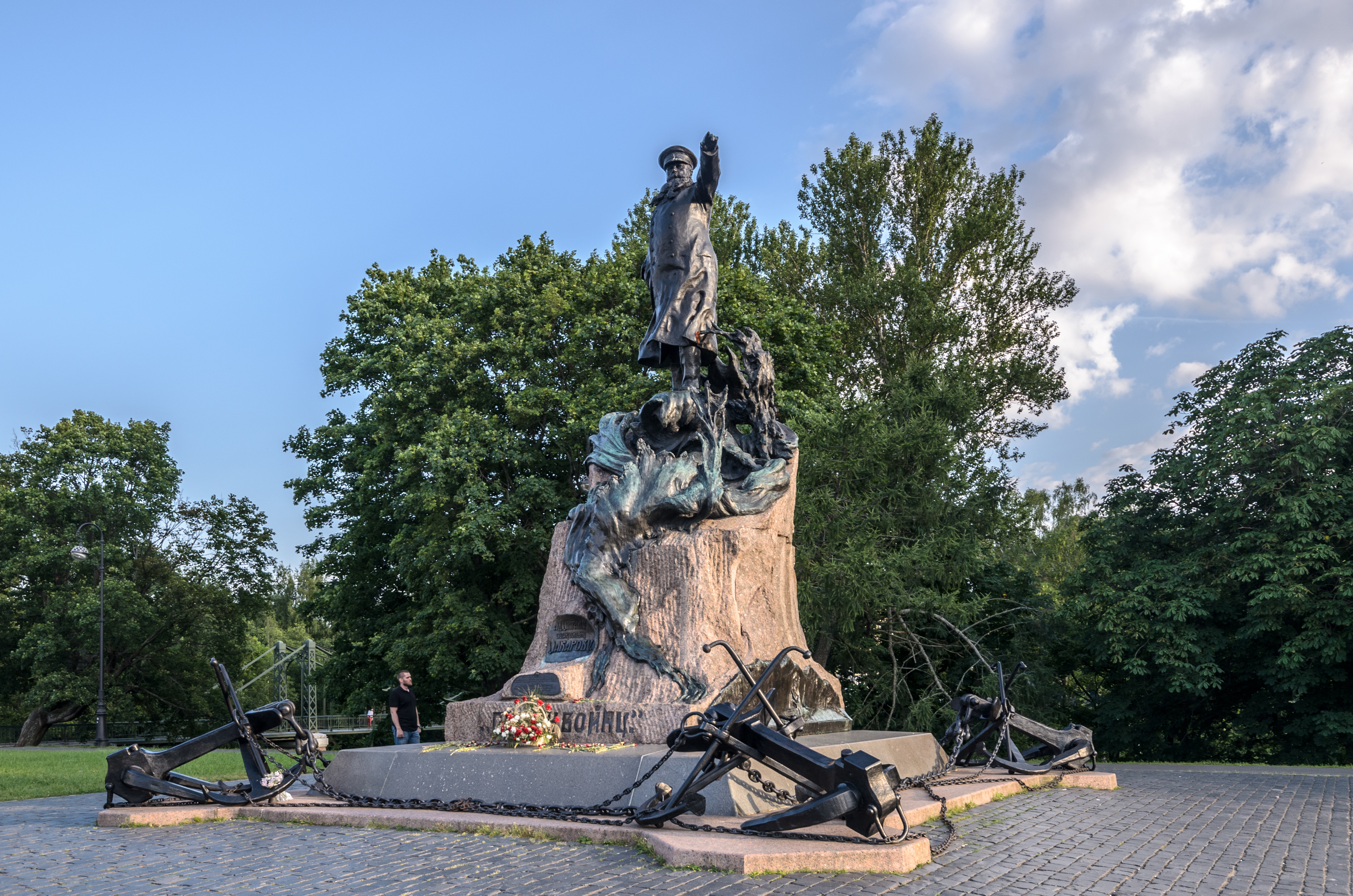
Monument to Stepan Makarov in the City of Kronstadt

There are monuments to Makarov in his native Mykolayiv, Ukraine, and in Vladivostok and Kronstadt, Russia. A number of ships have been named Admiral Makarov. An island in the Tsivolk group of the Nordenskiöld Archipelago was named after him. National University of Shipbuilding in Mykolaiv and State Maritime Academy in Saint Petersburg are named after him.

Three icebreakers have been named after Makarov. The first was a steam-powered icebreaker built in 1941 as V. Molotov that was renamed Admiral Makarov in 1956. The second Admiral Makarov was built in 1975 and remains in service as of 2015. The third one, Stepan Makarov, is an icebreaking standby vessel that was completed in 2016.

There were two streets named after Makarov in the central Ukrainian city Dnipro. On 22 February 2023 the city council of Dnipro renamed these streets.

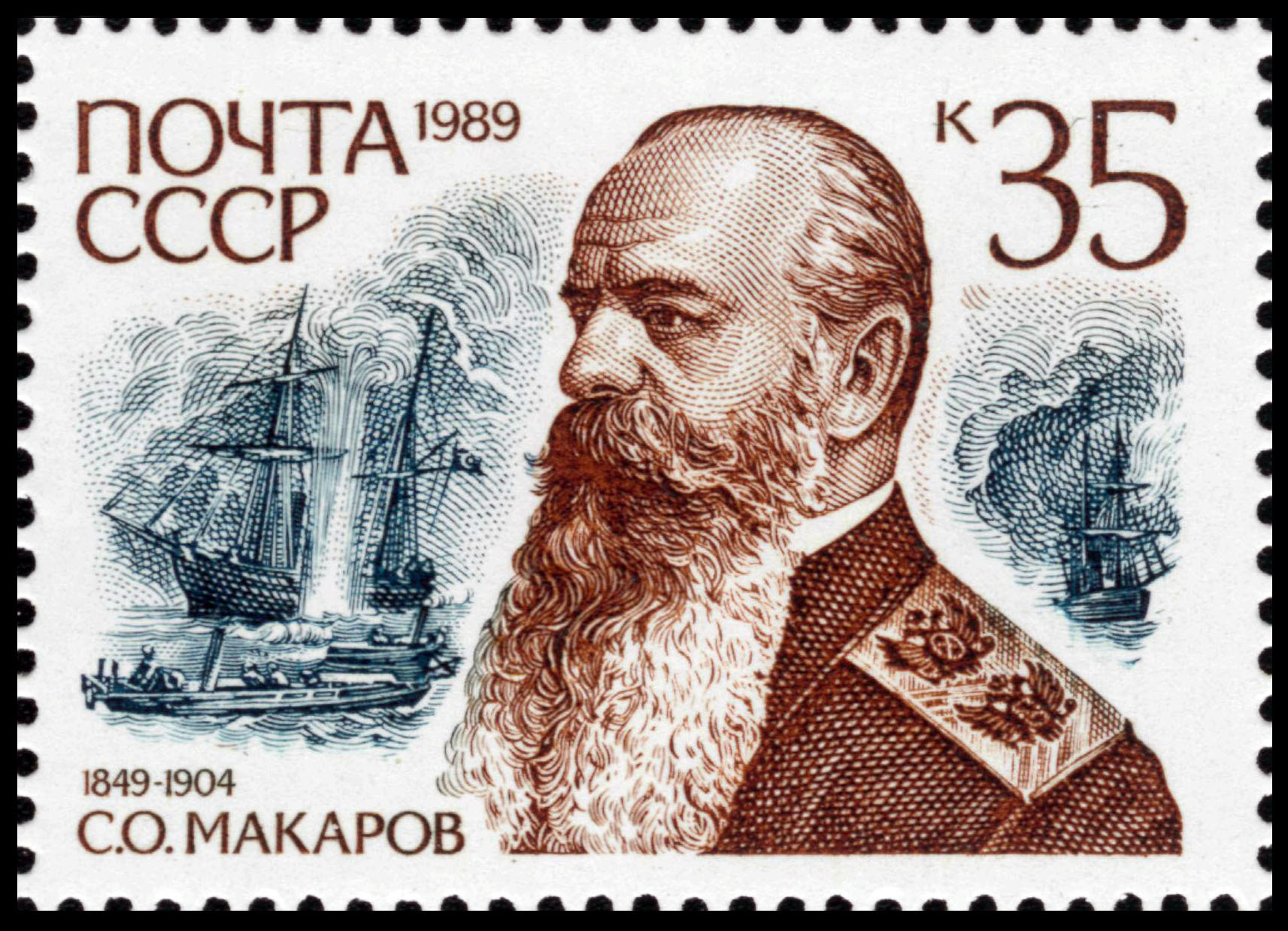
Stepan Makarov on a Soviet postage stamp

Makaroff, Manitoba, Canada is named after Admiral Makarov. Five miles west in Saskatchewan is the community of Togo, which is named after the Japanese Admiral Tōgō Heihachirō.
