= Makar, Nepal =

Makar माकर
- Location in Nepal
- Coordinates: 27.55°N 83.80°E
- Country: Nepal
- Zone: Lumbini Zone
- District: Nawalparasi District

Population (1991)
  - Total: 16,206
- Time zone: UTC+5:45 (Nepal Time)

Makar is a town in Bardaghat Municipality in Nawalparasi District in the Lumbini Zone of southern Nepal. The municipality was established on 18 May 2014 by merging existing Makar and Panchanagar VDCs. At the 1991 Nepal census, it had a population of 16,206 people living in 2,780 individual households.
