= Mākara Beach =

Seaside village in Wellington, New Zealand

Coordinates: 41°13′15″S 174°42′50″E

- Suburb
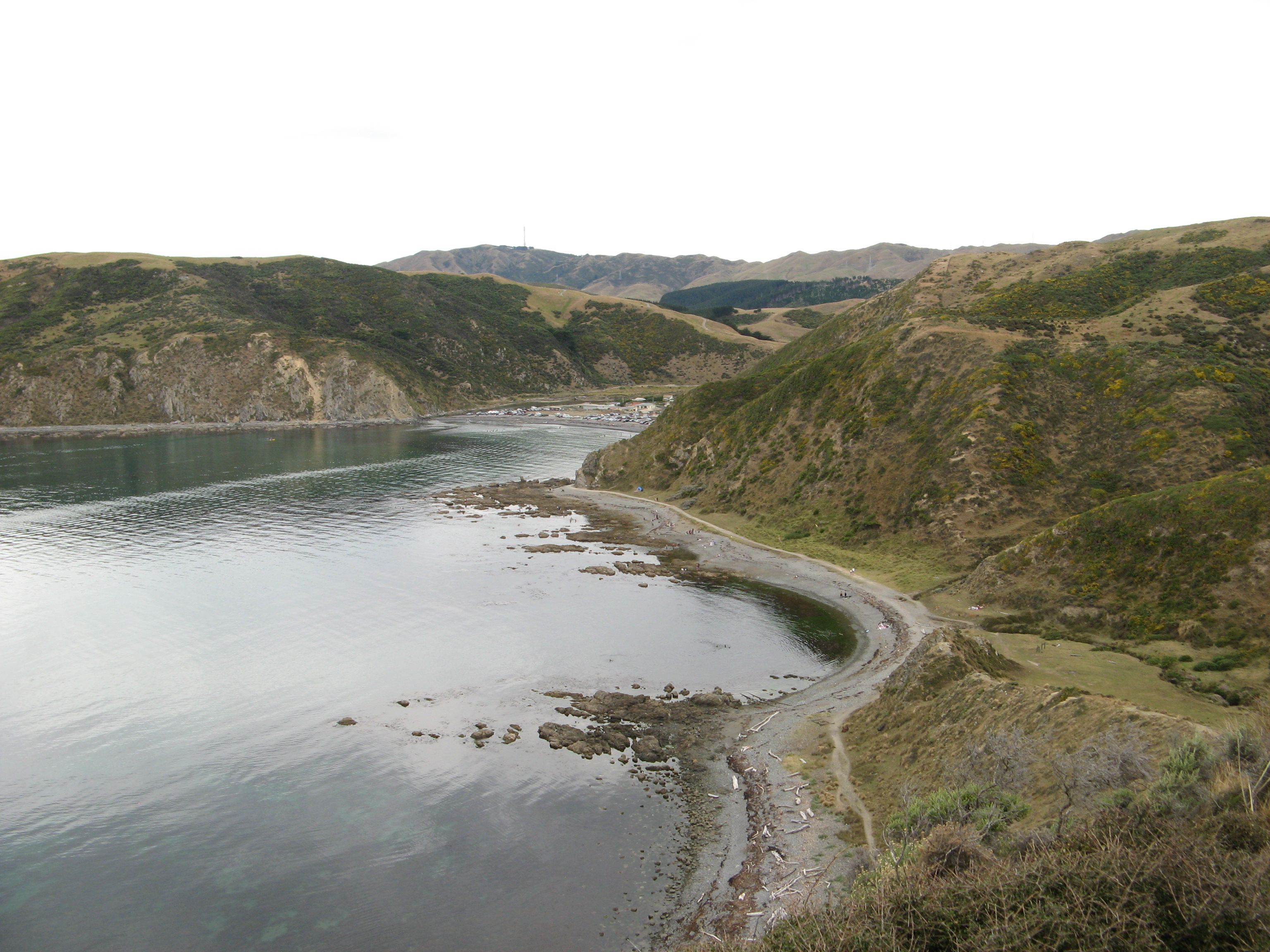
- Mākara beach
- Interactive map of Mākara Beach
- Country: New Zealand
- City: Wellington
- Local authority: Wellington City Council
- Electoral ward: Wharangi/Onslow-Western Ward
- Community board: Mākara/Ōhāriu Community Board

Area
  - Land: 1,007 ha (2,490 acres)

Population (2023)
  - Total: 189
  - Density: 18.8/km^{2} (48.6/sq mi)

(Tasman Sea)	Mākara Beach	Ohariu
		Mākara

Mākara Beach, previously spelled Makara Beach, is a suburb of Wellington, New Zealand, consisting of a small seaside village and its surrounding countryside. Wellington City Council regards it as a separate suburb to Mākara.

== Features ==
Mākara Beach is a seaside village, 20 minutes drive from the suburb of Karori. It has public toilets and a parking area for beach visitors. The beach is suitable for fishing and diving, and is a designated off-lead dog exercise area. The only retail business at Mākara Beach is a café.

The suburb is accessed through Makara Road, which enters the suburb in the south and continues north alongside Makara Stream until it reaches the coast at Ohariu Bay. This is the main bay of the suburb; the suburb also includes Warehou Bay and Smiths Bay. Makara Stream's estuary is described by Wellington City Council as "an important native ecosystem [...] gradually being restored by the Makaracarpas, a local environmental group". The Makara Foreshore Reserve was once an area of sand dunes. In 1942, these dunes were bulldozed because of fears that invading Japanese could hide in them. Rare plants are gradually re-establishing themselves in the area.

A 7 km walkway managed by the Department of Conservation starts from the village. It follows the beach and goes through farmland up to historic gun emplacements.

== History ==
Mākara pā

Ngati Ira people lived in the area around Ohariu Bay until they were displaced by invading Te Āti Awa from around 1820. Surveyor Robert Nankeville drew a map of Ohariu Pā in 1841 which shows it was then a large pā with only a few houses, located very close to the beach at the mouth of the Makara Stream. A quarter of a mile upstream on a hillside east of Makara Stream was the Ngati Tama kainga or hamlet of Te Arei, and a garden area named Kumuhore was situated on a ridge above the pā. Officials visiting the pā in 1846 and 1847 estimated that about 120 people were living there at that time.

In 1850, a report described the condition of the pā:

The road to the village is over a mountain, is difficult and available only as a footpath, principally through bush. The Pa is situated on a Reserve recently laid down by the Government under Col. McCleverty's directions, to which a considerable portion of suburban land is attached. The land comprised with the block on an average may be considered tolerably good, with a fair share of timber. All the Maori cultivations are included within the block, which are by no means extensive. In addition to this they have several head of cattle and their pigs, which are numerous, are also allowed to run at large within the boundaries. The Pa is in a state of decay, and very few of the huts are in a habitable state. Originally the Population of Ohariu was numerous, and was the principal landing place for all the canoes visiting Port Nicholson from Wanganui, Otaki, Queen Charlotte's Sound, Nelson, and the other Settlements in the Straits. It is still resorted to on these occasions. The inhabitants live principally by fishing. They cultivate little, but are frequently in the employ of Europeans at daily wages. [...] The present inhabitants are principally "Ngatitamas", who originally came from Poutama, North of Taranaki; some are Whanganuis, and Ngatiawas, and have all intermarried. [...] The North West wind is severely felt with a great sand drift. [...] The Natives on the whole appear to be healthy, but a scarcity of children. Mr Rhodes has a cattle station here. Total Native Population, 119.

Mākara Beach had a resident community of fishermen in the 19th and 20th century, using solid clinker-built dinghies. Fisherman Leopold Haupois, known as 'French Louis', had arrived from Normandy in France in 1875; in the 1930s Lady Bledisloe, the wife of the Governor-General, used to visit French Louis to practise her French conversation.

Mākara Beach was hit by Cyclone Gita in 2018. Homes were flooded and property was destroyed. The following year, a plan was announced to protect the village from future weather events caused by climate change. The plan's recommendations included raising the beach's crest level, constructing a sea wall, clearing gravel from the stream mouth, and reinforcing its bank.

During the national COVID lockdown in April 2020, residents erected a barricade and signs to keep visitors from the rest of Wellington out. While one resident said, "All we're doing is what the police are doing...telling people to go home", a lawyer told media that the public could not block roads and this could be a criminal offence.

Flooding in 2021 damaged a road that leads to Mākara Beach. It was estimated that repairs would cost NZD 1.5 million. This route to the suburb was closed for several weeks.

== Demographics ==
Mākara Beach covers 10.07 km^{2} (3.89 sq mi). It is part of the Mākara-Ohariu statistical area.

Historical population
Year	Pop.	±% p.a.
2013	168	—
2018	201	+3.65%
2023	189	−1.22%

Mākara Beach had a population of 189 in the 2023 New Zealand census, a decrease of 12 people (−6.0%) since the 2018 census, and an increase of 21 people (12.5%) since the 2013 census. There were 99 males and 87 females in 69 dwellings. 4.8% of people identified as LGBTIQ+. The median age was 47.0 years (compared with 38.1 years nationally). There were 30 people (15.9%) aged under 15 years, 30 (15.9%) aged 15 to 29, 99 (52.4%) aged 30 to 64, and 30 (15.9%) aged 65 or older.

People could identify as more than one ethnicity. The results were 88.9% European (Pākehā), 6.3% Māori, 1.6% Pasifika, and 7.9% Asian. English was spoken by 98.4%, Māori by 3.2%, and other languages by 12.7%. The percentage of people born overseas was 28.6, compared with 28.8% nationally.

Religious affiliations were 22.2% Christian, 1.6% New Age, and 3.2% other religions. People who answered that they had no religion were 66.7%, and 6.3% of people did not answer the census question.

Of those at least 15 years old, 66 (41.5%) people had a bachelor's or higher degree, 69 (43.4%) had a post-high school certificate or diploma, and 27 (17.0%) people exclusively held high school qualifications. The median income was $48,200, compared with $41,500 nationally. 39 people (24.5%) earned over $100,000 compared to 12.1% nationally. The employment status of those at least 15 was 81 (50.9%) full-time, 30 (18.9%) part-time, and 3 (1.9%) unemployed.

== In popular culture ==
James K. Baxter's poem "Makara Beach" describes the wild foreshore of the bay.

Author Yvonne du Fresne lived at Mākara Beach for more than 15 years and stated that she was influenced by the landscapes there.

In the 1980s, the village was used as the fictional town Kaihoro in Peter Jackson’s 1987 film Bad Taste.

== Gallery ==
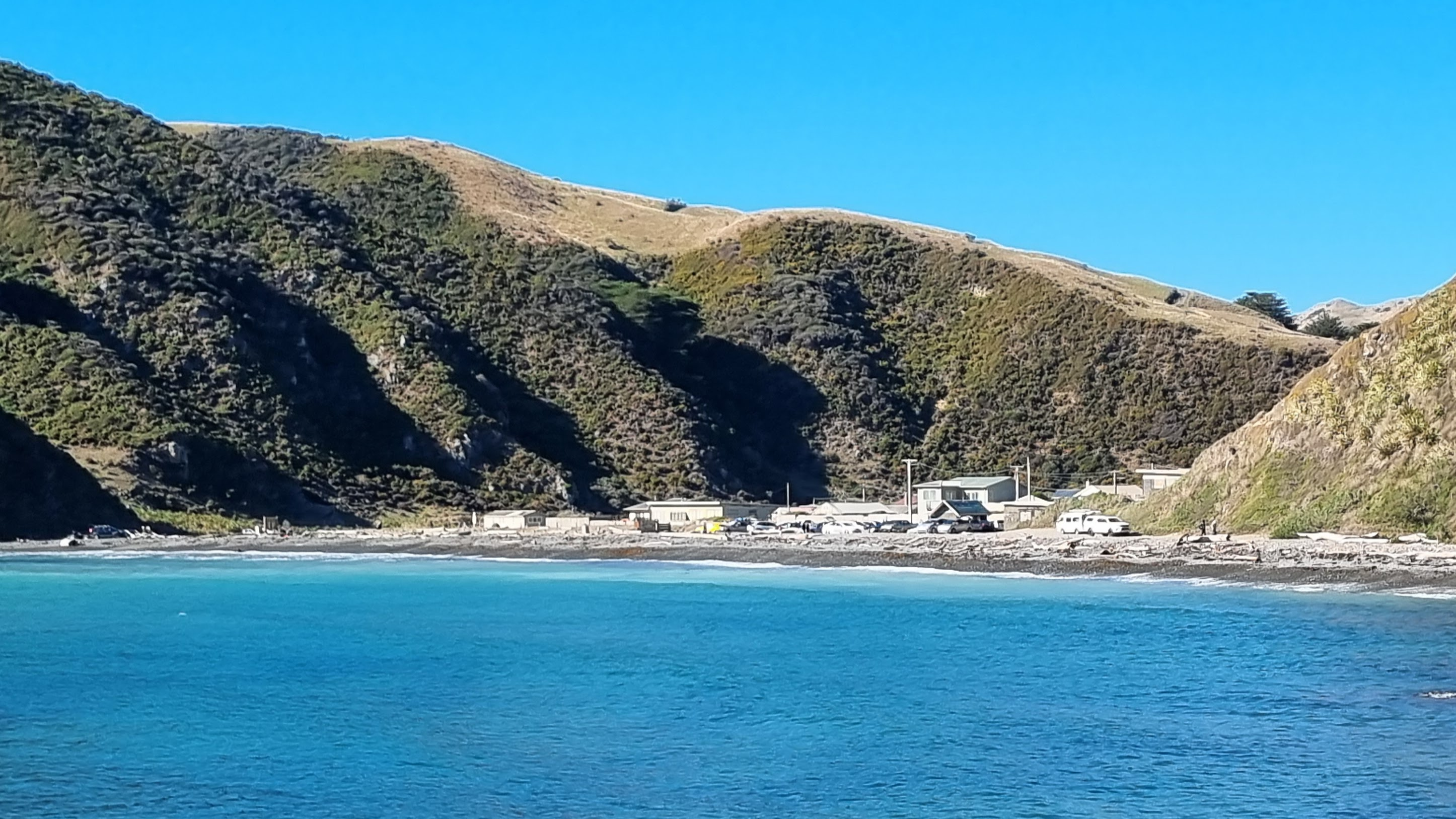
Mākara Beach village from the coastal walkway

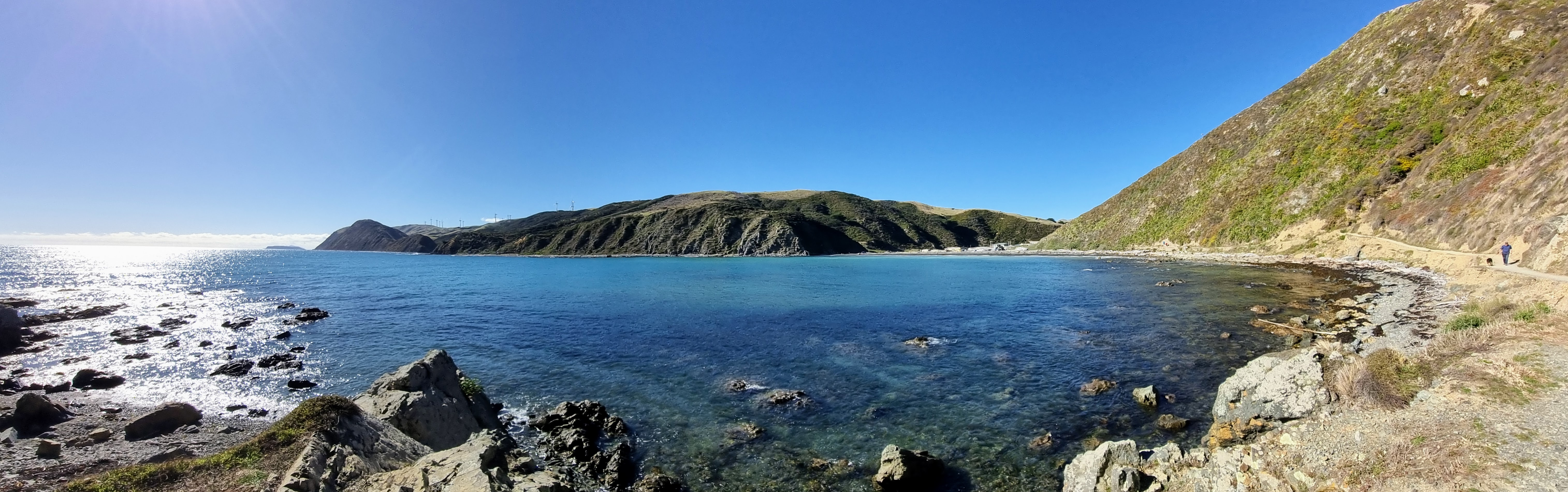
Ohariu Bay and Mākara Beach

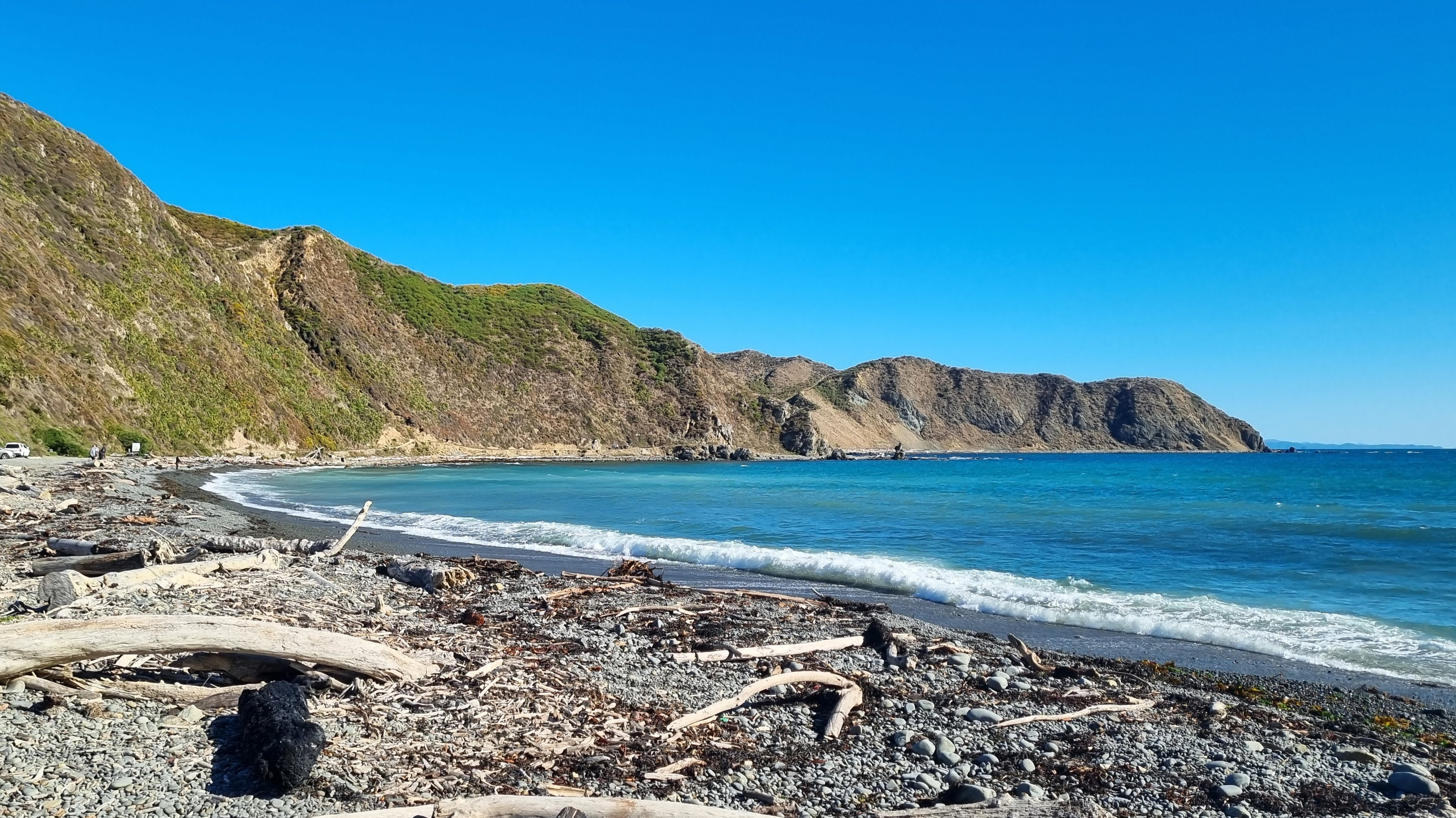
Looking west along the coast of Ohariu Bay from Mākara Beach.
