= Admiral Makarov =

Admiral Makarov may refer to:

== People ==
- Konstantin Makarov (1931–2011), Soviet Admiral of the Fleet
- Stepan Makarov (1849–1904), Russian vice admiral

== Ships ==
- Russian frigate Admiral Makarov, commissioned in 2017
- Admiral Makarov (icebreaker), completed in 1975
- Russian cruiser Admiral Makarov in service 1908–1922
- Soviet cruiser Admiral Makarov (1946), formerly the German cruiser Nürnberg
- Soviet cruiser Admiral Makarov (1970), a Kresta II-class cruiser in service 1972–1992
- Admiral Makarov, the United States Coast Guard vessel USCGC Southwind, lent to the Soviet Union between 1945 and 1949
- MV Admiral Makarov (1939), a Soviet cargo liner, later the research vessel Vityaz

== Other uses ==
- Admiral Makarov State Maritime Academy
