= Mākara =

Coordinates: 41°16′08″S 174°42′22″E

- Suburb
- View of British Peak, Mākara
- Interactive map of Mākara
- Country: New Zealand
- City: Wellington
- Local authority: Wellington City Council
- Electoral ward: Wharangi/Onslow-Western Ward
- Community board: Mākara/Ōhāriu Community Board

Area
  - Land: 7,458 ha (18,430 acres)

Population (2023)
  - Total: 249
  - Density: 3.34/km^{2} (8.65/sq mi)

		Ohariu
Mākara Beach	Mākara
		Karori

Mākara is a locality located at the western edge of Wellington, New Zealand, close to the shore of the Tasman Sea. The suburb is named after the Mākara Stream (mā is Māori for white, kara is a kind of greywacke stone).

The Wellington City Council regards the nearby Mākara Beach as a separate suburb.

With winding road access from Karori or Ohariu, Mākara is a rural area with sparse development. It has attracted people who want rural living near Wellington.

== History ==
In the nineteenth century there was a small amount of gold-mining at Terawhiti Station but no large-scale workable deposits were ever found. Tunnels associated with mining activity still exist on the hillside.

In 1921 the Makara War Memorial was unveiled, built in memory of local residents who died in World War 1, and another name was added after World War II.

There are gun emplacements at Fort Opau which still remain. These were built as part of the coastal fortifications of New Zealand due to fears of invasion during the second world war. A small foreshore reserve of sand dunes was bulldozed during this time as it was felt these could be hiding places for an invading army. This destroyed ecosystem is slowly being restored by local community groups.

The Cook Strait Cable comes ashore from the South Island at Oteranga Bay in the suburb of Mākara. The HVDC line came into operation in April 1965 and was at the time the world's largest submarine cable.

A radio receiving station was set up in 1944 in the region, at Quartz Hill, to receive overseas shortwave broadcasts for re-transmission by the New Zealand Broadcasting Service, close to the NZ Post Office Makara Radio receiving station. Subsequently from 1997 to 2007 the site was leased to a local amateur radio club, who installed equipment and multiple antennae to contact operators all over the world. In 2008, the Quartz Hill station, whose callsign was ZL6QH, closed for major amateur radio activity for the construction of a wind farm.

In 1973 Makara Riding, formerly under the jurisdiction of a County Council, came under the administration of the Wellington City Council.

West Wind, a proposal for a $380-million wind farm by Meridian Energy was approved by Wellington City Council in 2005. Opponents claimed that the project was too close to a populated area. In 2007, the Environment Court approved its construction, which began on West Wind along Terawhiti Ridge. A temporary wharf was constructed in Oteranga Bay to move turbine parts into the area without going through Wellington's Central Business District.

The 62 turbine farm was completed in 2009 and includes a recreation area. The turbines are 111 metres high and cover a 56 square-kilometre area including Quartz Hill and Terawhiti Station.

In 2019, the name of the locality was officially gazetted as Mākara.

Former post office and receiving station

Old farm house and smoke house

West Wind farm

== Demographics ==
Mākara covers 74.58 km^{2} (28.80 sq mi). It is part of the Mākara-Ohariu statistical area.

Historical population
Year	Pop.	±% p.a.
2013	252	—
2018	246	−0.48%
2023	249	+0.24%

Mākara had a population of 249 in the 2023 New Zealand census, an increase of 3 people (1.2%) since the 2018 census, and a decrease of 3 people (−1.2%) since the 2013 census. There were 129 males, 114 females, and 3 people of other genders in 99 dwellings. 6.0% of people identified as LGBTIQ+. There were 42 people (16.9%) aged under 15 years, 33 (13.3%) aged 15 to 29, 150 (60.2%) aged 30 to 64, and 27 (10.8%) aged 65 or older.

People could identify as more than one ethnicity. The results were 91.6% European (Pākehā); 18.1% Māori; 1.2% Pasifika; 2.4% Asian; 2.4% Middle Eastern, Latin American and African New Zealanders (MELAA); and 3.6% other, which includes people giving their ethnicity as "New Zealander". English was spoken by 97.6%, Māori by 4.8%, and other languages by 13.3%. No language could be spoken by 2.4% (e.g. too young to talk). The percentage of people born overseas was 24.1, compared with 28.8% nationally.

Religious affiliations were 22.9% Christian, 1.2% New Age, and 2.4% other religions. People who answered that they had no religion were 65.1%, and 9.6% of people did not answer the census question.

Of those at least 15 years old, 69 (33.3%) people had a bachelor's or higher degree, 108 (52.2%) had a post-high school certificate or diploma, and 24 (11.6%) people exclusively held high school qualifications. 51 people (24.6%) earned over $100,000 compared to 12.1% nationally. The employment status of those at least 15 was 132 (63.8%) full-time and 27 (13.0%) part-time.

Mākara Cemetery entrance

== Facilities ==
=== Parks and reserves ===
The potential of Makara as a possible recreational landscape for Wellington city was recognised from the early 1970s. There is a small boat access at the north end of Mākara Beach into the river. There is a two-hour walk from Mākara to Boom Rock if the Mākara Stream is crossed.

=== Churches and cemeteries ===
Natural burial ground at Mākara Cemetery

Mākara Cemetery is Wellington's largest cemetery, comprising 84 hectares. It was founded after Karori Cemetery edged towards full capacity in 1940, and the first burial occurred in 1965. As of 2019, it was about one third full. Mākara Cemetery also has a natural burial ground, which was the first natural cemetery established in New Zealand as a partnership between the Wellington City Council and Natural Burials in 2008.

The burial ground Ngā Iwi o Te Motu Urupā is open for Māori and their whānau in Mākara Cemetery.

St Patricks Church was built in Mākara in 1873 by the Catholic Diocese. It is now a non-denominational, community owned church and often serves as a function area alongside the Makara Hall next door.

St Matthias Church was built in 1921 and was historically associated with the Anglican Church.

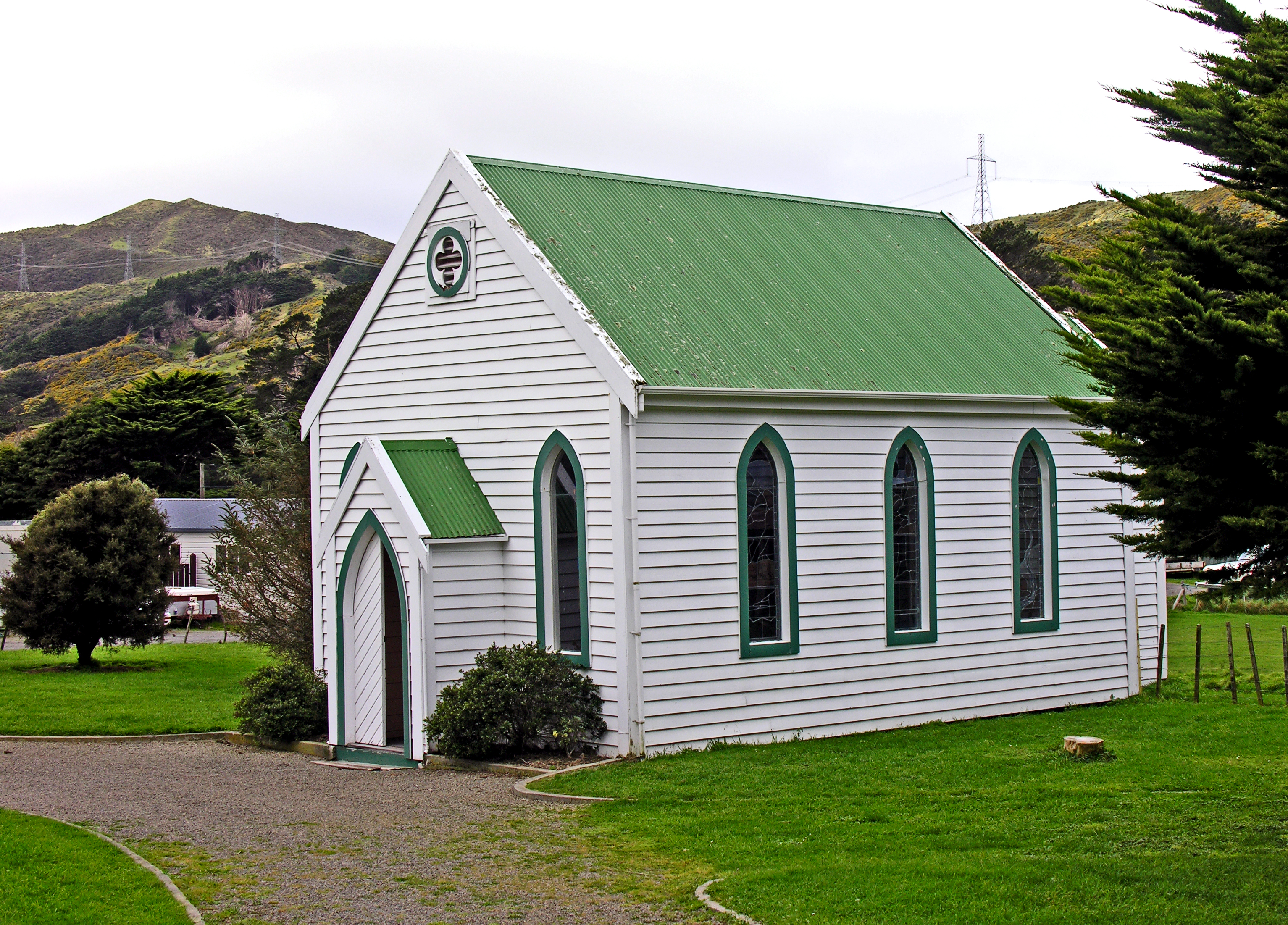
St Patrick's Catholic Church exterior

St Patrick's Catholic Church interior

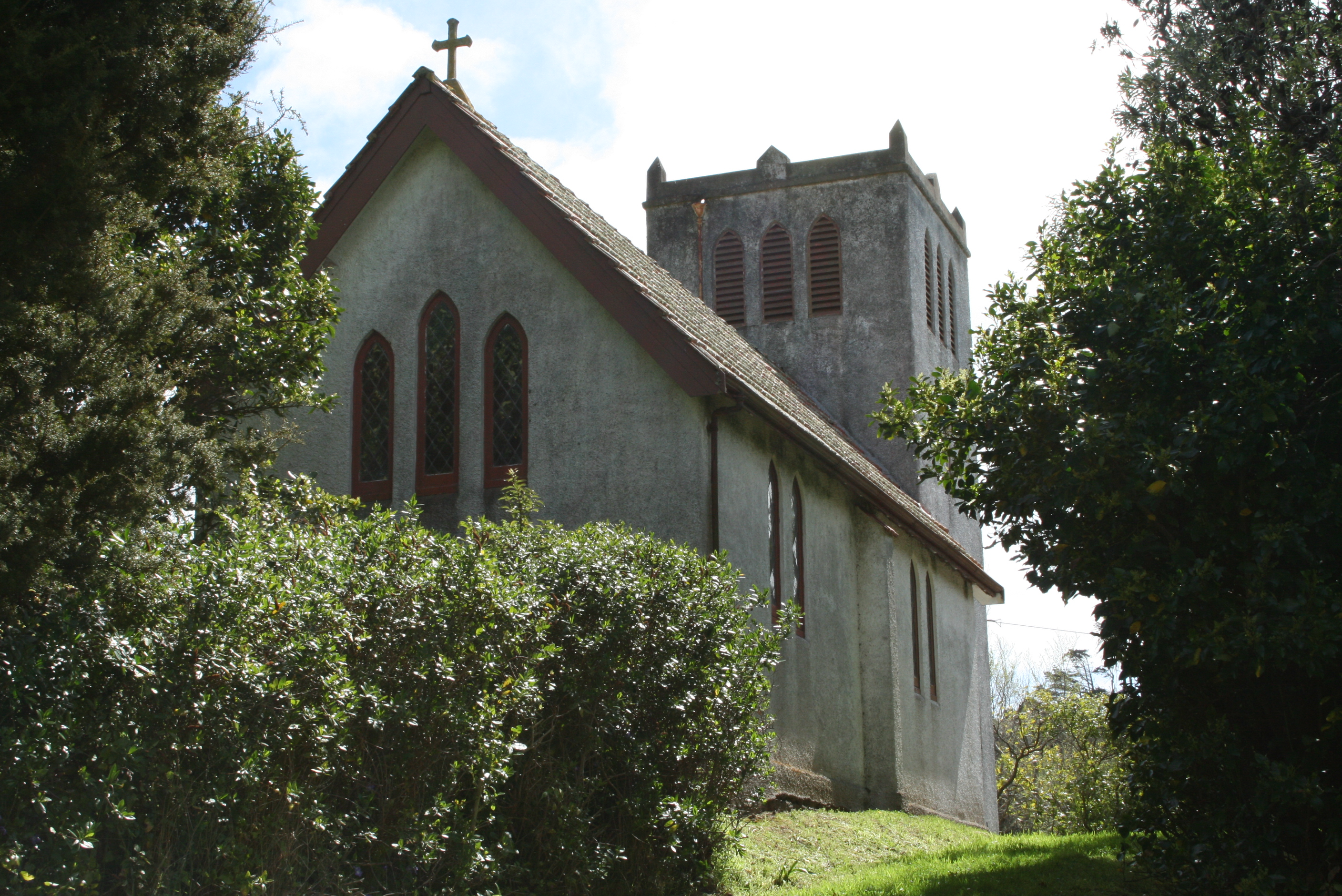
St Matthias Church and bell tower

== Education ==
Mākara Model School

Mākara Model School, a co-educational state primary school for Year 1 to 8 students, is located in Mākara. It has a roll of 63 as of July 2026.

The school is a community emergency hub.

== Climate ==
Climate data for Mākara (1951–1980)
Month	Jan	Feb	Mar	Apr	May	Jun	Jul	Aug	Sep	Oct	Nov	Dec	Year
Mean daily maximum °C (°F)	17.7 (63.9)	18.0 (64.4)	16.9 (62.4)	14.6 (58.3)	12.2 (54.0)	10.2 (50.4)	9.4 (48.9)	10.0 (50.0)	11.3 (52.3)	12.9 (55.2)	14.4 (57.9)	16.2 (61.2)	13.7 (56.6)
Daily mean °C (°F)	14.9 (58.8)	15.2 (59.4)	14.3 (57.7)	12.3 (54.1)	10.0 (50.0)	8.2 (46.8)	7.4 (45.3)	7.8 (46.0)	9.0 (48.2)	10.5 (50.9)	11.8 (53.2)	13.5 (56.3)	11.2 (52.2)
Mean daily minimum °C (°F)	12.0 (53.6)	12.3 (54.1)	11.6 (52.9)	9.9 (49.8)	7.7 (45.9)	6.1 (43.0)	5.3 (41.5)	5.6 (42.1)	6.7 (44.1)	8.0 (46.4)	9.2 (48.6)	10.8 (51.4)	8.8 (47.8)
Average rainfall mm (inches)	75 (3.0)	66 (2.6)	86 (3.4)	105 (4.1)	129 (5.1)	132 (5.2)	144 (5.7)	133 (5.2)	98 (3.9)	94 (3.7)	79 (3.1)	92 (3.6)	1,233 (48.6)
Mean monthly sunshine hours	195	164	152	126	102	101	102	108	132	158	168	177	1,685
Source: NIWA

== See also ==
- Project West Wind wind farm and Makara Guardians
- Terawhiti Station
