= Makarovsky, Vologda Oblast =

Makarovsky Макаровский
- Settlement
- Location within Vologda Oblast Location within Russia
- Coordinates: 59°32′N 44°34′E
- Country: Russia
- Region: Vologda Oblast
- District: Nikolsky District
- Time zone: UTC+3:00

Makarovsky (Russian: Макаровский) is a rural locality (a settlement) in Kemskoye Rural Settlement, Nikolsky District, Vologda Oblast, Russia. The population was 153 as of 2002.

== Geography ==
Makarovsky is located 62 km west of Nikolsk (the district's administrative centre) by road. Verkhovino is the nearest rural locality.
