= Makarovskoye, Republic of Dagestan =

Makarovskoye Макаровское Макар
- Selo
- Location within Republic of Dagestan Location within Russia
- Coordinates: 44°07′N 46°53′E
- Country: Russia
- Region: Republic of Dagestan
- District: Kizlyarsky District
- Time zone: UTC+3:00

Makarovskoye (Russian: Макаровское; Nogai: Макар, Makar) is a rural locality (a selo) in Bolsheareshevsky Selsoviet, Kizlyarsky District, Republic of Dagestan, Russia. The population was 304 as of 2010. There are 3 streets.

== Geography ==
Makarovskoye is located 37 km northeast of Kizlyar (the district's administrative centre) by road. Bolshaya Areshevka and Novye Bukhty are the nearest rural localities.

== Nationalities ==
Nogais, Dargins and Avars live there.
