= Admiral Makarov State University of Maritime and Inland Shipping =

Institution of higher education in St. Petersburg, Russia

- Государственный университет морского и речного флота имени адмирала С. О. Макарова
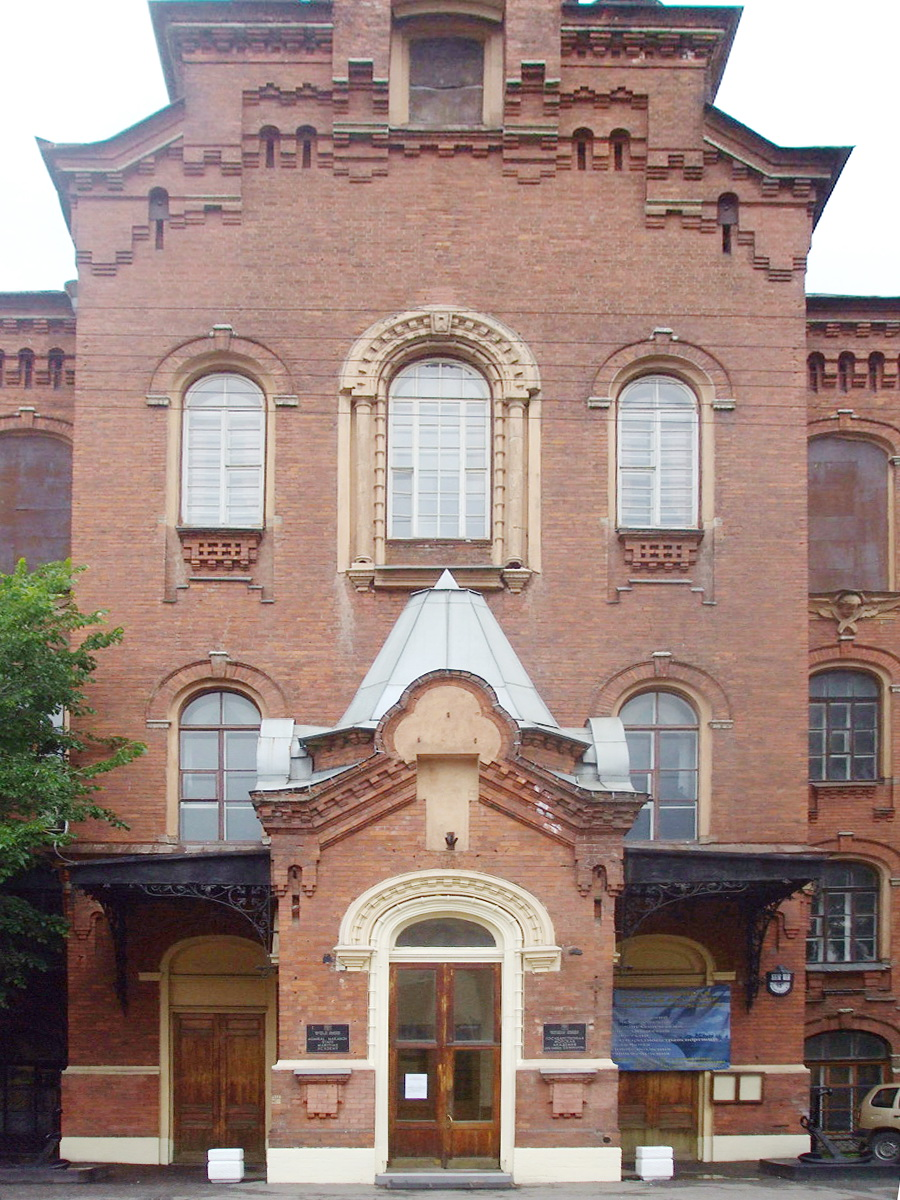
- Former name: Admiral Makarov State Maritime Academy
- Motto in English: TvGU — Your guarantor of success
- Type: Public
- Established: 1809 (2012 in current form)
- Founder: P. Maksimovich
- Location: Dvinskaya 5/7,, Saint Petersburg, Russia; 59°54′35″N 30°14′59″E
- Campus: Urban
- Website: gumrf.ru

Admiral Makarov State University of Maritime and Inland Shipping (Russian: Государственный университет морского и речного флота имени адмирала С. О. Макарова) is a federal institution of higher professional education (ФБОУ ВПО) which trains professionals for civil and merchant fleet.

== History ==
The history of the universities that formed GUMRF began on December 2, 1809, when in accordance with the Manifesto on the Establishment of Ministries issued by Alexander I the Department of Water Communications and the Expedition for the Construction of Roads in the State were transformed into the Administration of Water and Land Communications and the Corps of Railway Engineers was created. French transport communications design engineers Pierre-Dominique Bazaine, Alexander Fabre, Karl Pote, Moris Destrem taught at the new institute. In 1930, the Institute of Railway Engineers was reorganized into industry-specific educational institutions, and on April 1, 1930, the Leningrad Institute of Water Transport Engineers was created, training specialists in three faculties: hydraulic engineering, mechanical and operational. On May 7, 1876, by decree of Emperor Alexander II, the nautical classes of the Saint Petersburg River Yacht Club were formed, which laid the foundation for the State Maritime Academy. On May 6, 1902, Nicholas II established a long-distance navigation school on the basis of the nautical classes. Since 1905, in addition to navigators, the school began to train marine engineers.

In February 1919, a naval technical school was created.

Since 1949, the educational institution has been named after Admiral Stepan Makarov. After merging with the Higher Arctic Marine School, the Admiral Makarov Leningrad Higher Marine Engineering School was formed. In 1959, the university was merged with the Central Research Institute of River Fleet

In 1985-1987 the school took part in an unusual scientific research (scientific historical reenactment). The expedition of the Soviet Geographical Society and Institute of Archaeology of the Academy of Sciences of the USSR was a reconstruction of the passage along the medieval trade route "from the Varangians to the Greeks". More than 100 people took part in the expedition, but the crews of the sailing ships were made up of cadets from this school. As a result, it was experimentally proven that on the merchant sailing ships typical for the 9th - 11th centuries, the 2,720 km route from the Baltic Sea to the Black Sea could be covered in 90-95 days' passages. In 1990 it received the status of and academy.

The institution was established by the merger of two much older institutions on 11 September 2012, by order of the Minister of Transport of the Russian Federation, Maksim Sokolov: It is located in St. Petersburg, Russia. The Admiral Makarov State Maritime Academy (Russian: Государственная морская академия имени адмирала С. О. Макарова) and the Saint Petersburg State University of Water Communications (Russian: Санкт-Петербургский государственный университет водных коммуникаций).
