= Makarovskaya, Irkutsk Oblast =

Makarovskaya Макаровская
- Village
- Location within Irkutsk Oblast Location within Russia
- Coordinates: 53°11′N 103°28′E
- Country: Russia
- Region: Irkutsk Oblast
- District: Bokhansky District
- Time zone: UTC+8:00

Makarovskaya (Russian: Макаровская) is a rural locality (a village) in Bokhansky District, Irkutsk Oblast, Russia. Population: 47 (2010 census);

== Geography ==
This rural locality is located 21 kilometres (13 mi) from Bokhan (the district's administrative centre), 114 kilometres (71 mi) from Irkutsk (capital of Irkutsk Oblast) and 4,396 kilometres (2,732 mi) from Moscow. Vanteyevskaya is the nearest rural locality.
