= Makarov, Russia =

Town in Sakhalin Oblast, Russia

Makarov Макаров
- Town
- Coat of arms
- Interactive map of Makarov
- Location of Makarov Makarov (Sakhalin Oblast)
- Coordinates: 48°38′N 142°48′E
- Country: Russia
- Federal subject: Sakhalin Oblast
- Administrative district: Makarovsky District
- Founded: 1892
- Town status since: 1946
- Elevation: 20 m (66 ft)

Population (2010 Census)
  - Total: 6,705
  - Estimate (2023): 5,691 (−15.1%)

Administrative status
  - Capital of: Makarovsky District

Municipal status
  - Urban okrug: Makarovsky Urban Okrug
  - Capital of: Makarovsky Urban Okrug
- Time zone: UTC+11 (MSK+8)
- Postal code: 694140
- Dialing code: +7 42443
- OKTMO ID: 64724000001

Makarov (Russian: Мака́ров) is a coastal town and the administrative center of Makarovsky District of Sakhalin Oblast, Russia, located on the eastern coast of the Sakhalin Island, 235 kilometers (146 mi) north of Yuzhno-Sakhalinsk. Population: 6,705 (2010 census); 7,271 (2002 census); 11,351 (1989 Soviet census).

== History ==
It was founded in 1892. It was called Shiritoru (知取町) in 1905–1945 when the southern part of Sakhalin belonged to Japan. It was renamed Makarov (after the Russian admiral Stepan Makarov) and granted town status in 1946.

== Administrative and municipal status ==
Within the framework of administrative divisions, Makarov serves as the administrative center of Makarovsky District and is subordinated to it. As a municipal division, the town of Makarov and ten rural localities of Makarovsky District are incorporated as Makarovsky Urban Okrug.
