= Makarovsky, Uryupinsky District, Volgograd Oblast =

Makarovsky Макаровский
- Khutor
- Location within Volgograd Oblast Location within Russia
- Coordinates: 50°39′N 41°44′E
- Country: Russia
- Region: Volgograd Oblast
- District: Uryupinsky District
- Time zone: UTC+4:00

Makarovsky (Russian: Макаровский) is a rural locality (a khutor) in Rossoshinskoye Rural Settlement, Uryupinsky District, Volgograd Oblast, Russia. The population was 4 as of 2010.

== Geography ==
Makarovsky is located in the steppe region, 37 km southwest of Uryupinsk (the district's administrative centre) by road. Bryansky is the nearest rural locality.
