= Makarovskaya, Kharovsky District, Vologda Oblast =

Makarovskaya Макаровская
- Village
- Location within Vologda Oblast Location within Russia
- Coordinates: 60°11′N 40°37′E
- Country: Russia
- Region: Vologda Oblast
- District: Kharovsky District
- Time zone: UTC+3:00

Makarovskaya (Russian: Макаровская) is a rural locality (a village) in Slobodskoye Rural Settlement, Kharovsky District, Vologda Oblast, Russia. The population was 18 as of 2002.

== Geography ==
Makarovskaya is located 42 km northeast of Kharovsk (the district's administrative centre) by road. Polutikha is the nearest rural locality.
