= Panchanagar =

Panchanagar पञ्चनगर Bhutaha
- Small Town
- Location in Nepal
- Coordinates: 27.55°N 83.76°E
- Country: Nepal
- Zone: Lumbini Province
- District: Nawalparasi ( Bardaghat Susta West) District

Government
  - Type: Ward Council Government
  - Ward Head: Chandrakanta Chapagain

Population (2021)
  - Total: 11,530
  - Density: 263/km^{2} (680/sq mi)
- Time zone: UTC+5:45 (Nepal Time)
- Postal code: 33007
- Area code: 058

Panchanagar Rural Municipality, which merged with Bardaghat Municipality on May 18, 2014, is now called Bhutaha (Panchanagar). Bhutaha is located in the Lumbini Province. It is split into 4 wards after the government merged 2 more rural municipality into the municipality in 2014.

== Brief description ==
According to the 2021 Nepal census, Panchanagar had a population of 11,530 people living in 2,423 individual households. This VDC lies near the Chure Hilly Range. Panchanagar borders Sarawal Rural Municipality in the west and south, and Bardaghat Municipality Ward 2 in the east.

The wards are home to a diverse population, including Brahmins, Chetris, Newars, Magars, Tharus, Tamangs, Gurungs, Thakuris, and aboriginal people. The main languages spoken in the wards are Nepali, Magar.

The wards are largely agricultural, with a majority of the population engaged in farming. There is also a growing industrial sector in the area, with factories producing textiles, Garments, Clothes, furniture, and food products.

== Infrastructure ==
The literacy rate in the wards is over 85%, which is quite good compared to other places in Nepal. There's the total of 7 Schools in panchanagar area.

There's the 3 story tall health post just completed in panchanagar.

The wards are well-connected to the rest of the municipality and the country. They are served by a number of roads, including the Mahendra Highway, which runs through the area. There are also several bus routes that connect the wards to other parts of the municipality and the country.

== Tourism ==
The Simsar Taal is a small lake within Panchanagar. It attracts domestic tourists. Currently, Simsar is under construction, and in the future, it is hoped that many domestic and international tourists will be attracted to the location and beauty of the lake. Bhutaha is connected with Sansarkot, where we can see the Annapurna and Dhaulagiri mountain region. There are also some waterfalls and natural pools within Bhutaha. There are a number of festivals and cultural events held in the wards throughout the year, including Lakhe, Maghe Sakranti, and Chath. Approximately 98% of the population are Hindus.

== Sports ==
Bhutaha, a part of Panchanagar, has produced some of the best Nepali football players. Bimal Gharti Magar, a Nepali national football player, was born and raised in Bhutaha.

Panchanagar also has a football ground and a cricket ground. Every year, a football tournament is held with domestic football stars.
