= Makarovsky, Chernyshkovsky District, Volgograd Oblast =

Makarovsky Макаровский
- Khutor
- Location within Volgograd Oblast Location within Russia
- Coordinates: 48°26′N 42°21′E
- Country: Russia
- Region: Volgograd Oblast
- District: Chernyshkovsky District
- Time zone: UTC+4:00

Makarovsky (Russian: Макаровский) is a rural locality (a khutor) in Krasnoyarskoye Rural Settlement, Chernyshkovsky District, Volgograd Oblast, Russia. The population was 112 as of 2010. There are 4 streets.

== Geography ==
Makarovsky is located 12 km northeast of Chernyshkovsky (the district's administrative centre) by road. Krasnoyarsky is the nearest rural locality.
