= Terawhiti Station =

Sheep station in New Zealand

Coordinates: 41°19′59.8″S 174°39′37.52″E

Terawhiti Jack
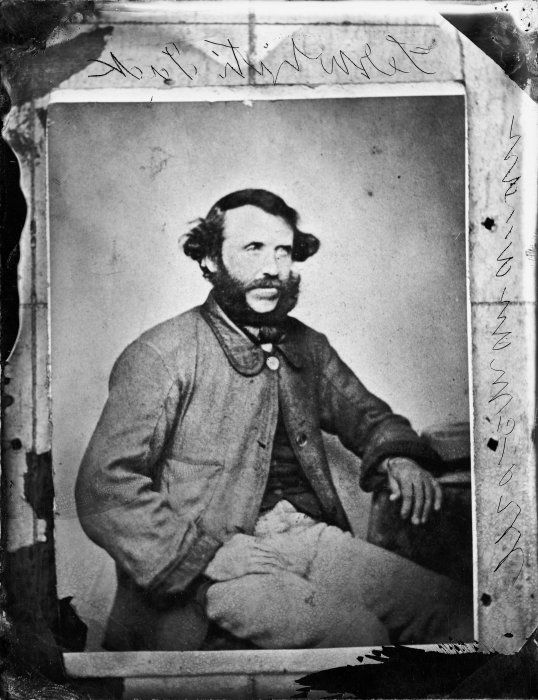
- James McMenamen (Terawhiti Jack)

Terawhiti Station is one of New Zealand's oldest and largest sheep stations, located along the south coast of Wellington. Terawhiti Station has seen a diverse range of land uses over the past 160 years. Originally a cattle station, Terawhiti grew into one of New Zealand's largest sheep stations before returning to cattle in 1993. The station originally consisted of the upraised marine terrace at Tongue Point on Wellington's south coast and was purchased by two Wellington businessmen Samuel Revans and William Mein Smith following the sale of Crown 'waste lands'. Captain William Barnard Rhodes later bought Revans’s land at Tongue Point stocking it with shorthorn cattle. His young manager, James McMenamen (known as Terawhiti Jack), later bought the Tongue Point farm and neighbouring blocks, forming Terawhiti Station and (later) Te Kamaru Station (at Te Ika a maru Bay).

Today the station is approximately 13,000 acres (53 km^{2}) in size, running from Te Ika a Maru Bay in the north, down to Karori Stream in the south and Cape Terawhiti in the West.

The area boasts a rich and varied history. Gold mining was prominent on the station during the 19th century. The first alluvial rush began in the 1850s, while the more concerted effort to extract gold from Cape Terawhiti followed in the 1880s. The latter of which failed to provide an economic return. Problems arose when miners encountered the fragmented geological landforms that make up much of the Wellington region. While payable quartz veins, containing gold, would be located, these seams come to an abrupt end, making mining a fragmented, and expensive exercise. This eventually caused the demise of gold mining on Cape Terawhiti. The company to expend the most time and money into the Terawhiti goldfield was the Albion Gold Mining Company. The Albion Battery, built in 1883, is one of the last remaining remnants of the short-lived gold rush.

The farm still remains in the family of James McMenamen's descendants. Wind farming is seen as a new chapter of land-use in the ongoing story of survival in this harsh landscape. Meridian Energy completed the 62 turbine Project West Wind in 2009 in Mākara over the combined project area of Terawhiti Station and Makara Farm. The energy produced by Project West Wind has a capacity of 143 MW – enough power for all the houses in Wellington City, Lower Hutt, Upper Hutt and Porirua.
