= Makar Shevtsov =

Russian footballer

Personal information
- Full name: Makar Sergeyevich Shevtsov
- Date of birth: 9 January 1980 (age 46)
- Place of birth: Maykop, Russian SFSR
- Height: 1.67 m (5 ft 5 1/2 in)
- Position: Forward

Youth career
- FC Uralan Elista

Senior career*
Years	Team	Apps	(Gls)
1997	FC Uralan-d Elista (amateur)		
1998–2000	FC Uralan Elista	3	(0)
2001	FC Druzhba Maykop	1	(0)
- * Club domestic league appearances and goals

Makar Sergeyevich Shevtsov (Russian: Макар Сергеевич Шевцов; born 9 January 1980 in Maykop) is a former Russian football player.
