= Makar (surname) =

Makar is the surname of the following people

- Cale Makar (born 1998), Canadian hockey player
- Dzmitry Makar (born 1981), Belarusian football player
- Jimmy Makar (born 1956), American car racing official
- Morena Makar (born 1985), Croatian snowboarder
- Nancy Hogshead-Makar (born 1962), American swimmer
- Oksana Makar (1993-2012), Ukrainian murder victim, see Murder of Oksana Makar
- Scott Makar, American lawyer, college professor and judge
- Taylor Makar (born 2001), Canadian hockey player
- Volodymyr Makar (born 1990), Ukrainian football player
