= Parasi, India =

Parasi
- Census town
- Interactive map of Parasi
- Coordinates: 24.190821°N 82.781746°E
- Country: India
- State: Uttar Pradesh
- District: Sonbhadra

Population (2001)
  - Total: 21,203

Languages
  - Official: Hindi
- Time zone: UTC+5:30 (IST)
- Postal code: 231218

Parasi is a census town in Sonbhadra district in the Indian state of Uttar Pradesh.

== Demographics ==
As of 2001 India census, Parasi had a population of 21,203. Males constitute 56% of the population and females 44%. Parasi has an average literacy rate of 74%, higher than the national average of 59.5%: male literacy is 81%, and female literacy is 65%. In Parasi, 14% of the population is under 6 years of age.
