= Ohariu, New Zealand =

Suburb of Wellington City, New Zealand

Coordinates: 41°13′25″S 174°44′38″E

Ohariu
- Suburb
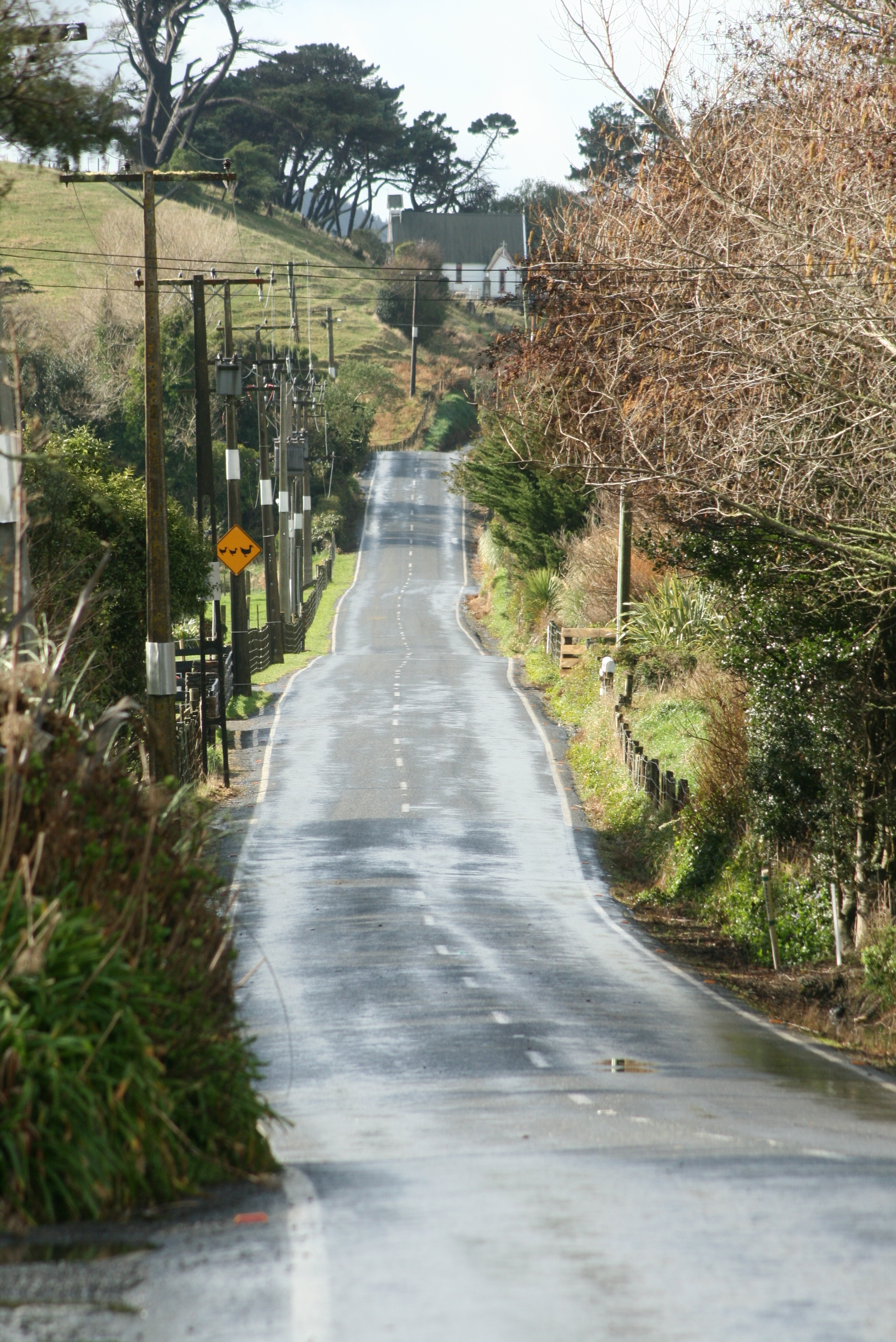
- Ohariu Valley Rd
- Interactive map of Ohariu
- Country: New Zealand
- City: Wellington
- Local authority: Wellington City Council
- Electoral ward: Takapū/Northern Ward; Te Whanganui-a-Tara Māori Ward
- Community board: Mākara/Ōhāriu Community Board

Area
  - Land: 4,680 ha (11,600 acres)

Population (2023 census)
  - Total: 414
  - Density: 8.85/km^{2} (22.9/sq mi)

		Churton Park
	Ohariu
Mākara		Johnsonville

Ohariu (or Ohariu Valley) is a suburb of Wellington, New Zealand. It is a rural area, located 5 kilometres (3.1 mi) from Khandallah.

The name is a corruption of Owhariu, where, according to Māori mythology, Kupe dried the sails of his canoe. The area is governed by the Mākara / Ōhāriu Community Board.

The name of the locality has given its name to two general electorates: Ōhāriu (first formed for the 1978 election without macrons) and Ohariu-Belmont (which existed from 1996 to 2008).

== History ==
In the 19th century, Ohariu was divided into Country Sections by the New Zealand Company. Many were sold to absentee owners, and there were only three resident settlers in 1854: James Smith, James Hallett and James Holder. Later settlers from the 1860s were James Bryant and his sons of Huia Farm, Thomas Bassett of Willow Bank, Charles Austin, George Best, and George Beech. Initially farms ran sheep and beef cattle.

Access was by tracks from Awarua Street (Ngaio), Khandallah and Johnsonville; from the 1860s by the Old Coach Road, and in 1908 via Ironside Road to Johnsonville.

From 1916 there was a dairying invasion which lasted fifty years, because of a better return than from sheep. It began when Frank Nossiter bought Alf Kirby's 100 acre (41 ha) sheep farm, and moved 25 cows from Fielding to his Catewell Farm. He was joined by a dozen more dairy farmers.

Ohariu Valley has an article from 1896 in The Cyclopedia of New Zealand.

== Demographics ==
Ohariu covers 46.80 km^{2} (18.07 sq mi). It is part of the Mākara-Ohariu statistical area.

Historical population for Ohariu
Year	Pop.	±% p.a.
2013	360	—
2018	408	+2.53%
2023	414	+0.29%

Ohariu had a population of 414 in the 2023 New Zealand census, an increase of 6 people (1.5%) since the 2018 census, and an increase of 54 people (15.0%) since the 2013 census. There were 198 males, 213 females, and 3 people of other genders in 144 dwellings. 3.6% of people identified as LGBTIQ+. There were 66 people (15.9%) aged under 15 years, 78 (18.8%) aged 15 to 29, 225 (54.3%) aged 30 to 64, and 54 (13.0%) aged 65 or older.

People could identify as more than one ethnicity. The results were 96.4% European (Pākehā), 5.8% Māori, 3.6% Pasifika, 5.8% Asian, and 2.9% other, which includes people giving their ethnicity as "New Zealander". English was spoken by 100.0%, Māori by 1.4%, and other languages by 10.1%. New Zealand Sign Language was known by 0.7%. The percentage of people born overseas was 18.8, compared with 28.8% nationally.

Religious affiliations were 29.7% Christian, 1.4% Hindu, 0.7% New Age, and 0.7% other religions. People who answered that they had no religion were 65.9%, and 3.6% of people did not answer the census question.

Of those at least 15 years old, 129 (37.1%) people had a bachelor's or higher degree, 177 (50.9%) had a post-high school certificate or diploma, and 51 (14.7%) people exclusively held high school qualifications. 126 people (36.2%) earned over $100,000 compared to 12.1% nationally. The employment status of those at least 15 was 201 (57.8%) full-time, 69 (19.8%) part-time, and 6 (1.7%) unemployed.

=== Mākara-Ohariu statistical area ===
Mākara-Ohariu statistical area covers 177.20 km^{2} (68.42 sq mi), and includes Mākara and Mākara Beach. It had an estimated population of 1,020 as of June 2025, with a population density of 5.8 people per km^{2}.

Historical population for the statistical area
Year	Pop.	±% p.a.
2006	768	—
2013	846	+1.39%
2018	945	+2.24%
2023	978	+0.69%
The 2006 population is for a larger area of 177.49 km^{2}. Source:

Mākara-Ohariu had a population of 978 in the 2023 New Zealand census, an increase of 33 people (3.5%) since the 2018 census, and an increase of 132 people (15.6%) since the 2013 census. There were 501 males, 471 females, and 6 people of other genders in 363 dwellings. 4.9% of people identified as LGBTIQ+. The median age was 42.7 years (compared with 38.1 years nationally). There were 156 people (16.0%) aged under 15 years, 165 (16.9%) aged 15 to 29, 534 (54.6%) aged 30 to 64, and 123 (12.6%) aged 65 or older.

People could identify as more than one ethnicity. The results were 92.6% European (Pākehā); 8.6% Māori; 2.8% Pasifika; 4.3% Asian; 0.9% Middle Eastern, Latin American and African New Zealanders (MELAA); and 3.7% other, which includes people giving their ethnicity as "New Zealander". English was spoken by 98.8%, Māori by 3.1%, and other languages by 11.7%. No language could be spoken by 1.2% (e.g. too young to talk). New Zealand Sign Language was known by 0.6%. The percentage of people born overseas was 23.0, compared with 28.8% nationally.

Religious affiliations were 27.6% Christian, 0.6% Hindu, 0.3% Islam, 0.3% Buddhist, 0.6% New Age, and 1.2% other religions. People who answered that they had no religion were 63.5%, and 6.1% of people did not answer the census question.

Of those at least 15 years old, 309 (37.6%) people had a bachelor's or higher degree, 387 (47.1%) had a post-high school certificate or diploma, and 129 (15.7%) people exclusively held high school qualifications. The median income was $59,400, compared with $41,500 nationally. 240 people (29.2%) earned over $100,000 compared to 12.1% nationally. The employment status of those at least 15 was 477 (58.0%) full-time, 138 (16.8%) part-time, and 12 (1.5%) unemployed.
