= Oleg Makara =

Oleg Makara-Kalmáry
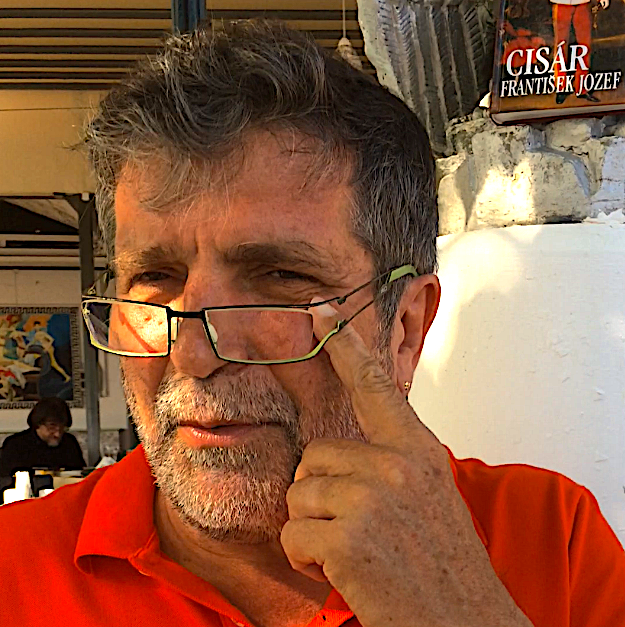
- Makara in 2019
- Born: October 13, 1954 (age 71); Sobrance, Czechoslovakia
- Other name: Makarra-Kalmáry
- Occupations: director, screenwriter
- Relatives: Saša Makarová (sister)

Oleg Makara-Kalmáry (born October 13, 1954) is a Slovak film director, screenwriter and writer.

== Biography ==
In 1969, he wrote his debut as a screenwriter Pozlátené dievča at the age of 14 and soon after screenplay for seven-part serial fairy tales "Fairy Tales from Old Forest" (co-author Juraj Bernáth for STV Košice). He then went on to study film directing at All States Institute (now Gerasimov Institute of Cinematography) in Moscow under Roman Karmen. A nickname is after his grandfather, art carpenter Eduard Kalmáry. E. Kalmáry was a chief manager of water sawmill in Remetské Hámre, East Slovakia, owned by the Vanderbilt family.

He directed and wrote scenarios for Film Studio Koliba, Slovak Television (Slovenská televízia) and Krátký film Praha Dude on the Road starring Peter Kočiš. His work includes full feature films, TV plays, TV series, documentaries, educational movies and cartoons.

Since the nineties, Makara's work has focused on human rights and anti-drug multi-media campaigns. His project "Toleration" (1995–1996) was dedicated to the Pope John Paul II and was screened on Slovak Television during his first visit in post-communist Slovakia.

He was one of the first Slovak artists to be invited to work with MTV. This was the start of a charitable anti-drug campaign. (1997–2008), supported by the Ministry of Education of Slovak Republic and funded by the Slovak Antidrug Fund. The campaign informed children and young adults about the danger of drugs via 13 antidrug spots "Stop to drugs - Just say no!"

In 2004, Makara initiated the project Gypsies Come To Town which was meant to be one of the first soap operas about Romani and aimed to challenge widespread prejudices that see Romani either as thieves or a welfare burden.

His father, Štefan Makara was a painter, journalist and script editor for Slovak Television (Slovenská televízia). His sister Saša Makarová is a painter living in Vienna, Austria.
