= Makara River (Chatham Islands) =

River in New Zealand

Coordinates: 43.989562°S 176.457697°W

Location
- Country: New Zealand

Physical characteristics
- Mouth
  - location: Te Awainanga River

The Makara River is a river in the Chatham Islands of New Zealand. Located in the southeast of Chatham Island, it runs northeast to become a tributary of the Te Awainanga River, which flows into Te Whanga Lagoon.
