= Double summit =

Mountain or hill with two summits separated by a col

A double summit, double peak, twin summit, or twin peak is a mountain or hill that has two summits, separated by a col or saddle.

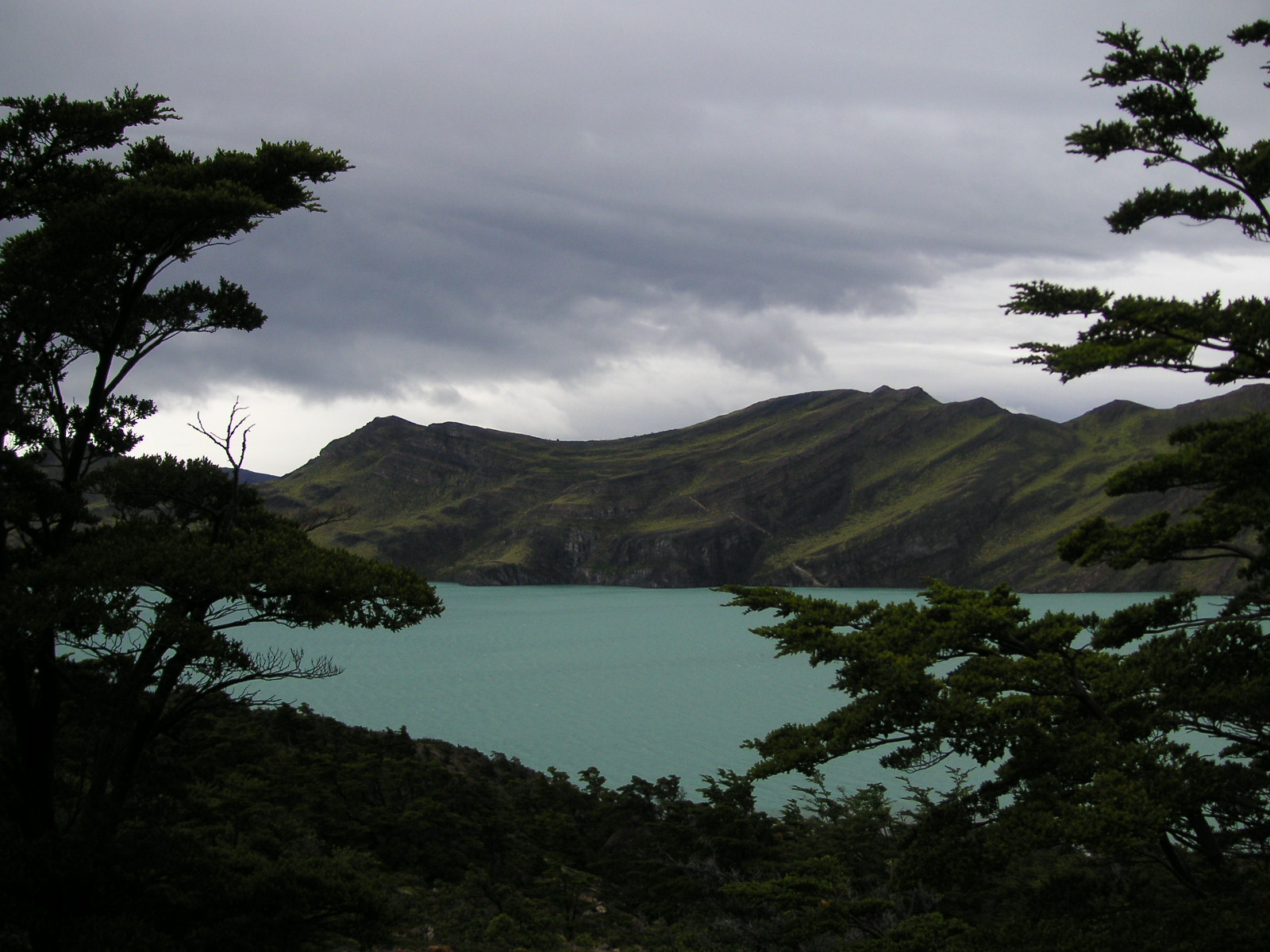
A syncline forms this double summit in Patagonia

One well-known double summit is Austria's highest mountain, the Großglockner, where the main summit of the Großglockner is separated from that of the Kleinglockner by the Glocknerscharte col in the area of a geological fault. Other double summits have resulted from geological folding. For example, on Mont Withrow in British Columbia, resistant sandstones form the limbs of the double summit, whilst the softer rock in the core of the fold was eroded.

Triple peaks occur more rarely; one example is the Rosengartenspitze in the Dolomites. The Illimani in Bolivia is an example of a rare quadruple summit.

== Well known double summits (selection) ==
Well known double summits are (roughly from east to west):

=== Europe ===
==== Limestone Alps ====
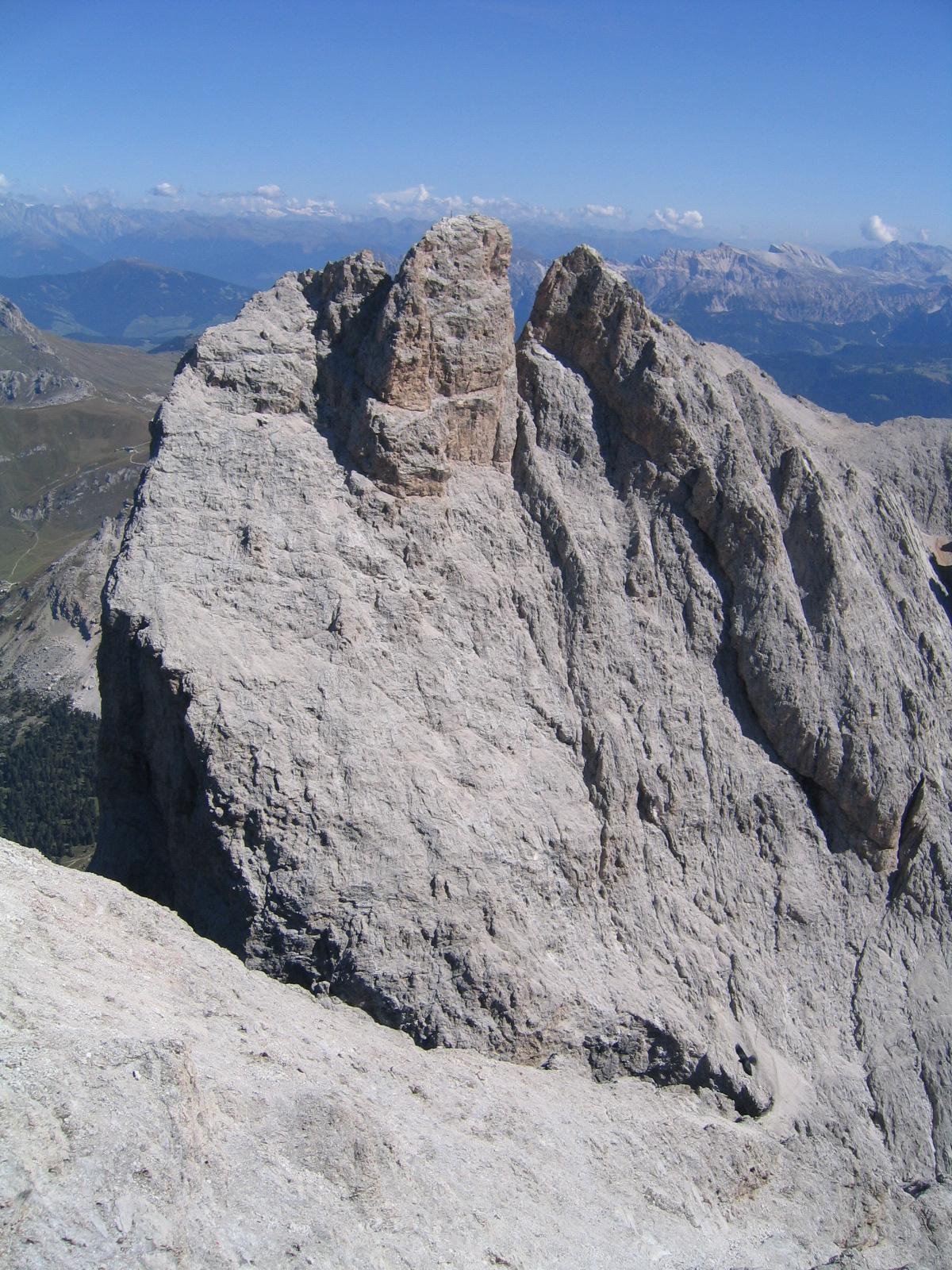
The Furchetta in the Dolomites

- Schneeberg (Lower Austria)
- Kaiserstein in the massif of the Wetterin, Styria
- Lugauer in the Gesäuse, Styria
- Krippenstein (north of the Dachstein Group)
- Bischofsmütze in the Dachstein region (Gosaukamm)
- Brietkogel and the Eiskogel in the Tennen Mountains, Salzburg state
- Karlspitzen in the Kaiser Mountains
- Roßstein and Buchstein, Upper Bavaria
- Klammspitze in the Ammergau Alps
- Guffert in the Rofan, Tyrol
- Grauspitz, Liechtenstein
- Furchetta in the Geisler Group (?)
- Altmann in the Alpstein, East Switzerland
- Vorab in the Glarus Alps, Switzerland

==== Central Alps ====
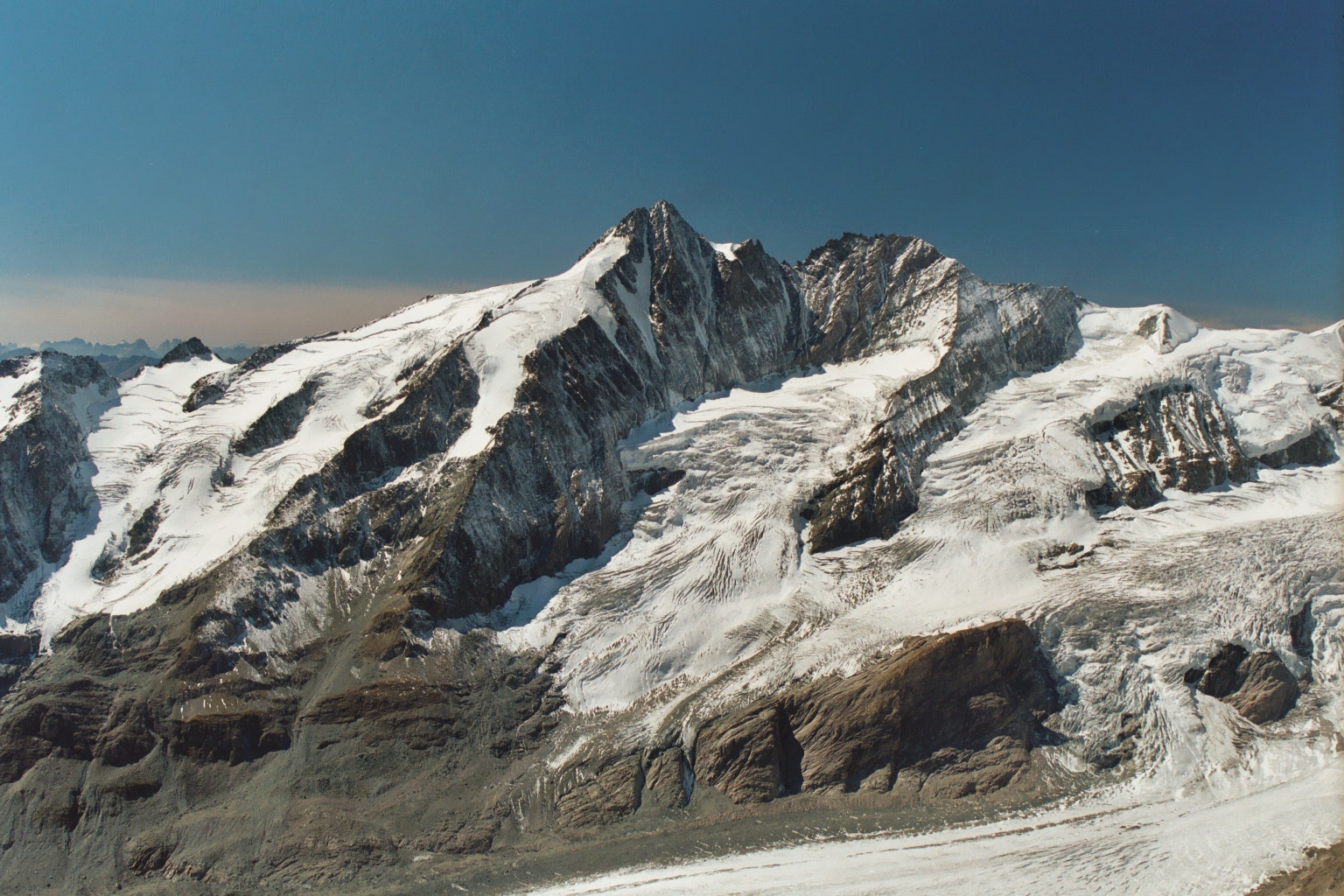
The Großglockner with the twin summits of the Kleinglockner (l) and Großglockner (r)

- Großglockner
- Seekarspitze (Schladming Tauern)
- Gleichenberge (Styria)
- Lasörling in the Großvenediger, High Tauern
- Unterberghorn in eastern North Tyrol
- Wilde Kreuzspitze in the Zillertal Alps
- Rofelewand in the Ötztal Alps
- Watzespitze in the Kaunergrat, Ötztal Alps
- Wildspitze in the Weißkamm, Ötztal Alps
- Schwarzhorn and Weißhorn in South Tyrol
- Ortstock, Glarus Alps
- Aiguille du Dru in the Mont Blanc massif
- Aiguille Verte in the Mont Blanc region

==== Other mountain ranges of Europe ====
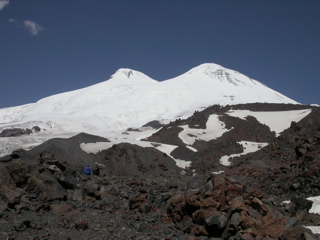
The twin-peaked Elbrus in the Caucasus

- Smolikas (Bogdani and Kapetan Tsekouras) in Greece
- Bubenik in Upper Lusatia
- Strohmberg in Upper Lusatia
- Špičák (Sattelberg) in the Ore Mountains
- Burgstadtl in the Duppau Mountains
- Schanzberge near Tischberg, South Bohemia
- Schwarze Mauer and Kamenec on the Upper Austrian-Bohemian border
- Großer Auerberg in the Harz
- Ehrenbürg, a Zeugenberg in Franconian Switzerland
- Hohenstoffeln (volcano in the Hegau)
- Berguedà in the Pyrenees
- Pen y Fan in the Brecon Beacons

=== Asia ===
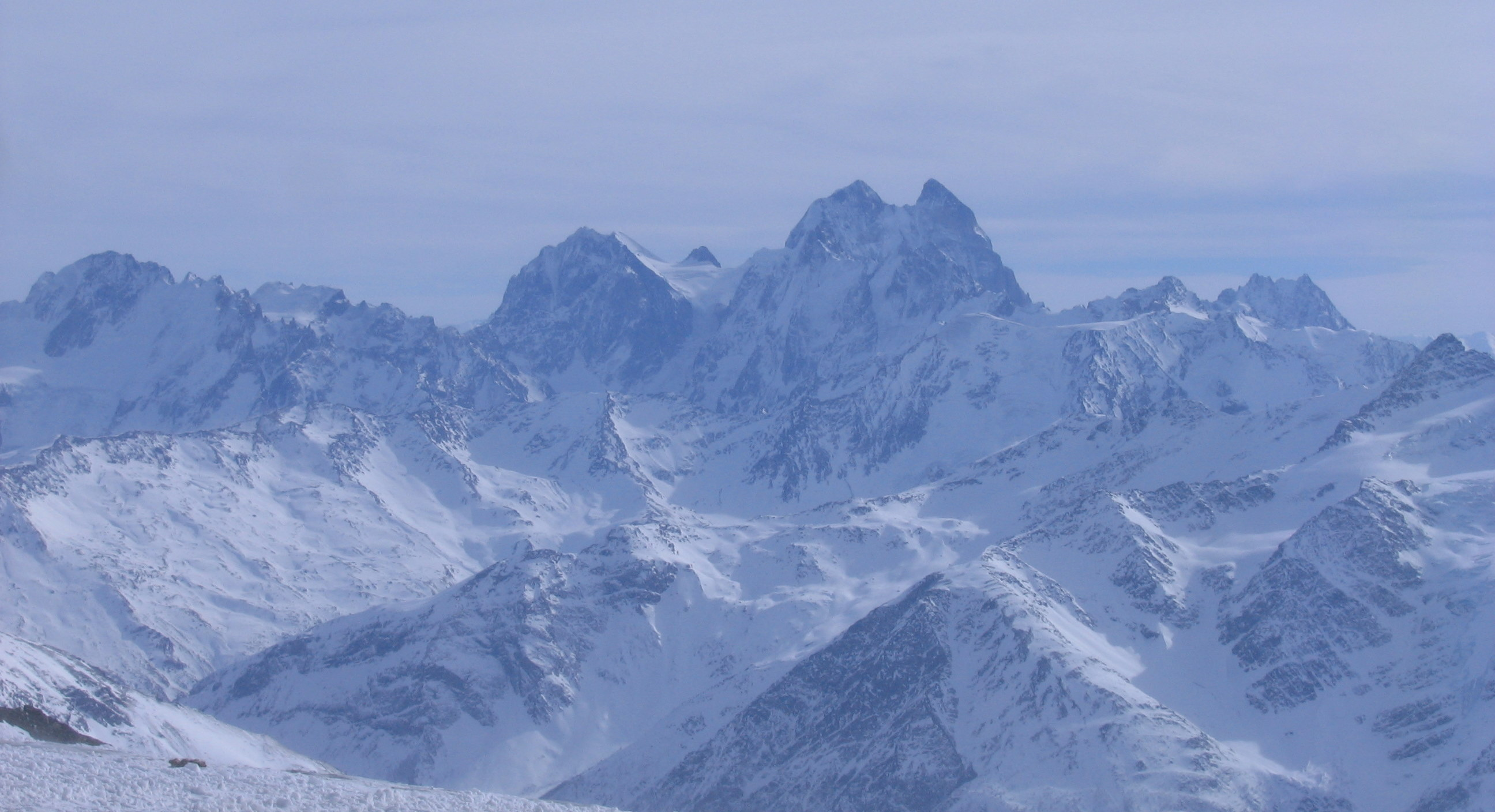
Ushba in the Caucasus

- Hasan Dağı in the region of Cappadocia, Turkey
- Ushba in Georgia
- Elbrus (twin-peaked volcano) in the Caucasus
- Raja Gyepang in Central Lahaul, India
- Machapucharé in the Annapurna massif in the Himalayas, Nepal
- Chogolisa in the Karakorum, Pakistan
- Broad Peak with pre- and main summit in the Karakorum, China/Pakistan
- Gasherbrum IV, southern neighbour of Broad Peak in the Karakorum, Pakistan

=== Other mountain regions ===
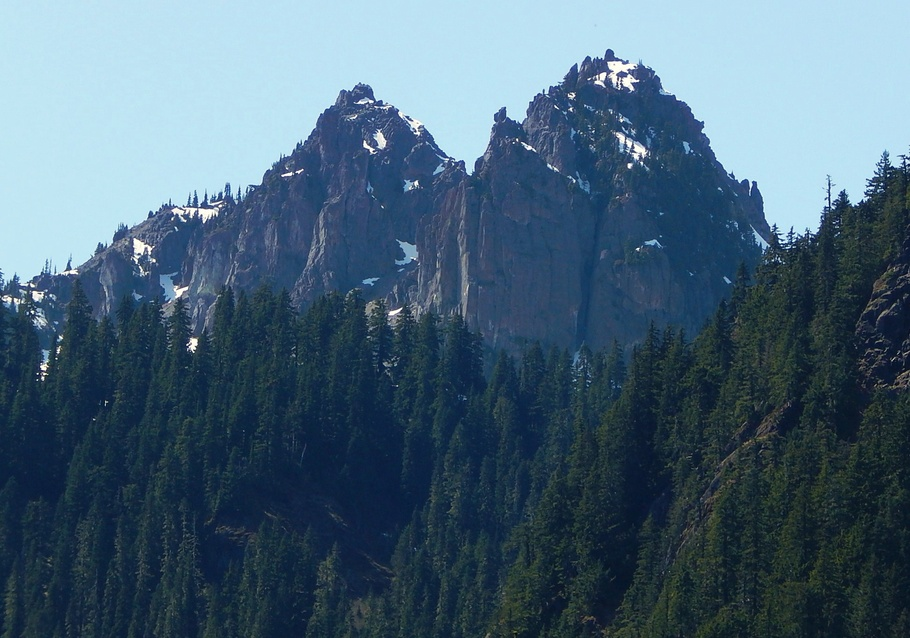
Double Peak in Washington (USA)

- Mont Ross on the Kerguelen Islands
- Pico Duarte on Hispaniola (Dominican Republic)
- Chaupi Orco in the Andes
- Ancohuma in the Andes
- The Brothers in the Olympic Mountains (USA/Washington)
- Double Peak in the Cascade Mountains (USA/Washington)
- Mount Sopris in the Rocky Mountains (USA/Colorado)
- Pilot peak and index peak in Wyoming
- Kaufmann Peaks in Banff National Park Canada
- Popocatépetl and Iztaccíhuatl in the Trans-Mexican Volcanic Belt in Mexico
