= Unterberg =

Unterberg may refer to:

== Places ==
=== Germany ===
- a village in the municipality of Ampfing, Bavaria, Mühldorf am Inn District
- a village in the municipality of Anger, Upper Bavaria
- a village in the municipality of Kirchdorf an der Amper, Bavaria, Freising District
- a village in the municipality of Leichlingen, North Rhine-Westphalia, Solingen District
- a village in the municipality of Schaufling, Bavaria, Deggendorf District
- a village in the municipality of Wermelskirchen, North Rhine-Westphalia, Rheinisch-Bergischer Kreis
- a village in the municipality of Küps, Bavaria, Kronach District
- a village in the municipality of Birstein in Hesse, Main-Kinzig-Kreis
- a village in the municipality of Pfaffenhofen an der Roth, Baden-Württemberg, Neu-Ulm District
- a village in the municipality of Berg, Baden-Württemberg, Ravensburg District
- a village in the municipality of Beckum, North Rhine-Westphalia, name of a farmstead there

=== Austria ===
- Unterberg (Steindorf), village in the municipality of Bodensdorf, Steindorf am Ossiacher See, Carinthia
- Unterberg (Bodensdorf), village in the municipality of Oberglan, Feldkirchen in Carinthia
- Unterberg (Abtenau), near Abtenau, Hallein District, Salzburg
- Unterberg (Dorfgastein), near Dorfgastein, St. Johann i.P. District, Salzburg
- Unterberg (Ebenau), near Ebenau, Hangsiedlung, Salzburg-Umgebung District
- Unterberg (Großarl), near Großarl, St. Johann i.P. District, Salzburg
- Unterberg (Maria Alm), near Maria Alm, Zell am See District, Salzburg
- Unterberg (Niedernsill), near Niedernsill, Zell am See District, Salzburg
- Unterberg (Strobl), near Strobl, Salzburg District
- Unterberg (Brandenberg), near Brandenberg, Kufstein District, Tyrol
- Unterberg (Mutters), near Schönberg im Stubaital, Innsbruck-Land District, Tyrol
- Unterberg (Steinberg), near Steinberg am Rofan, Schwaz District, Tyrol
- Unterberg (Zell am Ziller), near Zell am Ziller, Schwaz District, Tyrol

=== Switzerland ===
- a village in the municipality of Berg SG, Kanton St. Gallen
- a village in the municipality of Fraubrunnen, Kanton Bern
- a village in the municipality of Seelisberg, Kanton Uri

=== Other countries ===
- a place in Kwidzyn (German: Marienwerder), Poland, Voivodship of Pommern

== Mountains and hills ==
- Unterberghorn (Unterberg summit), 1773 m, Kitzbühel District (Tyrol)
- Unterberg (Lower Austria), 1342 m, Lilienfeld District
- Unterberg (Tyrol), 1187 m, Kitzbühel District, Loferer Steinberge

== See also ==
- Underberg (disambiguation)
- Unternberg
- Untersberg, the northernmost massif of the Berchtesgaden Alps
