= Mastaunspitze =

Mountain in Italy

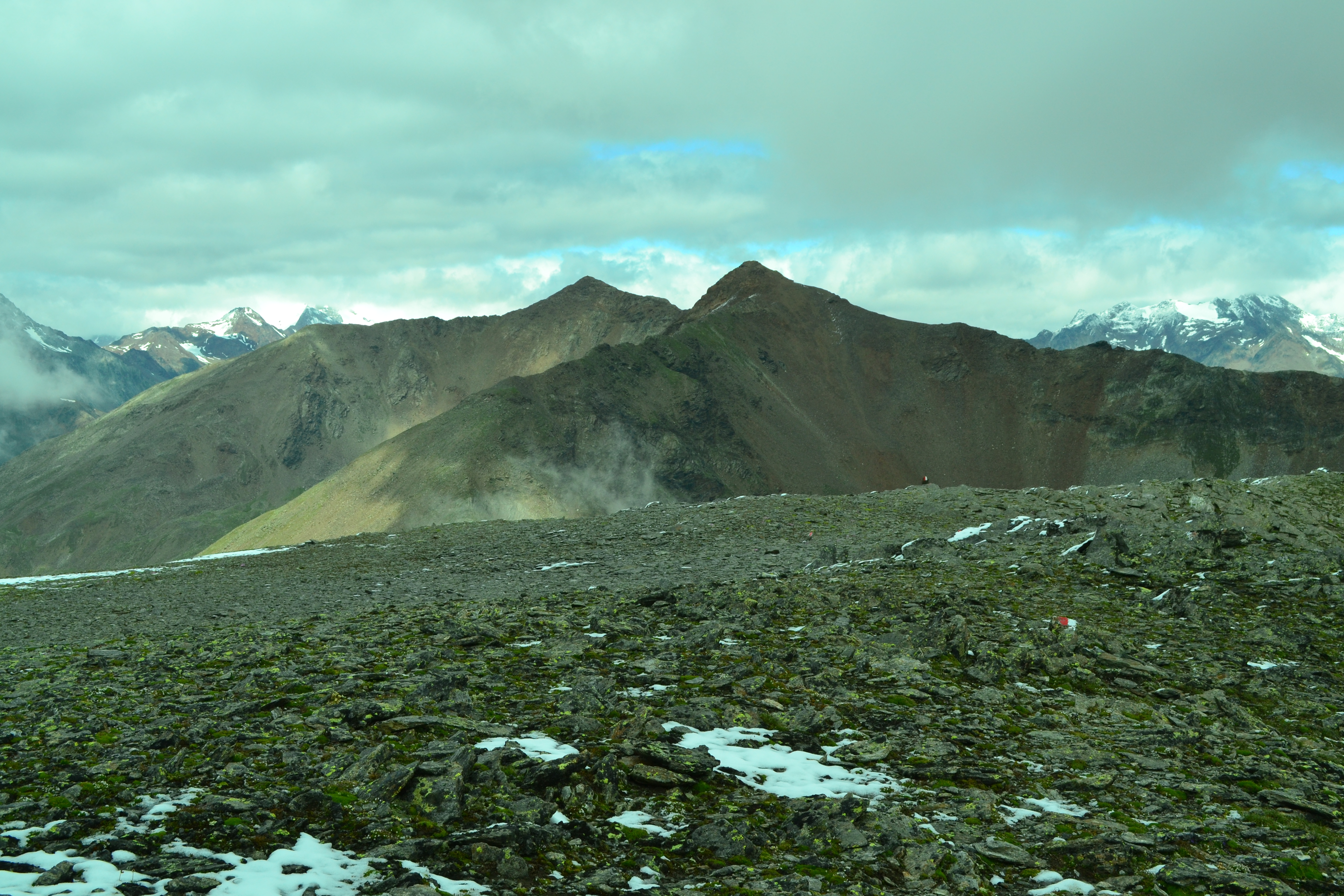
- Mastaunspitze (left) seen from the south

Highest point
- Elevation: 3,200 m (10,500 ft)
- Prominence: 435 m (1,427 ft)
- Parent peak: Saldurspitze (Lagaunspitze)
- Listing: Alpine mountains above 3000 m
- Coordinates: 46°41′37″N 10°48′09″E

Geography
- Location within Italy
- Location: South Tyrol, Italy
- Parent range: Ötztal Alps

Climbing
- First ascent: 1854 for a geological survey

The Mastaunspitze (Italian: Punta di Mastàun) is a mountain in the Saldurkamm group of the Ötztal Alps.
