= Weisshorn (disambiguation) =

The Weisshorn (from German: white peak) is a mountain located in the Pennine Alps.

Weisshorn is also the name of several other mountains:

== Switzerland ==
- Weisshorn (Bernese Alps), in the Bernese Alps
- Aroser Weisshorn, in the Plessur Alps
- Flüela Wisshorn, in the Silvretta Alps

== Italy (South Tyrol) ==
- Weißhorn (South Tyrol), in the Südtiroler Unterland
- Penser Weißhorn, in the Sarntal Alps

== Japan ==
- Weisshorn(ワイスホルン), in the Niseko Volcanic Group

== Exonyms ==
- Weisshorn is also the former German name for the village of Săsarm (Hungarian: Szészárma), part of the commune Chiuza in Bistrița-Năsăud County, Transylvania, Romania
