= Rankoshi Rice =

Japanese local rice

Rankoshi rice
- Alternative names: らんこし米
- Type: Rice
- Place of origin: Japan
- Region or state: Rankoshi, Hokkaido
- Main ingredients: Japonica rice

Rankoshi rice (らんこし米, Rankoshi-mai) is a branded local rice produced in Rankoshi in Hokkaido, Japan. It is one of the town's best-known local specialities and is associated with the fertile basin of the Shiribetsu River and the rice-growing districts of the Rankoshi area.

== History ==
Experimental paddy cultivation in what is now the town began in 1885, when Ishimoto Tahē started a trial rice field in Higashi-Doba of Shiribetsu village. The following year, settlers including Okeya Eita entered Nimbetsu (now Kyoei) and began cultivation there, forming part of the early history of rice growing in the area that later became identified with Rankoshi rice.

== Production and characteristics ==
Rankoshi lies in a basin surrounded by the Niseko mountain range, with paddy land spread across the Shiribetsu River basin. Official local and Hokkaido sources describe the area's fertile soils, mineral-rich water, and relatively large summer day–night temperature differences as favourable for rice cultivation.

Rankoshi rice is locally promoted as a low-protein rice. Under the town's rules for use of the Rankoshi rice label, rice sold under that name must be 100% Rankoshi-produced polished rice, graded as first-class rice in official inspection, with a polished-rice protein content of 6.8% or less. Local promotional material also states that growers deliberately suppress nitrogen fertiliser and use careful field management in order to keep protein content low, even at the cost of lower yields.

Varieties sold as Rankoshi rice include Yumepirika and Nanatsuboshi, which are listed among the town's special products and are also promoted through the local tourism and products association.

== Branding and local culture ==
The town government administers a specific approval system for use of the Rankoshi rice name and sticker, limiting it to Rankoshi residents engaged in rice production or rice retailing who meet the published standards. Rankoshi rice is sold through local direct-sales outlets and roadside facilities, including the town's roadside station Rankoshi Furusato no Oka, where locally produced rice and other farm products are marketed.

The rice is also central to local events. The annual Rankoshi New Rice Festival (らんこし新米まつり) is held as a sales and promotional event for the season's new crop, while the Kome-1 Grand Prix in Rankoshi is used by the town and its tourism association to promote high-quality rice and rice producers more broadly.
