= Mount Mekunnai =

Mountain in Hokkaido, Japan

- 目国内岳
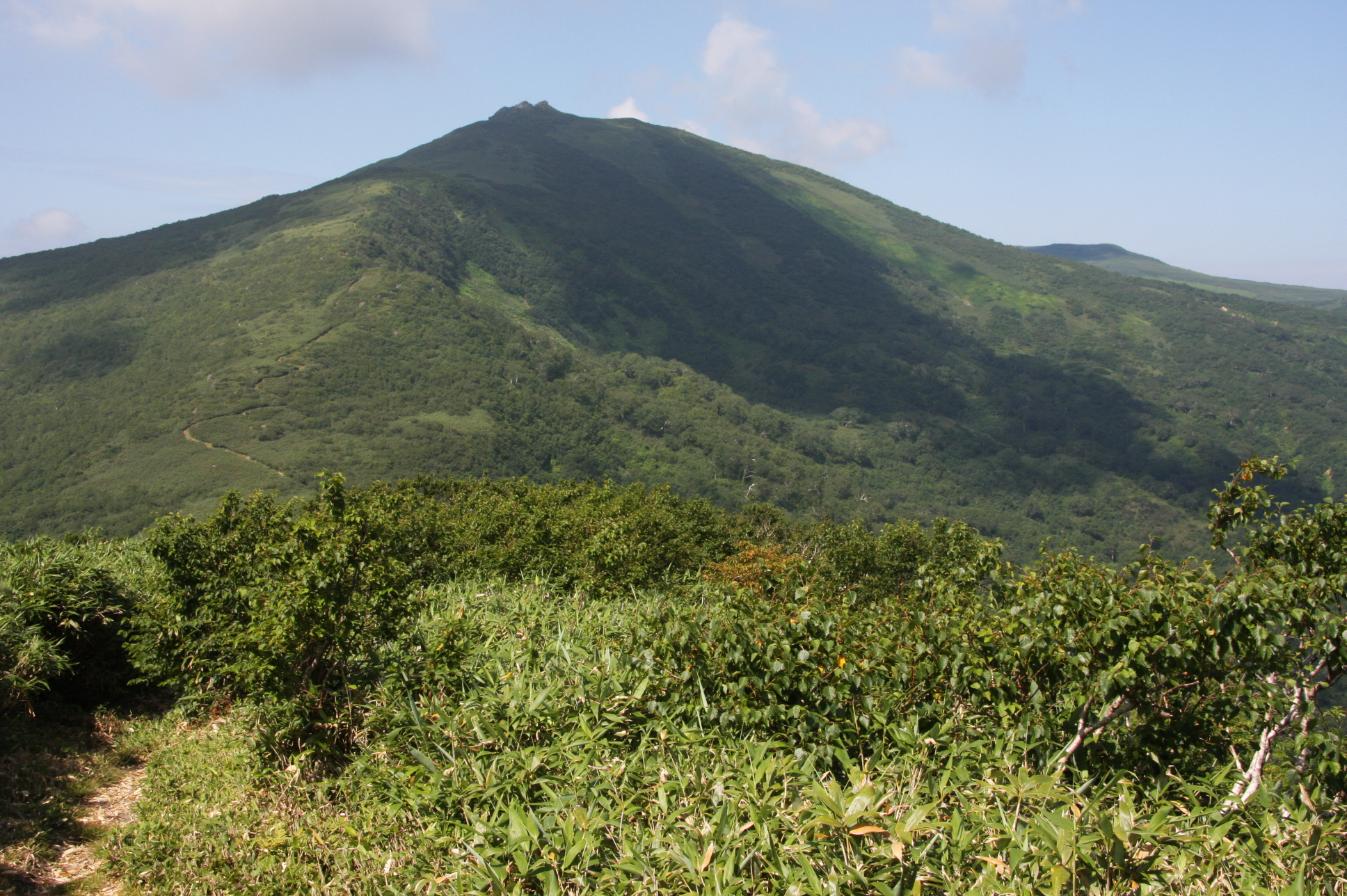
- Mount Mekunnai (Mekunnaidake)

Highest point
- Elevation: 1,220 m (4,000 ft)
- Prominence: 673 m (2,208 ft)
- Parent peak: Niseko Annupuri
- Listing: List of mountains and hills of Japan by height
- Coordinates: 42°54′13″N 140°28′10″E

Geography
- Location: Hokkaido, Japan
- Parent range: Mount Raiden Volcanic Group
- Topo map(s): Geographical Survey Institute 25000:1 チセヌプリ; 50000:1 岩内

Geology
- Rock age: Quaternary
- Mountain type: pyroclastic cone
- Volcanic arc: Northeastern Japan Arc

Mount Mekunnai (目国内岳, Mekunnai-dake) is an andesitic volcano in the Mount Raiden Volcanic Group on the border between Iwanai and Rankoshi, Hokkaido, Japan. Mount Mekunnai is a pyroclastic cone. The mountain consists of primarily non-alkali, mafic, volcanic rock. The rock is younger than that of neighboring Mount Raiden, being categorized at 700,000 to 13,000 years old. The rock is older than that of the Niseko Volcanic Group.

== External link ==
- Geographical Survey Institute
