= Brunnbach =

Brunnbach may refer to:

- Brunnbach (Hagertal), a river of Tyrol, Austria
- Brunnbach (Isar), a river in Munich, Bavaria, Germany
