= Lagaunspitze =

Mountain in Italy

Lagaunspitze/Punta di Lagaun
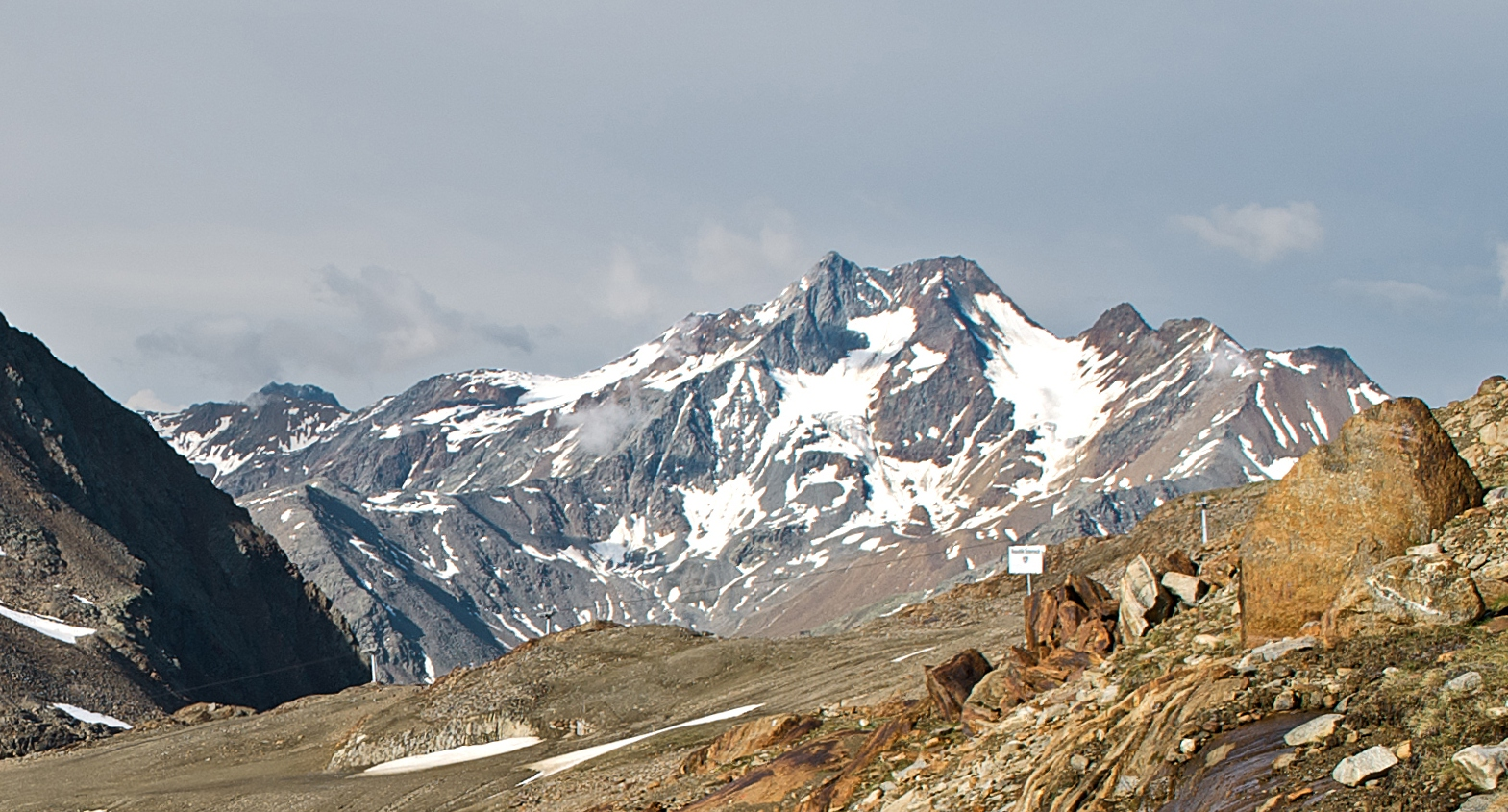
- Saldurkamm with the two peaks Lagaunspitze (left) and Saldurspitze (right)

Highest point
- Elevation: 3,439 m (11,283 ft)
- Prominence: 422 m (1,385 ft)
- Parent peak: Schwemser Spitze
- Listing: Alpine mountains above 3000 m
- Coordinates: 46°44′21″N 10°44′21″E

Geography
- Location within Italy
- Location: South Tyrol, Italy
- Parent range: Ötztal Alps

Climbing
- First ascent: 1853 by Pöltinger, for a geological survey

The Lagaunspitze (Italian: Punta di Lagaun) is a mountain in the Saldurkamm group of the Ötztal Alps. It forms a double peak with the slightly lower Saldurspitze to the northwest.
