= Gsallkopf =

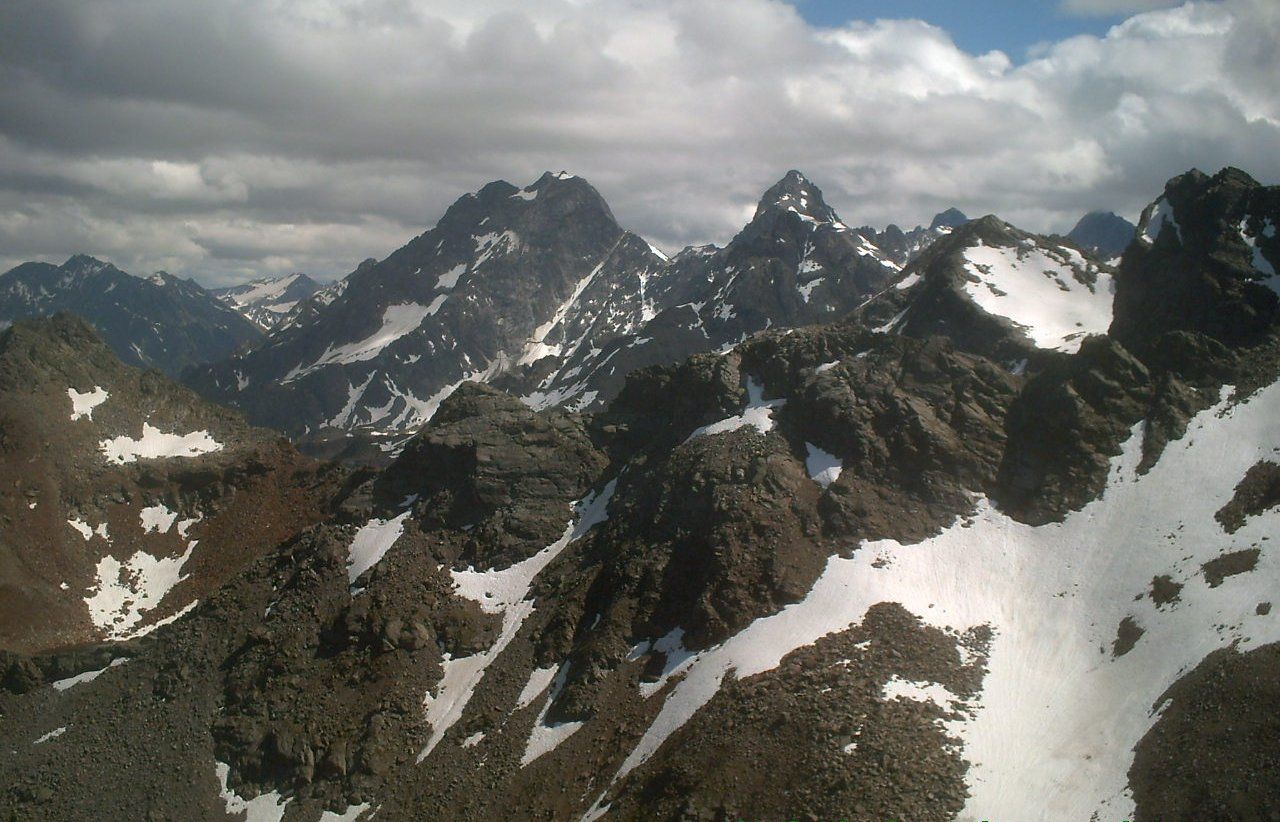
- Rofelewand (middle) and Gsallkopf (right) in the Kaunergrat from near the Fundusfeiler in the Geigenkamm.

Highest point
- Elevation: 3,277 m (10,751 ft)
- Prominence: 300 m (980 ft)
- Parent peak: Rofelewand
- Listing: Alpine mountains above 3000 m
- Coordinates: 47°02′16″N 10°48′18″E

Geography
- Location within Austria
- Location: Tyrol, Austria
- Parent range: Ötztal Alps

Climbing
- First ascent: 1894 by M. Peer and M. Prochaska
- Easiest route: Southface from the Verpeilhütte

The Gsallkopf is a mountain in the Kaunergrat group of the Ötztal Alps.
