= Rankoshi =

Rankoshi 蘭越町
- Town
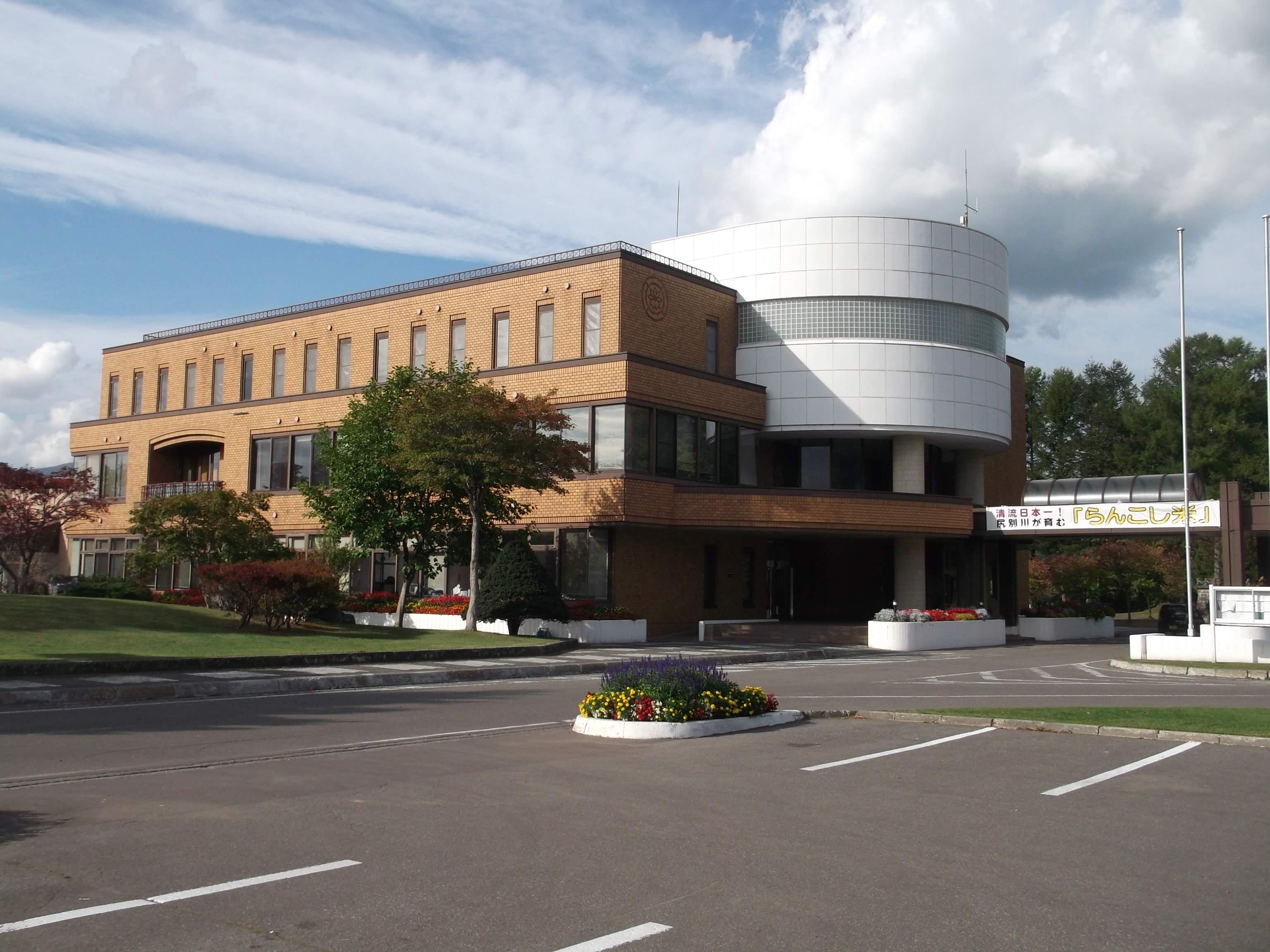
- Rankoshi Town Office

- Flag Seal

- Location of Rankoshi in Hokkaido (Shiribeshi Subprefecture)

- Location in Japan
- Coordinates: 42°49′N 140°32′E
- Country: Japan
- Region: Hokkaido
- Prefecture: Hokkaido (Shiribeshi Subprefecture)
- District: Isoya

Government
  - Mayor: Tomeo Miyauchi

Area
  - Total: 449.68 km^{2} (173.62 sq mi)

Population (September 30, 2016)
  - Total: 4,893
  - Density: 10.88/km^{2} (28.18/sq mi)
- Time zone: UTC+09:00 (JST)
- City hall address: 258-5 Rankoshicho, Rankoshi, Isoya-gun, Hokkaido; 048-1392
- Climate: Dfb
- Website: www.town.rankoshi.hokkaido.jp
- Symbols
- Flower: Magnolia kobus
- Mascot: Love-chan (らぶちゃん)
- Tree: Magnolia kobus

Rankoshi (蘭越町, Rankoshi-chō) is a town located in Shiribeshi Subprefecture, Hokkaido, Japan.

As of September 2016, the town has an estimated population of 4,893, and a density of 11 persons per km^{2}. The total area is 449.68 km^{2}.

== Geography ==
The Shiribetsu River flows through Rankoshi to the Sea of Japan. The town is surrounded by the Niseko Volcanic Group, which belongs to Niseko-Shakotan-Otaru Kaigan Quasi-National Park.

The name is derived from the Ainu word "Ranko-usi", meaning "place with many Katsura trees".

- Mountains: Mount Raiden, Mount Mekunnai, Mount Chisenupuri, Mount Nitonupuri

=== Neighboring towns ===
- Iburi Subprefecture
  - Toyoura
- Shiribeshi Subprefecture
  - Iwanai
  - Kuromatsunai
  - Kutchan
  - Niseko
  - Suttsu

=== Climate ===
Climate data for Rankoshi (1991−2020 normals, extremes 1977−present)
Month	Jan	Feb	Mar	Apr	May	Jun	Jul	Aug	Sep	Oct	Nov	Dec	Year
Record high °C (°F)	8.7 (47.7)	9.7 (49.5)	15.0 (59.0)	25.2 (77.4)	33.1 (91.6)	32.7 (90.9)	33.7 (92.7)	35.4 (95.7)	32.1 (89.8)	25.9 (78.6)	20.7 (69.3)	13.6 (56.5)	35.4 (95.7)
Mean daily maximum °C (°F)	−0.8 (30.6)	0.0 (32.0)	3.9 (39.0)	10.6 (51.1)	17.3 (63.1)	21.3 (70.3)	24.7 (76.5)	25.9 (78.6)	22.4 (72.3)	15.8 (60.4)	7.9 (46.2)	1.2 (34.2)	12.5 (54.5)
Daily mean °C (°F)	−4.2 (24.4)	−3.7 (25.3)	−0.2 (31.6)	5.4 (41.7)	11.4 (52.5)	15.9 (60.6)	19.9 (67.8)	20.9 (69.6)	16.8 (62.2)	10.1 (50.2)	3.6 (38.5)	−2.1 (28.2)	7.8 (46.1)
Mean daily minimum °C (°F)	−8.2 (17.2)	−8.1 (17.4)	−4.8 (23.4)	0.0 (32.0)	5.7 (42.3)	11.4 (52.5)	16.1 (61.0)	16.8 (62.2)	11.7 (53.1)	4.8 (40.6)	−0.5 (31.1)	−5.6 (21.9)	3.3 (37.9)
Record low °C (°F)	−24.7 (−12.5)	−24.1 (−11.4)	−19.2 (−2.6)	−10.5 (13.1)	−2.6 (27.3)	2.0 (35.6)	5.5 (41.9)	7.5 (45.5)	1.3 (34.3)	−3.9 (25.0)	−11.9 (10.6)	−20.3 (−4.5)	−24.7 (−12.5)
Average precipitation mm (inches)	104.2 (4.10)	79.6 (3.13)	59.2 (2.33)	61.0 (2.40)	74.1 (2.92)	64.1 (2.52)	104.2 (4.10)	142.2 (5.60)	142.9 (5.63)	120.9 (4.76)	137.2 (5.40)	125.9 (4.96)	1,220.4 (48.05)
Average snowfall cm (inches)	213 (84)	169 (67)	107 (42)	13 (5.1)	0 (0)	0 (0)	0 (0)	0 (0)	0 (0)	0 (0)	53 (21)	194 (76)	746 (294)
Average precipitation days (≥ 1.0 mm)	21.2	17.5	13.8	10.3	9.3	8.3	8.8	9.7	11.7	14.3	18.3	21.8	165
Average snowy days (≥ 3 cm)	21.0	18.1	13.7	2.0	0	0	0	0	0	0	5.8	19.4	80
Mean monthly sunshine hours	33.3	48.2	99.5	164.9	196.4	160.6	131.4	142.9	148.7	122.7	63.2	26.4	1,338
Source: Japan Meteorological Agency

== History ==
- 1909: Minamishiribeshi became a Second Class Village.
- 1940: Minamishiribeshi became a First Class Village.
- 1954: Minamishiribeshi Village became Rankoshi Town.
- 1955: A part of Suttsu Town was merged into Rankoshi Town.

== Education ==
- High school
  - Hokkaido Rankoshi High School
- Junior high school
  - Rankoshi Junior High School
- Elementary schools
  - Kombu Elementary School
  - Rankoshi Elementary School

== Transportation ==
- Hakodate Main Line: Mena - Rankoshi - Konbu
- Route 5

== Sister city ==
- Saalfelden, Salzburg, Austria (since 1967)
