= Rofelewand =

Mountain in Austria

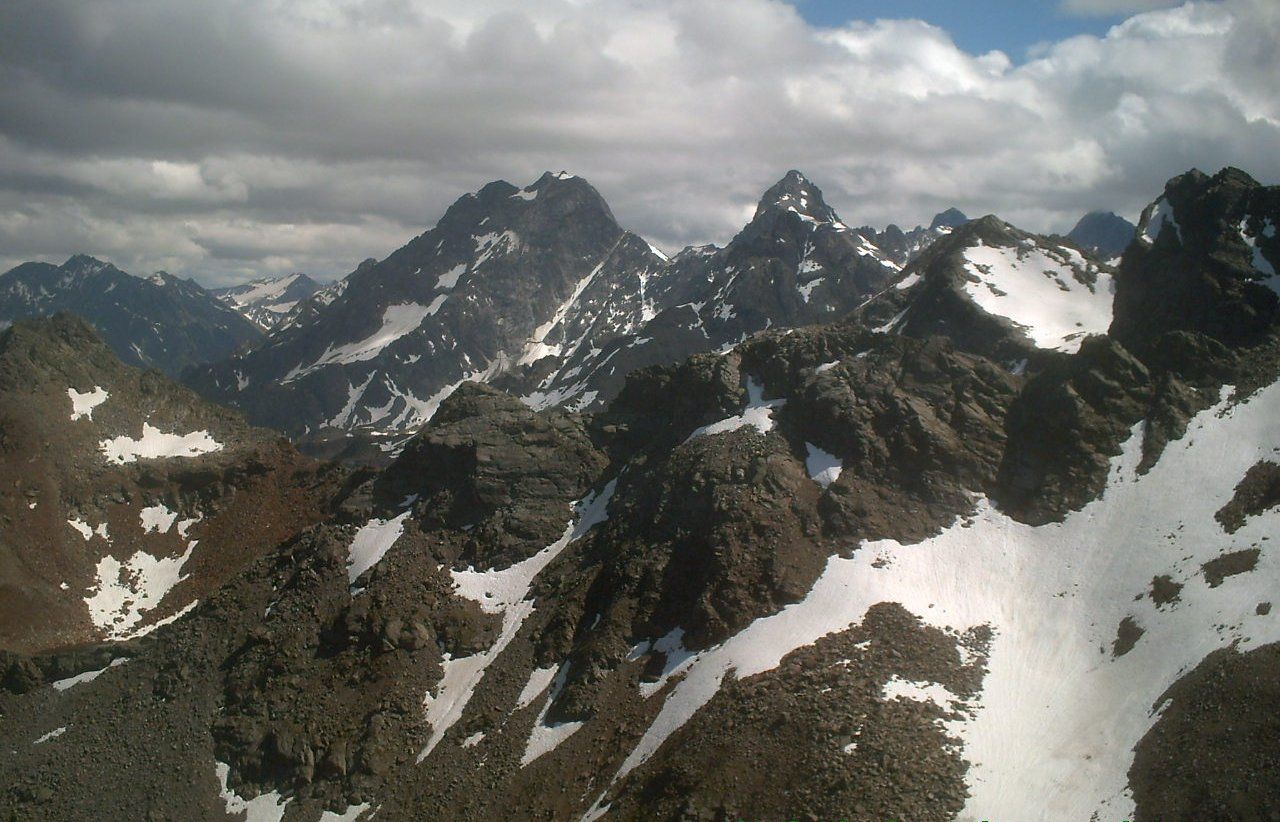
- Rofelewand (middle) and Gsallkopf (right) in the Kaunergrat from near the Fundusfeiler in the Geigenkamm.

Highest point
- Elevation: 3,354 m (11,004 ft)
- Prominence: 529 m (1,736 ft)
- Parent peak: Verpeilspitze (Wildspitze)
- Listing: Alpine mountains above 3000 m
- Coordinates: 47°01′56″N 10°49′06″E

Geography
- Location within Austria
- Location: Tyrol, Austria
- Parent range: Ötztal Alps

Climbing
- First ascent: 24 Jul 1873 by Theodor Petersen, Alois Ennemoser, Josef Kirschner, Gottlieb Rauch, Alois Neururer, K. Neuner, C. Benzien and I. Müller
- Easiest route: North ridge (UIAA-II)

The Rofelewand is a mountain in the Kaunergrat group of the Ötztal Alps.

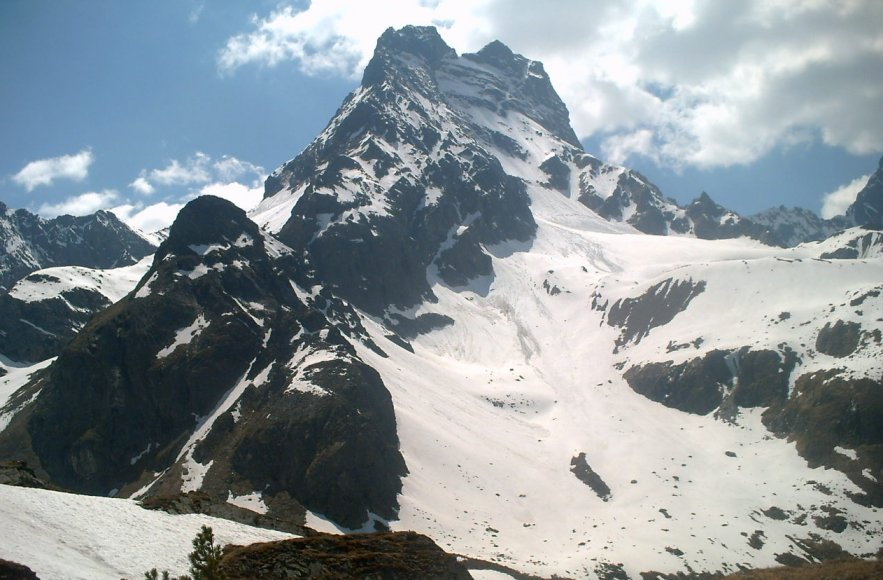
Rofelewand from the Rabenkopf. You can see the east ridge up to the east summit

== See also ==
- List of mountains in Austria
