= Underberg (disambiguation) =

Underberg is a German bitters drink.

Underberg may also refer to:

- Underberg, KwaZulu-Natal, an administrative town in South Africa
- Theresa Underberg (born 1985), German actress and radio play talker

== See also ==
- Unterberg (disambiguation)
