= Brunnbach (Hagertal) =

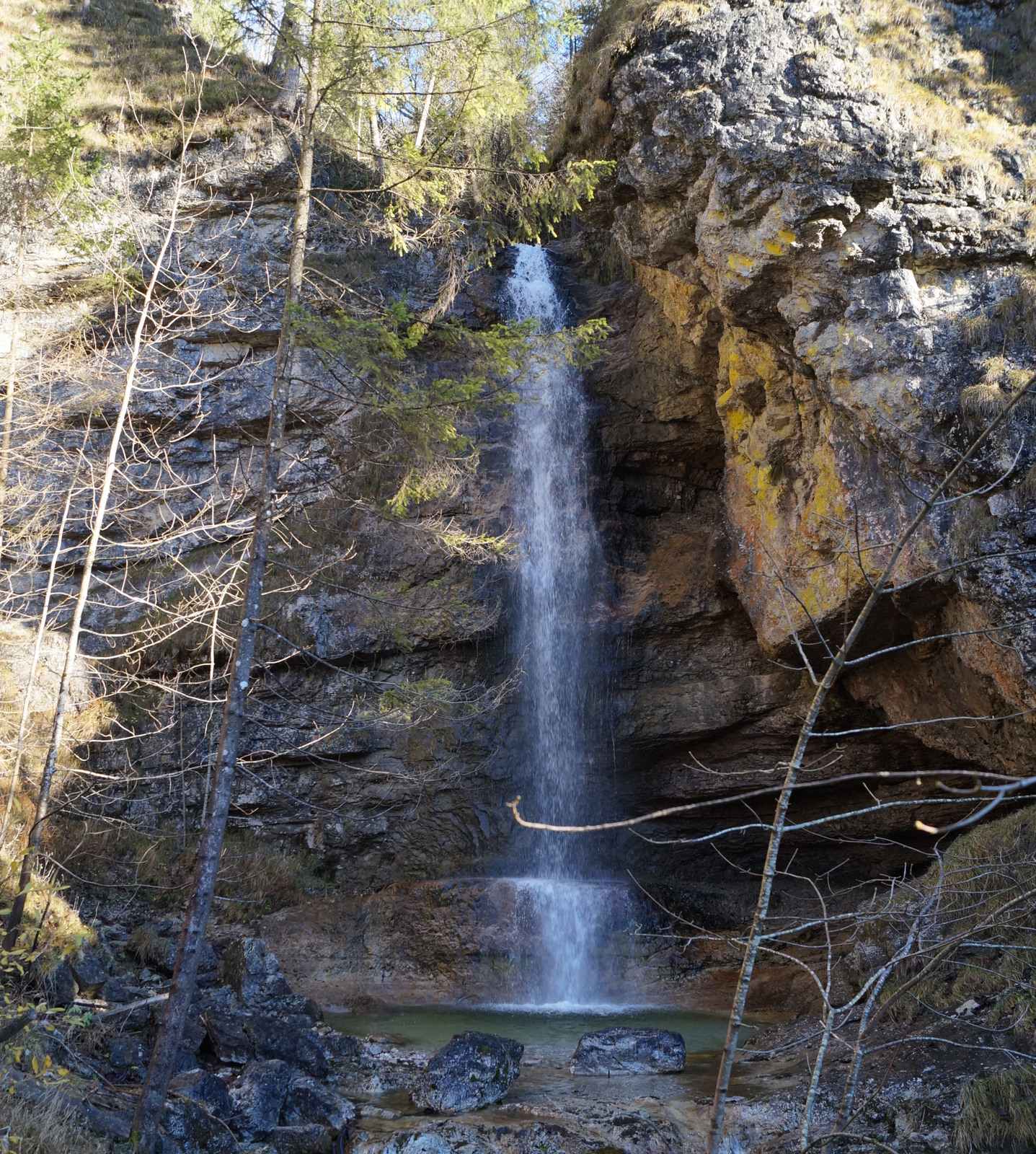
- The Brunnbach waterfall at the Bäckenalm

Location
- Country: Austria
- State: Tyrol

Physical characteristics
- Source
  - location: Fellhorn (Chiemgau Alps)
- Mouth
  - location: Großache in the Hagertal
  - coordinates: 47°38′10″N 12°27′32″E

Basin features
- Progression: Großache→ Alz→ Inn→ Danube→ Black Sea

The Brunnbach is a river of Tyrol, Austria, in the protected landscape Hefferthorn-Fellhorn-Sonnenberg.

== Course ==
The Brunnbach rises at an altitude of 1,610 metres (5,280 ft) above the Adriatic sea level below the Fellhorn mountain in the Chiemgau Alps and flows with a number of waterfalls in the Kreuzangergraben downstream in the valley. The stream is fed by tributaries from the rifts of the Einfangalm, Hackalm, Martenalm and Weissensteinalm. (Alm: German for Alpine pasture). In a last waterfall above the Bäckenalm, the water again rushes down and collects itself in a lagoon-like basin. In the valley Hagertal between Kössen and Kirchdorf in Tirol, after 2 kilometres (1.2 mi) it reaches as right tributary the Großache.

== Special feature ==
The distinctiveness of this river is the naturalness of its meandering course and its natural shore vegetation. The stream has a width between 2 and 6 metres (7 and 20 ft). After strong rainfalls, the body swells rapidly and passes over the shores, but flows through the meanders at low speed. Therefore, here the typical fertile wetlands are formed.
