= Klammspitze =

Coordinates: 47°34′52″N 10°54′32″E

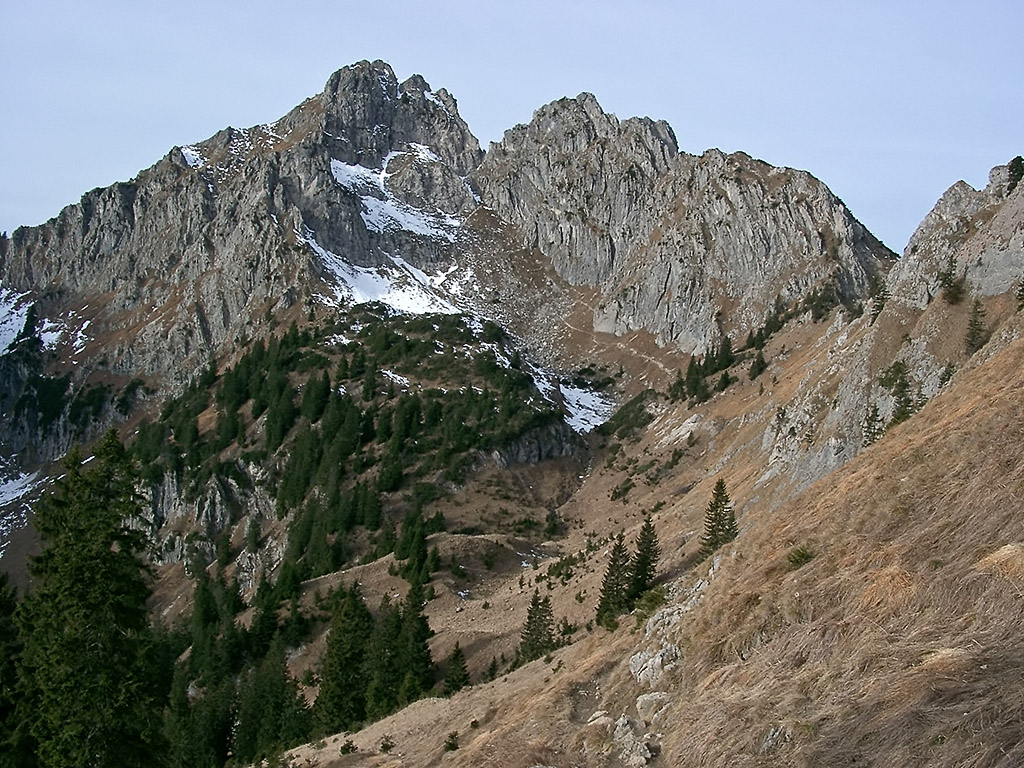
- Klammspitzen

Highest point
- Elevation: 1,924 m (6,312 ft)DE-NHN

Geography
- Location: Bavaria, Germany

The Klammspitze is a double-summit mountain in Bavaria, Germany, located north of Linderhof.

The higher top, Großer Klammspitz is 1,924 metres above sea level. The lower top Kleiner Klammspitz is 1,882 metres high.
