= Saldurspitze =

Mountain in Italy

Saldurspitze/Punta Saldura
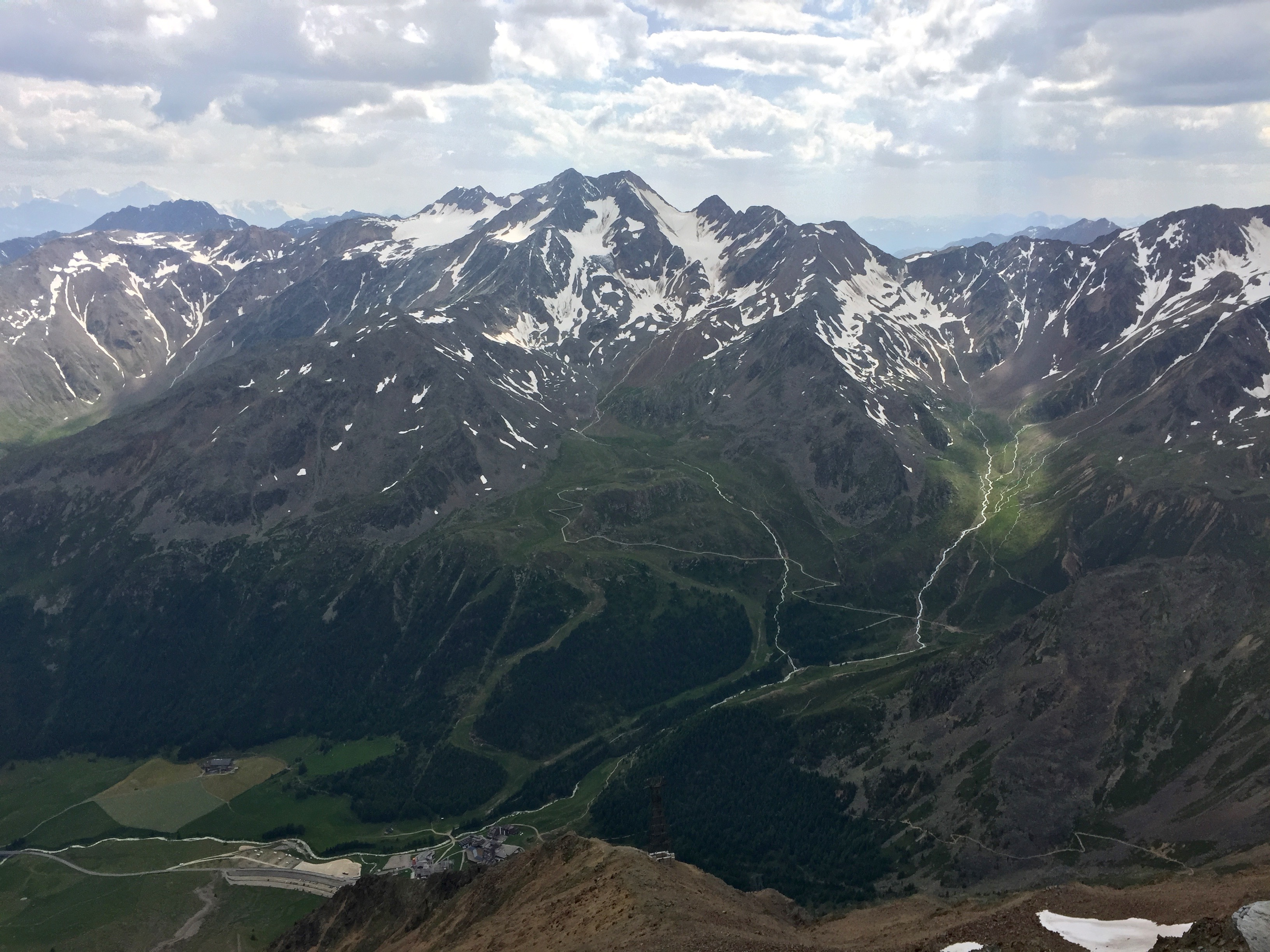
- View of Saldurspitze from east

Highest point
- Elevation: 3,433 m (11,263 ft)
- Prominence: 65 m (213 ft)
- Parent peak: Lagaunspitze
- Coordinates: 46°44′28″N 10°44′06″E

Geography
- Location within Alps
- Location: South Tyrol, Italy
- Parent range: Ötztal Alps

Climbing
- First ascent: 1853 by Pöltinger, for a geological survey
- Easiest route: From Kurzras from the northeast over the north ridge.

The Saldurspitze or Salurnspitze (Italian: Punta Saldura) is a mountain in the Saldurkamm group of the Ötztal Alps. It forms a double peak with the slightly higher Lagaunspitze to the southeast.

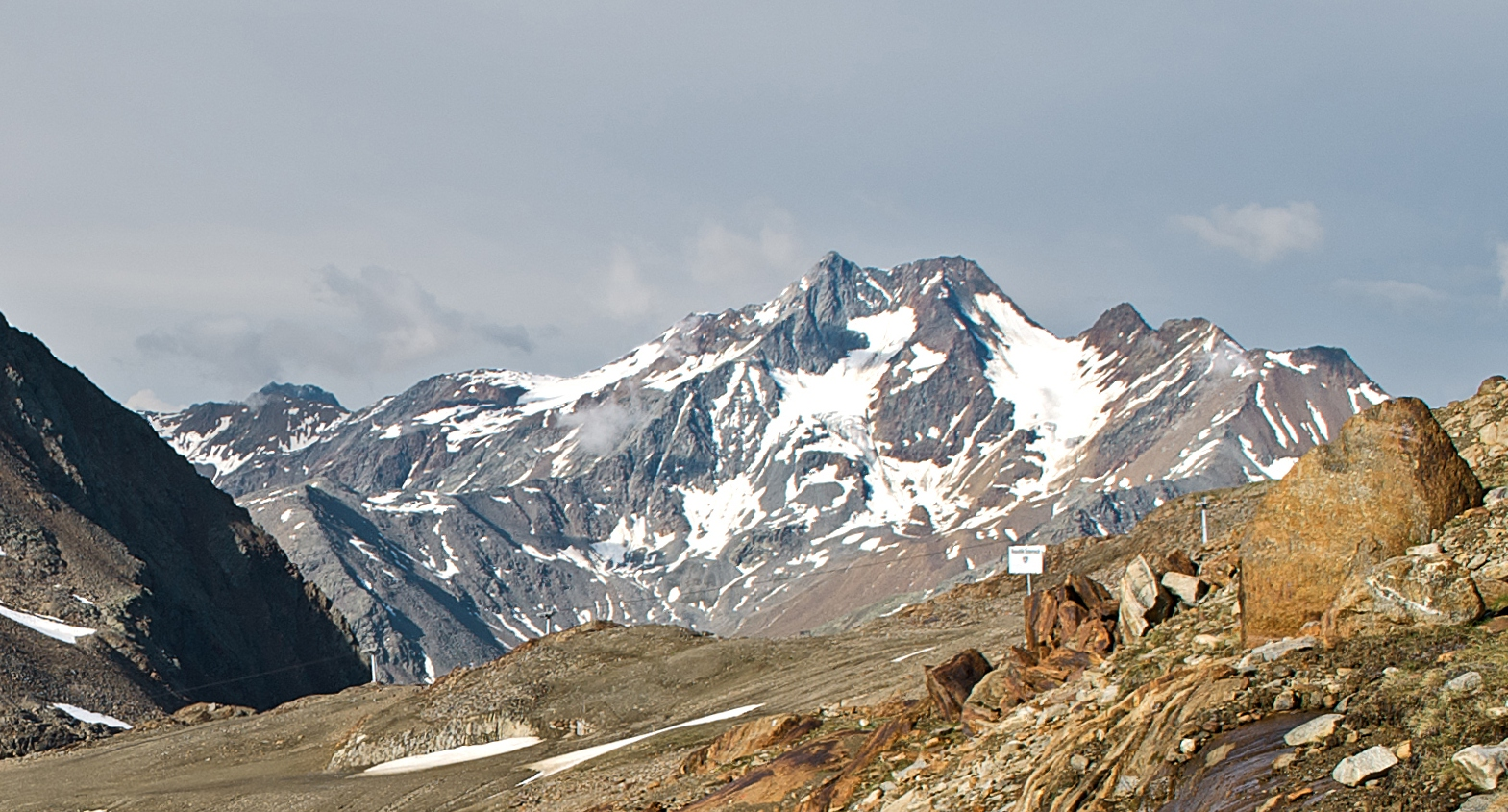
Saldurkamm with the two peaks Lagaunspitze (left) and Saldurspitze (right)
