= Mount Raiden Volcanic Group =

Volcanic group in Hokkaido, Japan

Highest point
- Peak: Mount Mekunnai
- Elevation: 1,220 m (4,000 ft)
- Coordinates: 42°53′59″N 140°30′55″E

Naming
- Native name: 雷電山火山群 (Japanese); Raiden-yama-kazangun (Japanese)

Geography
- Country: Japan
- State: Hokkaidō
- Region: Shiribeshi Subprefecture
- Districts: Isoya District and Iwanai District
- Municipalities: Iwanai, Kyōwa and Rankoshi
- Borders on: Niseko Volcanic Group
- Biome: alpine climate

Geology
- Orogeny: island arc
- Rock age: Quaternary
- Rock type: volcanic

Mount Raiden Volcanic Group is a volcanic group of active stratovolcanoes and lava domes situated in Hokkaidō, Japan. The volcanoes were active 1.4 million to 800,000 years ago.

== List of peaks ==
Name	Height	Type
Mount Mekunnai (目国内岳, Mekunnai-dake)	1,220 metres (4,000 ft)	pyroclastic cone
Mount Raiden (雷電山, Raiden-yama)	1,211.3 metres (3,970 ft)	pyroclastic cone
Mount Iwanai	-	-
Mount Shakunage	-	-
