= Fundusfeiler =

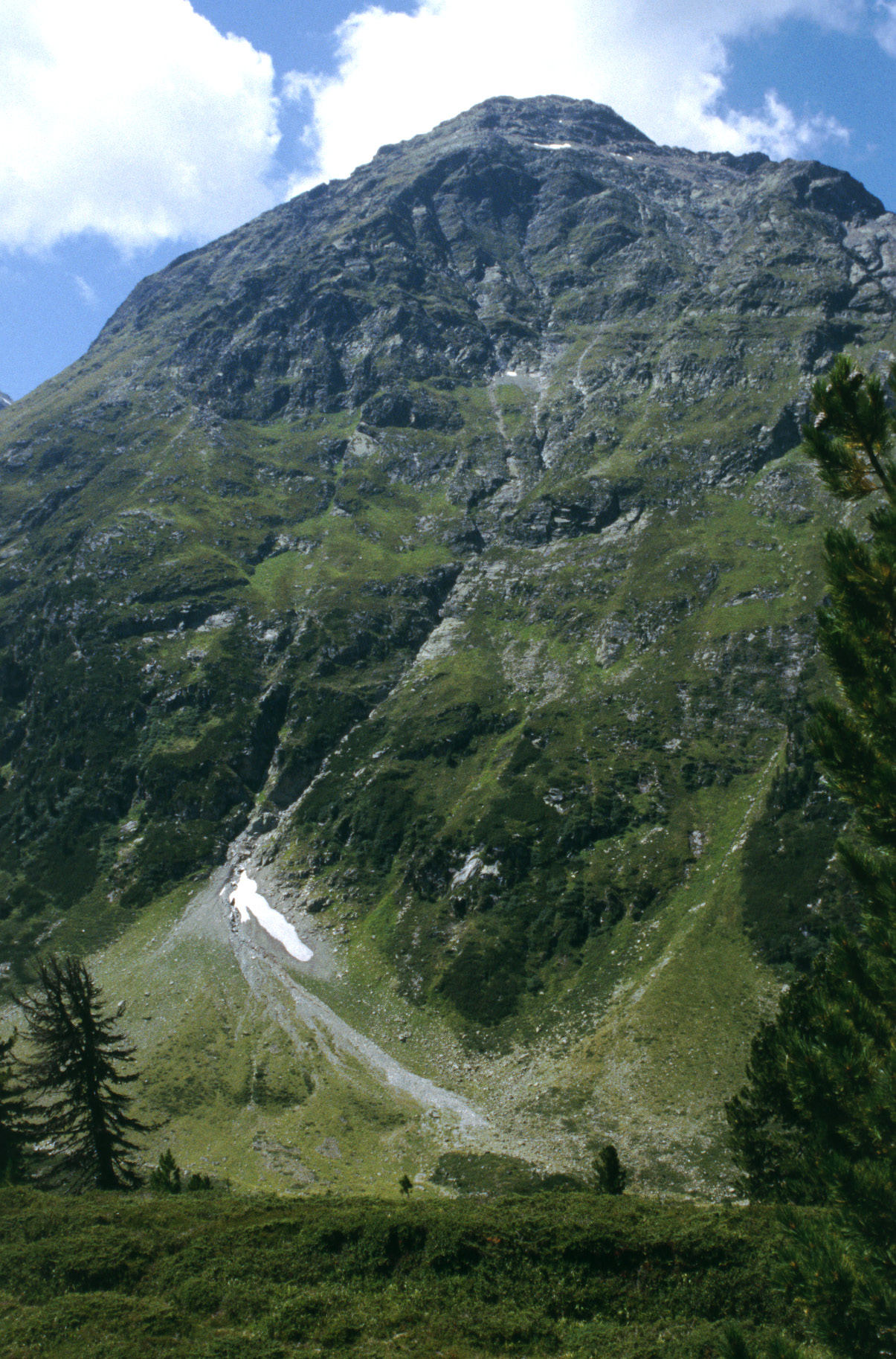
- Fundusfeiler from the east.

Highest point
- Elevation: 3,079 m (10,102 ft)
- Prominence: 295 m (968 ft)
- Parent peak: Blockkogel
- Listing: Alpine mountains above 3000 m
- Coordinates: 47°06′44″N 10°52′13″E

Geography
- Location within Austria
- Location: Tyrol, Austria
- Parent range: Ötztal Alps

Climbing
- Easiest route: Over south ridge

The Fundusfeiler is a mountain in the Geigenkamm group of the Ötztal Alps, rising 3,079 m (10,102 ft) above sea level. In 1991, Ötzi the iceman was found here.

== See also ==
- List of mountains of the Alps
