= Mount Raiden =

Mountain in Hokkaido, Japan

- 雷電山
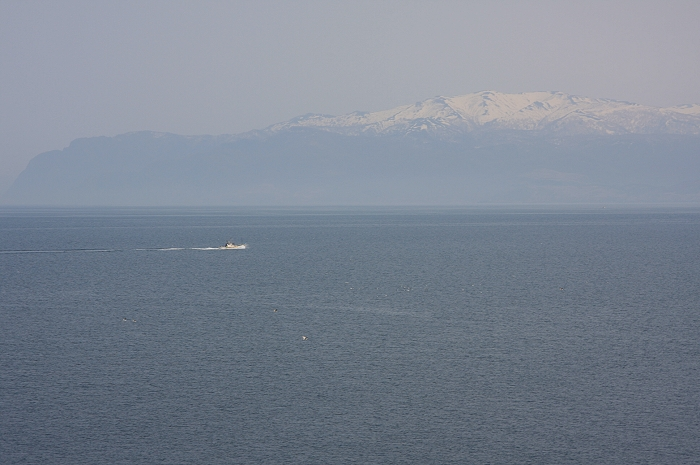
- Mount Raiden.

Highest point
- Elevation: 1,211.3 m (3,974 ft)
- Prominence: 250 m (820 ft)
- Parent peak: Mount Mekunnai
- Listing: List of mountains and hills of Japan by height
- Coordinates: 42°54′13″N 140°28′10″E

Naming
- English translation: Thunder and Lightning Mountain
- Language of name: Japanese

Geography
- Location within Japan
- Location: Hokkaidō, Japan
- Parent range: Mount Raiden Volcanic Group
- Topo map(s): Geographical Survey Institute 25000:1 雷電山; 50000:1 島古丹

Geology
- Rock age: Quaternary
- Mountain type: pyroclastic cone
- Volcanic arc: Northeastern Japan Arc

Mount Raiden (雷電山, Raiden-yama) is an andesitic volcano in the Mount Raiden Volcanic Group on the border between Iwanai and Rankoshi, Hokkaidō, Japan. Mount Raiden is a pyroclastic cone. The mountain consists of primarily non-alkali, mafic, volcanic rock.
