= Blockkogel =

Mountain in the Ötztal Alps in Tyrol

- Location within Austria

Highest point
- Elevation: 3,098 m (10,164 ft)
- Prominence: 303 m (994 ft)
- Parent peak: Luibiskogel
- Listing: Alpine mountains above 3000 m
- Coordinates: 47°05′07″N 10°52′50″E

Geography
- Location: Tyrol, Austria
- Parent range: Ötztal Alps

The Blockkogel is a mountain in the Geigenkamm group of the Ötztal Alps.

== See also ==
- List of mountains of the Alps
