= Schwemser Spitze =

Mountain in Italy

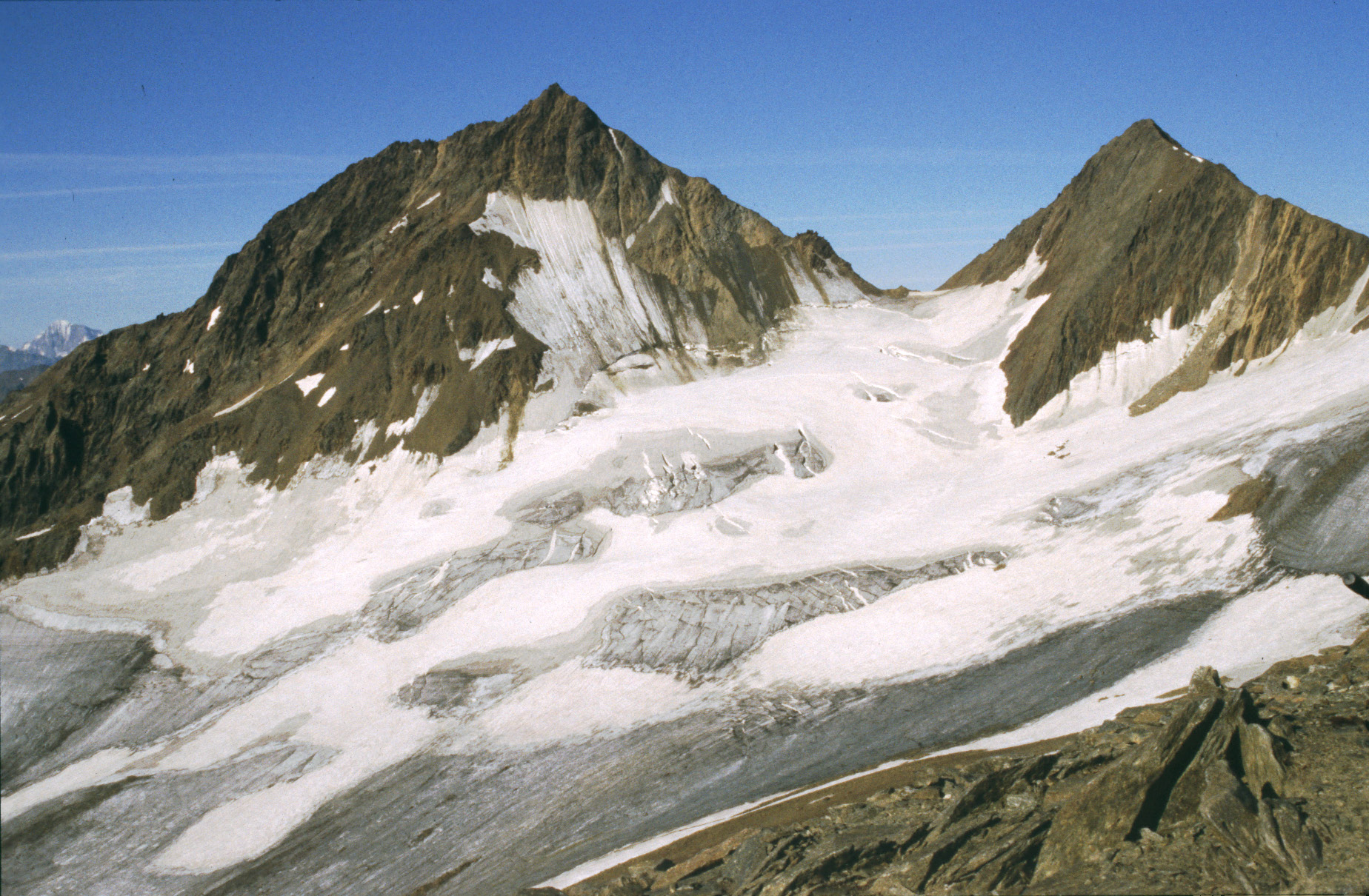
- Schwemser Spitze (left) from the northeast over the Steinschlagferner. To the right is the Äußere Quellspitze (3385 m)

Highest point
- Elevation: 3,459 m (11,348 ft)
- Prominence: 213 m (699 ft)
- Parent peak: Weißkugel
- Coordinates: 46°46′26″N 10°43′58″E

Geography
- Location within Alps
- Location: South Tyrol, Italy
- Parent range: Ötztal Alps

Climbing
- First ascent: 2 Sep 1875 by J. Hoffmann and Josef Spechtenhauser (guide)
- Easiest route: From Kurzras over the Schwemser glacier via the south peak

The Schwemser Spitze or Oberettespitze (Italian: Punta d'Oberettes) is a mountain in the Saldurkamm group of the Ötztal Alps.
