= Strohmberg =

Mountain in Germany

Coordinates: 51°10′38″N 14°39′13″E

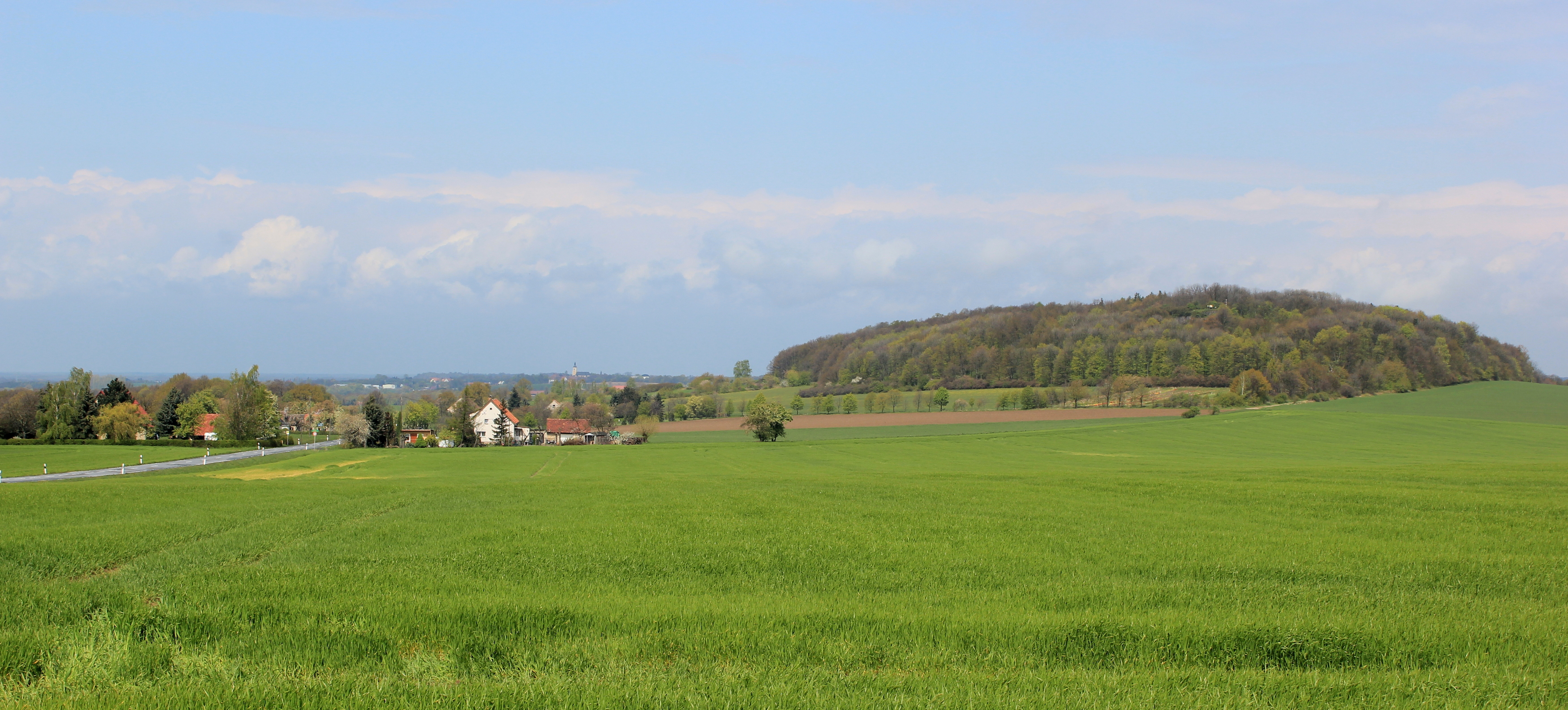
- Strohmberg.

Highest point
- Elevation: 264 m (866 ft)

Geography
- Location: Saxony, Germany

Strohmberg is a mountain of Saxony, southeastern Germany In earlier times there was a Basalt quarry. Strahmberg is 264 metres above sea level and is situated east of Särka/Žarki, close to Kgl.-sächs. Postmeilenstein Särka.
