= Unterberg (Tyrol) =

Mountain in Austria

- Location within Austria

Highest point
- Elevation: 1,187 m (AA) (3,894 ft)
- Coordinates: 47°30′38″N 12°36′14″E

Geography
- Location: on the transition from the Kitzbühel Alps to the Loferer Steinberge
- Parent range: Brixental

The Unterberg is a 1,187 m high, wooded, conical mountain peak above the Pillersee valley, near St. Ulrich am Pillersee and St. Jakob im Haus, Kitzbühel District, in Austria.

It stands out amongst the neighbouring and rather higher peaks (the Tannkogel (1,289 m), Weißleiten (1,400 m) and Grieslegg (1,348 m)) due to its regular shape and stands right on the transition from the gently rolling Kitzbühel Alps to the rugged Loferer Steinberge. The former consist of crystalline slate, hence their rounded shapes, whilst the "stone mountains" (Steinberge) to the east are dominated by limestone rock faces. As a result, the shape and colour contrast between the Unterberg and its surroundings- e. g. in comparison with the neighbouring Grieslegg peak - is all the more striking.
