= Schwarzhorn (South Tyrol) =

Mountain in Italy

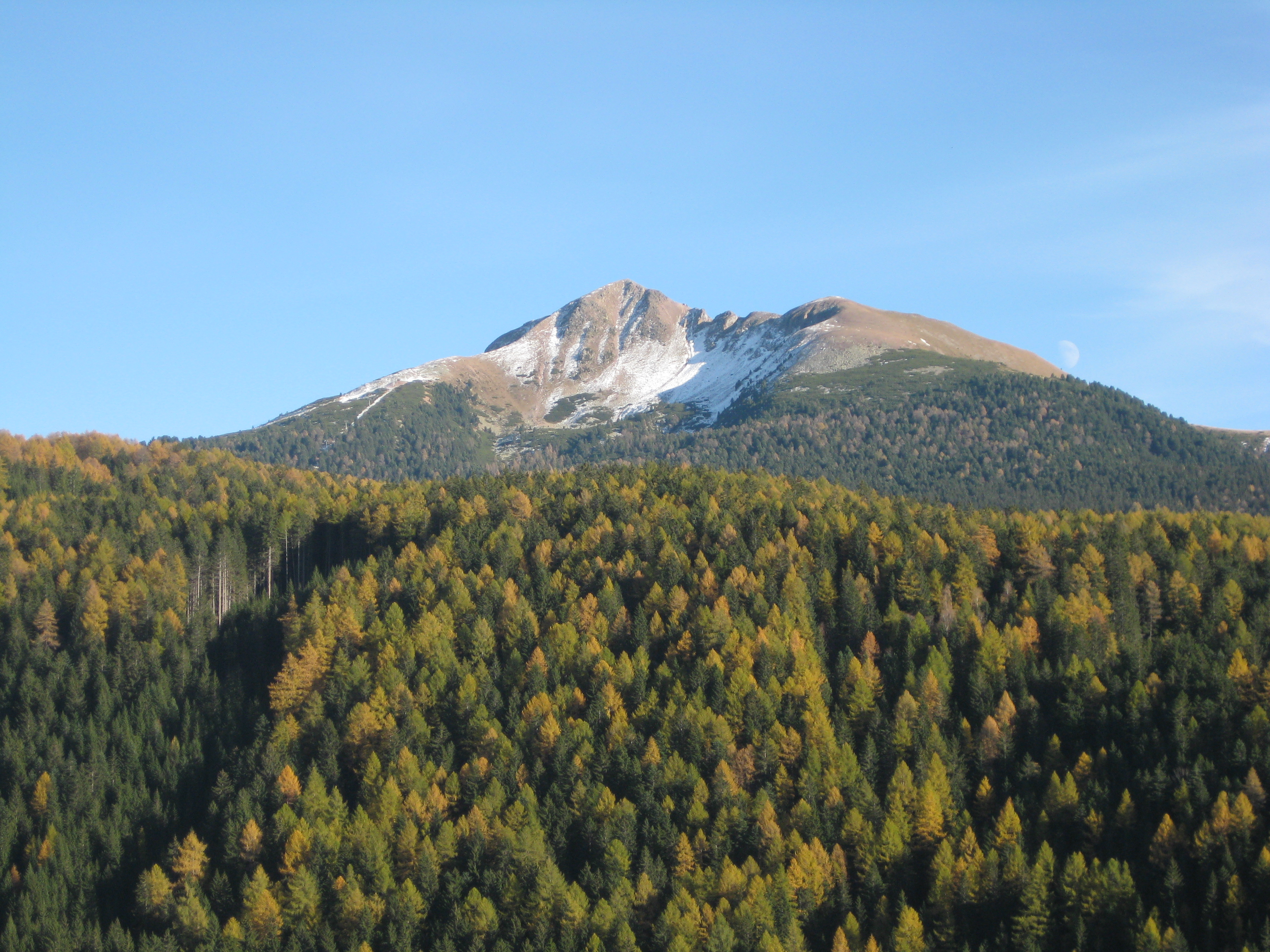
- Schwarzhorn

Highest point
- Elevation: 2,439 m (8,002 ft)
- Prominence: 637 m (2,090 ft)
- Coordinates: 46°20′9″N 11°26′48″E

Naming
- Native name: Schwarzhorn (German); Corno Nero (Italian)

Geography
- Location within Alps
- Country: Italy
- Region: South Tyrol
- Parent range: Fiemme Mountains

The Schwarzhorn (Italian: Corno Nero) is a mountain in South Tyrol, Italy. It belongs to the Fiemme Mountains and is 2,439 m high.
