= Weißhorn (South Tyrol) =

Mountain in the Alps

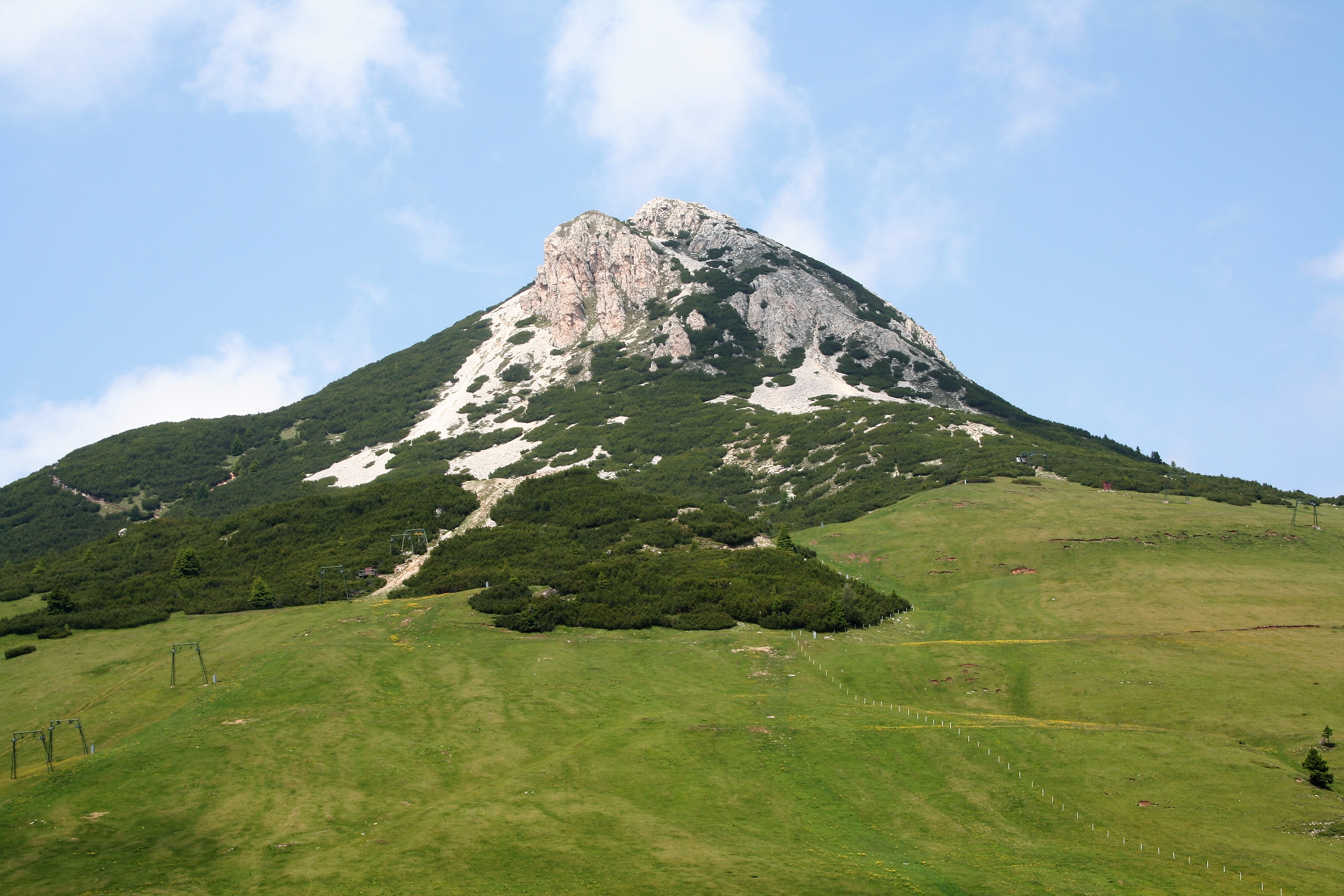

Highest point
- Elevation: 2,316 m (7,598 ft)
- Coordinates: 46°21′27″N 11°26′21″E

Geography
- Location: South Tyrol, Italy

The Weißhorn is a mountain in the Südtiroler Unterland in South Tyrol, Italy.
