= Niseko Volcanic Group =

Volcanic group on the island of Hokkaido, Japan

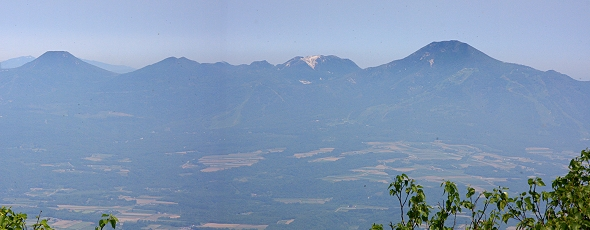

Highest point
- Peak: Nisekoannupuri
- Elevation: 1,308.0 m (4,291.3 ft)
- Prominence: 1,064 m (3,491 ft)
- Listing: Ribu
- Coordinates: 42°52′30″N 140°39′32″E

Naming
- Native name: ニセコ火山群 (Japanese); Niseko-kazangun (Japanese)

Geography
- Location within Japan Location within Hokkaido
- Country: Japan
- State: Hokkaidō
- Region: Shiribeshi Subprefecture
- Districts: Abuta District, Isoya District and Iwanai District
- Municipalities: Kutchan, Kyōwa, Niseko and Rankoshi
- Borders on: Mount Raiden Volcanic Group and Mount Yōtei
- Biome: alpine climate

Geology
- Rock age: Quaternary
- Mountain type: Stratovolcanoes
- Volcanic arc: Northeastern Japan Arc

Niseko Volcanic Group is a volcanic group of active stratovolcanoes and lava domes situated in Hokkaidō, Japan. The volcanoes are younger than 400,000 years. The last eruption was 6,000 to 7,000 years ago. Today Iwaonupuri shows fumarolic activity.

== List of peaks ==
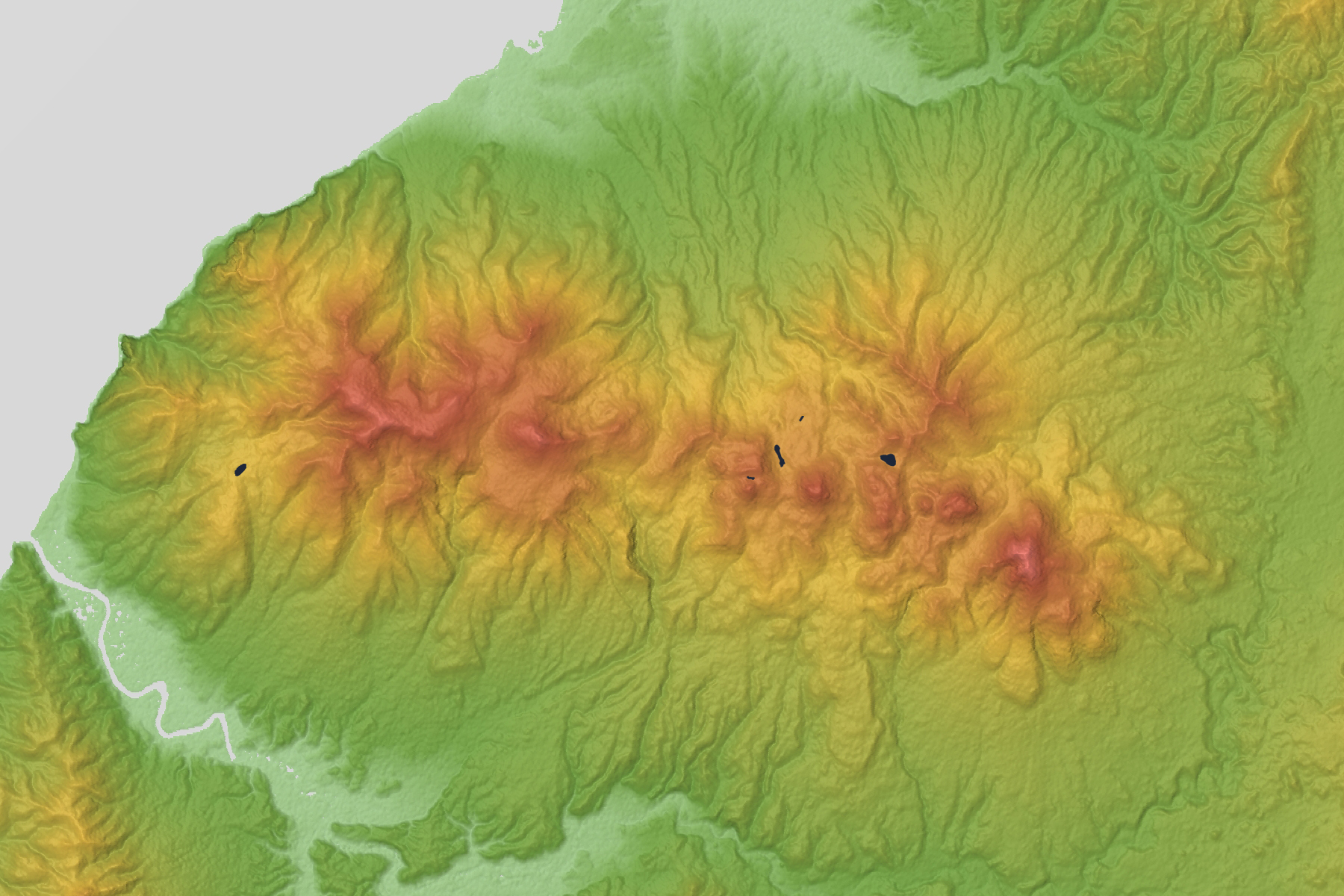
Relief map of Niseko-Raiden Volcano Group. Niseko Volcano Group (right), Raiden Volcano Group (left).

=== Niseko Volcanic Group ===
- Mount Niseko Annupuri (ニセコアンヌプリ)
- Mount Iwaonupuri (イワオヌプリ)
- Mount Waisuhorun (Weisshorn, ワイスホルン)
- Mount Nitonupuri (ニトヌプリ)
- Mount Chisenupuri (チセヌプリ)
- Mount Shirakaba (白樺山)
- Mount Mekunnaidake (目国内岳)

=== Raiden Volcano Group ===
- Mount Raiden (雷電山)
- Mount Mekunnaidake (目国内岳)
- Mount Iwanaidake (岩内岳)

== See also ==
- List of volcanoes in Japan
