= Unterberghorn =

Mountain in Tyrol, Austria

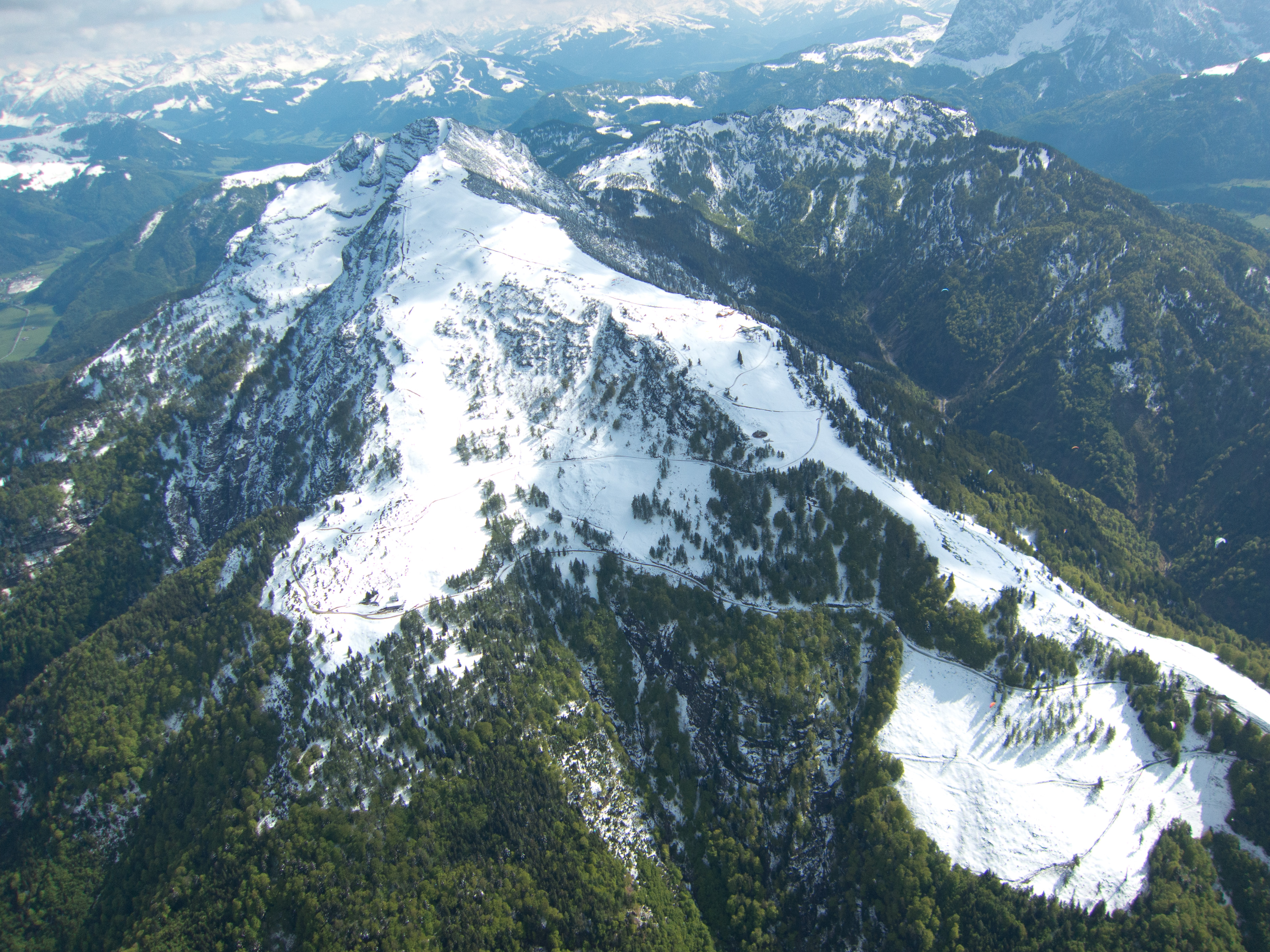
- Unterberghorn.

Highest point
- Elevation: 1,773 m (AA) (5,817 ft)
- Coordinates: 47°37′14″N 12°26′10″E

Geography
- Location within Austria
- Location: Tyrol, Austria
- Parent range: Chiemgau Alps

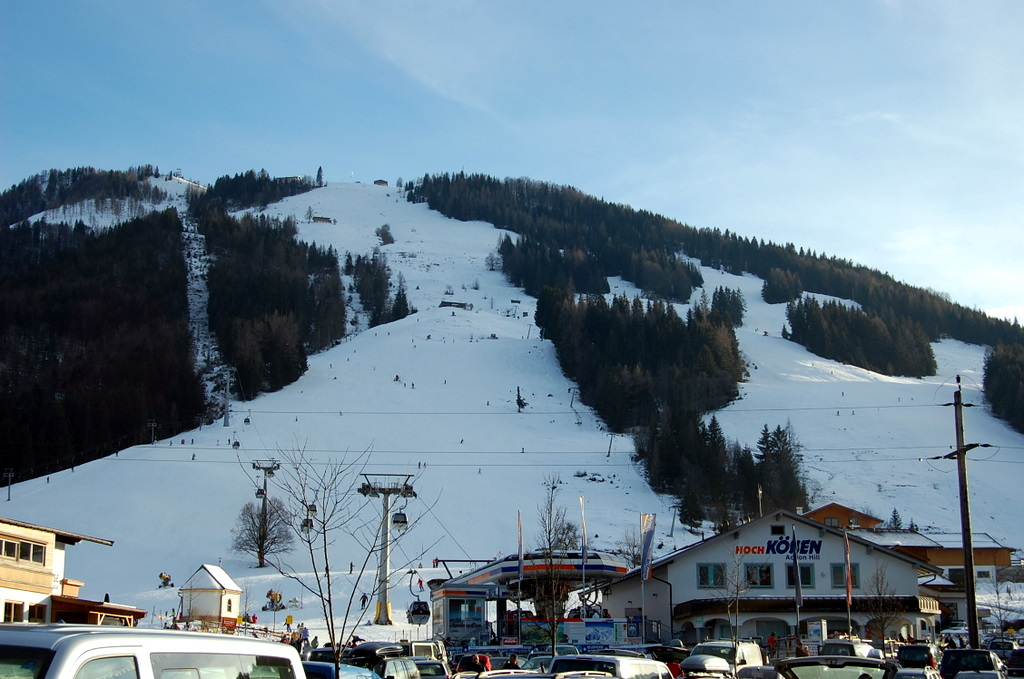
The valley station on the Unterberghornbahn in winter

The Unterberghorn (1,773 m (AA)) in the Austrian district of Kitzbühel in Tyrol is the highest peak between the mountain ranges of the Wilder Kaiser and Loferer Steinberge.

The horn or pyramidal peak has two summits - its subpeak is the Hefferthorn (1,735 m) - and is the local mountain (Hausberg) for the villages of Kössen (near the Bavarian border) and St. Johann in Tirol, between which it rises, west of the valley of the River Großache. It is all the more prominent because each of the two holiday villages lies in a deep basin. On the eastern side of the Ache valley the Fellhorn, at 1,765 metres, is almost as high.

The rock faces of this mountain massif, which belongs to the Northern Limestone Alps, run predominantly in a north-south direction, something which indicates the consistent pressure arising from Alpine mountain building. Deep troughs also run in both directions, whilst a large area of alpine pasture, the Zellerinalm lies on its eastern flank.

Another large alm forms the relatively gently sloping northern ridge, known as the Unterberg. A cable car runs between this ridge and the Unterbergalm (1,278 m), whilst the alm hut is served by a good road and ski lifts cover the entire north slope.

The popular holiday and ski resort is increasingly used by hikers as well as paragliders and hang gliders. The rivers draining to the north are heavily affected by changing weather conditions that can lead to flooding in the area of Kössen.
