= Brima Bazzy Kamara =

Sierra Leonean war criminal

Ibrahim ("Brima") Bazzy Kamara

Commander of the Sierra Leonean Armed Forces Revolutionary Council
- Incumbent
- Assumed office 1998

Personal details
- Born: Freetown, Sierra Leone
- Criminal information
- Status: Imprisoned
- Criminal charges: War crimes Crimes against humanity
- Penalty: 45 years' imprisonment

Ibrahim ("Brima") Bazzy Kamara (born 7 May 1968 in Freetown) is a Sierra Leonean former commander of the Armed Forces Revolutionary Council (AFRC). In 2007, he was convicted of committing war crimes and crimes against humanity in the Sierra Leone Civil War.

Kamara was born in the neighborhood of Wilberforce, in the west end of Freetown. In 1998, Kamara was invited by Johnny Paul Koroma to join the AFRC Supreme Council. In this capacity, Kamara was a commander of the AFRC and Revolutionary United Front forces which attacked civilians in the northern, eastern, and central areas of Sierra Leone in 1998 and in Freetown in January 1999.

Kamara was indicted on 7 March 2003 and arrested on 29 May 2003. His trial before the Special Court for Sierra Leone began on 7 March 2005. He was tried alongside Alex Tamba Brima and Santigie Borbor Kanu. Kamara was found guilty of crimes against humanity and war crimes on 20 June 2007, including counts of murder, rape, forced labour, and the use of child soldiers. He and his codefendants' convictions were the first convictions for the Special Court for Sierra Leone and were also the first time anyone had been convicted of the international crime of using child soldiers. On 19 July 2007, Kamara was sentenced to 45 years' imprisonment. He is serving his sentence in Mpanga Prison in Rwanda.
