= Santigie Borbor Kanu =

Sierra Leonean military commander

Santigie Borbor Kanu (also known as Five-Five) (born March 1965) was a Sierra Leonean military commander in the Armed Forces Revolutionary Council (AFRC). He was one of a group of seventeen soldiers in the military of Sierra Leone who successfully staged a coup that ousted president Ahmad Tejan Kabbah in May 1997. In 2007, Kanu was convicted of committing war crimes and crimes against humanity in the Sierra Leone Civil War.

Kanu was born either in Freetown or in the Maforki Chiefdom in the Port Loko District of Sierra Leone. He was invited by Johnny Paul Koroma to join the AFRC Supreme Council. In this capacity, he served as the commander of the AFRC and Revolutionary United Front forces that attacked civilians in the north, east, and centre of Sierra Leone in 1998 and in Freetown in January 1999.

Kanu was indicted on 15 September 2003, and arrested on 16 September 2003. His trial before the Special Court for Sierra Leone began on 7 March 2005. He was tried with Brima Bazzy Kamara and Alex Tamba Brima. Kanu was found guilty of crimes against humanity and war crimes on June 20 2007, including counts of murder, rape, forced labour, and the use of child soldiers. He and his co-defendants' convictions were the first convictions for the Special Court for Sierra Leone and were also the first time anyone had been convicted of the international crime of using child soldiers. On 19 July 2007, Kanu was sentenced to 50 years' imprisonment, which he is serving at Mpanga prison in Rwanda.
