= Alex Tamba Brima =

Sierra Leone military commander (1971–2016)

Sierra Leonean Military Commander

Personal details
- Born: 23 November 1971 Yaryah, Kono District, Sierra Leone
- Died: 9 June 2016 (aged 44) Kigali, Rwanda
- Party: Military Junta (AFRC)
- Spouse: Margaret
- Profession: Soldier

Alex Tamba Brima (23 November 1971 – 9 June 2016), also known as Gullit, was a Sierra Leonean military commander. He was one of a group of seventeen soldiers in the Sierra Leone Armed Forces who called themselves Armed Forces Revolutionary Council (AFRC) that successfully staged a coup that ousted president Ahmad Tejan Kabbah in May 1997. On 19 July 2007 he was convicted and sentenced to 50 years in prison for committing war crimes and crimes against humanity during the Sierra Leone Civil War.

== Biography ==
Brima was born in the village of Yaryah, Kono District, Sierra Leone, to parents from the Kono ethnic group. In April 1985, he joined the Sierra Leone Army, where he was promoted to the rank of Staff Sergeant. In 1998, Brima was invited by Johnny Paul Koroma to join the AFRC Supreme Council. In this capacity, Brima was a commander of the AFRC and Revolutionary United Front forces that attacked civilians in the north, east, and centre of Sierra Leone in 1998 and in Freetown in January 1999.

Brima was indicted on 7 March 2003, arrested on 10 March 2003 and his trial before the Special Court for Sierra Leone began on 7 March 2005. He was tried with Brima Bazzy Kamara and Santigie Borbor Kanu. Brima was found guilty of crimes against humanity and war crimes on 20 June 2007, including counts of murder, rape, forced labour, and the use of child soldiers. He and his codefendants' convictions were the first convictions for the Special Court for Sierra Leone and were also the first time anyone had been convicted of the international crime of using child soldiers. On 19 July 2007, Brima was sentenced to 50 years' imprisonment; he was imprisoned in Rwanda.

Brima's death at the King Faisal Hospital in Kigali, Rwanda, was announced on 9 June 2016. He was 44.
