= Liberated Zone (Sierra Leone) =

Territory of the Revolutionary United Front

- 1991–2002
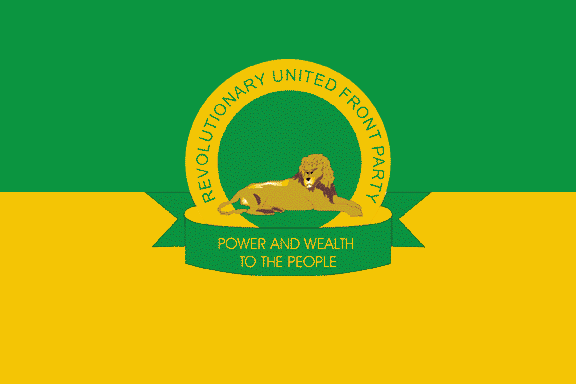
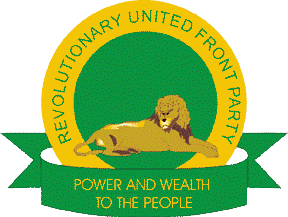
- RUF Party flag Coat of arms
- Status: Quasi-state
- Capital: Kono (RUF stronghold from 1992 on)
- Leader of the Revolutionary United Front
  - 1991–1997: Foday Sankoh
  - 1997–1999: Sam Bockarie
  - 1999–2000: Foday Sankoh
  - 2000: Vacant
  - 2000–2002: Issa Sesay
- Spokesperson of the Revolutionary United Front
  - Unknown: Fayia Musa, Gibril Massakoi and Omrie Michael Golley
- Establishment: Sierra Leone Civil War
- History
  - Established: 23 March 1991
  - Capturing of Foday Sankoh: 17 May 2000
  - Disestablished: 18 January 2002
Preceded by	Succeeded by
Republic of Sierra Leone	Republic of Sierra Leone

The Liberated Zone was the name the Revolutionary United Front gave their territories during the Sierra Leone Civil War.

== Territory ==
The Revolutionary United Front started their takeover of territories at the start of the Sierra Leone Civil War on 23 March 1991, in one month they took almost all of the Eastern Province. They took over areas in which diamond mines existed, mostly in the east, they put their sight on these areas to finance themselves. With the diamonds they bought weapons from Charles Taylor, or soldiers were trained in exchange. In early 1995 the RUF moved within several miles of Freetown. In 2000 the RUF almost controlled all of Sierra Leone, except for the capital city Freetown.

== Governance ==
From 1991 until 1995, the Liberated Zone was under limited martial rule.

=== Military ===
==== Recruitment ====
The RUF took advantage of the refugees, who were abandoned, starving, and in dire need of medical attention, by promising food, shelter, medical care, and looting and mining profits in return for their support. When this method of recruitment failed, as it often did for the RUF, youths were often coerced at gunpoint to join the ranks of the RUF. After being kidnapped or forced to join, many child soldiers learned that the complete lack of law – as a result of the civil war – provided a unique opportunity for self-empowerment through violence and thus continued to support the rebel cause.

=== Economy ===
==== Diamond mining ====
Some people that lived in the Liberated Zone were forced to work in diamond mines. The estimated of the volume of RUF diamonds vary widely, from $25 million per annum to $125 million, with this the RUF military activity sustained.

=== Health care ===
The Liberated Zone claimed that they provided limited health care, similar to other sectors like schooling, housing and seedlings. The US Department of State reported in 2000 that the people don't have access to the most basic social services like health care and education.

== See also ==
- Greater Liberia
