= Sam Bockarie =

Sierra Leonean rebel (1963–2003)

Commander of the Revolutionary United Front
- In office 2000–2003

Personal details
- Born: Samuel "Sam" Bockarie; 2 October 1964 Koidu Town, Kono District, Sierra Leone
- Died: 5 May 2003 (aged 38) Liberia
- Cause of death: Gunshot wound
- Party: Revolutionary United Front

Military service
- Allegiance: Sierra Leone
- Branch/service: Sierra Leone Armed Forces
- Battles/wars: Sierra Leone Civil War

Samuel "Sam" Bockarie (2 October 1964 – 5 May 2003), widely known as Mosquito, was a Sierra Leonean politician and army commander who served as a leader of the Revolutionary United Front (RUF). Bockarie was infamous during the Sierra Leone Civil War for his brutal tactics, which included amputation, mutilation, and rape. He earned the nickname "Mosquito" for his ability to attack when his enemies were off-guard, mainly during the night. In the book Merchant of Death, the author states the nickname came from Bockarie's claims that he would "suck the life out of his enemies." During his service in the RUF, he befriended future Liberian president Charles Taylor, and RUF commander Foday Sankoh. When Sankoh was imprisoned from March 1997 until April 1999, Bockarie served as commander of the RUF in his place.

== Youth ==
Sam Bockarie was born on 2 October 1964 in Koidu Town, Kono District in the Eastern Province of Sierra Leone. Bockarie was the son of a diamond miner and he was raised in his hometown of Koidu Town. Following in his father's footsteps, Bockarie dropped out of secondary school to become a diamond miner. In 1985, he left the mines and started a career as a professional disco dancer, touring the countryside. He eventually moved to Liberia, and then to Abidjan, Côte d'Ivoire where he worked as a barber, electrician, and waiter.

== Military career ==
In 1989, Charles Taylor's National Patriotic Front of Liberia (NPFL) invaded Liberia from Côte d'Ivoire, where Bockarie was living at the time. However, Bockarie did not join until later that year, when he met recruits who were talking about taking action in Sierra Leone. He went with the group to join guerrilla training exercises held along the border of Sierra Leone and Liberia. He was officially a part of the newly formed RUF in 1990, and was a part of the initial incursion into Sierra Leone in 1991.

In 1992, Bockarie made the move into the upper leadership of the RUF, becoming Battle Group Commander, answerable only to the Battle Field Commander and Foday Sankoh, the leader of the RUF. In March 1997, Sankoh fled to Nigeria, where he was put under house arrest, and then imprisoned. From this time until Sankoh's release in 1999, Bockarie performed the task of director of military operations of the RUF, with alleged advice from Charles Taylor. During this time, Sankoh worked with the Armed Forces Revolutionary Council (AFRC), the group of Sierra Leone Army (SLA) officers which had overthrown President Ahmed Tejan Kabbah on 25 May 1997, and held the presidency until February 1998. Bockarie held the position of Chief of Defence Staff in the RUF/AFRC led junta government. In January 1999, Bockarie along with AFRC commander Johnny Paul Koroma planned and launched a devastating attack on Freetown, the capital of Sierra Leone.

On 7 July 1999, the Lomé Peace Accord was signed by president Kabbah and RUF/AFRC leader Sankoh, after Sankoh had gotten the consent of his field commanders, including Bockarie. However, tension continued in Sierra Leone, especially due to a new rebel faction called the West Side Boys, leading to more attacks in and around Freetown in May 2000. Bockarie was reluctant to ask his forces to disarm amidst the new tension, and he and Sankoh had a falling out in the early spring of 2000. By the time Freetown was again embroiled in violence, Bockarie had fled to Liberia's capital, Monrovia. Rebel forces did not begin to disarm until 2001.

== Indictment for crimes against humanity ==
On 3 March 2003, Sam Bockarie was indicted for crimes against humanity, violation of the Geneva Convention and violation of international humanitarian law. He was slated for trial by the Special Court for Sierra Leone (SCSL). Bockarie was accused of colluding with the AFRC/RUF coalition to take over much of Sierra Leone, particularly the diamond-rich areas such as the Kenema and Kono districts. During this time, Bockarie commanded his troops to attack civilian populations who he felt were supporting the government of Ahmad Tejan Kabbah, including the use of mutilation and sexual violence. These attacks brought to the world the horrific images of children with missing arms and legs. He was also accused of recruiting child soldiers and abducting people to fight with him, and of attacking UN peacekeepers working under UNAMSIL.

== In exile ==
After fleeing Sierra Leone in 2000, Bockarie joined with Taylor's Anti-Terrorist Unit (ATU) in Liberia, (Bockarie moved to Liberia under an ECOWAS agreement with the then Sierra Leonean President) eventually moving to the Ivory Coast, where he participated in the rebellion led by Guillaume Soro in connection with the Gbatala base headed by Charles Taylor. Under international pressure, Taylor initiated a policy of disengagement with regards to former RUF leaders, and officially expelled Bockarie from the country, although he was reported to have continued to travel freely between Liberia and Côte d'Ivoire. To secure peace in the Ivorian Civil War, and increase trade with president Laurent Gbagbo, Taylor was said to have asked Bockarie to assassinate Ivorian rebel leader Félix Doh, who was killed in April 2003.

As early as 27 April 2003, Bockarie's actions had brought him back into Liberian territory, where Charles Taylor was now President. The UN received news of Bockarie's presence, and put pressure on Taylor to apprehend him and turn him over to the SCSL. Late in the day on Monday, 5 May 2003, Bockarie was killed in what was officially reported to be a shootout with Liberian forces. There is some controversy that, since Bockarie's testimony at the SCSL could have implicated Taylor, Taylor sent the troops to find and kill Bockarie, rather than to arrest the man (Perspective, 2003). In any case, after a short time of confusion over the veracity of reports on Bockarie's death, proceedings against Bockarie by the SCSL were terminated on 8 December 2003.

== Resources ==
- Trial Watch Biography and description of indictment
- BBC News article at the time of Bockarie's death
- "The Mysterious Death of a Fugitive". The Perspective. Atlanta, Georgia 7 May 2003
