= John Rosolu Bankole Thompson =

Sierra Leonean academic (1936–2021)

Professor John Rosolu Bankole Thompson
- Born: John Rosolu Bankole Thompson; 15 December 1936; Freetown, British Sierra Leone
- Died: 15 May 2021 (aged 84); Freetown, Sierra Leone
- Education: Fourah Bay College and Christ's College, University of Cambridge
- Occupations: Judge, Jurist, Professor, Academic, lawyer
- Spouse: Dr Adiatu Thompson

John Rosolu Bankole Thompson (15 December 1936 - 15 May 2021) was a Sierra Leonean judge and jurist who published several studies on the law of Sierra Leone. Bankole Thompson served on the Special Court for Sierra Leone and headed the Commission of Inquiry for the Government of Sierra Leone and the Sierra Leone Anti-corruption Commission from 2018.

== Education ==
Thompson was born in Freetown, Sierra Leone to Sierra Leonean parents of Creole ethnicity. He was educated at Prince of Wales School in Freetown, Sierra Leone and matriculated at Fourah Bay College where he studied philosophy and liberal arts and received a bachelor's degree and master's. Following a brief career in teaching in local schools in Freetown, he was awarded a fellowship to study at Christ's College, Cambridge where he received an LLB, LLM, and a doctorate in law. He was a member of the Inner Temple and was subsequently called to the bar in England in 1971.

== Career ==
Thompson returned to Freetown, Sierra Leone and served as a state attorney and rose to the position of principal state attorney in the Office of the Attorney General. He was subsequently appointed a legal adviser to the Mano River Union and served in this role from 1977 to 1981. He was subsequently appointed to the high court by the Government of Sierra Leone and served there between 1981 and 1987.

After being invited to the United States by a U.S. judge, through Operation Crossroads Africa, Bankole Thompson toured the United States. He decided to remain in the United States and he was appointed in 1988 as the David Brennan Endowed Professor in comparative constitutional Law at Akron University.

Subsequent to his role at Akron University, he was also appointed to the faculty of Eastern Kentucky University as a professor in the Criminal Justice and Police Studies department. He also served as the dean of graduate studies at Eastern Kentucky University.

== Special Court for Sierra Leone ==
Bankole Thompson served alongside George Gelaga King on a three panelled judiciary on the Special Court for Sierra Leone to try cases relating to the Sierra Leone Civil War.

== Commission of Inquiry for the Government of Sierra Leone ==
In 2018, Bankole Thompson was appointed to lead one of three Commissions of Inquiry for the Government of Sierra Leone to investigate allegations of corruption in the immediate past Government.

== Death ==
After a brief illness, Bankole Thompson died on 15 May 2021 in Freetown, Sierra Leone. He was survived by his wife, Dr Adiatu Thompson and his seven children.

== Publications ==
- The Constitutional History and Law of Sierra Leone (1961-1995)
- Universal Jurisdiction: The Sierra Leone Profile
- The Criminal Law of Sierra Leone
- American Criminal Procedures (a co-authored book)

== Sources ==
- https://thenewdawnliberia.com/rscsl-justice-rosolu-john-bankole-thompson-is-dead/
- https://cocorioko.net/judge-bankole-thompson-dies/
- https://sierraloaded.sl/news/commissions-of-inquiry-judge-bankole-thompson-dead/
- https://issuu.com/christsalumni/docs/christs_mag_2016_web
- https://kentuckyoralhistory.org/ark:/16417/xt73ff3m0387
- http://rscsl.org/Trial_Chamber_I.html
