= Special Court for Sierra Leone =

Judicial body

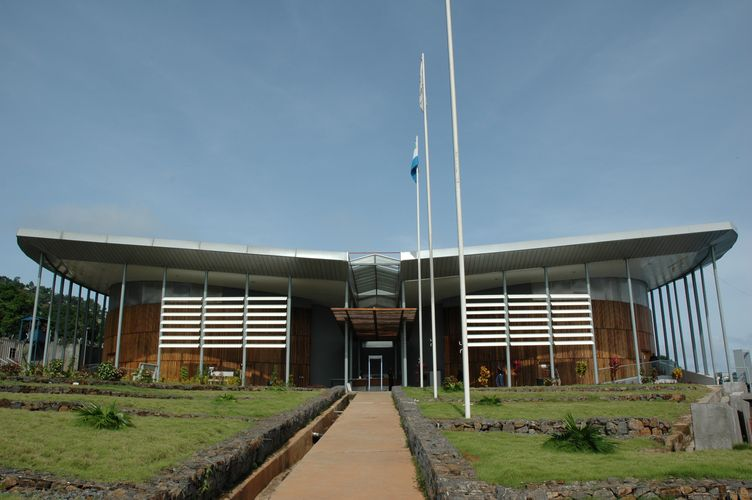
- Special Court for Sierra Leone
- Established: 16 January 2002
- Dissolved: 2 December 2013
- Jurisdiction: Sierra Leone
- Location: Freetown, Sierra Leone (Charles Taylor trial moved to The Hague, Netherlands)
- Composition method: Appointment by government of Sierra Leone or Secretary-General of the United Nations
- Authorised by: Statute; Other international instruments
- Number of positions: 8–11 (later expanded)
- Website: rscsl.org

President
- Currently: Rotational and various

The Special Court for Sierra Leone, or the "Special Court" (SCSL), also called the Sierra Leone Tribunal, was a judicial body set up by the government of Sierra Leone and the United Nations to "prosecute persons who bear the greatest responsibility for serious violations of international humanitarian law and Sierra Leonean law" committed in Sierra Leone after 30 November 1996 and during the Sierra Leone Civil War. The court's working language was English. The court listed offices in Freetown, The Hague, and New York City.

Following its dissolution in 2013, it was replaced by the Residual Special Court for Sierra Leone in order to complete its mandate and manage a variety of ongoing and ad-hoc functions, including witness protection and support, supervision of prison sentences and claims for compensation.

On 26 April 2012, former Liberian President Charles Taylor became the first African head of state to be convicted for his part in war crimes.

== Origin ==
On 12 June 2000, Sierra Leone's President Ahmad Tejan Kabbah wrote a letter to United Nations Secretary-General Kofi Annan asking the international community to try those responsible for crimes during the conflict. On 10 August 2000, the United Nations Security Council adopted Resolution 1315 requesting the Secretary-General to start negotiations with the Sierra Leonean government to create a Special Court.

On 16 January 2002, the UN and the government of Sierra Leone signed an agreement establishing the court. A contract was awarded to Sierra Construction Systems, the largest construction company in Sierra Leone, to construct the building that would house the court. The first staff members arrived in Freetown in July 2002.

On 10 March 2004, the new courthouse building of the Special Court for Sierra Leone was officially opened, before an audience of national and international dignitaries.

As of April 2012, over 40 states had contributed funds for the court's work, with the most notable African contributor being Nigeria. In 2004, 2011 and 2012, the SCSL received funding from subventions from the United Nations.

== Jurisdiction ==
The SCSL had the jurisdiction to try any persons who committed crimes against humanity against civilians that included: murder; extermination; enslavement; deportation; imprisonment; torture; rape, sexual slavery, forced prostitution or any other form of sexual violence; persecution on the basis of politics, race, ethnicity or religion; and other "inhumane acts." In addition, the court would have jurisdiction to prosecute those who violated the Geneva Convention of 1949, as well as Sierra Leone's Prevention of Cruelty to Children Act, 1926 for the abuse of girls and Malicious Damage Act 1861. However, the court does not have jurisdiction over those under the age of 15. Further, it was superior to any court of Sierra Leone and could take precedence in cases of possible conflicting jurisdiction. Previous amnesties contrary to the remit of the court would be invalid.

=== Punishment ===
All sentences should be carried out within Sierra Leone, unless there was no capacity to deal with the accused, at which point any states pursuant to the International Criminal Tribunal for Rwanda or the International Criminal Tribunal for the former Yugoslavia who have acceded a willingness to host the accused for the tenure of their sentence can hold the prisoner. Enforcement would be carried out by the court. For a detailed discuss of the sentencing practice and punishments imposed by the Special Court for Sierra Leone read Shahram Dana, The Sentencing Legacy of the Special Court for Sierra Leone, 42 Georgia Journal of International and Comparative Law 615 (2014).

Commuting sentences would be up to the state in consultation with the court.

== Structure ==
The Special Court consisted of three institutions: the Registry, the Office of the Prosecutor, and the Chambers (for trials and appeals).

=== Registry ===
The Registry was responsible for the overall management of the court.

Registrars:

Name	Country	Appointed by	Acted from	Appointed	Term ended
Robin Vincent	United Kingdom	Secretary-General	19 April 2002	10 June 2002	3 October 2005
Lovemore G. Munlo	Malawi	Secretary-General	3 October 2005	24 February 2006	20 March 2007
Herman von Hebel	Netherlands	Secretary-General	20 March 2007	20 July 2007	1 June 2009
Binta Mansaray	Sierra Leone	Secretary-General	1 June 2009	16 February 2010	2 December 2013

=== Office of the Prosecutor ===
The current prosecutor, Brenda Hollis, previously the principal trial attorney in the Charles Taylor case, was appointed by the UNSG and took up her office in February 2010. The prosecutor and her team investigate crimes, gather evidence and submit indictments to the judges. The Deputy Prosecutor is Joseph Kamara, a Sierra Leonean, nominated by that government and appointed by the Secretary General. Kamara took up his post on 15 August 2008.

=== Chambers ===
The statute of the court indicated eight to eleven judges. Three would serve in the trial chamber (of which one would be appointed by the Sierra Leonean government and two by the UN Secretary-General) and five would serve in the appeals chamber (of which two would be appointed by the Sierra Leonean government and three by the UN secretary-general).

At closure there were twelve judges, of which seven were Trial Judges (five UN appointed—including one alternate—and two nominated by the Sierra Leone government). The remaining five were Appeals Judges, three of whom were appointed by the UN and two nominated by the Sierra Leone government. Judges were appointed for a term of three years, with an option for re-appointment.

Appeals Chamber:

Name	Country	Position	Appointed by	Appointed	Term ended
Shireen Avis Fisher	United States	President	Secretary-General	2009	2013
Emmanuel Ayoola	Nigeria	Vice-President	Secretary-General	2002	2013
George Gelaga King	Sierra Leone	Member	Sierra Leone	2002	2013
Renate Winter	Austria	Member	Secretary-General	2002	2013
Jon Kamanda	Sierra Leone	Member	Sierra Leone	2007	2013
Philip Nyamu Waki	Kenya	Alternate	Sierra Leone/Secretary-General	27 February 2012	

Trial Chamber I judges:

Name	Country	Position	Appointed by	Appointed	Term ended
Pierre G. Boutet	Canada	Presiding Judge	Secretary-General	2002	2013
Rosolu John Bankole Thompson	Sierra Leone	Member	Sierra Leone	2002	2013
Benjamin Mutanga Itoe	Cameroon	Member	Secretary-General	2002	2013

Trial Chamber II judges:

Name	Country	Position	Appointed by	Appointed	Term ended
Richard Lussick	Samoa	Presiding Judge	Sierra Leone	2005	2013
Teresa Doherty	United Kingdom	Member	Secretary General	2005	2013
Julia Sebutinde	Uganda	Member	Secretary General	2005	2013
El Hadji Malick Sow	Senegal	Alternate (Charles Taylor trial)	United Nations	2007	2013

=== Former judges ===
- Geoffrey Robertson United Kingdom (2002–2007), appeals chamber, quit under allegations of bias over publication of a book vilifying the RUF.
- Raja N. Fernando Sri Lanka (2004–2008), appeals chamber, died.

== Indictees ==
The Statute of the Special Court for Sierra Leone outlines four different types of crimes with which the Court can charge individuals. They are crimes against humanity, violations of Article 3 common to the Geneva Conventions and of Additional Protocol II (war crimes), other serious violations of international humanitarian law, and crimes under Sierra Leonean law. If found guilty, sentencing could include prison terms or have their property confiscated. The SCSL, as with all other tribunals established by the United Nations, does not have the power to impose the death penalty. Thus far, 13 individuals have been indicted on charges of committing crimes against humanity, war crimes, and other violations of international humanitarian law. No individuals have been charged with crimes under Sierra Leonean law.

A total of 23 people have been indicted in the SCSL. Proceedings against 22 people have been completed: six are serving their sentences, one died while serving his sentence, nine have finished their sentences, three have been acquitted, and three have died prior to the conclusion of the proceedings against them. Proceedings against one person, Johnny Paul Koroma, are ongoing; he is a fugitive, although he is believed to be deceased.

=== Overview ===
The list below details the counts against each individual indicted in the Court and his or her current status. The column titled H lists the number of counts (if any) of crimes against humanity with which an individual has been charged. W the number of counts of war crimes and violations of international humanitarian law, D the number of counts of crimes under Sierra Leonean law, and C the number of counts of contempt of the Court. Note that these are the counts with which an individual was indicted, not convicted.

Name	Indicted	H	W	D	C	Detained	Current status	Ind.
Sam Bockarie	7 March 2003	7	10	—	—		Died on 5 May 2003; charges withdrawn on 8 December 2003	
Alex Brima	7 March 2003	7	8	—	—	10 March 2003	Died on 9 June 2016 while serving sentence of 50 years' imprisonment	
Morris Kallon	7 March 2003	8	10	—	—	10 March 2003	Serving sentence of 40 years' imprisonment in Rwanda	
Johnny Paul Koroma	7 March 2003	7	10	—	—		Fugitive; reported to have died in 2003 or on 10 or 11 August 2017	
Samuel Norman	7 March 2003	2	6	—	—	10 March 2003	Died on 22 February 2007; proceedings terminated on 21 May 2007	
Foday Sankoh	7 March 2003	7	10	—	—	10 March 2003	Died on 29 July 2003; proceedings terminated on 8 December 2003	
Issa Sesay	7 March 2003	8	10	—	—	10 March 2003	Serving sentence of 52 years' imprisonment in Rwanda	
Charles Taylor	7 March 2003	5	6	—	—	29 March 2006	Serving sentence of 50 years' imprisonment in the United Kingdom	
Augustine Gbao (Note: Augustine Gbao served 17 years and 292 days of his sentence of 25 years' imprisonment in detention.)	16 April 2003	8	10	—	—	10 March 2003	Paroled on 22 December 2020	
Brima Kamara (Note: Brima Kamara and Santigie Kanu's sentences also includes those from their contempt case for which they were indicted on 24 May 2011.)	28 May 2003	7	8	—	3	10 March 2003	Serving sentence of 46 years and 50 weeks' imprisonment in Rwanda	
Moinina Fofana (Note: Moinina Fofana served 11 years and 298 days of his sentence of 15 years' imprisonment in detention.)	26 June 2003	2	6	—	—	29 May 2003	Completed commuted sentence on 29 May 2018 (released on 18 March 2016)	
Allieu Kondewa (Note: Allieu Kondewa served 15 years and 44 days of his sentence of 20 years' imprisonment in detention.)	26 June 2003	2	6	—	—	29 May 2003	Completed commuted sentence on 28 May 2023 (released on 7 July 2018)	
Santigie Kanu	16 September 2003	7	8	—	2	17 September 2003	Serving sentence of 51 years and 50 weeks' imprisonment in Rwanda	
Brima Samura	25 April 2005	—	—	—	1	Summoned	Acquitted on 26 October 2005	
Margaret Brima	25 April 2005	—	—	—	1	Summoned	Completed sentence of 1 year's probation on 20 September 2006	
Neneh Jalloh	25 April 2005	—	—	—	1	Summoned	Completed sentence of 1 year's probation on 20 September 2006	
Esther Kamara	25 April 2005	—	—	—	1	Summoned	Completed sentence of 1 year's probation on 20 September 2006	
Anifa Kamara	25 April 2005	—	—	—	1	Summoned	Completed sentence of 1 year's probation on 20 September 2006	
Hassan Bangura	24 May 2011	—	—	—	2	18 June 2012	Completed sentence of 18 months' imprisonment on 11 October 2013	
Samuel Kargbo (Note: Samuel Kargbo's sentence of 18 months' imprisonment was suspended following the successful completion of 2 years' probation.)	24 May 2011	—	—	—	2	Summoned	Completed commuted sentence on 11 October 2014	
Eric Senessie	24 May 2011	—	—	—	9	15 June 2012	Completed sentence of 2 years' imprisonment on 13 June 2014	
Courtenay Griffiths	19 June 2012	—	—	—	1	Summoned	Acquitted on 19 October 2012	—
Prince Taylor	4 October 2012	—	—	—	9	6 October 2012	Acquitted on 30 October 2013	

=== Civil Defence Forces (CDF) ===
Three of the indictees were leaders of the Civil Defence Forces (CDF), i.e. Allieu Kondewa, Moinina Fofana, and former Interior Minister Samuel Hinga Norman. Their trial started on 3 June 2004 and concluded with closing arguments in September 2006. Norman died in custody on 22 February 2007 before judgement after having undergone a surgical procedure in Dakar, Senegal. The trial proceedings against him were accordingly terminated.

=== Revolutionary United Front (RUF) ===
Five leaders of the Revolutionary United Front (RUF) were indicted: Foday Sankoh, Sam Bockarie, Issa Hassan Sesay, Morris Kallon and Augustine Gbao. The charges against Sankoh and Bockarie were dropped after their deaths were officially ascertained. The trial for Kallon, Gbao and Sesay began on 5 July 2004. It concluded on 24 June 2008. Final oral arguments were conducted on 4 and 5 August 2008.

=== Armed Forces Revolutionary Council (AFRC) ===
Three of the detained indictees belonged to the Armed Forces Revolutionary Council (AFRC): Alex Tamba Brima (also known as Gullit), Brima Bazzy Kamara and Santigie Borbor Kanu (also known as Five-Five). Their trial began on 7 March 2005.

The only indicted person who is not detained, and whose whereabouts remain uncertain, is the former dictator and AFRC chairman Johnny Paul Koroma, who seized power in a military coup on 25 May 1997. He was widely reported to have been killed in June 2003, but as definitive evidence of his death has never been provided his indictment has not been dropped.

=== Charles Taylor ===
The former President of Liberia, Charles Taylor, was accused of involvement in the civil war. Taylor was originally indicted in 2003, but he was given asylum in Nigeria after fleeing Liberia. In March 2006, Taylor fled from his house in Nigeria and was arrested at the Cameroon border. Taylor was extradited to the SCSL following a request to this effect by the Liberian government. He was then immediately turned over to the SCSL.

Because Taylor still enjoyed considerable support in Liberia, President Ellen Johnson-Sirleaf requested the trial to be moved to The Hague. The Dutch government called for United Nations Security Council Resolution 1688 to take him but also requested a third country to hold him if convicted, to which the United Kingdom agreed. His trial in Freetown was deemed undesirable for security reasons with UNAMSIL having considerably reduced its presence. United Nations Security Council Resolution 1688 of 17 June 2006 allowed the Special Court to transfer Taylor's case to The Hague, Netherlands, where the physical infrastructure of the International Criminal Court would be used with the trial still being conducted under the SCSL's auspices. Taylor's trial started on 4 June 2007, with the first witness appearing 7 January 2008.

The prosecution rested its case on 27 February 2009, and the defense began their case on 13 July and rested on 12 November 2010. The Trial Chamber II scheduled the announcement of its verdict on 26 April 2012 The verdict was read starting at 11:00 by the presiding judge Richard Lussick, who said that "the trial chamber unanimously finds you guilty of aiding and abetting [all of these] crimes:" acts of terrorism; murder; violence to life, health or physical well being of persons; rape; sexual slavery; outrages upon personal dignity; violence to life, health and physical or mental well being of persons; other inhumane acts, a crime against humanity; conscripting or enlisting children under the age of 15 years into the armed forces; enslavement; and pillage in accordance with article 6.1 of the SCSL's statute. His sentence would be announced on 30 May after a hearing in which Taylor would be given the opportunity to speak on 16 May. An appeal could also be filed within 14 days of the decision.

Though Taylor had rejected complicity on any of the charges, the court said that he ordered and supported the RUF, while the prosecution said that RUF's undermining of a 1999 ceasefire prolonged the war and was financed by Taylor through the proceeds of illegally mined "blood diamonds." In reaction to the verdict, Richard Dekker, the head of the international justice programme at Human Rights Watch said: "The Taylor verdict is a watershed moment, however it turns out. As president, Taylor is believed to have been responsible for so much murder and mayhem which unfolded in Sierra Leone. His was a shadow that loomed across the region". Christine Cheng of Exeter College, Oxford pointed to the politicisation of the trial and the degree to which the trial has been funded by Western states, though she added that the conclusion of Taylor's trial represented a "milestone for the pursuit of international justice." The prosecutor Brenda J. Hollis reacted to the verdict in saying:

Today is for the people of Sierra Leone who suffered horribly because of Charles Taylor. This judgment brings some measure of justice to the many thousands of victims who paid a terrible price for Mr. Taylor's crimes. Today's historic judgment reinforces the new reality, that Heads of State will be held to account for war crimes and other international crimes. This judgment affirms that with leadership comes not just power and authority, but also responsibility and accountability. No person, no matter how powerful, is above the law. The judges found that Mr. Taylor aided and abetted the crimes charged in counts 1 through 11, and that he planned with Sam Bockarie the attacks on Kono, Makeni and Freetown in late 1998 and January 1999 during which the charged crimes were committed. The Trial Chamber's findings made clear the central role Charles Taylor played in the horrific crimes against the people of Sierra Leone. Mr. Taylor's conviction for murder acknowledges the thousands who were brutally killed. These men, women and children were violently taken from their family and friends, and many were killed in remote locations known only to their killers. Victims' families were left destitute, with emotional wounds that will never heal.

Richard Falk criticised the trial, arguing that Western powers selectively prosecuted only war criminals who were opposed to Western interests. He also noted that the U.S. has refused the International Criminal Court jurisdiction over its citizens.

=== Contempt cases ===
The Court has opened two contempt cases. The first was opened in 2005 involved the alleged intimidation of a witness by Brima Samura, an investigator for the defense team in the AFRC case and wives of the defendants: Margaret Brima, Neneh Jalloh, Esther Kamara, and Anifa Kamara. Samura was acquitted, but all the other defendants were sentenced to one year of probation.

The second case was opened in 2011 and involved witness tampering, interference with the administration of justice, and other allegations against Brima Kamara and Santigie Kanu, who at the time had already been sentenced for the previous case against them, and Hassan Bangura, Samuel Kargbo, and Eric Senessie. At a July 2011 preliminary hearing, Kargbo entered a guilty plea; the other four defendants pleaded not guilty. In June 2012, Eric Senessie was tried and convicted of eight counts of contempt of court. He was sentenced the following month to two years' incarceration per count, with each sentence to run concurrently.

Kamara, Kanu, and Bangura were also tried in June 2012. In September 2012, they were convicted of contempt of court. Kanu and Bangura were convicted of two counts of "interfering with the administration of justice by offering a bribe to a witness" and for attempting to induce a witness who had given testimony before the special court to recant. Kamara was convicted for attempting to induce a witness to recant testimony he had previously given as well. In October 2012, Kargbo, Kamara, Kanu, and Bangura were sentenced to prison terms ranging from 18 months (suspended for Kargbo) to 2 years on contempt charges stemming from allegations of witness tampering.

In 2012, Charles Taylor's lead defense counsel, Courtenay Griffiths, was accused of disclosing the identities of protected witnesses. The Court ultimately found him not guilty.

In October 2012, a seventh defendant, Prince Taylor, was charged with nine counts of contempt of court for witness tampering and interference with the administration of justice. In October 2013, an Appeals Chamber panel overturned his initial conviction in a 2–1 ruling.

== Judgments ==
=== AFRC ===
On 20 June 2007, the three suspects in the Armed Forces Revolutionary Council trial, Brima, Kanu, and Kamara, were each convicted of eleven of 14 counts. These were acts of terrorism; collective punishments; extermination; murder—a crime against humanity; murder—a war crime; rape; outrages upon personal dignity; physical violence—a war crime; conscripting or enlisting children under the age of 15 years into armed forces or groups, or using them to participate actively in hostilities; enslavement; and pillage. They were found not guilty of three counts: sexual slavery and any other form of sexual violence; other inhumane act—forced marriage; and other inhumane acts—a crime against humanity.

These were the first judgments from the SCSL, as well as the first time ever that an international court ruled on charges related to child soldiers or forced marriage, and the first time an international court delivered a guilty verdict for the military conscription of children.

On 19 July 2007, Alex Tamba Brima and Santigie Borbor Kanu were sentenced to 50 years in jail, while Brima Kamara was sentenced to 45 years' imprisonment.

On 22 February 2008, the Appeals Chamber denied their appeal and reaffirmed the verdicts.

=== CDF ===
On 2 August 2007, the two surviving CDF defendants, Kondewa and Fofana, were convicted of murder, cruel treatment, pillage and collective punishments. Kondewa was further found guilty of use of child soldiers. The CDF trial was perhaps the most controversial as many Sierra Leoneans considered the CDF to be protecting them from the depredations of the RUF.

On 9 October 2007, the Court decided on the punishment. Kondewa was sentenced to eight years' imprisonment, Fofana got six years. These sentences were considered a success for the defence as the prosecutors had asked for 30 years' imprisonment for both. The Court imposed a lesser sentence because it saw some mitigating factors. These included the CDF's efforts to restore Sierra Leone's democratically elected government which, the Trial Chamber noted, "contributed immensely to re-establishing the rule of law in this Country where criminality, anarchy and lawlessness (...) had become the order of the day".

On appellate judgements announced on 28 May 2008, the Appeals Chamber overturned convictions of both defendants on the collective punishments charge as well as Kondewa's conviction for the use of child soldiers. However, the Appeals Chamber also entered new convictions against both for murder and inhumane acts as crimes against humanity. The Appeals Chamber also enhanced the sentences against the two, with the result that Fofana will serve 15 years and Kondewa will serve 20 years.

=== RUF ===
On 25 February 2009, convictions of each of the three RUF defendants were handed down. Issa Sesay and Morris Kallon were each found guilty on 16 of the 18 counts on which they had been charged. Augustine Gbao was found guilty of 14 of the 18 charges. Convictions were entered on charges including murder, enlistment of child soldiers, amputation, sexual slavery and forced marriage. The three were all convicted on charges of forced marriage, the first such convictions ever handed down in an international criminal court. All three had pleaded not guilty and shook their heads as the judgment was read. Sentences were handed down on 8 April 2009. Sesay received 52 years, Kallon 40 years and Gbao 25 years. The convictions and sentences were appealed and, on 26 October 2009, the Appeals Chamber handed down an opinion denying that appeal.

=== Charles Taylor ===
On 26 April 2012, Charles Taylor was convicted on all 11 counts with which he remained charged. He was previously acquitted of ordering war crimes and of joint conspiracy. On 30 May 2012, he was sentenced to a term of 50 years in prison.

== Monitoring Reports ==
The Special Court for Sierra Leone Monitoring Reports is a collection of reports of court proceedings written and researched by trial monitors from the University of California, Berkeley's War Crimes Studies Center stationed at the special court. The reports are available on-line through the Center's website. The monitors issued weekly reports on the trials, as well as special reports on various aspects of the justice process, including the treatment of charges of sexual violence, child witnesses, and the Defense Office.

== See also ==
- Rule of Law in Armed Conflicts Project (RULAC)
