= Lussick =

Lussick is a surname. Notable people with the surname include:

- Darcy Lussick (born 1989), Australian rugby league player
- Freddy Lussick (born 2000), New Zealander rugby league player
- Joey Lussick (born 1995), Australian rugby league player
- Richard Lussick (born 1940), Samoan judge
