= George Gelaga King =

Sierra Leonean academic

- Born: George Gelaga King; 29 October 1932; Zaire
- Died: 5 April 2016 (aged 83); Freetown, Sierra Leone
- Education: University of London
- Occupations: Judge, Ambassador, Academic, lawyer

George Gelaga King (29 October 1932 - 5 April 2016) was a judge in Sierra Leone, West Africa, and recently a justice of the Special Court for Sierra Leone.

== Early life and education ==
George Gelaga King was born in Zaire to Sierra Leonean parents from the Creole ethnic group who were settled in the then Belgian Congo. King was subsequently educated at local schools in Freetown and at the University of London.

== Early career ==
King was President of the Sierra Leone Court of Appeal and of the Court of Appeal of The Gambia. He served as Sierra Leone’s Ambassador to France, Spain, Portugal and Switzerland from 1974 to 1978, and was at the same time Sierra Leone’s Permanent Representative to UNESCO. Between 1978 and 1980 he served as Sierra Leone’s Ambassador and Permanent Representative to the United Nations.

King taught law at the Sierra Leone Law School from 1990 to 2005. He was Chairman of both the Sierra Leone Law Journal and the Gambian National Council for Law Reporting, and was a member of the Sierra Leone Council of Legal Education. He was a Fellow of the Royal Society of Arts.

== Judge of the Special Court for Sierra Leone, 2002-16 ==
King was a Judge of the Special Court for Sierra Leone from December 2002 alongside other justices such as John Bankole Thompson. He was president of the court from 2006 to 2008, at the Hague World Court being elected to two one-year terms. The Appeals Court Judges also selected Justice Emmanuel Ayoola of Nigeria as Vice-President at the same time that King was re-elected. He succeeded Justice Renate Winter of Austria.

In September 2013, King served as the presiding judge when the tribunal ruled that the Liberian ex-president Charles Taylor lost his appeal against a war-crimes conviction and instead confirmed his 50-year jail term for encouraging rebels in Sierra Leone to mutilate, rape and murder victims in its civil war.

He subsequently served on the Roster of Judges of the Residual Special Court. He was honored at Princeton by African Student organization.
