= Augustine Gbao =

Sierra Leonean paramilitary commander

- Born: 13 August 1948 (age 78); Blama, Kenema, British Sierra Leone
- Political party: Revolutionary United Front

Augustine Gbao (born 13 August 1948), also spelled as Augustine Bao, is a former paramilitary commander of the Revolutionary United Front (RUF) in the Sierra Leone Civil War. In February 2009, he was convicted of war crimes and crimes against humanity by the Special Court for Sierra Leone and sentenced to 25 years in prison. He was a senior commander in the RUF from 1991 until his capture in 2002.

After serving time in Rwanda for war crimes since 2009, Gbao was returned to Blama on 23 December 2020 to serve the remainder of his 25-year sentence.

== Early life ==
Augustine Gbao was born on 13 August 1948 in Blama, Kenema District, Sierra Leone. Before becoming involved with the rebel movement, he served as a member of the Sierra Leone Police from 1981 to 1986. After leaving the police force, he later joined the rebel group known as the Revolutionary United Front (RUF) in Liberia in 1991 during the early stages of the Sierra Leone Civil War.

== Career ==
Within the RUF, Gbao rose through the ranks and held several senior positions. He served as commander of the RUF Internal Defence Unit, where he oversaw the movement’s security units. From 1996 he operated as a senior commander in Kailahun District, and between 1998 and 2002 he served as the Overall Security Commander of the joint AFRC/RUF forces. In that role he was responsible for intelligence and security operations within the rebel movement.

He also served as joint commander of AFRC/RUF forces in the Makeni area between 1999 and 2002. During the civil war, the RUF was accused of widespread abuses against civilians, including killings, sexual violence, forced labour, and attacks on humanitarian workers and peacekeepers.

== Trial and Conviction ==
Gbao was indicted by the Special Court for Sierra Leone on 16 April 2003 and arrested the same day. His trial was conducted jointly with two other senior RUF leaders, Issa Hassan Sesay and Morris Kallon. The trial began in July 2004 in Freetown.

On 25 February 2009, the court found Gbao guilty on multiple counts of war crimes and crimes against humanity, including murder, acts of terrorism, rape, sexual slavery, forced marriage, enslavement, pillage, and attacks against United Nations peacekeepers. He was acquitted on several other charges, including the use of child soldiers.

He was sentenced to 25 years imprisonment. The Appeals Chamber later upheld the conviction and sentence.

Following his conviction, Gbao was transferred to Mpanga Prison in Rwanda to serve his sentence. In 2020, the Residual Special Court for Sierra Leone granted him conditional early release, allowing him to return to his home community in Blama under strict supervision. As part of the conditions, he was required to publicly apologise to the victims of his crimes and comply with restrictions on travel, political activity, and contact with former combatants.
