= Issa Sesay =

Military officer in Sierra Leone rebel group

- Born: June 27, 1970 (age 56); Freetown, Sierra Leone
- Political party: Revolutionary United Front, AFRC/RUF
- Convictions: Crime against humanity: terrorizing civilians; collective punishments; unlawful killings; sexual violence; physical violence; use of child soldiers; abductions and forced labor
- Penalty: 52 years imprisonment

Issa Hassan Sesay (born June 27, 1970) served as senior military officer and commander in the Revolutionary United Front and AFRC/RUF forces in their insurrection against the government of Sierra Leone. He was said to be subordinate only to Sam Bockarie, the Battlefield Commander, and Johnny Paul Koroma, leader of the AFRC.

Sesay is known as the commander who ordered the disarmament of the RUF, effectively ending the Sierra Leone Civil War.

On 7 March 2003 he was indicted by the Special Court for Sierra Leone for crimes against humanity and other war crimes, including terrorizing civilians, collective punishments, unlawful killings, crimes against humanity, sexual violence, physical violence, use of child soldiers, abductions and forced labor, looting and burning, and attacks on UNAMSIL personnel. He pleaded not guilty at his initial court appearance. On 25 February 2009 Sesay was convicted for 16 out of the 18 charges he faced at the Special Court for Sierra Leone in Freetown. Along with former leaders Morris Kallon, who received 40 years, and Augustine Gbao, who received 25, Sesay was sentenced to concurrent terms on the charges, the longest being a 52-year sentence.

An award-winning documentary by Rebecca Richman Cohen released in 2010 titled War Don Don follows the rise and fall of the rebel leader.
