= Sobel (Sierra Leone) =

Term used to describe members of state armed forces rebelling against government

Sobel (portmanteau of soldier + rebel) is a term which has been used within the politics of Sierra Leone to refer to members of the army of Sierra Leone who committed rebel attacks. In 1997, members of the armed forces known as the Armed Forces Revolutionary Council (AFRC) staged a coup. The military, who had been fighting against rebel insurgents known as the Revolutionary United Front (RUF), joined forces with those rebels and turned their guns on the population, with considerable loss of life and numerous atrocities. However, the practice of military support to rebels predates that time as soldiers were involved in supplying guns and ammunition to rebels as early as 1993 and the word "sobel" appeared in common use from 1994.

Though the RUF’s public facade was opposition to the corrupt government, it rapidly became more of a group of bandits. In initially opposing the RUF, the military carried out numerous atrocities against civilians in rebel areas, incurring the population's hatred. According to Feldman and Arrous, this further lowered morale among the soldiers and this, combined with low government rations, convinced the soldiers, who were called "sobels" ("soldiers by day - rebels by night") by the affected villagers, to join the rebels. This was also the time of fighting over blood diamonds, when it became lucrative to appear to be serving as soldiers while at the same time exploiting the mineral resources. The quality and discipline of the army had declined after 1991, when it was expanded from 3,000 to 16,000 men in order to combat the RUF, with those recruited not being properly screened and having "no sense of direction, ambition, discipline, or loyalty".

Though Sierra Leone is where the “sobel” neologism originated, similar situations may be observed in other parts of Africa. For example, Feldman and Arrous highlight the role of Tuareg fighters in Mali and Niger. Peace treaties to end Tuareg rebellions have sometimes integrated the former rebels into national armies. On occasions, these rebels became disenchanted with the army, resulting in their deserting and returning to being rebels.
