= Shireen Avis Fisher =

American lawyer

Justice Shireen Avis Fisher is a justice of the Residual Special Court for Sierra Leone, having been appointed to the role in October 2013 following the ad hoc tribunal's dissolution that year and having previously served as an Appeals Judge on the court from 2009 to 2013 and as President from 2012 to 2013. Previous to this appointment, Fisher served as an International Judge (War Crimes Chamber) of the Court of Bosnia and Herzegovina.

An American citizen, Fisher practiced law in both Washington, D.C., and the state of Vermont. She was appointed a Superior Court Judge of the state of Vermont in 1986, the second woman to be appointed to the Vermont judiciary. She holds a J.D. from Catholic University of America, an LL.M (Human Rights Law) from University College London and is a graduate of Hobart and William Smith Colleges, New York, in History. She replaced A. Raja N. Fernando on the Special Court for Sierra Leone, following his death in November 2007.
