= Binta Mansaray =

Sierra Leonean human rights advocate

Binta Mansaray, COR, is a Sierra Leonean human rights advocate and activist, who was appointed Registrar of the Special Court for Sierra Leone (SCSL) by the United Nations Secretary-General in September 2014. She had served as Acting Registrar since June 2009 and was previously Deputy Registrar of the SCSL from July 2007. In 2012, she was one of the women whose "historic" leadership at the helm of the SCSL was highlighted, "with all of its four Principals being women—a first in the history of international tribunals." In 2022, she was the recipient of the National Reconciliation Award, which honours an individual who has made a consistent contribution to transitional justice or human rights in Sierra Leone.

Born in Sierra Leone, Mansaray is a graduate of the University of Sierra Leone and has a master's degree in French from Fordham University in New York, as well as a master's degree in Public Administration and Policy from the American University in Washington, DC.

== Honours and recognition ==
In 2014, Mansaray was appointed Commander of the Order of the Rokel (COR), in recognition of her distinguished service to the Special Court for Sierra Leone.

In July 2022, she was the recipient of the National Reconciliation Award is, an initiative of the Center for Memory and Reparations honouring "an outstanding Sierra Leonean who has made significant contributions, and stood firm in the struggle for transitional justice, human rights, and national reconciliation in Sierra Leone for a minimum of 10 years".
