= Lomé Peace Agreement =

1999 accord ending the Sierra Leone Civil War

The Lomé Peace Agreement was a peace agreement signed on 7 July 1999 between the warring parties in the civil war that gripped Sierra Leone for almost a decade. President Ahmad Tejan Kabbah signed with the Revolutionary United Front (RUF) leader, Foday Sankoh and granted Sankoh a position in the transitional government as well as amnesty for him and all combatants. The accord is named for Lomé, the capital of Togo, where the negotiations took place and the agreement was signed.

== Context ==
The conflict had been dragging on since a RUF coup attempt against Kabbah in 1997. Sierra Leonean politicians at home and abroad were ready to negotiate with the rebels, including Omrie Golley and Pallo Bangura (AFRC/RUF junta's "foreign minister"). At the same time, President Kabbah was worn down from the fighting, the coup attempt, the siege of Freetown (Sierra Leone's capital), and the weakening support of the Nigerians in ECOMOG, a peacekeeping force in the country. Kabbah wanted peace, and was willing to make sacrifices. Sankoh wanted power, and was willing to fight for it. On 18 May, in the presence of United States special envoy Jesse Jackson and Togolese president Gnassingbé Eyadéma, Kabbah and Sankoh signed an initial cease-fire in Lomé. As a result, Sankoh, along with a negotiation team consisting of field commanders and allies, went to Lomé for negotiations with Kabbah's delegation, headed by Attorney General Solomon Berewa. After delays, the negotiations began in Lomé on 26 May.

== Negotiations ==
The RUF wanted a four-year Transitional Government to be formed with Sankoh as its vice president. Berewa conceded some seats for RUF members in the transitional government and that the RUF could form a political party in elections to be held in 2001 but would not grant the vice-presidency. Four cabinet posts and four deputy-ministerial positions were eventually granted to the RUF, subject to approval by the Parliament of Sierra Leone, and on the RUF side, on the agreement of senior rebel commander Sam Bockarie, as well as some other field commanders.

A RUF team headed by People's War Council chairman Soloman Y. B. Rogers returned to Sierra Leone to garner the support of rebel command. Bockarie pushed for more seats but rescinded after Charles Taylor intervened. Finally, Kabbah and Sankoh signed the agreement in Lomé on 7 July 1999. The Parliament unanimously ratified the accord on 16 July.

== Contents of the agreement ==
The Lomé Peace Agreement contained thirty-seven articles and five annexes. It was largely a rehash of the Abidjan Peace Accord. It included commitments to end hostilities, reestablish the Commission for the Consolidation of Peace, provide for demobilization and disarmament, and aid in the reintegration of combatants into civil society. It also granted amnesty to Sankoh and all rebel combatants (Article IX) and allowed for the RUF to become a political party. To achieve these goals, it called for the UN observer Mission in Sierra Leone (UNAMSIL) and ECOMOG to form a neutral peacekeeping force, and all mercenaries to leave the country, as well as a creation of a new Sierra Leone Army.

Sankoh was offered chairmanship of the Commission for the Management of Strategic Resources, National Reconstruction, and Development (Article V), which was to have the status of vice president, answerable only to the president.

== Aftermath of the agreement ==
Immediately after the signing of the agreement, thousands of civilians and rebels made their way into the cities from the countryside searching for food and overwhelming aid agencies capabilities. However, with government hired mercenaries (especially Executive Outcomes) out of the country, the second highest member of the RUF, Sam Bockarie, refused to disarm. Rebel activity continued (notably that of new group, the West Side Boys), and Freetown was again under siege by May 2000. Disarmament of rebel forces finally began in earnest in May 2001.

== Criticism ==
The granting of amnesty was highly objectionable from the perspective of the UN. United Nations High Commissioner for Human Rights, Mary Robinson, instructed UN representative Francis Okelo not to sign the agreement. However, Okelo was able to convince the UN that his signature was necessary for peace, and he signed with the caveat that the UN would not recognize amnesty for acts of genocide, crimes against humanity, war crimes, and other serious violations of international humanitarian law, as per the request of the United Nations Security Council.

== See also ==
- Amnesty law
- Command responsibility
