= Giuseppe Berton =

Berton in 2010

Father Giuseppe Berton (1932 – 25 June 2013) was an Italian missionary of the Catholic Church, a member of the Xaverian Missionary Fathers, who worked in Sierra Leone from 1971 until his death.

== Biography ==
Born in Marostica, Vicenza, on 5 February 1932. He was the founder of the Family Homes Movement (FHM) which provided parental care and education to children in particular need; during the civil war, Berton and FHM saved and rehabilitated into social life more than 3000 child soldiers.

Berton is the central figure of the documentary La Vita Non Perde Valore (Life does not lose its value), for which the director Wilma Massucco was awarded the 2014 Maria Rita Saulle Award.

With Roberto Ravera, Director ASL 1 Imperiese, Italy, Berton co-founded the FHM ITALIA Onlus, the Italian counterpart of FHM Sierra Leone, which applies the latest scientific theories in psychology and psychopathology to the rehabilitation and social integration of abandoned children.

Berton died on 25 June 2013 at the mother house of the Xaverians in Parma.

== Documentaries ==
- DVD Life does not lose its value (Original title, Italian language, La vita non perde valore), by Wilma Massucco (ITA/ENG - 53' - Bluindaco Productions © 2012): it focuses, ten years after the war ending, on the reintegration, led by Father Giuseppe Berton, of former child soldiers, after they lived for long in the forest, together with the rebels of the RUF, Revolutionary United Front of Sierra Leone. Main focus of the Documentary: is it possible to overcome suffering, even when it is huge and deep like child soldiers' one? If so, in which way? The documentary has been analyzed in different Universities, becoming subject of various degree thesis.
- Dvd Infanzia rubata, bambini soldato, child soldiers in Sierra Leone (ITA - Videomission © 2000), directed by Fiorenzo Raffaini

== Contributions to other Documentaries ==
- Father Giuseppe Berton is one of the persons interviewed in the 2000 Documentary Film Cry Freetown, by Sorious Samura. The Film was produced with the assistance of CNN Productions and Insight News Television. Some of the baby soldiers interviewed by Sorious Samura in Cry Freetown and recovered by Father Berton are the same interviewed, in 2012, ten years later, in the Documentary Life does not lose its value.
- He has been many times subject of Italian National TV Channel. See for example: RAI TV Channel 3, Agenda del Mondo, puntata del 12 Nov 2011 and Raffaella Carrà and Antonello Venditti RAI 1, Amore, 2006
