= La vita non perde valore =

- Directed by: Wilma Massucco
- Narrated by: Francesca Iacoviello
- Cinematography: Wilma Massucco
- Edited by: Alberto Boni
- Music by: Samba Mapangala and Occidental Brothers Dance Band; Alexander Khaskin; Steven Loxford
- Release date: February 23, 2012
- Running time: 53 minutes
- Country: Italy
- Languages: Italian, English

La vita non perde valore (Italian: Life does not lose its value) is a 2012 Italian documentary film about the reintegration into society of former child soldiers in Sierra Leone. The documentary has been analyzed in different Universities, becoming subject of five degree thesis.

It was written and directed by Wilma Massucco, a filmmaker and freelance journalist who was awarded of an Italian National Award on Human Rights, i.e. 2014 Maria Rita Saulle Award).

The film focuses on the work of Father Giuseppe Berton, an Italian Missionary who lived in Sierra Leone for over forty years. Berton founded the "Family Homes Movement" (FHM) to provide parental care and education to child victims of the country's civil war, during which thousands of children were recruited and used as soldiers by all sides. Children were often forcibly recruited, given drugs and used to commit atrocities. Girls were also recruited as soldiers and often subjected to sexual exploitation. Many of the children were survivors of village attacks, while others were found abandoned. They were used for patrol purposes, attacking villages, and guarding workers in the diamond fields. FHM has rehabilitated more than 3000 child soldiers back into society.

The film features the testimonies of some of these former child soldiers — now adults — relating their experiences both before and after their meeting with Berton, and explores issues of guilt, loneliness, trust and fear, and how the subjects were helped to overcome the suffering and seemingly negative values of their past. The film's underpinning theme is that despite the civil war and the abuse of these child soldiers "life does not lose value." The film also shows how Berton's work allows both victims and perpetrators of the violence to now meet and cooperate without hatred or resentment because of this trust in the value of life. The film is "hard and painful" but the message is "one of hope, despite the fear, the nightmare, despite the wickedness and baseness of man." It intersperses the testimonies with interviews and discussion with Berton and Roberto Ravera, a psychologist working alongside FHM to analyze the effect of trauma in child soldiers.

The film was shot during 2010 and conceived after Massucco was approached by EUGAD — a European Commission funded project to "create, collect and distribute knowledge resources for improving communication and dialogue" — to produce a series of interviews in Sierra Leone. After Wilma Massucco met Father Berton, she was invited by him to make a reportage on his activity with the former child soldiers of Sierra Leone. La vita non perde valore is the documentary that came out, it is a focus "[not] on the human drama, but how it was dealt with and resolved."

Premiered in 2012, the film was also released in an English-language version the same year.

== See also ==
- Sierra Leone Civil War
- Military use of children
- A Long Way Gone: Memoirs of a Boy Soldier
