= Sierra Leone Civil War =

1991–2002 war in West Africa

- Part of the West African Crisis and spillover of the First and Second Liberian Civil Wars
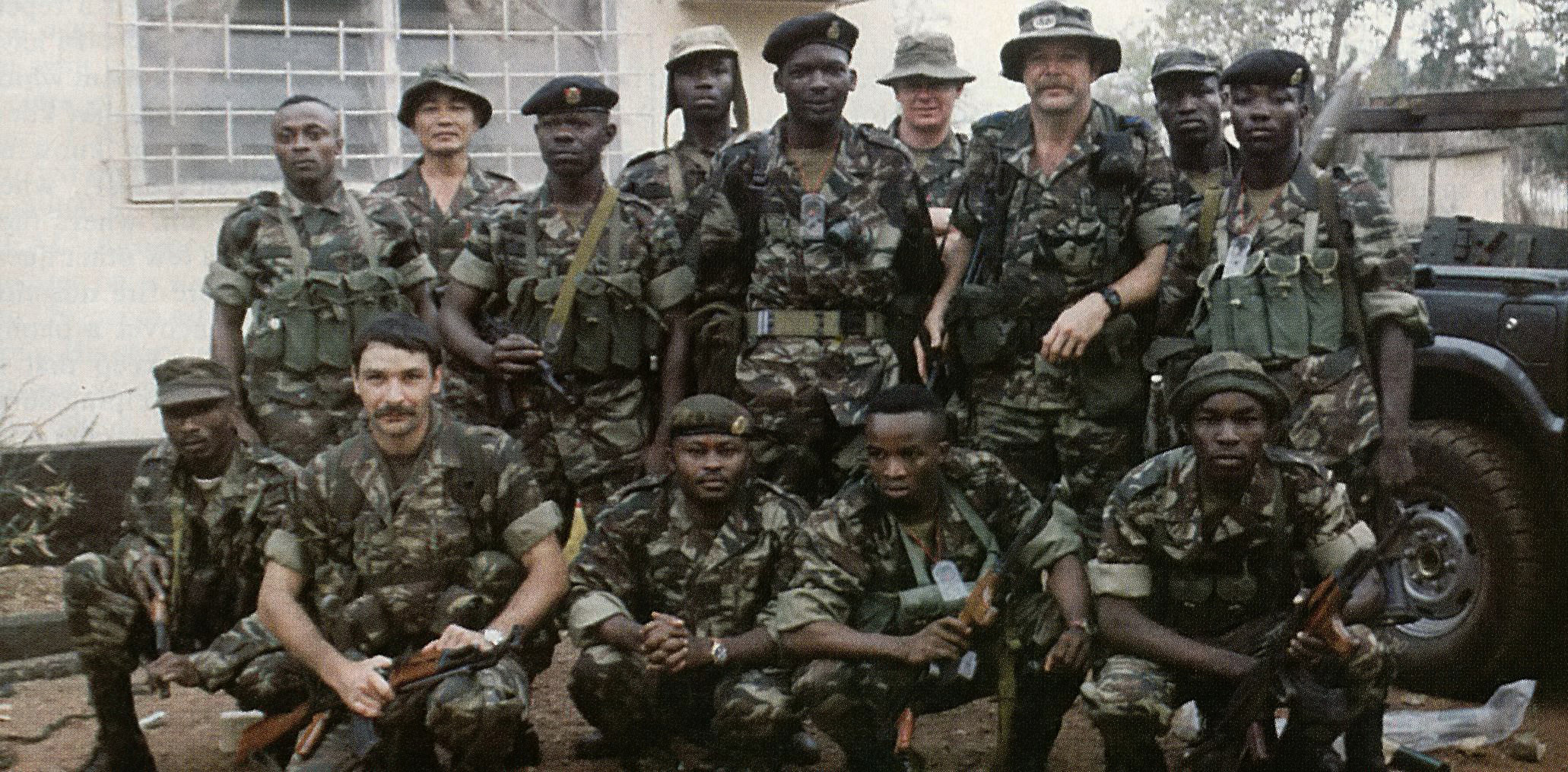
- SLA soldiers and mercenaries
Date	23 March 1991 – 18 January 2002; (10 years, 9 months, 3 weeks and 5 days)
Location	Sierra Leone
Result	Commonwealth victory

Belligerents
Sierra Leone; SLA (before and after the AFRC); CDF (Kamajors, Tamaboros, Kapras, etc.); Foreign mercenaries; United Kingdom (2000–2002); Guinea; ECOMOG forces (1998–2000); Executive Outcomes (1995–1996); Supported by: United States; Belarus; (United Nations) UNAMSIL; Bangladesh; India; Pakistan (2001–2005); Kenya; Russia (1999–2005); Ukraine (1999–2005); Nigeria; Norway; New Zealand; Ghana; Jordan; Germany	Liberated Zone; RUF; (Sierra Leone) AFRC (1997–2002); West Side Boys (1998–2000); Liberia (1997–2002); Greater Liberia (1991–1997); NPFL (1991–1996); Foreign mercenaries; Supported by: Libya; Burkina Faso; Senegal

Commanders and leaders
(Sierra Leone) Joseph Saidu Momoh; (Sierra Leone) Valentine Strasser; (Sierra Leone) Julius Maada Bio; (Sierra Leone) Ahmad Tejan Kabbah; (Sierra Leone) Samuel Hinga Norman; (Sierra Leone) Yahya Kanu; (Sierra Leone) Solomon Musa; (Sierra Leone) Moinina Fofana; (Sierra Leone) Allieu Kondewa; (United Kingdom) Tony Blair; (United Kingdom) David Richards; (Guinea) Lansana Conté; (Nigeria) Maxwell Khobe; (United Nations) (India) Vijay Jetley; (United Nations) (Kenya) Daniel Opande	Foday Sankoh; Sam Bockarie; Issa Sesay; Augustine Gbao; (Sierra Leone) Johnny Paul Koroma; (Sierra Leone) Foday Kallay; (Liberia) Charles Taylor; (Liberia) Benjamin Yeaten

Strength
(Sierra Leone) ~4,000 government soldiers and militiamen (1999); ECOMOG: ~700 Nigerian soldiers; (United Nations) 6,000 UNAMSIL soldiers, 260 military observers, 4 Russian Mil Mi-24s (1999); (United Kingdom) ~4,500 deployed into theatre (1,300 ashore)	~20,000 rebels (1999)

Casualties and losses
- 50,000 to 70,000< deaths; 2.5 million displaced internally and externally

The Sierra Leone Civil War (1991–2002) was a civil war in Sierra Leone that began on 23 March 1991 when the Revolutionary United Front (RUF), with support from the special forces of Liberian dictator Charles Taylor, the National Patriotic Front of Liberia (NPFL), intervened in Sierra Leone in an attempt to overthrow the Joseph Momoh government. The resulting civil war lasted almost 11 years, and had over 50,000, up to 70,000, casualties in total; an estimated 2.5 million people were displaced during the conflict, and widespread atrocities occurred.

During the first year of the war, the RUF took control of large swathes of territory in eastern and southern Sierra Leone, which were rich in alluvial diamonds. The government's ineffective response to the RUF and the disruption in government diamond production precipitated a military coup d'état in April 1992, organized by the National Provisional Ruling Council (NPRC). By the end of 1993, the Sierra Leone Army (SLA) had succeeded in pushing the RUF rebels back to the Liberian border, but the RUF recovered and fighting continued. In March 1995, Executive Outcomes (EO), a South Africa-based private military company, was hired to repel the RUF. Sierra Leone installed an elected civilian government in March 1996, and the retreating RUF signed the Abidjan Peace Accord. Under UN pressure, the government terminated its contract with EO before the accord could be implemented, and hostilities recommenced.

In May 1997, a group of disgruntled SLA officers staged a coup and established the Armed Forces Revolutionary Council (AFRC) as the new government of Sierra Leone. The RUF joined with the AFRC to capture the capital city, Freetown, with little resistance. The new government, led by Johnny Paul Koroma, declared the war over. A wave of looting, rape, and murder followed the announcement. Reflecting international dismay at the overturning of the civilian government, Economic Community of West African States Monitoring Group (ECOMOG) forces intervened and retook Freetown on behalf of the government, but they found the outlying regions more difficult to pacify.

In January 1999, world leaders intervened diplomatically to promote negotiations between the RUF and the government. The Lome Peace Accord, signed on 27 March 1999, was the result. Lome gave Foday Sankoh, the commander of the RUF, the vice presidency and control of Sierra Leone's diamond mines in return for a cessation of the fighting and the deployment of a UNAMSIL peacekeeping force to monitor the disarmament process. RUF compliance with the disarmament process was inconsistent and sluggish, and by May 2000, the rebels were advancing again upon Freetown.

As the UN mission began to fail, the United Kingdom declared its intention to intervene in the former colony and Commonwealth member in an attempt to support the severely weak government of President Ahmad Tejan Kabbah. With help from a renewed UN mandate and Guinean air support, the British Operation Palliser finally defeated the RUF, retaking control of Freetown. On 18 January 2002, President Kabbah declared the Sierra Leone Civil War over.

== Causes of the war ==
=== Political history ===
In 1961, Sierra Leone gained its independence from the United Kingdom. In the years following the death of Sierra Leone's first prime minister Sir Milton Margai in 1964, politics in the country were increasingly characterized by corruption, mismanagement, and electoral violence that led to a weak civil society, the collapse of the education system, and, by 1991, an entire generation of dissatisfied youth were attracted to the rebellious message of the Revolutionary United Front (RUF) and joined the organization. Albert Margai, unlike his half-brother Milton, did not see the state as a steward of the public, but instead as a tool for personal gain and self-aggrandizement and even used the military to suppress multi-party elections that threatened to end his rule.

When Siaka Stevens entered politics in 1968, Sierra Leone was a constitutional democracy. When he stepped down, seventeen years later, Sierra Leone was a one-party state. Stevens' rule, sometimes called "the 17 year plague of locusts", saw the destruction and perversion of every state institution. Parliament was undermined, judges were bribed, and the treasury was bankrupted to finance pet projects that supported insiders. When Stevens failed to co-opt his opponents, he often resorted to state sanctioned executions or exile.

In 1985, Stevens stepped down, and handed the nation's preeminent position to Major General Joseph Momoh, who inherited a destroyed economy but was regarded as mostly successful in rooting out corruption and graft within his government. With the state unable to pay its civil servants, those desperate enough ransacked and looted government offices and property. Even in Freetown, important commodities like gasoline were scarce. But the government hit rock bottom when it could no longer pay schoolteachers and the education system collapsed. Since only wealthy families could afford to pay private tutors, the bulk of Sierra Leone's youth during the late 1980s roamed the streets aimlessly. As infrastructure and public ethics deteriorated in tandem, much of Sierra Leone's professional class fled the country. By 1991, Sierra Leone was ranked as one of the poorest countries in the world, even though it benefited from ample natural resources including diamonds, gold, bauxite, rutile, iron ore, fish, coffee, and cocoa.

=== Diamonds and the "resource curse" ===
The Eastern and Southern districts in Sierra Leone, most notably the Kono and Kenema districts, are rich in alluvial diamonds, and more importantly, are easily accessible by anyone with a shovel, sieve, and transport. Since their discovery in the early 1930s, diamonds have been critical in financing the continuing pattern of corruption and personal aggrandizement at the expense of needed public services, institutions, and infrastructure. The phenomenon whereby countries with an abundance of natural resources tend to nonetheless be characterized by lower levels of economic development is known as the "resource curse".

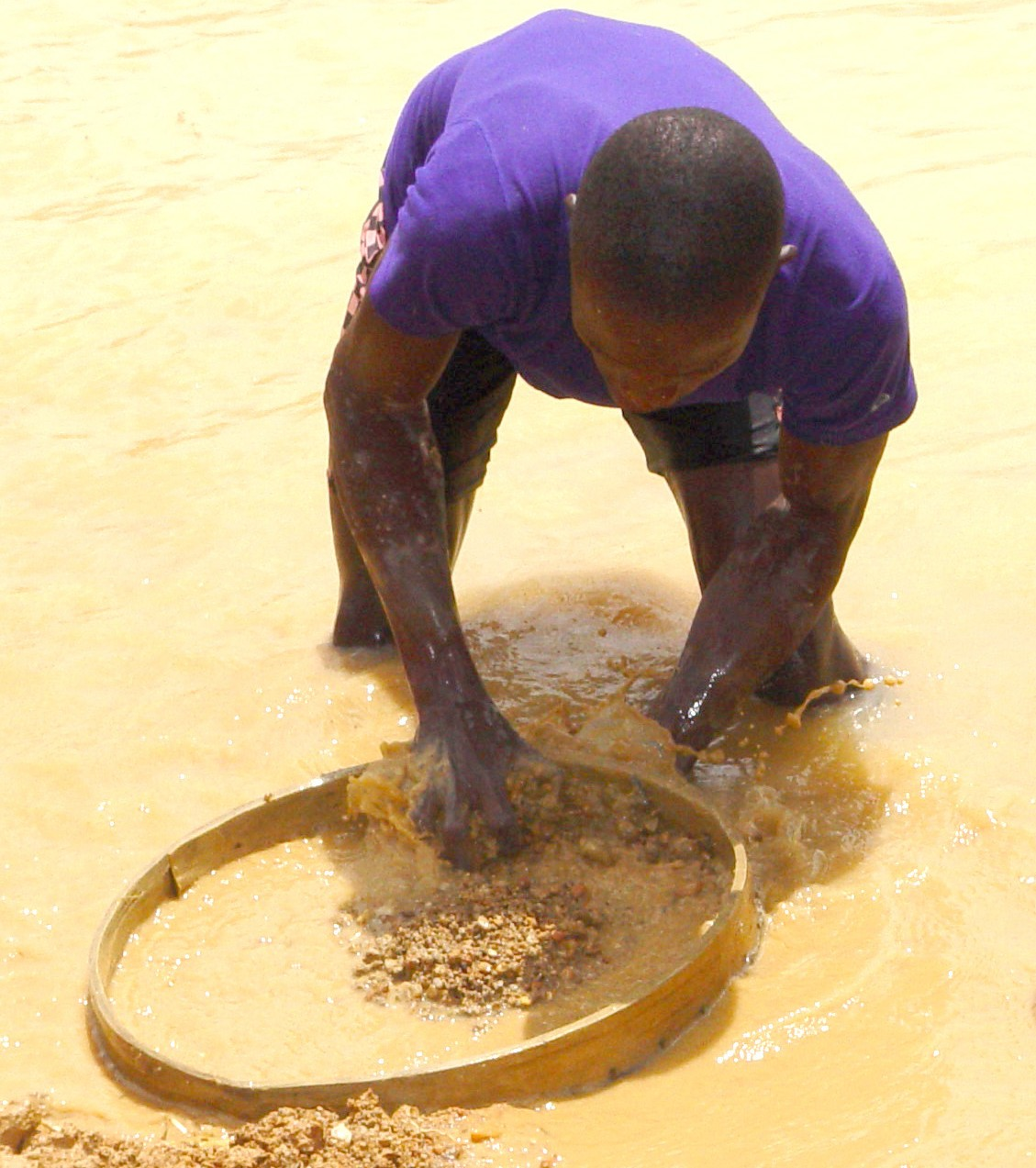
Alluvial diamond miner

The presence of diamonds in Sierra Leone invited and led to the civil war in several ways. First, the highly unequal benefits resulting from diamond mining made ordinary Sierra Leoneans frustrated. Under the Stevens government, revenues from the National Diamond Mining Corporation (known as DIMINCO) – a joint government/DeBeers venture – were used for the personal enrichment of Stevens and of members of the government and business elite who were close to him. when DeBeers pulled out of the venture in 1984, the government lost direct control of the diamond mining areas. By the late 1980s, almost all of Sierra Leone's diamonds were being smuggled and traded illicitly, with revenues going directly into the hands of private investors. In this period the diamond trade was dominated by Lebanese traders and later (after a shift in favor on the part of the Momoh government) by Israelis with connections to the international diamond markets in Antwerp. Momoh made some efforts to reduce smuggling and corruption in the diamond mining sector, but he lacked the political clout to enforce the law. Even after the National Provisional Ruling Council (NPRC) took power in 1992, ostensibly with the goal of reducing corruption and returning revenues to the state, high-ranking members of the government sold diamonds for their personal gain and lived extravagantly off the proceeds.

Diamonds also helped to arm the RUF rebels who used funds harvested from the alluvial diamond mines to purchase weapons and ammunition from neighbouring Guinea, Liberia, and even SLA soldiers. But the most significant connection between diamonds and war is that the presence of easily extractable diamonds provided an incentive for violence. To maintain control of important mining districts like Kono, thousands of civilians were expelled and kept away from these important economic centers.

Although diamonds were a significant motivating and sustaining factor, there were other means of profiting from the Sierra Leone Civil War. For instance, gold mining was prominent in some regions. Even more common was cash crop farming through the use of forced labor. Looting during the Sierra Leone Civil War did not just center on diamonds, but also included that of currency, household items, food, livestock, cars, and international aid shipments. For Sierra Leoneans who did not have access to arable land, joining the rebel cause was an opportunity to seize property through the use of deadly force. But the most important reason why the civil war should not be entirely attributed to conflict over the economic benefits incurred from the alluvial diamond mines is that the pre-war frustrations and grievances did not just concern that of the diamond sector. More than twenty years of poor governance, poverty, corruption and oppression created the circumstances for the rise of the RUF, as ordinary people yearned for change.

=== Demographics of rebel recruitment ===
As a result of the First Liberian Civil War, 80,000 refugees fled neighboring Liberia for the Sierra Leone – Liberian border. This displaced population, composed almost entirely of children, would prove to be an invaluable asset to the invading rebel armies because the refugee and detention centers, populated first by displaced Liberians and later by Sierra Leoneans, helped provide the manpower for the RUF's insurgency. The RUF took advantage of the refugees, who were abandoned, starving, and in dire need of medical attention, by promising food, shelter, medical care, and looting and mining profits in return for their support. When this method of recruitment failed, as it often did for the RUF, youths were often coerced at gunpoint to join the ranks of the RUF. After being forced to join, many child soldiers learned that the complete lack of law – as a result of the civil war – provided a unique opportunity for self-empowerment through violence and thus continued to support the rebel cause.

=== Libyan and arms dealing role ===
Muammar al-Gaddafi both trained and supported Charles Taylor. Gaddafi also helped Foday Sankoh, the founder of Revolutionary United Front.

Russian businessman Viktor Bout supplied Charles Taylor with arms for use in Sierra Leone and had meetings with him about the operations.

== Course of the war ==
=== SLA response and "Sobels" ===
The initial rebellion could have easily been quelled in the first half of 1991. But the RUF – despite being both numerically inferior and extremely brutal against civilians – controlled a significant portion of the country by the year's end. The SLA's equally poor behavior made this outcome possible. Often afraid to directly confront or unable to locate the elusive RUF, government soldiers were brutal and indiscriminate in their search for rebels or sympathizers among the civilian population. After retaking captured towns, the SLA would perform a 'mopping up' operation in which the towns people were transported to concentration camp styled 'strategic hamlets' far from their homes in Eastern and Southern Sierra Leone under the pretense of separating the population from the insurgents. However, in many cases, this was followed by much looting and theft after the villagers were evacuated.

==== Sobels ====
The SLA's sordid behavior inevitably led to the alienation of many civilians and pushed some Sierra Leoneans to join the rebel cause. With morale low and rations even lower, many SLA soldiers discovered that they could do better by joining with the rebels in looting civilians in the countryside instead of fighting against them. The local civilians referred to these soldiers as 'sobels' or 'soldiers by day, rebels by night' because of their close ties to the RUF. By mid-1993, the two opposing sides became virtually indistinguishable. For these reasons, civilians increasingly relied on an irregular force called the Kamajors for their protection.

=== Rise of the Kamajors ===
A grassroots militia force, the Kamajors operated invisibly in familiar territory and was a significant impediment to marauding government and RUF troops. For displaced and unprotected Sierra Leoneans, joining the Kamajors was a means of taking up arms to defend family and home due to the SLA's perceived incompetence and active collusion with the rebel enemy. The Kamajors clashed with both government and RUF forces and was instrumental in countering government soldiers and rebels who were looting villages. The success of the Kamajors raised calls for its expansion, and members of street gangs and deserters were also co-opted into the organization. However, the Kamajors became corrupt and deeply involved in extortion, murder, and kidnappings by the end of the conflict.

=== National Provisional Ruling Council ===
Within one year of fighting, the RUF offensive had stalled, but it still remained in control of large territories in Eastern and Southern Sierra Leone leaving many villages unprotected while also disrupting food and government diamond production. Soon the government was unable to pay both its civil servants and the SLA. As a result, the Momoh regime lost all remaining credibility and a group of disgruntled junior officers led by Captain Valentine Strasser overthrew Momoh on 29 April 1992. Strasser justified the coup and the establishment of the National Provisional Ruling Council (NPRC) by referencing the corrupt Momoh regime and its inability to resuscitate the economy, provide for the people of Sierra Leone, and repel the rebel invaders. The NPRC's coup was largely popular because it promised to bring peace to Sierra Leone. But the NPRC's promise would prove to be short lived.

In March 1993, with much help from ECOMOG troops provided by Nigeria, the SLA recaptured the Koidu and Kono diamond districts and pushed the RUF to the Sierra Leone – Liberia border. The RUF was facing supply problems as the United Liberation Movement of Liberia for Democracy (ULIMO) gains inside Liberia were restricting the ability of Charles Taylor's NPFL to trade with the RUF. By the end of 1993, many observers thought that the war was over because for the first time in the conflict the Sierra Leone Army was able to establish itself in the Eastern and the Southern mining districts.

However, with senior government officials neglectful of the conditions faced by SLA soldiers, front line soldiers became resentful of their poor conditions and began helping themselves to Sierra Leone's rich natural resources. This included alluvial diamonds as well as looting and 'sell game', a tactic in which government forces would withdraw from a town but not before leaving arms and ammunition for the roving rebels in return for cash. Renegade SLA soldiers even clashed with Kamajor units on a number of occasions when the Kamajors intervened to halt the looting and mining. The NPRC government also had a motivation for allowing the war to continue, since as long as the country was at war the military government would not be called upon to hand over rule to a democratically elected civilian government. The war dragged on as a low intensity conflict until January 1995 when RUF forces and dissident SLA elements seized the SIEROMCO (bauxite) and Sierra Rutile (titanium dioxide) mines in the Moyamba and Bonthe districts in the country's south west, furthering the government's economic struggles and enabling a renewed RUF advance on the capital at Freetown.

=== Executive Outcomes ===
In March 1995, with the RUF within twenty miles of Freetown, Executive Outcomes, a private military company from South Africa, arrived in Sierra Leone. The government paid EO $1.8 million per month (financed primarily by the International Monetary Fund), to accomplish three goals: return the diamond and mineral mines to the government, locate and destroy the RUF's headquarters, and operate a successful propaganda program that would encourage local Sierra Leoneans to support the government of Sierra Leone. EO's military force consisted of 500 military advisers and 3,000 highly trained and well-equipped combat-ready soldiers, backed by tactical air support and transport. Executive Outcomes employed black Angolans and Namibians from apartheid-era South Africa's former 32 Battalion, with an officer corps of white South Africans. Harper's Magazine described this controversial unit as a collection of former spies, assassins, and crack bush guerrillas, most of whom had served for fifteen to twenty years in South Africa's most notorious counter insurgency units.

Parliament after 1996 elections: Sierra Leone People's Party: 27 seats People's Democratic Party: 12 seats All People's Congress: 5 seats Other parties : 24 seats Indirectly elected paramount chiefs: 12 seats

As a military force, EO was remarkably effective and conducted a highly successful counter insurgency against the RUF. In just ten days of fighting, EO was able to drive the RUF forces back sixty miles into the interior of the country. EO outmatched the RUF forces in all operations. In just seven months, EO, with support from loyal SLA and the Kamajors battalions, recaptured the diamond mining districts and the Kangari Hills, a major RUF stronghold. A second offensive captured the provincial capital and the largest city in Sierra Leone and destroyed the RUF's main base of operations near Bo, finally forcing the RUF to admit defeat and sign the Abidjan Peace Accord in Abidjan, Côte d'Ivoire on 30 November 1996. This period of relative peace also allowed the country to hold parliamentary and presidential elections in February and March 1996. Ahmad Tejan Kabbah (of the Sierra Leone People's Party [SLPP]), a diplomat who had worked at the UN for more than 20 years, won the presidential election.

=== Abidjan Peace Accord ===
The Abidjan Peace Accord mandated that Executive Outcomes was to pull out within five weeks after the arrival of a neutral peacekeeping force. The main stumbling block that prevented Sankoh from signing the agreement sooner was the number and type of peacekeepers that were to monitor the ceasefire. Additionally, continued Kamajor attacks and the fear of punitive tribunals following demobilization kept many rebels in the bush despite their dire situation. However, in January 1997, the Kabbah government – beset by demands to reduce expenditures by the International Monetary Fund – ordered EO to leave the country, even though a neutral monitoring force had yet to arrive. The departure of EO opened up an opportunity for the RUF to regroup for renewed military attacks. The March 1997 arrest of RUF leader Foday Sankoh in Nigeria also angered RUF members, who reacted with escalated violence. By the end of March 1997, the peace accord had collapsed.

=== AFRC/RUF coup and interregnum ===
After the departure of Executive Outcomes, the credibility of the Kabbah government declined, especially among members of the SLA, who saw themselves being eclipsed by both the RUF on one side and the independent but pro-government Kamajors on the other. On 25 May 1997, a group of disgruntled SLA officers freed and armed 600 prisoners from the Pademba Road prison in Freetown. One of the prisoners, Major Johnny Paul Koroma, emerged as the leader of the coup and the Armed Forces Revolutionary Council (AFRC) proclaimed itself the new government of Sierra Leone. After receiving the blessing of Foday Sankoh, who was then living under house arrest in Nigeria, members of the RUF – supposedly on its last legs – were ordered out of the bush to participate in the coup. Without hesitation and encountering only light resistance from SLA loyalists, 5,000 rag-tag rebel fighters marched 100 miles and overran the capital. Without fear or reluctance, RUF and SLA dissidents then proceeded to parade peacefully together. Koroma then appealed to Nigeria for the release of Sankoh, appointing the absent leader to the position of deputy chairman of the AFRC. The joint AFRC/RUF leadership then proclaimed that the war had been won, and a great wave of looting and reprisals against civilians in Freetown (dubbed "Operation Pay Yourself" by some of its participants) followed. President Kabbah, surrounded only by his bodyguards, left by helicopter for exile in nearby Guinea.

The AFRC junta was opposed by organised members of Sierra Leone's civil society such as trade unions, journalists associations, women and students groups, and others, not only because of the violence it unleashed but because of its political attacks on press freedoms and civil rights. The international response to the coup was also overwhelmingly negative. (Note: "The AFRC remained a pariah junta, shunned by every government in the world.") The UN and the Organization of African Unity (OAU) condemned the coup, foreign governments withdrew their diplomats and missions (and in some cases evacuated civilians) from Freetown, and Sierra Leone's membership in the Commonwealth was suspended. The Economic Community of West African States (ECOWAS) also condemned the AFRC coup and demanded that the new junta return power peacefully to the Kabbah government or risk sanctions and increased military presence by ECOMOG forces.

ECOMOG's intervention in Sierra Leone brought the AFRC/RUF rebels to the negotiating table where, in October 1997, they agreed to a tentative peace known as the Conakry Peace Plan. Despite having agreed to the plan, the AFRC/RUF continued to fight. In March 1998, overcoming entrenched AFRC positions, the ECOMOG forces retook the capital and reinstated the Kabbah government, but let the rebels flee without further harassment. The regions lying just beyond Freetown proved much more difficult to pacify. Thanks in part to bad road conditions, lack of support aircraft, and a revenge driven rebel force, ECOMOG's offensive ground to a halt just outside Freetown. ECOMOG's forces suffered from several weakness, the most important being, poor command and control, low morale, inadequate counterinsurgency training, limited manpower, weak air and sea capability, and poor funding.

Unable to consistently defend itself against the AFRC/RUF rebels, the Kabbah regime was forced to make serious concessions in the Lome Peace Agreement of July 1999.

=== Lome peace agreement ===
Given that Nigeria was due to recall its ECOMOG forces without achieving a tactical victory over the RUF, the international community intervened diplomatically to promote negotiations between the AFRC/RUF rebels and the Kabbah regime. The Lome Peace Accord, signed on 7 July 1999, is controversial in that Sankoh was pardoned for treason, granted the position of Vice President, and made chairman of the commission that oversaw Sierra Leone's diamond mines. In return, the RUF was ordered to demobilize and disarm its armies under the supervision of an international peacekeeping force which would initially be under the authority of both ECOMOG and the United Nations. The Lome Peace Agreement was the subject of protests both in Sierra Leone and by international human rights groups abroad, mainly because it handed over to Sankoh, the commander of the brutal RUF, the second most powerful position in the country, and control over all of Sierra Leone's lucrative diamond mines.

==== DDR process ====
Following the Lome Peace Agreement, the security situation in Sierra Leone was still unstable because many rebels refused to commit themselves to the peace process. The Disarmament, Demobilization and Reintegration camps were an attempt to convince the rebel forces to literally exchange their weapons for food, clothing, and shelter. During a six-week quarantine period, former combatants were taught basic skills that could be put to use in a peaceful profession after they return to society. After 2001, DDR camps became increasingly effective and by 2002 they had collected over 45,000 weapons and hosted over 70,000 former combatants.

=== UNAMSIL intervention ===
In October 1999 the UN established the United Nations Mission to Sierra Leone (UNAMSIL). The main objective of UNAMSIL was to assist with the disarmament process and enforce the terms established under the Lome Peace Agreement. Unlike other previous neutral peacekeeping forces, UNAMSIL brought serious military power. The original multi-national force was commanded by General Vijay Jetley of India. Jetley later resigned and was replaced by Lieutenant General Daniel Opande of Kenya in November 2000. Jetley had accused Nigerian political and military officials at the top of the UN mission of "sabotaging peace" in favor of national interests, and alleged that Nigerian army commanders illegally mined diamonds in league with RUF. The Nigerian army called for General Jetley's resignation immediately after the report was released, saying they could no longer work with him.

UNAMSIL forces began arriving in Sierra Leone in December 1999. At that time the maximum number of troops to be deployed was set at 6,000. Only a few months later, though, in February 2000, a new UN resolution authorized the deployment of 11,000 combatants. In March 2001 that number was increased to 17,500 troops, making it at the time the largest UN force in existence, and UNAMSIL soldiers were deployed in the RUF-held diamond areas. Despite these numbers, UNAMSIL was frequently rebuffed and humiliated by RUF rebels, being subjected to attacks, obstruction and disarmament. In the most egregious example, in May 2000 over 500 UNAMSIL peacekeepers were captured by the RUF and held hostage. Using the weapons and armored personnel carriers of the captured UNAMSIL troops, the rebels advanced towards Freetown, taking over the town of Lunsar to its northeast. For over a year later, the UNAMSIL force meticulously avoided intervening in RUF controlled mining districts lest another major incident occur. After the UNAMSIL force had essentially rearmed the RUF, a call for a new military intervention was made to save the UNAMSIL hostages and the government of Sierra Leone. After Operation Palliser and Operation Khukri the situation stabilized and UNAMSIL gained control.

In late 1999, the UN Security Council asked Russia for participation in a peacekeeping mission in Sierra Leone. The Federation Council of Russia decided to send 4 Mil Mi-24 attack helicopters with 115 crew and technical personnel into Sierra Leone. Many of them had combat experience in Afghanistan and Chechnya. The destroyed Lungi civil airfield in the suburbs of Freetown became their base of operations. A Ukrainian Detached Recovery and Restoring Battalion, and aviation team were stationed near Freetown. The two post-Soviet troop contingents got along well, and left together after the UN mandate for peacekeeping operations ended in June 2005.

==== Operation Khukri ====
Operation Khukri was a unique multinational operation launched in the United Nations Assistance Mission in Sierra Leone (UNAMSIL), involving India, Nepal, Ghana, Britain and Nigeria. The aim of the operation was to break the two-month-long siege laid by armed cadres of the RUF around two companies of 5/8 Gurkha Rifles (GR) Infantry Battalion Group at Kailahun by affecting a fighting break out and redeploying them with the main battalion at Daru. About 120 special forces operators commanded by Major (now Lt. Col.) Harinder Sood were airlifted from New Delhi to spearhead the mission to rescue 223 men of the Gurkha Rifles who were surrounded and besieged by the RUF rebels for over 75 days. The mission was a total success which resulted in safe rescue of all the besieged men and inflicted several hundreds of casualties on the RUF, where Indian troops were part of a multinational UN peacekeeping force.

=== British intervention ===
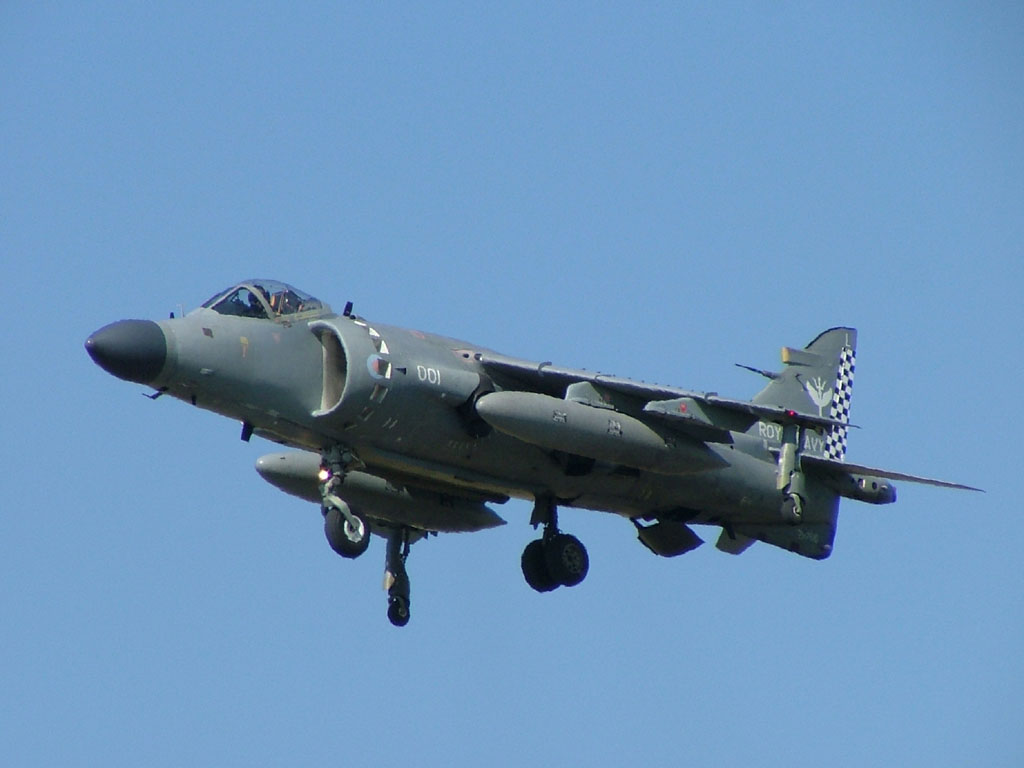
A British Sea Harrier jet, such as those used to support government forces

In May 2000, the situation on the ground had deteriorated to such an extent that British paratroopers were deployed in Operation Palliser to evacuate foreign nationals and establish order. They stabilized the situation, and were the catalyst for a ceasefire that helped end the war. The British forces, under the command of Brigadier David Richards, expanded their original mandate, which was limited to evacuating Commonwealth citizens, and now aimed to save UNAMSIL from the brink of collapse. At the time of the British intervention in May 2000, half of the country remained under the RUF's control. The 1,200 man British ground force – supported by air and sea power – shifted the balance of power in favour of the government and the rebel forces were easily repelled from the areas beyond Freetown.

=== End of the war ===
Several factors led to the end of the civil war. First, Guinean cross-border bombing raids against villages believed to be bases used by the RUF working in conjunction with Guinean dissidents were very effective in routing the rebels. Another factor encouraging a less combative RUF was a new UN resolution that demanded that the government of Liberia expel all RUF members, end their financial support of the RUF, and halt the illicit diamond trade. Finally, the Kamajors, feeling less threatened now that the RUF was disintegrating in the face of a robust opponent, failed to incite violence like they had done in the past. With their backs against the wall and without any international support, the RUF forces signed a new peace treaty within a matter of weeks.

On 18 January 2002, President Kabbah declared the eleven-year-long Sierra Leone Civil War officially over. By most estimates, over 50,000 people had died during the war. Countless more fell victim to the reprehensible and perverse behavior of the combatants. In May 2002 President Kabbah and his SLPP won landslide victories in the presidential and legislative elections. Kabbah was re-elected for a five-year term. The RUF's political wing, the Revolutionary United Front Party (RUFP), failed to win a single seat in parliament. The elections were marked by irregularities and allegations of fraud, but not to a degree that significantly affected the outcome.

== War atrocities and crimes against humanity ==
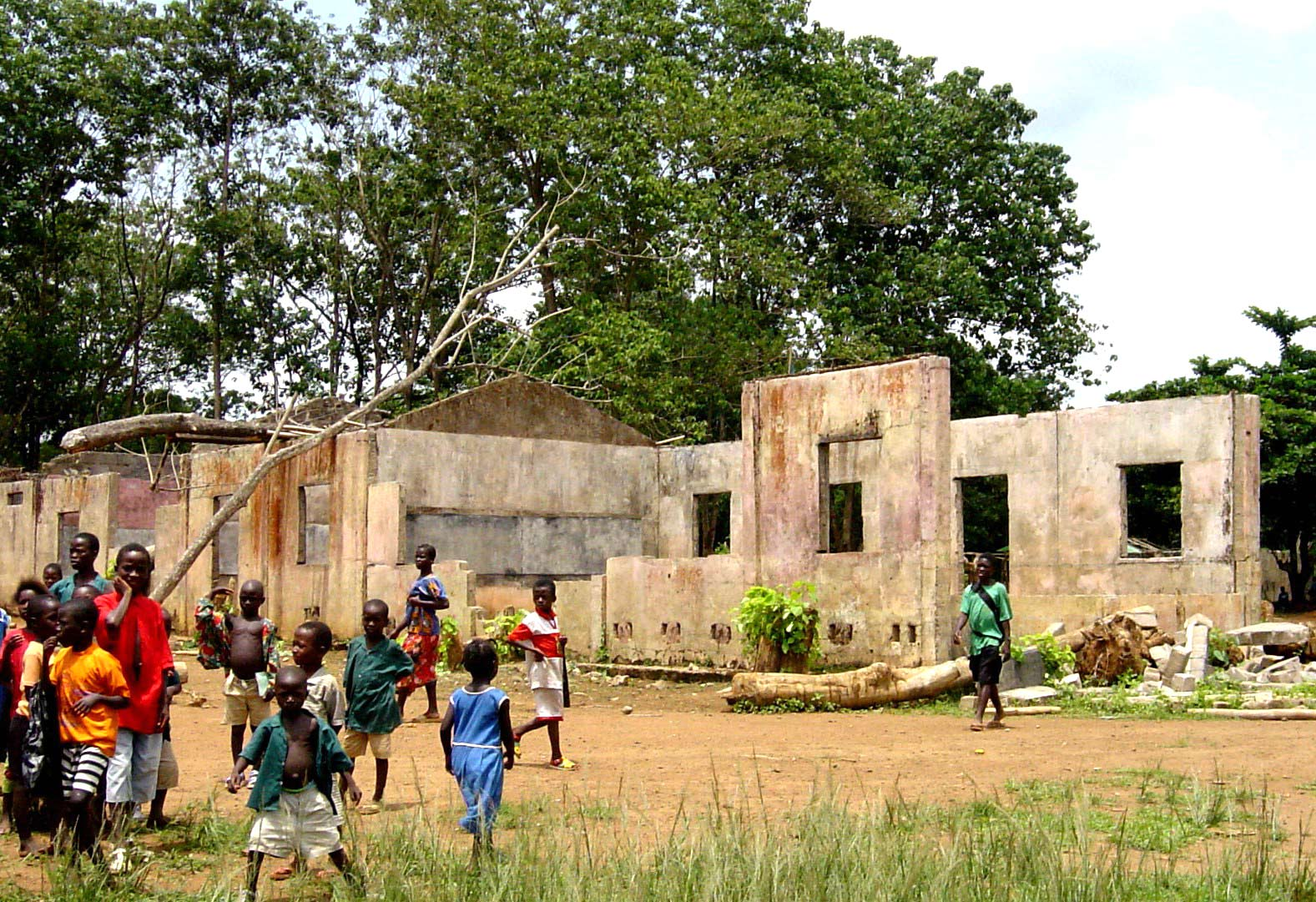
A school destroyed during the civil war, in Kono, eastern Sierra Leone.

During the Sierra Leone Civil War numerous atrocities were committed including war rape, mutilation, and mass murder, causing many of the perpetrators to be tried in international criminal courts, and the establishment of a truth and reconciliation commission. A 2001 overview noted that there had been "serious and grotesque human rights violations" in Sierra Leone since its civil war began in 1991. The rebels, the Revolutionary United Front (RUF), had "committed horrendous abuses". The report noted that "25 times as many people" had already been killed in Sierra Leone than had been killed in the Kosovo war (1998-1999) at the point when the international community decided to take action. "In fact, it has been pointed out by many that the atrocities in Sierra Leone have been worse than was seen in Kosovo." In total, 1,270 primary schools were destroyed in the War.

These crimes included but are not limited to:

=== Mass killings of civilians ===
The most notorious mass killing was the 1999 Freetown massacre. This took place in January 1999 when the AFRC/RUF set upon Freetown in a bloody assault known as "Operation No Living Thing" in which rebels entered neighborhoods to loot, rape and kill indiscriminately. A Human Rights Watch report documented the atrocities committed during this attack. The report estimated that over 7,000 people were killed and that at least half of them were civilians. Reports from survivors describe perverse brutality including incinerating people alive while locked in their houses, hacking civilians' hands and other limbs off with machetes and even eating them.

Cry Freetown, the 2000 documentary film directed by Sorious Samura, shows accounts of the victims of the Sierra Leone Civil War and depicts the most brutal period with the Revolutionary United Front (RUF) rebels burning houses and ECOMOG soldiers summarily executing suspects. Samura filmed Nigerian soldiers executing suspects without trial, including women and children.

=== Drafting of underage soldiers ===
About one quarter of the soldiers serving in the government armed forces during the civil war were under age 18. "Recruitment methods were brutal – sometimes children were abducted, sometimes they were forced to kill members of their own families so as to make them outcasts, sometimes they were drugged, sometimes they were forced into conscription by threatening family members." Child soldiers were deliberately overwhelmed with violence "in order to completely desensitize them and make them mindless killing machines".

=== Mass war rape ===
During the war gender-specific violence was widespread. Rape, sexual slavery and forced marriages were commonplace during the conflict. The majority of assaults were carried out by the Revolutionary United Front (RUF). The Armed Forces Revolutionary Council (AFRC), Civil Defence Forces (CDF), and the Sierra Leone Army (SLA) have also been implicated in sexual violence. The RUF, even though they had access to women, who had been abducted for use as either sex slaves or combatants, frequently raped non-combatants. The militia also carved the RUF initials into women's bodies, which placed them at risk of being mistaken for enemy combatants if they were captured by government forces. Women who were in the RUF were expected to provide sexual services to the male members of the militia. And of all women interviewed, only two had not been repeatedly subjected to sexual violence; gang rape and individual rapes were commonplace. A report from PHR stated that the RUF was guilty of 93 per cent of sexual assaults during the conflict. The RUF was notorious for human rights violations, and regularly amputated arms and legs from their victims. Trafficking by military and militias of women and girls, for use as sex slaves is well documented, with reports from recent conflicts such as those in Angola, the former Yugoslavia, Sierra Leone, Liberia, the DRC, Indonesia, Colombia, Burma and Sudan. During the decade-long civil conflict in Sierra Leone, women were used as sex slaves having been trafficked into refugee camps. According to PHR, one-third of women who reported sexual violence had been kidnapped, with fifteen per cent forced into sexual slavery. The PHR report also showed that ninety-four per cent of internally displaced households had been victims of some form of violence. PHR estimated that there were between 215,000 and 257,000 victims of rape during the conflict.

== After the war ==
=== Withdrawal ===
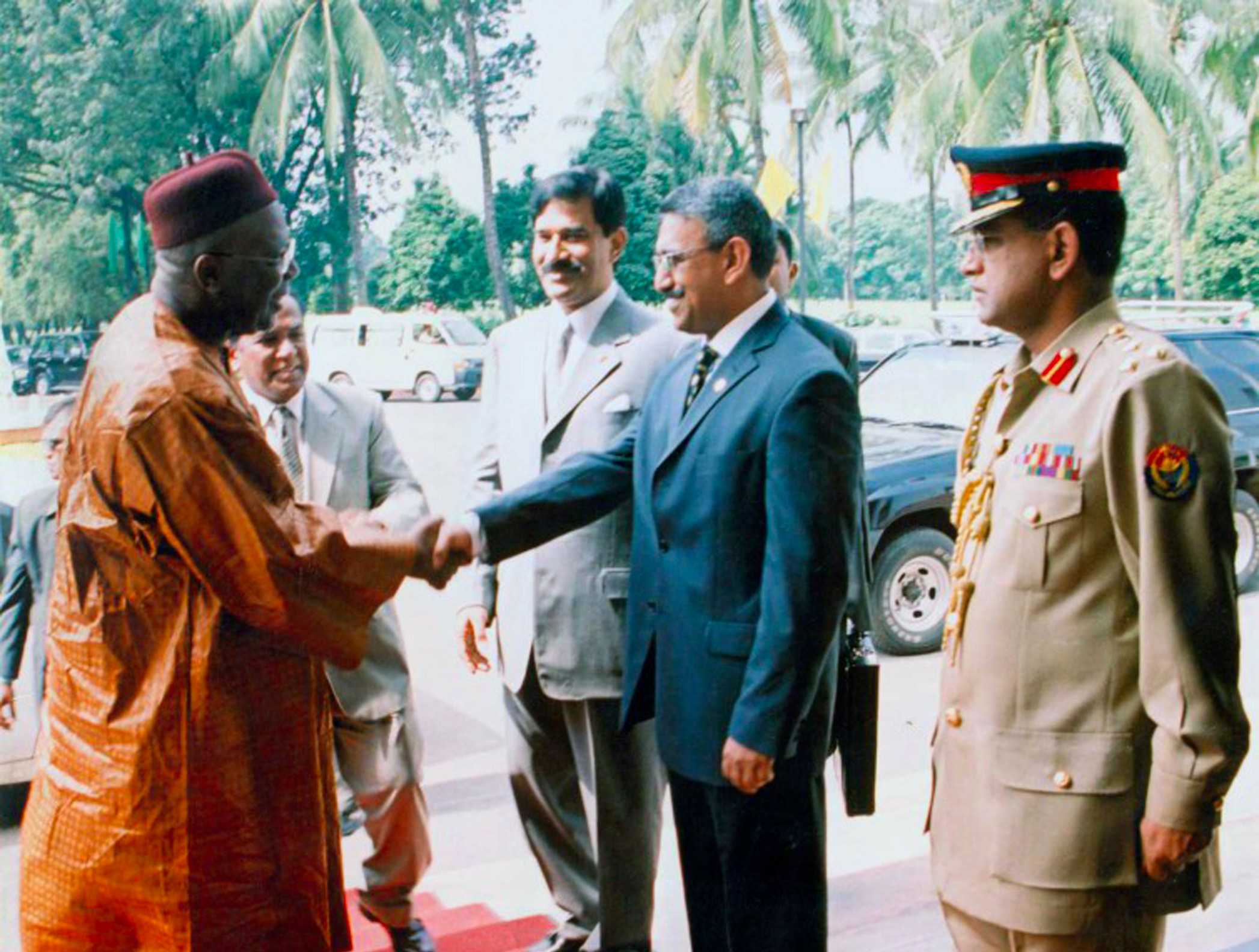
President Kabbah meeting with Prime Minister Mohammad Mosaddak Ali at his Office in Dhaka, Bangladesh in 2004. Bangladesh, together with many other countries, played a key role in the UN's mission in Sierra Leone (UNAMSIL).

On 28 July 2002, the British withdrew a 200-strong military contingent that had been in country since the summer of 2000, leaving behind a 140-strong military training team with orders to professionalize the SLA and Navy. In November 2002, UNAMSIL began a gradual reduction from a peak level of 17,800 personnel. Under pressure from the British, the withdrawal slowed, so that by October 2003 the UNAMSIL contingent still stood at 12,000 men. As peaceful conditions continued through 2004, however, UNAMSIL drew down its forces to slightly over 4,100 by December 2004. The UN Security Council extended UNAMSIL's mandate until June 2005 and again until December 2005. UNAMSIL completed the withdrawal of all troops in December 2005 and was succeeded by the United Nations Integrated Office in Sierra Leone (UNIOSIL).

=== Truth and Reconciliation Commission ===
The Lome Peace Accord called for the establishment of a Truth and Reconciliation Commission to provide a forum for both victims and perpetrators of human rights violations during the conflict to tell their stories and facilitate healing. Subsequently, the Sierra Leonean government asked the UN to help set up a Special Court for Sierra Leone, which would try those who "bear the greatest responsibility for the commission of crimes against humanity, war crimes and serious violations of international humanitarian law, as well as crimes under relevant Sierra Leonean law within the territory of Sierra Leone since 30 November 1996." Both the Truth and Reconciliation Commission and the Special Court began operating in the summer of 2002.

=== Rehabilitation ===
==== Population ====
After the war many of the children who were abducted and used in the conflict needed some form of rehabilitation, debriefing and care after the conflict came to an end. Only a handful of the children could be immediately sent home after six weeks of debriefing at a center for ex-combatants. This is due to many of the children suffering from drug withdrawal symptoms, brainwashing, physical and mental wounds, as well as a lack of memory of who they were or where they came from before the conflict.

There was an estimated one to two million displaced persons and refugees who wanted to or needed to be returned to their villages.

==== Rebuilding ====
Reportedly thousands of small villages had been severely damaged due to looting, and targeted destruction of property that was held by perceived enemies. There was also heavy destruction of clinics and hospitals, leading to a concern about infrastructure stability.

==== Government ====
The European Union [EU] sent budgetary support with the support of the IMF, the World Bank and the UK in an effort to stabilize the economy and the government. The amount of €4.75 million was made available by the EU from 2000 to 2001, for the government finance interalia, and social services.

=== Diamond revenues ===
Diamond revenues in Sierra Leone have increased more than tenfold since the end of the conflict, from $10 million in 2000 to about $130 million in 2004, although according to the UNAMSIL surveys of mining sites, "more than 50 per cent of diamond mining still remains unlicensed and reportedly considerable illegal smuggling of diamonds continues".

=== Prosecution ===
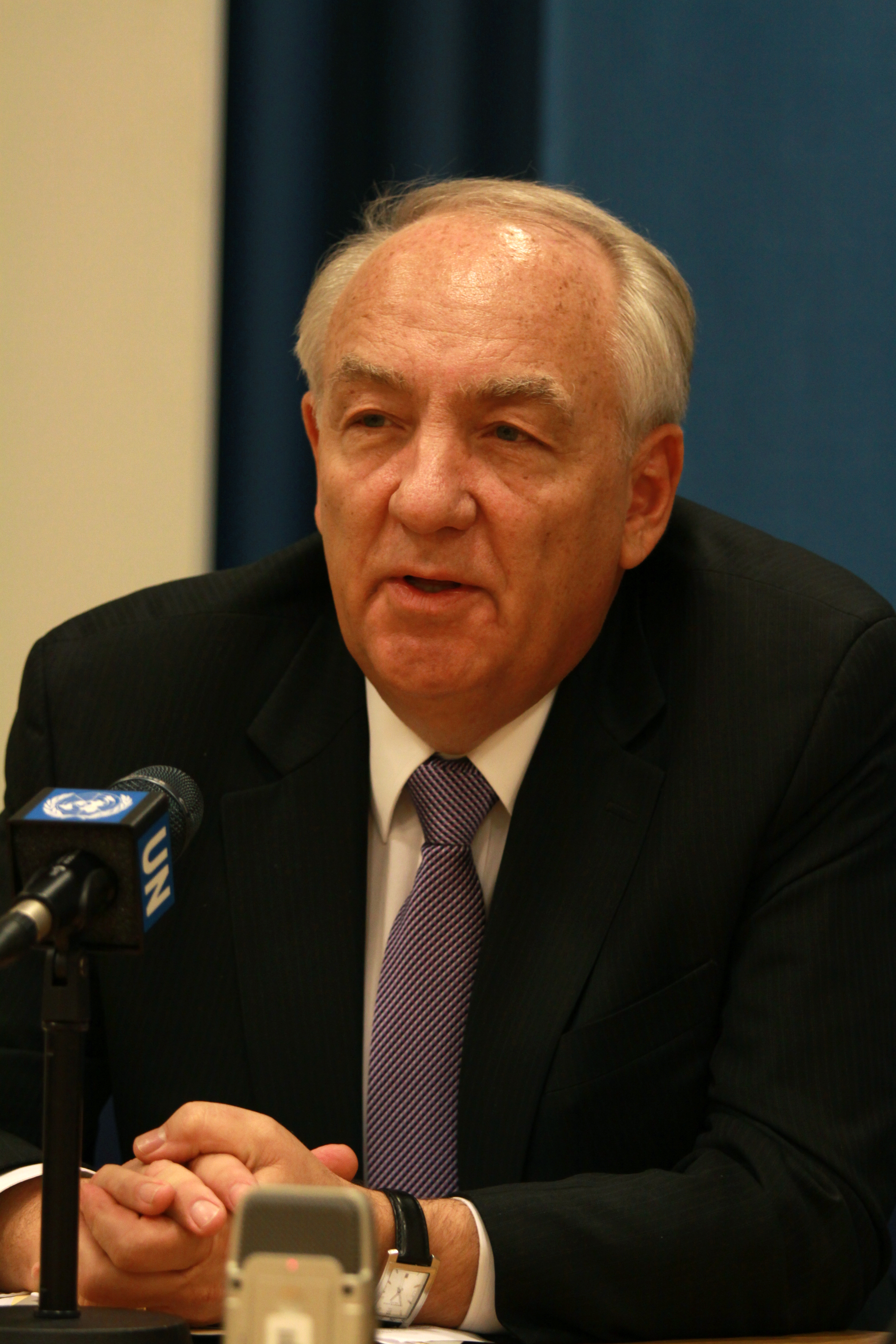
Stephen J. Rapp, chief prosecutor

On 13 January 2003, a small group of armed men tried unsuccessfully to break into an armory in Freetown. Former AFRC-junta leader Koroma, after being linked to the raid, went into hiding. In March, the Special Court for Sierra Leone issued its first indictments for war crimes during the civil war. Sankoh, already in custody, was indicted, along with notorious RUF field commander Sam "Mosquito" Bockarie, Koroma, the Minister of Interior and former head of the Civil Defense Force, Samuel Hinga Norman, and several others. Norman was arrested when the indictments were announced, while Bockarie and Koroma remained at large (presumably in Liberia). On 5 May 2003, Bockarie was killed in Liberia. President Taylor expected to be indicted by the Special Court and had feared Bockarie's testimony. He is suspected of ordering Bockarie's murder, although no indictments are pending.

Several weeks later, word filtered out of Liberia that Koroma had been killed as well, although his death remains unconfirmed. In June the Special Court announced Taylor's indictment for war crimes. Sankoh died in prison in Freetown on 29 July 2003 from a pulmonary embolism. He had been ailing since a stroke the year prior.

In August 2003 President Kabbah testified before the Truth and Reconciliation Commission on his role during the civil war. On 1 December 2003, Major General Tom Carew, who had been the Chief of Defence Staff for the Government of Sierra Leone and an important figure in the SLA, was reassigned to civilian duties. In June 2007, the Special Court found three of the eleven people indicted – Alex Tamba Brima, Brima Bazzy Kamara and Santigie Borbor Kanu – guilty of war crimes, including acts of terrorism, collective punishments, extermination, murder, rape, outrages upon personal dignity, conscripting or enlisting children under the age of 15 years into armed forces, enslavement and pillage.

=== Commemoration ===
On 18 January 2026, Sierra Leone began holding a National Day of Remembrance to commemorate the victims of the civil war.

== Depictions ==
In 2000, the Sierra Leonean journalist, cameraman and editor, Sorious Samura released his documentary Cry Freetown. The self-funded film depicted the most brutal period of the civil war in Sierra Leone with RUF rebels capturing the capital city in the late 1990s and the subsequent fight by ECOMOG and loyal government forces' to take back control of the city. The film won, among other awards, an Emmy Award and a Peabody.

The documentary movie Sierra Leone's Refugee All Stars tells the story of a group of refugees who fled to Guinea and created a band to ease the pain of the constant difficulty of living away from home and community after the atrocities of war and mutilation.

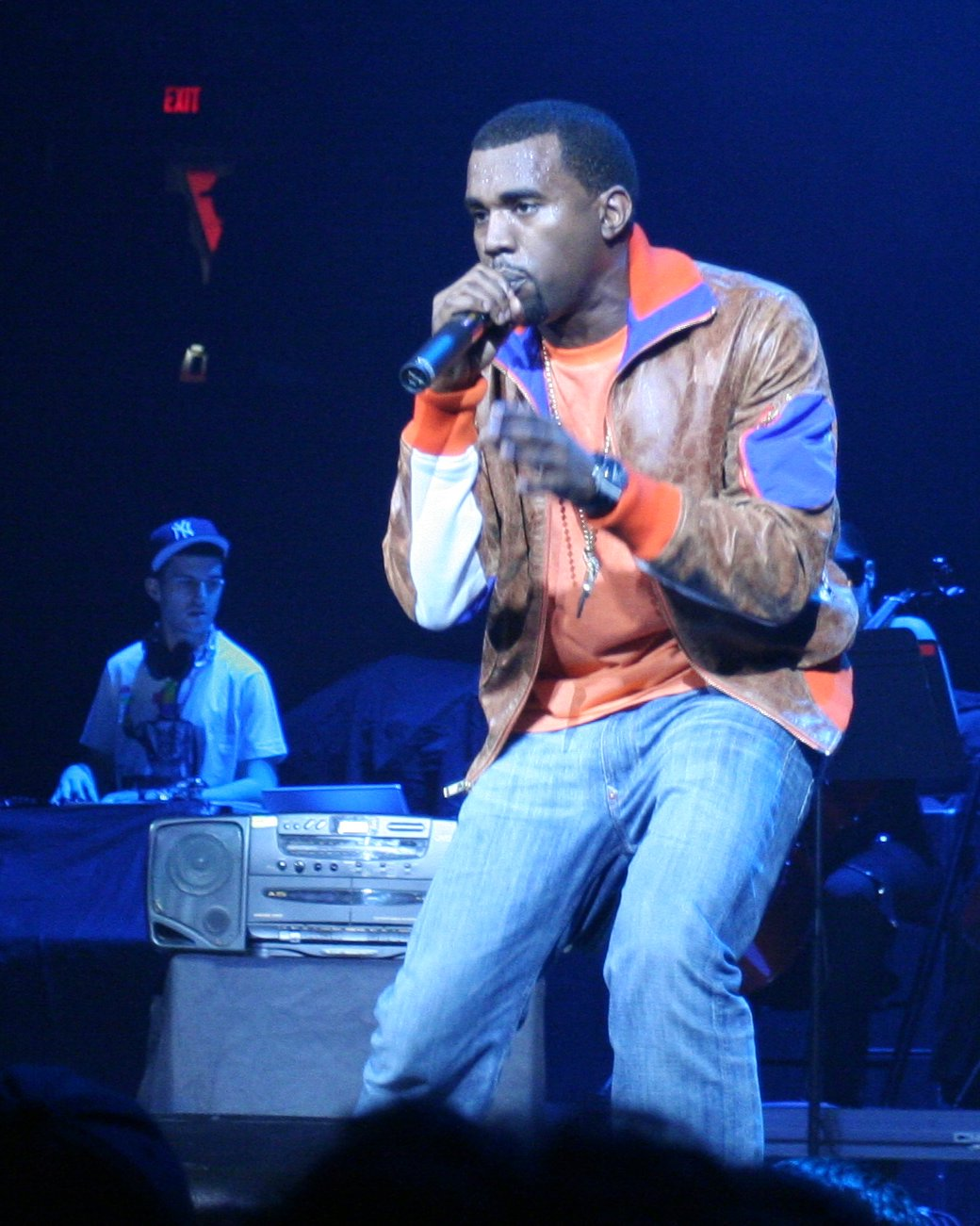
West performing at a concert in 2005, Portland, United States – four months after the release of Late Registration

The title and lyrics of American rapper Kanye West's 2005 hit song "Diamonds from Sierra Leone", from his second studio album Late Registration, were based on one of the key circumstances surrounding the civil war (conflict/blood diamonds). West was inspired to record the song after reading about the issue of conflict diamonds and how their sales were continuing to fuel the violent civil war in Sierra Leone. The song won Best Rap Song at the 48th Annual Grammy Awards, and won one of the Pop Awards at the 2006 BMI London Awards, before being named by Slant Magazine as among the best singles of the 2000s decade.

The civil war also served as the background for the 2006 movie Blood Diamond, starring Leonardo DiCaprio, Djimon Hounsou and Jennifer Connelly. During the end of the movie Lord of War, Yuri Orlov (played by Nicolas Cage) sells arms to militias during the civil war. The militias are allied with André Baptiste (Eamonn Walker), who is based on Charles Taylor.

The use of children in both the rebel (RUF) military and the government militia is depicted in Ishmael Beah's 2007 memoir, A Long Way Gone.

Mariatu Kamara wrote about being attacked by the rebels and having her hands chopped off in her book The Bite of the Mango. Ishmael Beah wrote a foreword to Kamara's book.

In the 2012 Documentary La vita non perde valore, by Wilma Massucco, former child soldiers and some of their victims talk about the way how they feel and live, ten years after the Sierra Leone civil war ending, thanks to the personal, familiar and social rehabilitation provided to them by Father Giuseppe Berton, an Italian missionary of the Xaverian order. The documentary has been analyzed in different universities, becoming the subject of various research papers.

Jonathon Torgovnik wrote about eight women that he interviewed after the war had ended in his book; Girl Soldier: Life After War in Sierra Leone. In the book he describes the experiences of the eight women who were abducted during the war and forced to fight in it.

== See also ==
- Burundian Civil War
- Second Congo War
- Second Liberian Civil War
