= Richard Lussick =

Samoan judge (born 1940)

Richard Lussick (born 1940) is a Samoan judge. He was the presiding judge in the trial of Charles Taylor by the Special Court for Sierra Leone; in May 2012, he sentenced Taylor to 50 years in prison.

Lussick was born in Sydney, Australia in 1940, and educated at Marist Brothers, Kogarah before attending the University of Sydney. He was admitted to the New South Wales bar in 1973, and practiced law in Australia until 1986, when he moved to Samoa to become parliamentary counsel to the Attorney-General of Samoa. In 1987 he was appointed a judge in Samoa, and subsequently held appointments to the District Court, Supreme Court, Court of Appeal, Land and Titles Court and as Acting Chief Justice. He also served as Chairman of the Public Service Board of Appeal from 1988 to 1995. In 1995 he threw out sedition charges against two former MPs who had led the Tumua and Pule protest marches against the Value Added and Goods and Services Tax.

From 1995 to 1999, he served as the Chief Justice of the Republic of Kiribati. He was Vice President of the Commonwealth Magistrates’ and Judges’ Association (Pacific Region) from 1997 to 2000.

In 2004 he was appointed to the Special Court for Sierra Leone, where he served until 2012. He served as presiding judge in 2006, 2009, and 2012. From 2005 to 2006 he also sat as the Staff Appeals Judge for the Special Court. He has also served as President of the United Nations Appeals Tribunal. He is also a judge of the Residual Special Court for Sierra Leone.

In March 2024 he was appointed president of the Residual Special Court of Sierra Leone for a two-year term.
