= Johnny Paul Koroma =

Military dictator of Sierra Leone from May 1997 to February 1998

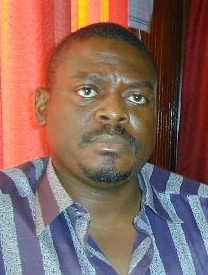

Head of State of Sierra Leone
- In office 25 May 1997 – 6 February 1998
- Deputy: Foday Sankoh; Solomon Musa
- Preceded by: Ahmed Tejan Kabbah
- Succeeded by: Ahmed Tejan Kabbah

Personal details
- Born: 9 May 1960 Tombodu, Kono District, British Sierra Leone
- Died: 1 June 2003 (aged 43) or 11 August 2017 (aged 57) Liberia or Sierra Leone
- Party: Peace and Liberation Party

Military service
- Branch/service: Sierra Leone Armed Forces
- Years of service: 1985–1998
- Rank: Major
- Battles/wars: Sierra Leone Civil War

Major Johnny Paul Koroma (9 May 1960 – 1 June 2003 or 11 August 2017) was a Sierra Leonean military officer who was the head of state of Sierra Leone from May 1997 to February 1998.

A member of the Limba people, Koroma began his military career in 1985, and quickly rose through the ranks of the Sierra Leonean army. Following the start of the Sierra Leone Civil War in 1991, Koroma commanded government forces against the Revolutionary United Front (RUF) rebel group. As the war continued, he was arrested in 1996 after being suspected of plotting a coup against President Ahmad Tejan Kabbah. The following year, he was freed from prison following a coup overthrowing Kabbah, and became the leader of the Armed Forces Revolutionary Council (AFRC) military junta. Koroma allied himself with the RUF and presided over mass looting, murder and rape against civilians, aid workers, and peacekeepers over his roughly nine months in power. In 1998, an intervention by the Economic Community of West African States (ECOWAS) ousted him, and the war ended in 2002.

In 2003, Koroma was indicted by the Special Court for Sierra Leone for war crimes, crimes against humanities and other offenses for his role in the war. Koroma reportedly fled into exile in Liberia where he was murdered later that year. Other sources claim that he died in Sierra Leone in 2017.

== Youth and education ==
Koroma was born to Limba parents in Tombodu, in the Kono District of eastern British Sierra Leone, and grew up in Freetown, the capital. He is from the same ethnic group as former presidents Siaka Stevens and Joseph Saidu Momoh.

He joined the Sierra Leonean army in 1985 and was sent to the Royal Military Academy Sandhurst in England in 1988 to train as an officer. He returned to Sierra Leone the next year and was promoted to platoon commander, and soon thereafter to company commander. He continued to move up the ladder, and in 1994, he went to the Teshi Military College in Ghana for training in army command.

== Coups and civil war ==
Koroma received military training in Nigeria and the United Kingdom. He commanded government forces who were fighting against the Revolutionary United Front (RUF), a rebel army led by the warlord Foday Sankoh. In August 1996, he was arrested for alleged involvement in a coup plot against the southern civilian officials who were in control of the country. It was also alleged that there were plans to kill President Ahmad Tejan Kabbah.

Koroma was freed from prison during a successful military coup on 25 May 1997, when 17 junior soldiers serving the Sierra Leone Army (SLA) broke into the central prison and made a do-or-die offer that brought him to power. He advocated making a peaceful settlement with Sankoh and allowing him to join the government, though this never happened.

After the coup in 1997, Koroma was named head of state and chairman of the Armed Forces Revolutionary Council (AFRC). He invited the leadership of the Revolutionary United Front to join the AFRC, which they promptly did. To maintain order, he suspended the constitution, banned demonstrations and abolished all political parties.

The AFRC coup was accompanied by an explosion of violence against civilians throughout the nation. The key strategic change was that the RUF had immediate access throughout the country, something they had failed to achieve through six years of military action. Koroma cited corruption, erosion of state sovereignty, over-dependence on foreign nations, and leaders' failure to address tensions between the SLA and government-backed tribal militia movements (in particular the Kamajors) as the pretext for the coup.

Koroma's story was consistent with that of the AFRC, which cited the failure of the Abidjan Peace Accord struck between the government of Sierra Leone and the RUF on 30 November 1996.

=== Involvement of ECOMOG ===
By 2 June 1997, the RUF/AFRC found itself at odds with Nigerian forces, which were deployed unilaterally under the Economic Community of West African States' Ceasefire Monitoring Group (ECOMOG) and its mandate of August 1997. The Nigerians were stationed in and around Freetown's Western Area, trading mortar fire along the main highway into Freetown and around Freetown International Airport.

Koroma immediately sought to ease the situation, seeking mediation, which resulted in the signing of a peace accord in late October 1997 in Conakry, Guinea. Almost immediately, violations of the peace accord were perpetrated by all sides in the complex conflict. By January 1998, ECOMOG forces were preparing to oust the RUF/AFRC from power.

On 6 February 1998, ECOMOG forces invaded key locations in the Western Area, removing the RUF/AFRC entirely by 12 February. On 1 March, ECOMOG forces commenced operations in provincial Sierra Leone, removing the RUF/AFRC from every key town except Kailahun (in the far east of the country). By December 1998, RUF/AFRC forces had reversed this position, and they entered Freetown in January 1999. Failing to hold territory, the RUF/AFRC retreated into the Northern Province of Sierra Leone.

=== Lomé Peace Agreement ===
The leadership of the RUF oversaw negotiations with the government of Sierra Leone that led to the signing of the Lomé Peace Accord on 7 July 1999. Koroma was cut out of the negotiations, and the AFRC did not benefit from the substantive provisions of the agreement. Nevertheless, Koroma participated in the disarmament process, encouraging those SLA soldiers who had joined the AFRC to demobilize.

By 2000, Koroma no longer held significant influence over the RUF leadership, as evidenced by the involvement of ex-AFRC members (from a splinter group called the West Side Boys) in defending towns in Port Loko District against a renewed RUF offensive in May 2000. In August 2000, Koroma officially disbanded the AFRC and sought to consolidate his position by forming a political party.

== Special Court for Sierra Leone ==
In early 2002, the government of Sierra Leone and the United Nations signed a bilateral treaty establishing the Special Court for Sierra Leone, mandated to try those who "bear the greatest responsibility" for crimes against humanity, war crimes, and other serious violations of international humanitarian law. According to the indictment, the RUF/AFRC, under the orders of Koroma, had led armed attacks in Sierra Leone in which the primary targets included civilians, humanitarian aid workers, and UN peacekeeping forces.

These attacks served the purpose of terrorizing the population as a form of punishment for not supporting rebel activities. They included such crimes as looting, murder, mutilations, sexual violence, and rape. Child soldiers were conscripted, and women and girls were kidnapped to be raped or turned into sex slaves. Men and boys were also abducted and forced to work or fight for the rebel groups.

On 7 March 2003, the prosecutor of the Special Court issued his first indictments. For his role in the RUF/AFRC, Koroma was among them. He fled Freetown in December, reportedly to Liberia. On 1 June 2003, he was officially declared dead under mysterious circumstances, said to have been murdered. However, the prosecutor has yet to withdraw the indictment against Koroma. An October 2006 newspaper headline in Freetown read, "Johnny Paul has 1,000 armed soldiers".

According to an unconfirmed report in September 2008, Koroma's remains were found buried in Foya, a village in Liberia's Lofa County. However, Stephen Rapp, the Special Court's prosecutor, noted that DNA tests on the remains found in Lofa County did not match Koroma's DNA. Many still believe Koroma was executed somewhere in Lofa at the hands of former President Charles Taylor of Liberia.

Three witnesses—former Vice President Moses Blah of Liberia; Joseph Zig Zag Marzah, a former member of Taylor's National Patriotic Front of Liberia (NPFL) rebel group; and a protected witness—testified that while they had not witnessed Koroma's execution, Taylor had told them about it. In October 2010, Taylor's defense team filed a motion to have these testimonies removed as evidence, alleging that the prosecution had bribed the three witnesses, but this motion was rejected the following month.

Koroma allegedly died on 10 or 11 August 2017 in his home village of Binkolo.
