= Renate Winter =

Austrian judge

Judge Renate Winter

Judge to the Special Court for Sierra Leone
- Incumbent
- Assumed office 2002
- Appointed by: UN Secretary-General

Justice Renate Winter (born March 8, 1944) is an Austrian judge to the Special Court for Sierra Leone, and an expert on family law, juvenile justice systems, women’s justice issues and child labour. She is a founding member of the International Institute for the Rights of the Child (IDE) which is dedicated to the worldwide training of judicial personnel and dissemination of information on children’s rights and former president of the International Association of Youth and Family Court Judges.

Winter holds a law degree as well as a master's degree in interpretation from the University of Vienna.

Winter is a contributor to the Draft Model Law on Juvenile Justice, the UN Manual on Juvenile Justice, and the Draft Model Law on Child Victims & Witness Protection.

== Legal career ==
From 1981 to 1996, Winter has been a judge at the Vienna Youth Court, where she has undertaken projects to help rehabilitate juveniles with problems of drug addiction and mental disability. Winter has also worked on projects relating to youth and child soldiers for the United Nations, including in numerous African countries as well as in Latin America.

Throughout the 1990s, Winter chaired numerous international conferences on matters relating to juvenile justice and gender-related justice issues.

From 1996 to 2000, she was Consultant for the UN Center for the International Crime Prevention (CICP) at the United Nations in Vienna advising government officials on the implementation on the implementation of the Convention on the Rights of the Child on four continents (e.g. in the Balkans, in the Baltics, in Central European and Asian Countries, in the Maghreb, in East and West Africa and Latin America.)

From 2000 to 2002, Winter was International Judge with the United Nations Mission in Kosovo (UNMIK) at the Mitrovica Regional District Court and Justice at the Supreme Court of Kosovo as part of the United Nations interim civilian administration.

In 2002, she was appointed as Judge to the Appeals Chamber of the Special Court for Sierra Leone by the UN Secretary-General. From 2008 to 2010 she was elected President of the Special Court.

Throughout her career, Justice Winter has worked for child-friendly juvenile justice and the protection of children. She has worked with State parties from diverse legal cultures on the implementation of the Convention on the Rights of the Child.

As an international judge in post-conflict situations, Justice Winter acquired first-hand experience in tackling challenges in the protection of women and children, including the rehabilitation and reintegration of children affected by armed conflict.

Winter has contributed to a number of United Nations draft model laws and manuals in the area of juvenile justice. She has long-standing expertise in the prevention of child abuse and the protection of children against organized crime, including trafficking.
