= West Side Boys =

Militant group in Sierra Leone from 1998 to 2000

- Leader: Foday Kallay
- Dates active: 1998–2000
- Active regions: Occra Hills, Sierra Leone
- Status: Defunct
- Size: 400–600

The West Side Boys, also known as the West Side Niggaz or the West Side Junglers, was an armed group in Sierra Leone, sometimes described as a splinter faction of the Armed Forces Revolutionary Council.

It captured and held peacekeepers from the United Nations Mission in Sierra Leone (UNAMSIL) and, in August 2000, captured a group of British soldiers from the Royal Irish Regiment and its Sierra Leone Army liaison officer. The group disintegrated shortly after Operation Barras.

The group was influenced to some extent by American rap and gangsta rap music, especially Tupac Shakur, and the "gangsta" culture portrayed therein. Since the title 'West Side Niggaz' would have been an unacceptable phrase to be regularly used on news programmes concerning the group, the title was amended to render it to the innocuous 'West Side Boys'. Prior to its destruction, the group's size had expanded to around 600 but later suffered about 200 defections.

Many members of the group were child soldiers abducted after their parents had been killed by the "recruiters". Some of these children were forced to participate in torturing their parents to death in order to brutalise and dehumanise them. The West Side Boys's members were heavy users of poyo (homemade palm wine), locally grown marijuana, and heroin bought with conflict diamonds. Conflict diamonds were also used to purchase many of their weapons, which ranged from FN FAL/L1A1 rifles, AK-47/AKM rifles and RPG-7 grenade launchers to 81 mm mortars and ZPU-2 anti-aircraft guns. Most of their vehicles were hijacked from UN food convoys.

== Description ==
At the time that the West Side Boys were active, large areas of Sierra Leone were controlled by militias. However, there existed no provable connections to the main rebel group in Sierra Leone, the Revolutionary United Front.

They were frequently the subject of British media, due in part to their kidnapping of soldiers and their flamboyant character, as reported by the BBC: "They were known for wearing bizarre clothing – women's wigs and flip-flops were favourites – and being almost perpetually drunk."

A 2008 article published in the Journal of Modern African Studies offers an alternative view of the West Side Boys as an effective military unit employing military and political techniques to achieve defined goals, as opposed to a criminal gang with no political purpose engendered by the perpetual lawlessness and social breakdown of the country.

== Bibliography ==
- Operation Certain Death, Damien Lewis, Arrow Books, 2005, ISBN 978-0099466420
