= Armed Forces Revolutionary Council =

Insurgent group of Sierra Leonean soldiers active from 1997 to 2002

- Leader: Major Johnny Paul Koroma
- Dates active: 1997–2002
- Group: West Side Boys
- Headquarters: Sierra Leone
- Active regions: Sierra Leone
- Wars: the Sierra Leone Civil War

The Armed Forces Revolutionary Council (AFRC) was a group of Sierra Leone soldiers that allied itself with the rebel Revolutionary United Front in the late 1990s. While the AFRC briefly controlled the country in 1998, it was driven from the capital by an international military intervention of the Economic Community of West African States Monitoring Group (ECOMOG). It was no longer a coherent and effective organization by the elections of 2002.

== Description ==
The AFRC was formed by Major Johnny Paul Koroma of the Sierra Leonean military in 1997, who used it to carry out a coup d'etat against the government of President Ahmad Tejan Kabbah. The former Sierra Leone Army ("ex-SLA") is a term used to refer to soldiers loyal to the AFRC. Several rationales have been suggested for the coup, including: anger at the government for not implementing the November 1996 peace agreement with the Revolutionary United Front (RUF), perceived ethnic discrimination in the appointment of the highest ranks of government, perceived financial neglect of the armed forces, and favoritism for the ethnic Mende Kamajors led by Samuel Hinga Norman.

Following the coup, in May 1997 the AFRC demanded that the Nigerian-led West African peacekeeping force then in the country release the arrested RUF leader Foday Sankoh. Sankoh gave his blessing to the AFRC, and RUF forces who had been fighting in the countryside linked up with AFRC forces in the capital Freetown. Sankoh was named Vice-Chairman of the AFRC and several other RUF leaders were named to high positions. The AFRC and RUF thus formed a joint military junta controlling the country.

However, in March 1998 the AFRC/RUF was forced out of Freetown by an invading West African force that put President Kabbah back in power. However, the rebels according to their respective origins, RUF and ex-SLA, under the renewed pressure, with a force of ex-SLA based in the Occra Hills, 50 km from the capital. The rebel AFRC regrouped to retake the capital in January 1999, but was again forced out by the Nigerian-led force.

By 1999, the authority of the AFRC and Major Koroma over the ex-SLA had become very uncertain and the AFRC is commonly seen as devolving into bands of loosely associated combatants. The West Side Boys rebel group are sometimes referred to as an AFRC splinter group. The West Side Boys abducted several soldiers of the British army that were training West African peacekeepers in July 2000, and was subsequently destroyed by British forces in a September raid that freed the hostages. While many of the combatants who were under the command of the Armed Forces Revolutionary Council continued to fight, the "AFRC" designation gradually ceased to become useful and the AFRC organization is no longer considered to exist.

After the folding of AFRC, Koroma's supporters have organized the Peace and Liberation Party.

== Indictment and conviction ==
In June 2007, the Special Court found three of the eleven people indicted – Alex Tamba Brima, Brima Bazzy Kamara and Santigie Borbor Kanu – guilty of war crimes, including acts of terrorism, collective punishments, extermination, murder, rape, outrages upon personal dignity, conscripting or enlisting children under the age of 15 years into armed forces, enslavement and pillage. It was notably the first-ever international court to bring a guilty verdict for the military conscription of children.
