= Foday Sankoh =

Sierra Leonean warlord (1937–2003)

- Sankoh in 2000

Vice President of Sierra Leone
- In office 1999 – 17 May 2000
- Preceded by: Albert Joe Demby
- Succeeded by: Albert Joe Demby

Personal details
- Born: October 17, 1937 Masang Mayoso, Tonkolili District, British Sierra Leone
- Died: July 29, 2003 (aged 65) Freetown, Sierra Leone
- Party: Revolutionary United Front
- Profession: Rebel, Soldier
- Ethnicity: Temne

Military service
- Allegiance: Sierra Leone
- Branch/service: Sierra Leone Armed Forces
- Years of service: 1956–1971
- Rank: Corporal
- Battles/wars: Sierra Leone Civil War

Foday Saybana Sankoh (17 October 1937 – 29 July 2003) was a Sierra Leonean rebel leader who was the founder and commander of the Revolutionary United Front (RUF) rebel group, which was supported by the Charles Taylor-led NPFL in the 11-year-long Sierra Leone Civil War, starting in 1991 and ending in 2002. An estimated 50,000 people were killed during the war, and over 500,000 people were displaced into neighboring countries.

== Biography ==
Sankoh, belonging to the Temne tribe, was born into a poor farming family in Northern Sierra Leone. In 1956 he joined the Royal West African Forces and trained as a cameraman and a wireless operator reaching the rank of corporal. In 1971, he was arrested and imprisoned for seven years for joining a coup plot against Siaka Stevens.

He was also reportedly a student leader, later traveling to Libya in the 1980s to train under the Libyan president Muammar Gaddafi. In 1991 Sankoh returned to Sierra Leone and sponsored by Liberian rebel Charles Taylor he launched a civil war against the government of Sierra Leone. In 1997 he was arrested in Nigeria on weapons charges, but had been released by July 1999 to sign the Lomé peace agreement.

This agreement, however, faced multiple violations and called into question his control of his army and his commitment to ending the civil war. After an angry mob marched on his Freetown villa in May 2000 and threatened to lynch him, he was taken into protective custody and held in detention until his death in July 2003.

== Death ==
Sankoh died in hospital of complications arising from a stroke whilst awaiting trial on the night of 29 July 2003. In a statement by the UN-backed war crimes court, chief prosecutor David Crane said that Sankoh's death granted him "a peaceful end that he denied to so many others".

Political offices
Preceded by Albert Joe Demby	Vice President of Sierra Leone; 1999–2000	Succeeded by Albert Joe Demby
