= Revolutionary United Front =

Rebel army and political party in Sierra Leone

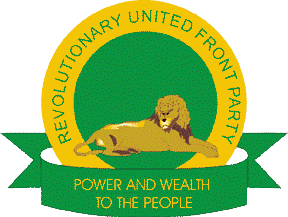
- Emblem of the RUF
- Founders: Foday Sankoh and allies
- Dates active: 1980s–2002
- Merged into: Revolutionary United Front (Party)
- Allegiance: Liberated Zone (1991–2002)
- Active regions: Sierra Leone
- Size: 20,000 (1999)
- Wars: Sierra Leone Civil War

The Revolutionary United Front (RUF) was a rebel group that fought a failed eleven-year war in Sierra Leone, beginning in 1991 and ending in 2002. It later transformed into a political party, which still exists today. The three most senior surviving leaders, Issa Sesay, Morris Kallon, and Augustine Gbao, were convicted in February 2009 of war crimes and crimes against humanity.

== Creation ==
The RUF initially coalesced as a group of Sierra Leoneans who led elements of the National Patriotic Front of Liberia across the Liberian border. Their goal was to replicate Charles Taylor's earlier success in toppling the Liberian government.

The RUF was created by Foday Sankoh, of Temne background, and some allies, Abu Kanu, Rashid Mansaray, with substantial assistance from Charles Taylor of Liberia. Initially, the RUF was popular with Sierra Leoneans, many of whom resented a Freetown elite seen as corrupt and looked forward to promised free education and health care and equitable sharing of diamond revenues. However, the RUF developed a reputation internationally for its terrible cruelty towards the civilian population during its decade-long struggle, especially its practice of hacking off limbs to intimidate and spread terror among the population, and its widespread use of child soldiers.

When it was first formed, the RUF put forward the slogan, "No More Slaves, No More Masters. Power and Wealth to the People." The RUF’s pledge to fight against the one-party system, imposed by the All People’s Congress since independence in 1961, and for a more transparent and democratic state. It shared certain similarities to other revolutionary organizations, despite never describing itself as socialist or Marxist. The RUF published a pamphlet entitled "Footpaths to Democracy: Toward a New Sierra Leone", which contained references to social justice and pan-Africanism. However, "much of the RUF’s original ideology was lost among RUF fighters themselves, since a large proportion were in fact Liberian rebels fighting for their own cause."

== Coup ==
Foday Sankoh did not stand by his earlier promises of equitably sharing diamond revenues and used these funds to buy arms for himself. With a significant area of the diamond mines under the control of the rebel party, the RUF became singularly focused on protecting its resource base.

Sierra Leone's economy collapsed. Ordinary citizens became trapped between the cruelty of RUF troops and starvation. After a coup by the Armed Forces Revolutionary Council (AFRC) in 1997, the RUF and AFRC created a joint junta to control the country before being evicted from the capital by the intervention of a Nigerian-led West African force that reinstated President Ahmad Tejan Kabbah. The war is estimated to have cost the lives of about 200,000 people.

== Child soldiers ==
Child soldiers were heavily recruited in the Sierra Leone Civil War; a total of 11,000 are thought to have participated in the conflict. Most were used for attacks on villages as well as guard duty for diamond fields and weapons stockpiles. The RUF made extensive use of child soldiers.

Reports alleged that the group abducted thousands of children and subjected them to forced recruitment into armed groups or prostitution.

According to contemporary reports, some RUF combatants marked their chests with the initials "RUF". Reports also alleged that commanders gave cocaine to combatants, including children, and in some cases applied the drug to open wounds. Mixtures reportedly containing cocaine and gunpowder, commonly known as "brown-brown", were allegedly distributed before combat operations.

A report alleged that RUF combatants removed a fetus from a pregnant woman. The account was reportedly based on testimony from two women who stated that they had witnessed the incident.

The RUF reportedly abducted children primarily between the ages of seven and twelve, although some accounts documented the abduction of children as young as five. Children recruited into RUF units were reportedly subjected to coercive discipline and, in some cases, compelled to commit acts of violence against civilians. Their reported conduct must be considered in the context of their forced recruitment and exploitation as children associated with an armed group.

== Atrocities ==
In response to the immediate execution of rebels by government forces, the RUF instituted a policy of cutting off the hands of captured soldiers with the intent of sending the message: "You don't hold your weapon against your brother." Brandishing machetes, RUF rebels amputated the hands, arms, and legs of tens of thousands of Sierra Leoneans. The RUF indicated that the reason for these actions was that amputees could no longer mine diamonds, which might be used to support government troops.

The election slogan at that time was the people "had power in their hands", so the RUF would hack off hands to prevent people from voting. RUF members are also alleged to have practised cannibalism. Refugee camps were set up for amputees, supported by the government and other relief agencies.

== Foreign pressure and intervention ==
In March 1997, Sankoh fled to Nigeria, where he was put under house arrest, and then imprisoned. During Sankoh's incarceration, which ended in 1999, Sam Bockarie filled in as director of RUF military operations. In 1999, after enormous pressure by the United States, the United Kingdom, the UN, and various other countries, Sankoh was forced into signing the Lomé Peace Accord on 7 July 1999.

Sankoh was then allowed to return under the conditions of the agreement. However fighting again broke out, and the UN sent peacekeeping troops in hopes of integrating the RUF into a new national army. This intervention failed as well, and by 2000 they held 500 UN peacekeepers hostage until their release was negotiated by Taylor. The UK, Guinea, India, Bangladesh, Pakistan and various other nations, sent in professional forces in 2001. The RUF was noted to be weakened, especially decreasing resources, and hence had to suffer several crushing defeats at the hands of the British special forces; which eventually led to the end of the revolution, hence the end of the civil war in Sierra Leone. Sankoh was later captured by a mob and handed to the British Army in Sierra Leone. He was indicted for multiple war crimes by a UN-backed special court. In 2003 Sankoh died in prison before the trial took place.

Four years later, during the sessions of the Special Court for Sierra Leone, prosecutors claimed that Charles Taylor had actively participated in directing the RUF's strategy from Liberia; among the allegations was that he had arranged to transport RUF commanders to Monrovia to meet with them personally.

== Political party ==
Revolutionary United Front Party
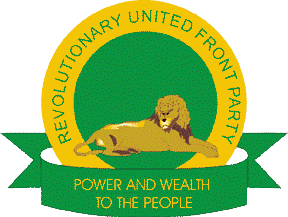
- Founded: September 2001
- Colors: Yellow; Green
- Slogan: Power and wealth to the people

Website
- rufp.org (archived)

After peace was established, RUF was transformed into a political party: the Revolutionary United Front Party. In the May 10, 2002 general election the party won 2.2% of popular votes and no seats. Its candidate at the presidential elections, Alimamy Pallo Bangura, received 1.7% of the vote. The party received its highest voting in Kailahun, 7.8% in the parliamentary election. It has since drifted into near-irrelevance, only maintaining a small voter base of former rebel fighters.

== Electoral history ==
=== Presidential elections ===
Election	Party candidate	Votes	%	Votes	%	Result
Election	Party candidate	First round		Second round		Result
2002	Alimamy Pallo Bangura	33,074	1.73%	—N/a		Lost ✗
2007	Did not contest					
2012	Eldred Collins	12,993	0.58%	—N/a		Lost ✗
2018	Gbandi Jemba Ngobeh	12,827	0.51%	—N/a		Lost ✗
2023	Abdulahi Saccoh	6,796	0.24%	—N/a		Lost ✗

=== Parliamentary elections ===
Election	Leader	Votes	%	Seats	+/–	Position	Government
2002	Alimamy Pallo Bangura	41,997	2.20%	0 / 124	New	4th	Extra-parliamentary
2007	Did not contest						Extra-parliamentary
2012	Jonathan Kposowa	12,573	0.59%	0 / 124	0	▲5th	Extra-parliamentary
2018	Raymond Kartewu	438	0.02%	0 / 146	0	▼16th	Extra-parliamentary
2023	Foday Massaquoi	1,502	0.05%	0 / 149	0	▲6th	Extra-parliamentary

== Cultural references ==
=== Television ===
- Law & Order episode "Blood Money" was centered around the strife in Sierra Leone and the traffic in conflict diamonds
- The final season of Walker, Texas Ranger had an episode titled "Blood Diamonds", based in part on the RUF which brought to light some of their atrocities as well as the black market trade of blood diamonds for illegal arms. The entirety of the episode turned out to be a vivid nightmare experienced by Alex.
- Dexter: Resurrection introduces a new character, Blessing Kamara, who in episode 6, details to Dexter Morgan his experience both in and getting out of the RUF as a child soldier.
- Bones (TV Series) episode "The Survivor in the Soap" investigates the death of an immigrant and child soldier from war-torn Sierra Leone who was granted asylum in the United States as a young teenager in order to start a new life. Booth, Sweets and Brennan are confronted by the horrors of the Sierra Leone Civil War as they interview a traumatized war photographer and try to find the victim's friend, who had fled Sierra Leone and is in the US illegally.

=== Film ===
- Cry Freetown is a 2000 documentary film directed by Sorious Samura. It is an account of the victims of the Sierra Leone Civil War and depicts the most brutal period with the Revolutionary United Front (RUF) rebels capturing the capital city (January 1999).
- In the 2005 movie Lord of War, the protagonist played by Nicolas Cage sells weapons to the RUF.
- RUF was featured significantly in the 2006 movie Blood Diamond starring Leonardo DiCaprio. In this film, RUF is used largely to create the social climate in which the film is set, and the (fictional) depicted commanders of the group are the main antagonists and villains of the story.
- The 2010 film Predators is about a group of the most dangerous people on Earth who are taken to an alien planet to be hunted; one of them is a member of RUF named Mombasa, portrayed by Mahershala Ali.
- The 2012 documentary Life does not lose its value focuses on the reintegration of former child soldiers, after they have lived years in the forest with the RUF rebels.

=== Books ===
- The RUF's activities also formed the central focus of the autobiographical book A Long Way Gone: Memoirs of a Boy Soldier by Ishmael Beah which was published in 2007.

=== Music ===
- Kanye West released a song called Diamonds from Sierra Leone in his album Late Registration, West later remixed the song alongside Jay-Z.

== See also ==
- Sobel (Sierra Leone)
