= Mende people =

Ethnic group in Sierra Leone

Mende
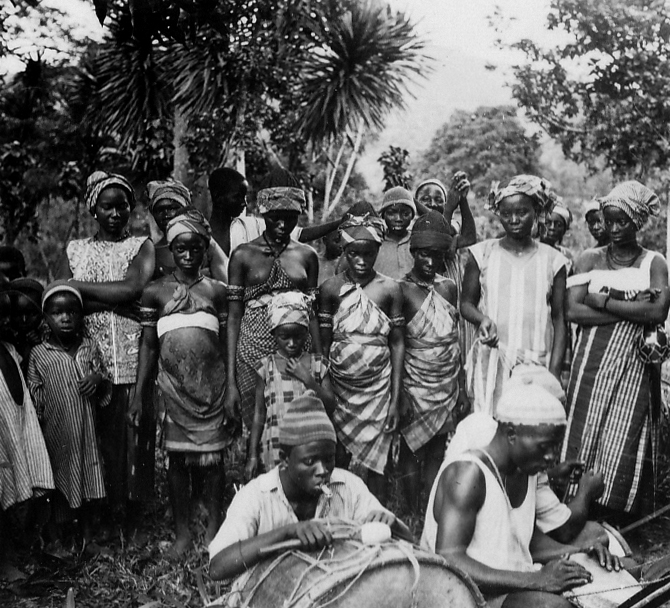
- Mende musicians in 1936

Regions with significant populations
- 2,108,232 Sierra Leone (Bo District, Bonthe District, Moyamba District, Pujehun District, Kenema District, Kailahun District, Western Area); 46,413Liberia

Languages
- Mende • English • Krio

Religion
- Islam 68% • Christianity 30% • Traditional 2%

Related ethnic groups
- Vai, Gbandi, Gola, Kpelle, Loko, and Loma people

The Mende are one of the two largest ethnic groups in Sierra Leone; their neighbours, the Temne people, constitute the largest ethnic group at 35.5% of the total population, which is slightly larger than the Mende at 31.2%. The Mende are predominantly found in the Southern Province and the Eastern Province. The Mende are mostly farmers and hunters. Some of the major cities with significant Mende populations include Bo, Kenema, Kailahun, and Moyamba.

Like a majority of African nations, Sierra Leone's political parties are often tied to specific ethnic groups and have been dominated by the Mende, on the one hand, and the Temne and their long-time political allies, the Limba, on the other. The Mende are known to typically support the Sierra Leone People's Party (SLPP), while the Temnes and Limbas are associated with the All People's Congress party (APC).

== History ==
In their oral tradition, the Mende describe themselves as being a mixture of two peoples: their original members were hunters and fishers who sparsely populated the area in small peaceful settlements, and their leaders came later, in a recent historical period, bringing with them the arts of war, and also building larger, more permanent villages. This is supported by analyses of their language and culture, which show signs of a layering of two different forms; they have both matrilineal and patrilineal inheritance, for instance. These leaders described in oral histories were almost certainly Mane people who descended into the coastal lowlands from the area near Moussadou, Guinea in the 16th century. They conquered and mixed with the native Bullom people to form the Mende.

Regional warfare throughout the 19th century led to the capture and sale of many Mende-speakers into slavery. Most notable were those found aboard the Amistad in 1839. They eventually won their freedom and were repatriated. This event involved fifty-two free Mende people, stolen by Portuguese slavers in 1839, who were shipped via the Middle Passage to Havana, Cuba, where they were sold to Cuban sugar plantation owners, José Ruiz and Pedro Montes.

After working the plantation, they were placed on the schooner Amistad and shipped to another Cuban plantation. On the way, they escaped their bondage and were led in a rebellion by Sengbe Pieh. They told the crew to return them to Africa. Their efforts to return home were frustrated by the ship's remaining crew, who navigated up to the United States. The ship was intercepted off Long Island, New York, by a U.S. Coastal brig. The Cubans merchants Ruiz and Montes denounced the Mende and asserted that they were their property. The ensuing case, heard in Hartford and New Haven, Connecticut, affirmed that the captives were free, and resulted in the return of the thirty-six surviving Mende to their homes.

== Language ==
The Mende people speak the Mende language (also called Boumpe, Hulo, Kossa, or Kosso), which belongs to the Mande language branch of the proposed Niger-Congo language family. In the 1930s African-American linguist Lorenzo Dow Turner found a Gullah family in coastal Georgia that had preserved an ancient song in the Mende language ("A waka"), passing it down for 200 years. In the 1990s three modern researchers – Joseph Opala, Cynthia Schmidt, and Tazieff Koroma — located a Mende village in Sierra Leone where the same song is still sung today. The story of this Mende song, and its survival in both Africa and the US, is chronicled in the documentary film The Language You Cry In.

== Traditional social structure ==
The Mende are divided into five clans: the Kpa-Mende, who are predominantly in the Moyamba district to the south; the Golah-Mende, who inhabit the Gola forest between Kenema and Pujehun districts into Liberia; Sewa-Mende, who settled along the Sewa River; the Vai-Mende, who are also in Liberia and the Pujehun district of Sierra Leone; and the Koh-Mende, who are a dominant tribe in Kailahun district.

The Mende traditionally live in villages of 70 to 250 residents, which are situated from 1.5 to 5 kilometers apart. There is little or no mechanization over the greater part of rural Mende country. Mende farmers use hoes and machetes, but few other tools. The Mende are generally known as growers of rice and several other crops, practicing crop rotation to protect soil productivity. Coffee, cocoa, and ginger are grown as cash crops, whereas rice, pepper, groundnuts, beniseed (also known as sesame seeds), and palm oil are grown for local consumption. Rice cooperatives have been formed in some rural areas.

Traditionally, Mende farming has been carried out by labour groups organised on a local basis and moving from farm to farm (NIIP, 1973). Work is divided by gender: men attend to the heavy work of clearing the land for planting rice, while women clean and pound rice, fish, and weed the planted crops. This routine is followed during ten months of every year, with a couple of months left around the New Year, when they can spend more time in the village engaging in domestic pursuits like house building.

The Mende are patrilineal, patrilocal, and polygamous. The household unit is represented by at least one man and perhaps several of his brothers, with all of their wives and children. One or more brothers and married sisters usually leave sooner or later and are incorporated into other residential units. The senior male has moral authority—the right to respect and obedience—over the family as a whole, especially with regard to the negotiation of debts, damages, and bride-wealth.

== Secret societies ==
=== Poro society ===
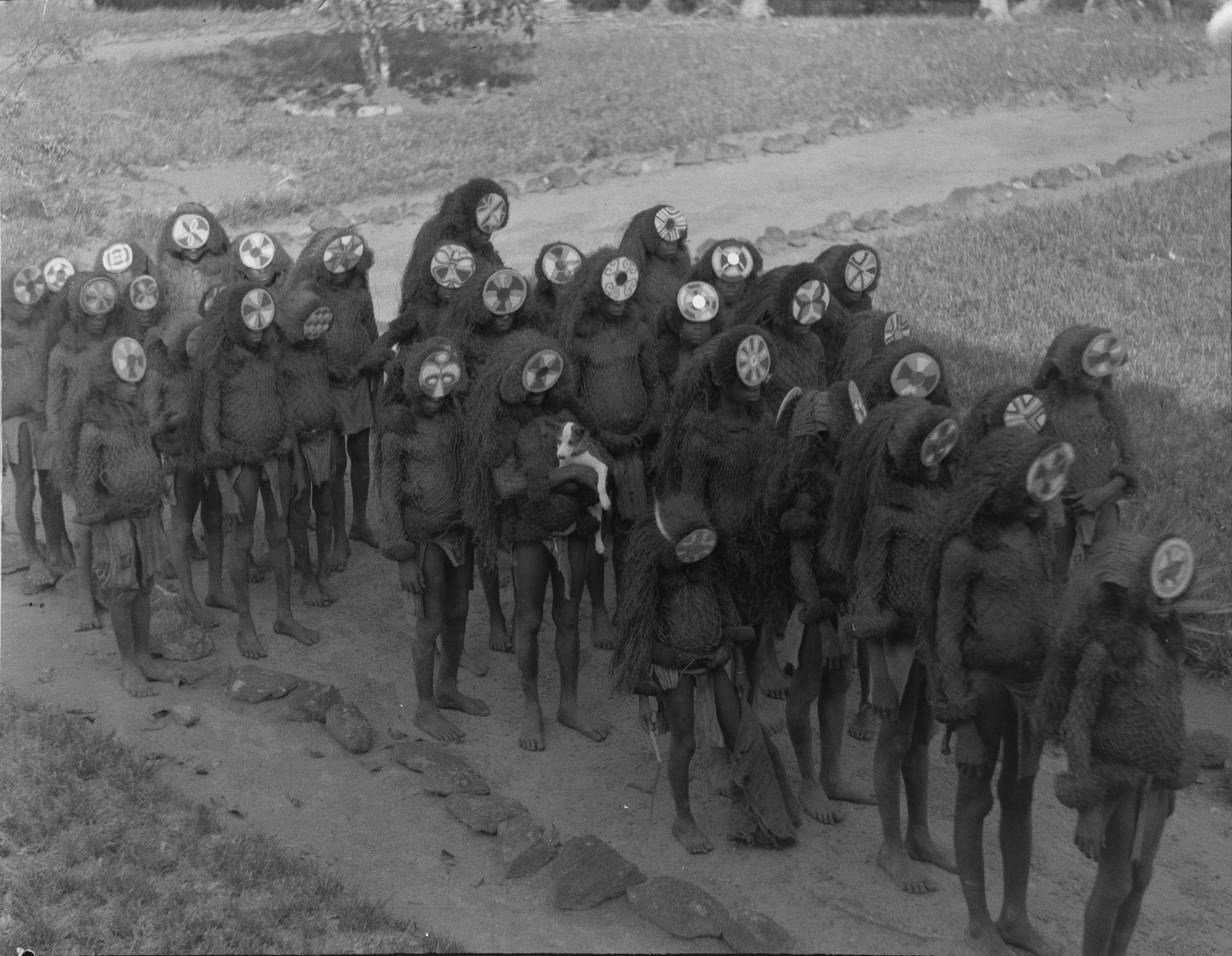
Boys returning from their initiation in the Poro, 1936. Photo by Sjoerd Hofstra

The greatest sins a Mende man can commit is to give away the secrets of their tribe. The Poro society is the male equivalent to the female Sande society. When inducted into this society, Mende boys are initiated into manhood. Many of their rituals parallel those of the Sande society.

During their training, the initiates learn everything that is essential for the survival of the community. The process is described as being reborn, transformed, and—during a masquerade—as being "regurgitated" into fully socialized adult men.

The Poro prepares men for leadership in the community, so they might attain wisdom, accept responsibility, and gain power. It begins with the child's grade of discovery, followed by extensive training and service. During the seven-year initiation period, the young men converse with each other using a secret language and passwords, known only to other Poro members. The member always knows and understands what is being said. This is part of the mystery of this secret society.

At the beginning, young men aged 20 are called into the society and are trained by the group above them, along with a few elders. There is much work to be done during the initiation process. Dancing the masks is part of this work, but not the most important part. Only through work does the dance of the mask become meaningful.

The Mende have always had a remarkable enthusiasm for secret societies. According to Kenneth Little, writing in the 1960s, even the prevalence of Poro societies was far more widespread among Mende than Temne.

=== Sande society ===
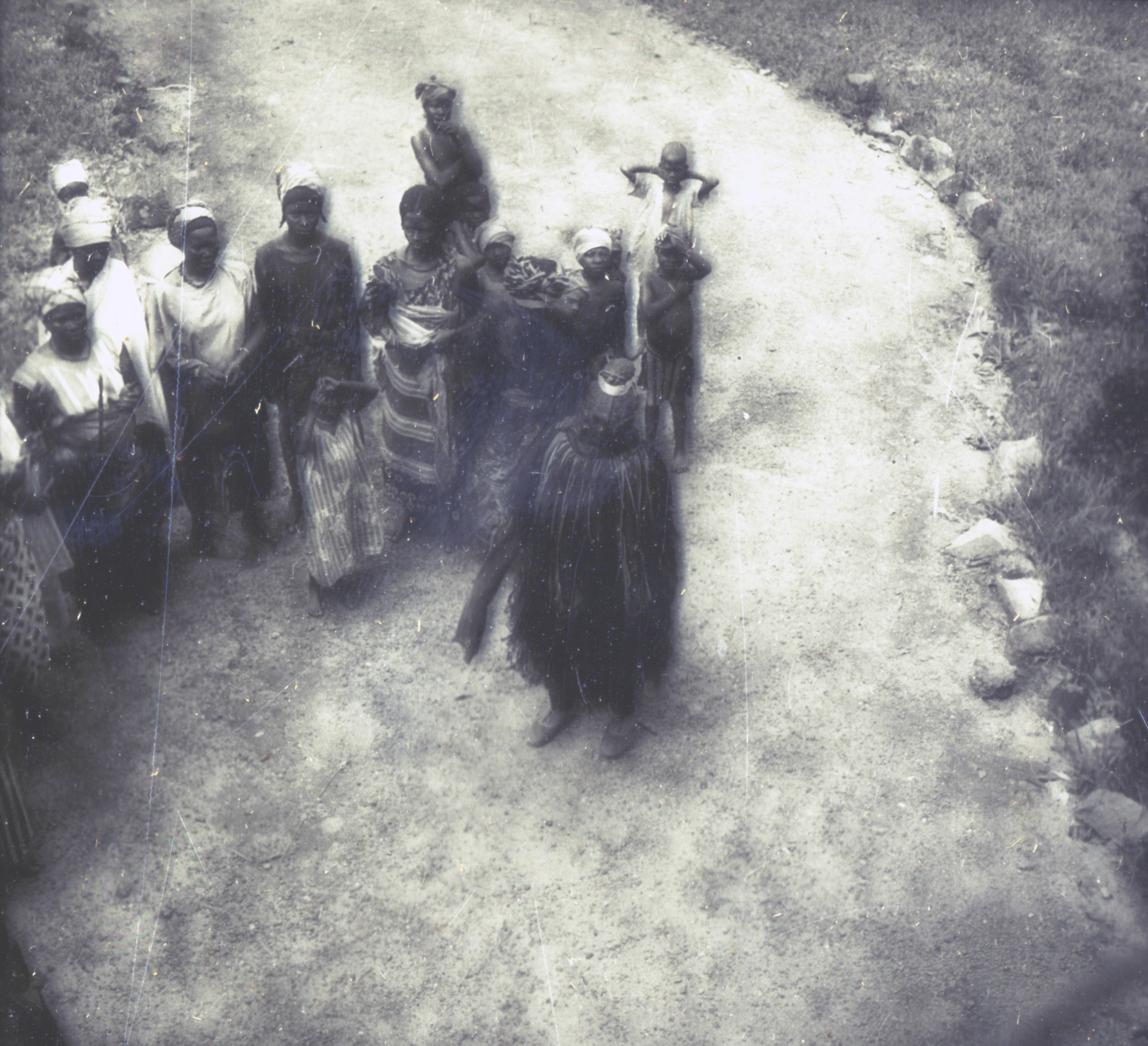
Mende women with a masked Sande society leader.

All Mende women when they reach puberty begin the initiation process into the Sande society. The goals of this secret society are to teach young Mende women the responsibilities of adulthood. The girls are taught to be hardworking and modest in their behavior, especially towards their elders. Sande influences every aspect of a Mende woman's life; it is present before birth and still present after.

Sande is the guardian of women: their protector and guide through life. It is Sande that grants a woman with an identity and a personality. The Sande society is concerned with defining what it is to be human and with discovering the ways of promoting love, justice, and harmony. It is a moral philosophy that focuses on the perpetual refinement of the individual.

Sande leaders serve as models to women in the community. They exemplify the highest of Mende ideals, and they have the duty of enforcing positive social relationships and of removing any harm that might come to women in their community. "This is Sande; women together in their womanhood, in a free exchange of words and actions among sisters. Wherever two or three women are gathered together, there is the spirit of Sande."

Sande groups conduct masked performances that embody the Sande guardian spirit, who is associated with water and rivers. Descriptions of the society and its masquerade events have been made by visitors since the seventeenth century.

=== Sande hierarchy ===
The Sande society is organized by a hierarchy a number of positions all around. The sowie are the highest-ranking leaders of the group. It is their job to model to the Mende women the most important Mende social values. It is also their duty to enforce proper social relationships and to remove anything that might be harmful to the women in their community.

The sowie have control over certain sacred knowledge that is essential to the development of success and happiness in an individual, and also to the well-being of the community. They are the experts of the Sande women and have access to spirit ancestors and forces of nature.

The rank below sowie is ligba. There are two grades within ligba; Ligba Wa (senior) and Ligba Wulo (junior). In any group there is only one Ligba Wa; she is an executive officer in Sande. Before a woman can take a leadership role in artistic activities she must be eligible at least as a Ligba Wulo.

An ordinary member is referred to as nyaha. The word indicates that the Sande initiation makes a woman of a child, and every woman into a wife. An initiate in training is called mbogdoni. A non-member is kpowa. As a noun kpowa means "an ignoramus, stupid, retarded, a fool" as a verb it means "to become insane or deranged."

== Female culture ==
=== Arts ===
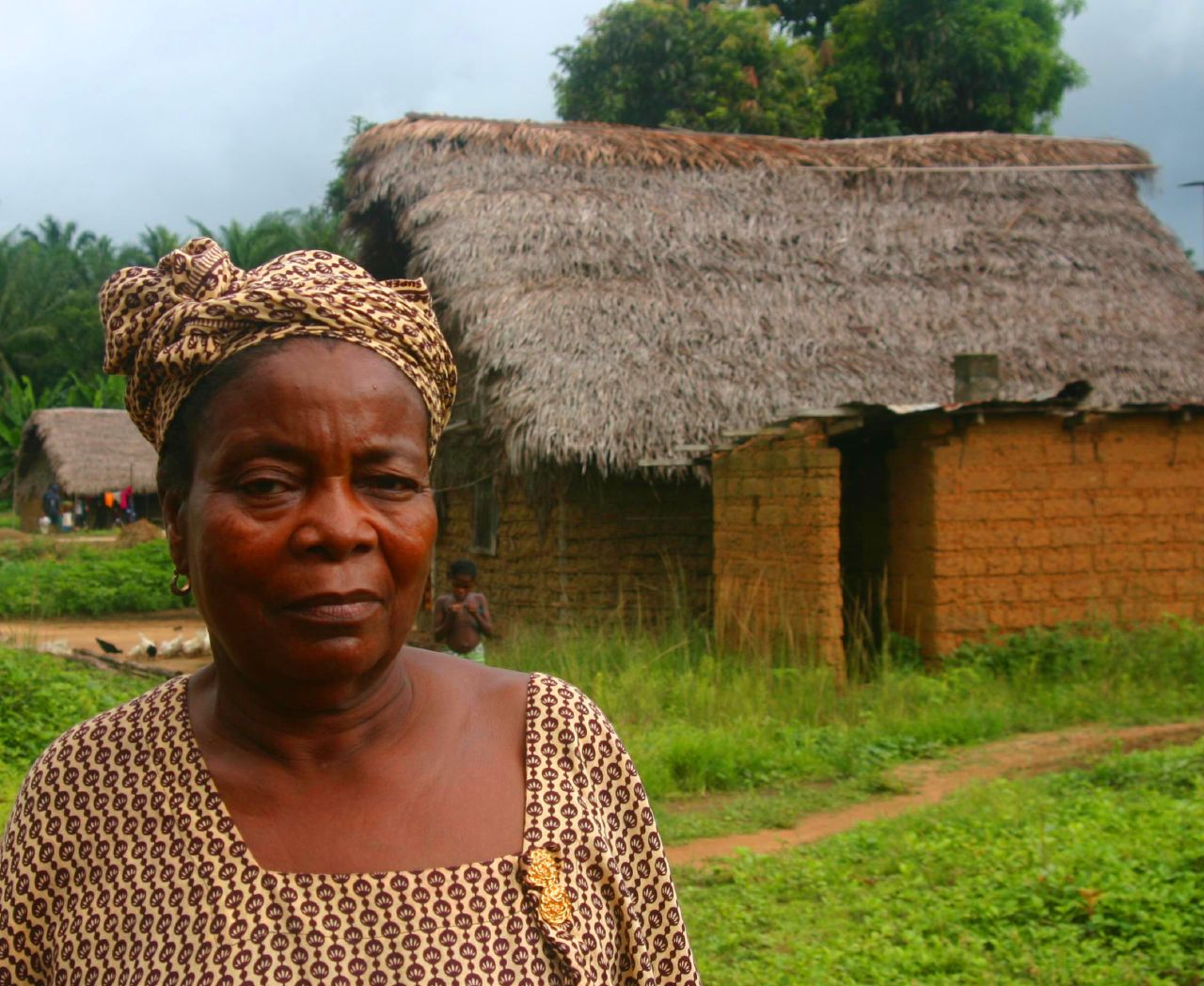
A Mende woman in the village of Njama quee in Moyamba District.

Much Mende art is in the form of jewelry and carvings. The masks associated with the fraternal and sorority associations of the Marka and the Mende are probably the best-known and finely crafted in the region. The Mende also produce beautifully woven fabrics which are popular throughout western Africa, and gold and silver necklaces, bracelets, armlets, and earrings.

The bells on the necklaces are of the type believed capable of being heard by spirits, ringing in both worlds, that of the ancestors and the living. Mende hunters often wear a single bell that can be easily silenced when stealth is necessary. Women, on the other hand, often wear multiple bells, referring to concepts of community, since the bells ring harmoniously together.

==== Mende masks ====
Masks are the collective Mind of Mende community; viewed as one body, they are the Spirit of the Mende people. The Mende masked figures are a reminder that human beings have a dual existence; they live in the concrete world of flesh and material things and the spirit world of dreams, faith, aspirations and imagination.

The features of a Mende mask convey Mende ideals of female morality and physical beauty. They are unusual because the masks are worn by women. The bird on top of the head represents a woman's natural intuition that lets her see and know things that others can't. The high or broad forehead represents good luck or the sharp, contemplative mind of the ideal Mende woman. Downcast eyes symbolize a spiritual nature and it is through these small slits that a woman wearing the mask would look out of. The small mouth signifies the ideal woman's quiet and humble character. The markings on the cheeks are representative of the decorative scars girls receive as they step into womanhood. The scars are a symbol of her new, harder life. The neck rolls are an indication of the health of an ideal woman. They have also been called symbols of the pattern of concentric, circular ripples the Mende spirit makes when emerging from the water.

In the Mende culture, full-figured women are beautiful. The intricate hairstyles reveal the close ties within a community of women. The holes at the base of the mask are where the rest of the costume is attached. A woman who wears these masks must not expose any part of her body or a vengeful spirit may take possession of her. Women often cover their bodies with masses of raffia or black cloth.

When a girl becomes initiated into the Sande society, the village's master woodcarver creates a special mask just for her. Helmet masks are made from a section of tree trunk, often of the kpole (cotton) tree, and then carved and hollowed to fit over the wearer's head and face. The woodcarver must wait until he has a dream that guides him to make the mask a certain way for the recipient. A mask must be kept hidden in a secret place when no one is wearing it.

These masks appear not only in initiation rituals but also at important events such as funerals, arbitrations and the installation of chiefs. Examples of these masks appear in museums. Various Mende masks, specifically Sowei Masks, were the focus of a 2013 exhibition in the British Museum, exploring the Sowei traditions.

=== Dancing ===
Learning dance is a harsh discipline that every Mende girl must tackle. Girls practice for hours at a time until they drop from exhaustion. Ndoli jowei, the expert in dancing, is in charge of teaching young Mende girls to dance. When girls make a mistake in the steps, they are whipped with a switch until they get it right.

Often girls are awoken in the middle of the night to practice the dance; sometimes they are forced to stay awake for nearly 48 hours dancing almost the entire time. By the end of their training, the girls have transformed into young woman who are tough and confident even in the harshest of conditions. They are in healthy shape and have endurance and stamina.

==== The role of Gonde ====
The traditional character of Gonde is also a Ndoli jowei or dance instructor, but rather than a harsh enforcer, she acts as the comic relief. Gonde becomes a friend to the initiates, amusing them to help them forget the hard ordeals they are going through. She coaches the slower dancers, encouraging them to work hard. "Gonde is a funny, lovable character who lightens the gloom and reminds everyone that Sande is not always so deadly serious."

==== Ndoli jowei ====
Ndoli jowei is the principal spirit for celebration, although she also appears on other occasions besides celebrations. In Sande initiation, there are three major events in which the ndoli jowei appear publicly. The first occurs 1–3 days after the initiates have been taken into the bush to be circumcised. This event is known as yaya gbegbi.

At this time the ndoli jowei comes into town with a group of Sande women while the initiates stay in the bush recovering from their operations. The women come into town to tell men they have initiated people into Sande. They go through the town waving leaves and gathering food and other supplies that they need.

Ndoli jowei does not dance on this occasion because it is not yet time for celebration. She is there only as a reminder of the powerful medicine which has been summoned by the Sande session. This validates the unruly behavior of the Sande women.

The next time ndoli jowei appears is at a minor feast called Kpete gbula yombo le or Sowo mba yili gbi. At this occasion, an announcement is made to inform people of the date for the gani celebration; which is the last event of the Sande initiation that ndoli jowei appears at. At this time, the new initiates are brought into town for the first time since the initiation process began; accompanied by ndoli jowei. This is a happy occasion where dances are performed by both the maskers and the initiates.

Ndoli jowei masks can be found in various museums. The British Museum has a raffia and cotton wood mask in its possession. The estimated date of production of this particular mask is between 1880 and 1886. It has been part of numerous exhibitions. Previous exhibitions of the British Museum's Ndoli Jowei piece are as follows:

- 2019 - Hong Kong - Hong Kong Heritage Museum, A History of the World in 100 Objects
- 2018: Valenciennes, France - Musée des Beaux-Arts, A History of the World in 100 Objects
- 2017: Beijing, China - National Museum of China, A History of the World in 100 Objects
- 2017: Shanghai, China - Shanghai Museum, A History of the World in 100 Objects
- 2016: Perth, Australia - Western Australian Museum, A History of the World in 100 Objects
- 2016: Canberra, Australia - National Museum of Australia, A History of the World in 100 Objects
- 2015: Tokyo, Japan - Metropolitan Art Museum A History of the World in 100 Objects
- 2015: Dazaifu, Japan - Kyushu National Museum, A History of the World in 100 Objects
- 2015: Kobe City Museum, Kobe, Japan A History of the World in 100 Objects
- 2015: Taipei, Taiwan - National Palace Museum, A History of the World in 100 Objects
- 2014: Dubai - Manarat Al Saadiyat, Abu Dhabi, A History of the World in 100 Objects

=== White clay ===
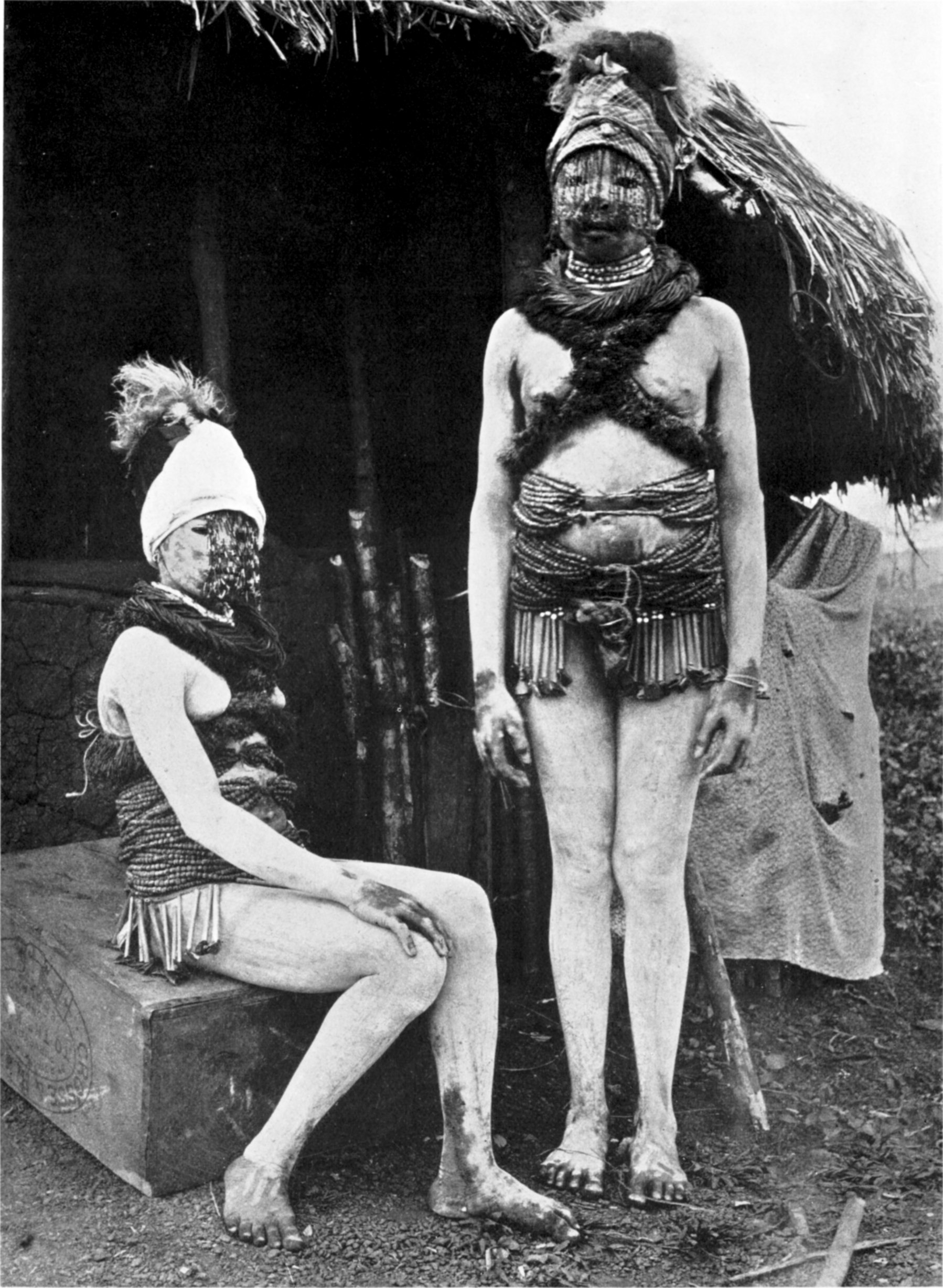
Sande society initiates marked with white clay and animal fat, called Hojo or Wojeh.

Hojo is a white clay that Mende women use to mark their territory. The clay comes from the water like many other aspects of Sande. Its smooth, shiny surface reflects light, making it eye-catching. Hojo is found in a scale of colors from beige to pure white. The pure white Hojo is rarer, found only deep beneath the surface of the water. Hojo and Sande are parallel in that they are both well hidden and secretive in its purest form.

White is the color of Sande. To the Mende, the pureness of white signifies the cleanliness and absence of imperfections. "It shows a 'harmlessness'; it is void of all things evil and is thus 'a positive and helpful' color." White is symbolic of the spirit world and also of the secret parts of society where people aim for the highest standards.

Objects and people who are marked with Hojo are under Sande protection and control. They are subject to the authority of Sande law and punishment. Initiates are colored with this white clay to show that they are the property of Sande. This signifies that they are under the protection of Sande and should not be fooled with. Sowei, the judge of women, wears white to represent clear thinking and justice.

=== Hair ===
A woman's hair is a sign of femininity. Both thickness and length are elements that are admired by the Mende. Thickness means the woman has more individual strands of hair and the length is proof of strength. It takes time, care and patience to grow a beautiful, full head of hair. Ideas about hair root women to nature, the way hair grows is compared to the way forests grow.

The vegetation on earth is the "hair" on the head of Mother Nature in the same way the hair on the head of a woman is her "foliage." (Boone) A woman with long, thick hair illustrates a life force, she may be blessed with a green thumb giving her the ability to have a promising farm and many healthy children.

Hairstyles are very important in Mende society. A Mende woman's hair must be groomed, clean, and oiled. Hair must be tied down under strict control and shaped into intricate, styles for the sake of beauty and sex appeal. Dirty, disheveled hair is a sign of insanity. A woman who does not groom and maintain her hair has neglected the community's standards of behavior. Only a woman in mourning can let her hair loose. The Mende find unarranged "wild" hair immoral and associate individuals who possess this trait with wild behavior.

=== Female Circumcision ===
A key element of Sande initiation is the clitoridectomy, or female genital mutilation. This surgery is supposed to foreshadow the pain a Mende woman experiences during childbirth. The shock of this experience also tests a Mende woman's physical endurance. The shared pain of the clitoridectomy creates permanent bonds among the initiates. Vows that express a social bond are taken after the operation; these vows are a metaphor for the support the women will have during the pains of childbirth.

This procedure is considered necessary to change Mende children, who are considered to be of neutral sex before the procedure, to heterosexual, gendered adults. Traditional female circumcision is thought to remove the female's residue of maleness.

=== Neck rings ===
The neck rings at the base of the mask are an exaggeration of actual neck creases. Mende people consider a beautiful neck to be one with rings as it shows adolescent girls becoming ready for childbearing by the increase in body fat. The rings indicate prosperity and wholesome living, and are given by God to show his affection for a fortunate few.

The rings also indicate a relationship with the divine: the Sowo itself is a deity from the waters, and the neck rings represent the concentric waves that are formed on still water by Sowo's head breaking through the surface. The spirit comes from the water, and what the human eye sees on the necks of women "is human in form, but divine in essence", as portrayed in the mask.

== Kikakui syllabary ==
The Mende Kikakui script was invented in 1917 by Muhamad Turay and popularized by his son-in-law Kisimi Kamara (c. 1890–1962), a Kuranko man in Sierra Leone. During the 1920s and 1930s, he ran a school in southern Sierra Leone to teach 'Ki-ka-ku'. The syllabary became a popular method of keeping records and writing letters and achieved widespread use for a time. During the 1940s, the British set up the Protectorate Literacy Bureau in the city of Bo to teach the Mende to read and write with an alphabet based on the Latin script, and Kikakui's use declined. The Mende script has been described as a "failed script".

American historian Konrad Tuchscherer, while researching his Ph.D. thesis for the School of Oriental and African Studies in London during Sierra Leone's civil war, found that instead of impeding his research the war actually advanced it. Thousands of Mendes were taking shelter in huge refugee camps surrounding the cities of Bo and Kenema, and the people living in those camps were organized according to their home chiefdoms, making it possible for Tuchscherer to survey the entire Mende region (about half of Sierra Leone's territory) in a small space and a short period of time. He found that the Mende syllabary, far from being forgotten, was still being used by quite a few people, mostly elderly men.

== Politics ==
The politics of Sierra Leone have traditionally been dominated by the Mende. The Sierra Leone People's Party (SLPP), which is one of the two major political parties in the country, is predominantly based among the Mende people. The SLPP gets most of its support in Mende- predominate south-east region of Sierra Leone.

Most of the country's top government positions have been held by the Mende. Sierra Leone's first Prime minister Sir Milton Margai, who led the country to independence from the United Kingdom on April 27, 1961 was a prominent member of the Mende ethnic group. Other prominent Sierra Leonean politicians from the Mende ethnic group include the country's second prime minister Sir Albert Margai, who was also the younger brother of Milton Margai; former commander of the Republic of Sierra Leone Armed Forces and former Sierra Leone's head of state Brigadier David Lansana; former Sierra Leone's vice president Albert Joe Demby; former Sierra Leone's vice president and attorney general Solomon Berewa.

Former Sierra Leone's vice president minister of Justice and Attorney General Francis Minah and Samuel Hinga Norman, who was Sierra Leone's minister of Defense and former leader of the militant group the Civil Defense Forces (commonly known as the Kamajors). Sierra Leonean politician Charles Margai, who is the leader of one of the country's main opposition party the People's Movement for Democratic Change (PMDC). He is also the son of former prime minister Albert Margai and the nephew of Milton Margai; and former Sierra Leone's minister of finance John Oponjo Benjamin, who is currently the National Leader of the Sierra Leone People's Party (SLPP).

== Women's political influence in Mende society ==
The Mende are a well-documented example of a non-western, pre-industrial society in which, at least historically, women took more political leadership positions relative to men. In the pre-colonial era, the Mende had female chiefs and war leaders. One such female chief, Madam Yoko (1849–1906), was the leader of the vast Kpa Mende Confederacy. She was formally recognized by the British as a Paramount Chief in 1894, ruling an area that was eventually divided into fourteen chiefdoms.

Although it is impossible to know the extent to which other Mende women rose to leadership positions comparable to Madam Yoko's, historians believe that perhaps fifteen to twenty percent of the local leaders with whom the British negotiated at the time of colonial consolidation were women. The pattern continues to this day. According to MacCormack, "Contemporary women paramount chiefs are equally prominent, and their political influence now extends into national and international arenas. In 1988, thirteen of the 146 paramount chiefs were female."

MacCormack further notes, "There is a tendency in Western culture to define women as weak and needing protection, since they bear children. In West Africa [sic] the same biological facts are given a different cultural interpretation. The bearing of children demonstrates that women are strong and active agents in a society, capable of holding political office." Lynda Rose Day, another authority on Mende female chiefs, writes that "Women rise naturally to leadership positions when they are senior wives in large polygynous households, when they are the oldest living relatives of a large landholding descent group, or when they are heads of local Sande chapters. Mothers with many children are seen as strong, capable authority figures."

== Notable people ==
=== Politicians ===
- John Oponjo Benjamin, former leader of the Sierra Leone People's Party (SLPP) and Finance minister of Sierra Leone from 2002 to 2007.
- Solomon Ekuma Berewa, former Vice-President of Sierra Leone from 2002 to 2007 and former Sierra Leone's Attorney General.
- Augustine Bockarie, member of parliament of Sierra Leone representing Kono District.
- Sam Bockarie, former leader of the Revolutionary United Front indicted for war crimes.
- Joseph B. Dauda, former Sierra Leone minister of finance, former member of parliament and former minister of trade.
- Albert Joe Demby, former vice-president of Sierra Leone.
- Joseph Ganda, Sierra Leonean Archbishop.
- Shirley Gbujama, Sierra Leone Minister of Foreign Affairs from 1996 to 1997 and Sierra Leone minister of social welfare Gender and Children Affairs from 2002 to 2007.
- Ella Koblo Gulama, the first woman to be elected in the parliament of Sierra Leone and the first woman to be elected as cabinet minister of Sierra Leone.
- Septimus Kaikai, Sierra Leone minister of Information and Communication from 2002 to 2007
- John Karimu, former Sierra Leone minister of Finance and former Commissioner of the Sierra Leone National Revenue Authority (NRA.)
- Coretta Scott King, who was the wife of Martin Luther King Jr, is believed to have heritage with the Mende people of Sierra Leone.
- Allieu Kondewa, former commander of the Civil Defence Forces and convicted war criminal.
- Bernadette Lahai, Sierra Leonean politician and currently a member of Parliament representing Kenema District.
- David Lansana, former Head of State of Sierra Leone, convicted of treason and subsequently executed.
- Albert Margai, second prime minister of Sierra Leone from 1964 to 1967; the brother of Sir Milton Margai and father of Charles Margai.
- Charles Francis Margai, Sierra Leonean politician and leader of the People's Movement for Democratic Change (PMDC) political party.
- Milton Margai, Sierra Leone's first prime minister from 1961 to 1964.
- Francis Minah, Sierra Leone's minister of Justice and Attorney General from 1978 to 1985 and Sierra Leone's vice president from 1985 to 1987. Convicted of treason and subsequently executed.
- Mary Musa, current mayor of Koidu.
- Solomon Musa, vice chairman of the NPRC, a military government that ruled Sierra Leone from 1992 to 1996.
- Samuel Hinga Norman, founder and leader of the Civil Defence Forces, indicted for war crimes.
- Joe Robert Pemagbi, current Sierra Leone ambassador to the United Nations.
- Bindi Hindowa Samba, paramount chief of Bo District.
- Hindolo Trye, former Sierra Leone Minister of Tourism and Cultural Affairs.
- David Woobay, current mayor and Council Chairman of Moyamba.

=== Entertainers ===
- Emmerson Amidu Bockarie, Sierra Leonean musician.
- Isata Mahoi, Sierra Leonean actress.
- Sahr Ngaujah, actor and director.

=== Football stars ===
- Patrick Bantamoi, Sierra Leonean football player.
- Issa Kallon
- Kemokai Kallon, former Sierra Leonean football player.
- Mohamed Kallon, Sierra Leonean football player.
- Musa Kallon, former Sierra Leonean football player.
- Sahr Lahai, Sierra Leonean football player.
- Alpha Lansana, Sierra Leonean football player.
- Mustapha Sama, Sierra Leonean football player.
- Gibrilla Woobay, Sierra Leonean football player.
- Osman Yunis, Sierra Leonean football player.
- Sullay Kaikai, Sierra Leone football player.
- Tejan Koroma, American football player
- Winston Ceesay

=== Others ===
- Augustine Gbao, former leader of the Revolutionary United Front and convicted war criminal
- Moinina Fofana, former commander of the Civil Defense Forces and convicted war criminal
- Joseph Cinqué, born Sengbe Pieh, victim of the Atlantic slave trade and leader of the rebellion on ship The Amistad. Tried and freed in the trial United States v. The Amistad.
- Justin Mensah-Coker, rugby union player.

=== In Fiction ===
- Lady Agatha Danbury, In the Bridgerton series, is said to be descended from the Kpa-Mende Bo Tribe in Queen Charlotte: A Bridgerton Story.
