= Bockarie =

Bockarie is a common surname among the Mende people of Sierra Leone. Notable people with the surname include:

- Augustine Bockarie, Sierra Leone politician
- Sam Bockarie, former Sierra Leone rebel leader
- Emmerson Amidu Bockarie, Sierra Leone musician
