= Mende Kikakui (Unicode block) =

- Range: U+1E800..U+1E8DF (224 code points)
- Plane: SMP
- Scripts: Mende Kikakui
- Major alphabets: Kikakui
- Assigned: 213 code points
- Unused: 11 reserved code points

Unicode version history
- 7.0 (2014): 213 (+213)

Unicode documentation
- Code chart ∣ Web page

Mende Kikakui is a Unicode block containing the Kikakui characters for writing the Mende language.

Mende Kikakui^{[1]}^{[2]} Official Unicode Consortium code chart (PDF)
	0	1	2	3	4	5	6	7	8	9	A	B	C	D	E	F
U+1E80x	𞠀	𞠁	𞠂	𞠃	𞠄	𞠅	𞠆	𞠇	𞠈	𞠉	𞠊	𞠋	𞠌	𞠍	𞠎	𞠏
U+1E81x	𞠐	𞠑	𞠒	𞠓	𞠔	𞠕	𞠖	𞠗	𞠘	𞠙	𞠚	𞠛	𞠜	𞠝	𞠞	𞠟
U+1E82x	𞠠	𞠡	𞠢	𞠣	𞠤	𞠥	𞠦	𞠧	𞠨	𞠩	𞠪	𞠫	𞠬	𞠭	𞠮	𞠯
U+1E83x	𞠰	𞠱	𞠲	𞠳	𞠴	𞠵	𞠶	𞠷	𞠸	𞠹	𞠺	𞠻	𞠼	𞠽	𞠾	𞠿
U+1E84x	𞡀	𞡁	𞡂	𞡃	𞡄	𞡅	𞡆	𞡇	𞡈	𞡉	𞡊	𞡋	𞡌	𞡍	𞡎	𞡏
U+1E85x	𞡐	𞡑	𞡒	𞡓	𞡔	𞡕	𞡖	𞡗	𞡘	𞡙	𞡚	𞡛	𞡜	𞡝	𞡞	𞡟
U+1E86x	𞡠	𞡡	𞡢	𞡣	𞡤	𞡥	𞡦	𞡧	𞡨	𞡩	𞡪	𞡫	𞡬	𞡭	𞡮	𞡯
U+1E87x	𞡰	𞡱	𞡲	𞡳	𞡴	𞡵	𞡶	𞡷	𞡸	𞡹	𞡺	𞡻	𞡼	𞡽	𞡾	𞡿
U+1E88x	𞢀	𞢁	𞢂	𞢃	𞢄	𞢅	𞢆	𞢇	𞢈	𞢉	𞢊	𞢋	𞢌	𞢍	𞢎	𞢏
U+1E89x	𞢐	𞢑	𞢒	𞢓	𞢔	𞢕	𞢖	𞢗	𞢘	𞢙	𞢚	𞢛	𞢜	𞢝	𞢞	𞢟
U+1E8Ax	𞢠	𞢡	𞢢	𞢣	𞢤	𞢥	𞢦	𞢧	𞢨	𞢩	𞢪	𞢫	𞢬	𞢭	𞢮	𞢯
U+1E8Bx	𞢰	𞢱	𞢲	𞢳	𞢴	𞢵	𞢶	𞢷	𞢸	𞢹	𞢺	𞢻	𞢼	𞢽	𞢾	𞢿
U+1E8Cx	𞣀	𞣁	𞣂	𞣃	𞣄			𞣇	𞣈	𞣉	𞣊	𞣋	𞣌	𞣍	𞣎	𞣏
U+1E8Dx	𞣐	𞣑	𞣒	𞣓	𞣔	𞣕	𞣖									
Notes: 1. As of Unicode version 16.0; 2. Grey areas indicate non-assigned code points

== History ==
The following Unicode-related documents record the purpose and process of defining specific characters in the Mende Kikakui block:

Version	Final code points (Note: Proposed code points and characters names may differ from final code points and names)	Count	L2 ID	WG2 ID	Document
7.0	U+1E800..1E8C4, 1E8C7..1E8D6	213	L2/10-006	N3757	Everson, Michael (2010-01-23), Preliminary proposal for encoding the Mende script
7.0	U+1E800..1E8C4, 1E8C7..1E8D6	213	L2/10-252	N3863	Everson, Michael (2010-07-28), Proposal for encoding the Mende script in the SMP of the UCS
7.0	U+1E800..1E8C4, 1E8C7..1E8D6	213	L2/11-301R	N4133R	Everson, Michael (2011-10-21), Revised proposal for encoding the Mende script
7.0	U+1E800..1E8C4, 1E8C7..1E8D6	213	L2/12-023	N4167	Everson, Michael; Tuchscherer, Konrad (2012-01-24), Revised proposal for encoding the Mende script in the SMP of the UCS
7.0	U+1E800..1E8C4, 1E8C7..1E8D6	213	L2/12-049		Anderson, Deborah (2012-01-29), Encoding model options for Mende numbers
7.0	U+1E800..1E8C4, 1E8C7..1E8D6	213	L2/12-007		Moore, Lisa (2012-02-14), "C.8", UTC #130 / L2 #227 Minutes
7.0	U+1E800..1E8C4, 1E8C7..1E8D6	213	L2/12-265		Anderson, Deborah (2012-07-20), Request for a decision on encoding model for Mende numbers
7.0	U+1E800..1E8C4, 1E8C7..1E8D6	213	L2/12-293	N4311	Anderson, Deborah (2012-08-01), Proposal for Nine Mende Digit Characters
7.0	U+1E800..1E8C4, 1E8C7..1E8D6	213	L2/12-239		Moore, Lisa (2012-08-14), "C.12, C.12.1", UTC #132 Minutes
7.0	U+1E800..1E8C4, 1E8C7..1E8D6	213		N4253 (pdf, doc)	"M59.11", Unconfirmed minutes of WG 2 meeting 59, 2012-09-12
7.0	U+1E800..1E8C4, 1E8C7..1E8D6	213	L2/12-335	N4375	Everson, Michael (2012-10-23), Mende ad-hoc group report
7.0	U+1E800..1E8C4, 1E8C7..1E8D6	213	L2/12-371	N4377	Suignard, Michel (2012-10-24), Disposition of comments on SC2 N 4239 (PDAM2.2 text to ISO/IEC 10646 3rd edition)
7.0	U+1E800..1E8C4, 1E8C7..1E8D6	213	L2/12-343R2		Moore, Lisa (2012-12-04), "Consensus 133-C9", UTC #133 Minutes
7.0	U+1E800..1E8C4, 1E8C7..1E8D6	213		N4396	Rationale for script name change from Mende to Kikakui, 2013-02-11
7.0	U+1E800..1E8C4, 1E8C7..1E8D6	213		N4353 (pdf, doc)	"M60.05c", Unconfirmed minutes of WG 2 meeting 60, 2013-05-23
7.0	U+1E800..1E8C4, 1E8C7..1E8D6	213	L2/13-132		Moore, Lisa (2013-07-29), "Consensus 136-C9", UTC #136 Minutes, "Approve the change of script name, block name, and the names of all characters for Kikakui to Mende Kikakui (U+1E800..U+1E8DF), for Unicode 7.0."
7.0	U+1E800..1E8C4, 1E8C7..1E8D6	213		N4403 (pdf, doc)	Umamaheswaran, V. S. (2014-01-28), "Resolution M61.01", Unconfirmed minutes of WG 2 meeting 61, Holiday Inn, Vilnius, Lithuania; 2013-06-10/14
7.0	U+1E800..1E8C4, 1E8C7..1E8D6	213	L2/24-065		Blondin, Louka Ménard (2024-04-16), "ID20240310104250 [Affects U+1E899 and U+1E89A]", Editorial Working Group Report and Recommendations for UTC #179 Meeting
7.0	U+1E800..1E8C4, 1E8C7..1E8D6	213	L2/24-061		Constable, Peter (2024-04-29), "Consensus 179-C20", UTC #179 Minutes, "Add two formal name aliases of type 'correction' [Affects U+1E899 and U+1E89A]"
