= Parrega =

Parrega Parregea
- Village
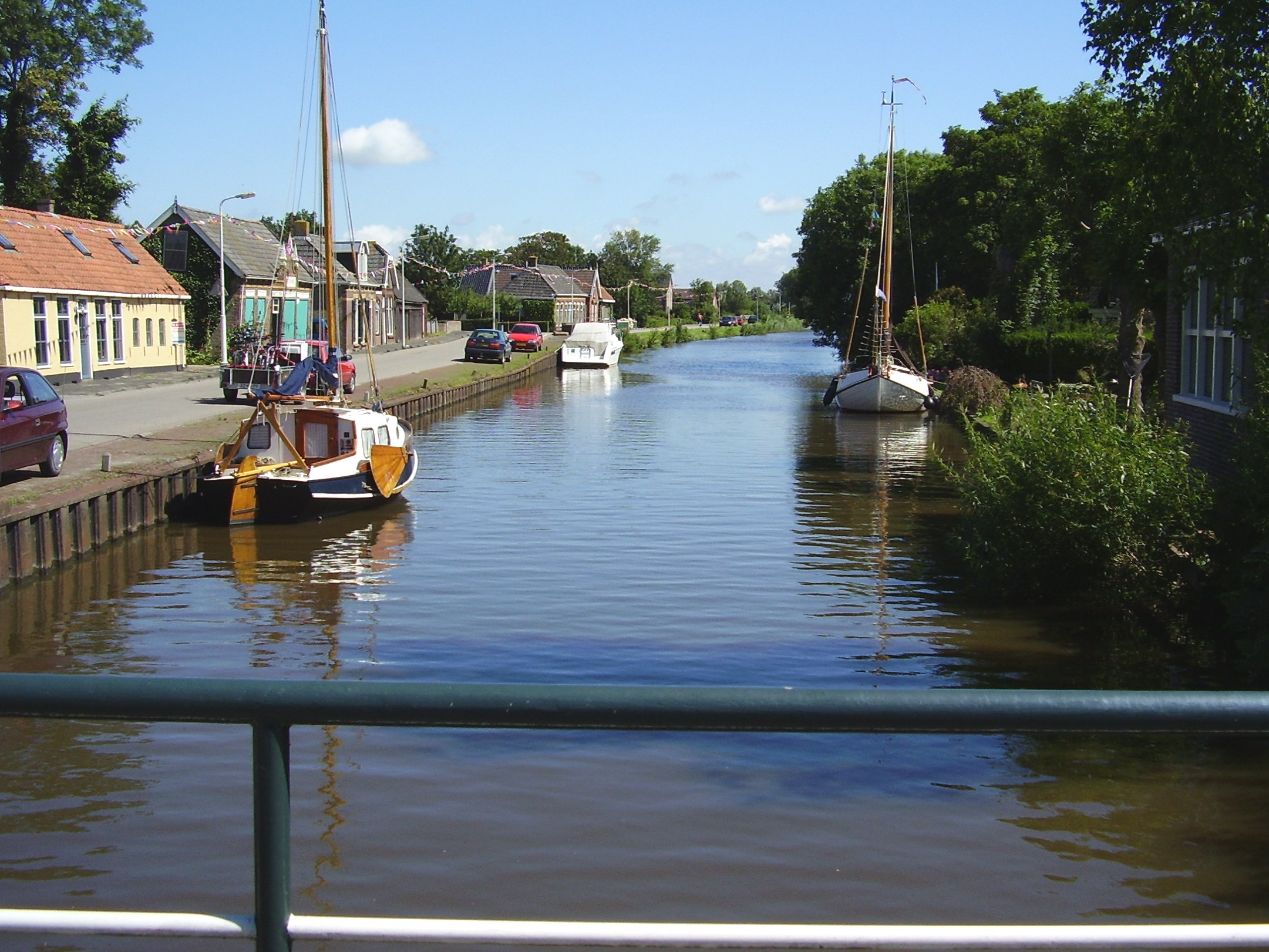
- Workumertrekvaart - The canal in the middle of the village

- Flag Coat of arms

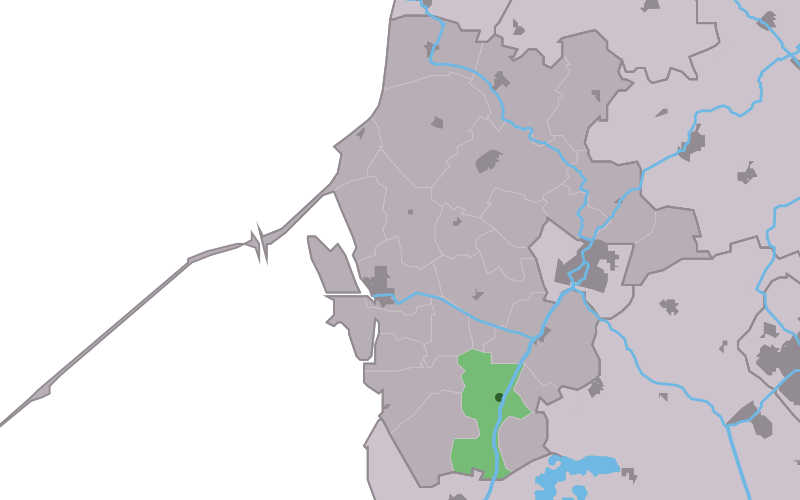
- Location in the former Wûnseradiel municipality

- Location in the Netherlands Parrega (Netherlands)
- Country: Netherlands
- Province: Friesland
- Municipality: Súdwest-Fryslân

Area
  - Total: 9.21 km^{2} (3.56 sq mi)
- Elevation: −0.6 m (−2.0 ft)

Population (2021)
  - Total: 485
  - Density: 52.7/km^{2} (136/sq mi)
- Time zone: UTC+1 (CET)
  - Summer (DST): UTC+2 (CEST)
- Postal code: 8763
- Dialing code: 0515
- Website: Official

Parrega (West Frisian: Parregea) is a village in the municipality Súdwest-Fryslân in the province of Friesland, the Netherlands. It had a population of around 490 in January 2017.

The village is divided by a canal and the only bridge, in the village centre, connects the two parts. Parrega has its own primary school. Most of the children of Parrega, Hieslum and Dedgum are educated at this school. There is also a Community Hall, including sports facilities, called the Gearhing.

== History ==
Parrega was a fishing village, located east of the former Parregaaster Lake, which was reclaimed in 1879. Together with the nearby village of Hieslum it has a more-than-80-year-old Community Society and a 30-year-old village magazine (De Pinfisker).

Before 2011, the village was part of the Wûnseradiel municipality.

== Gallery ==
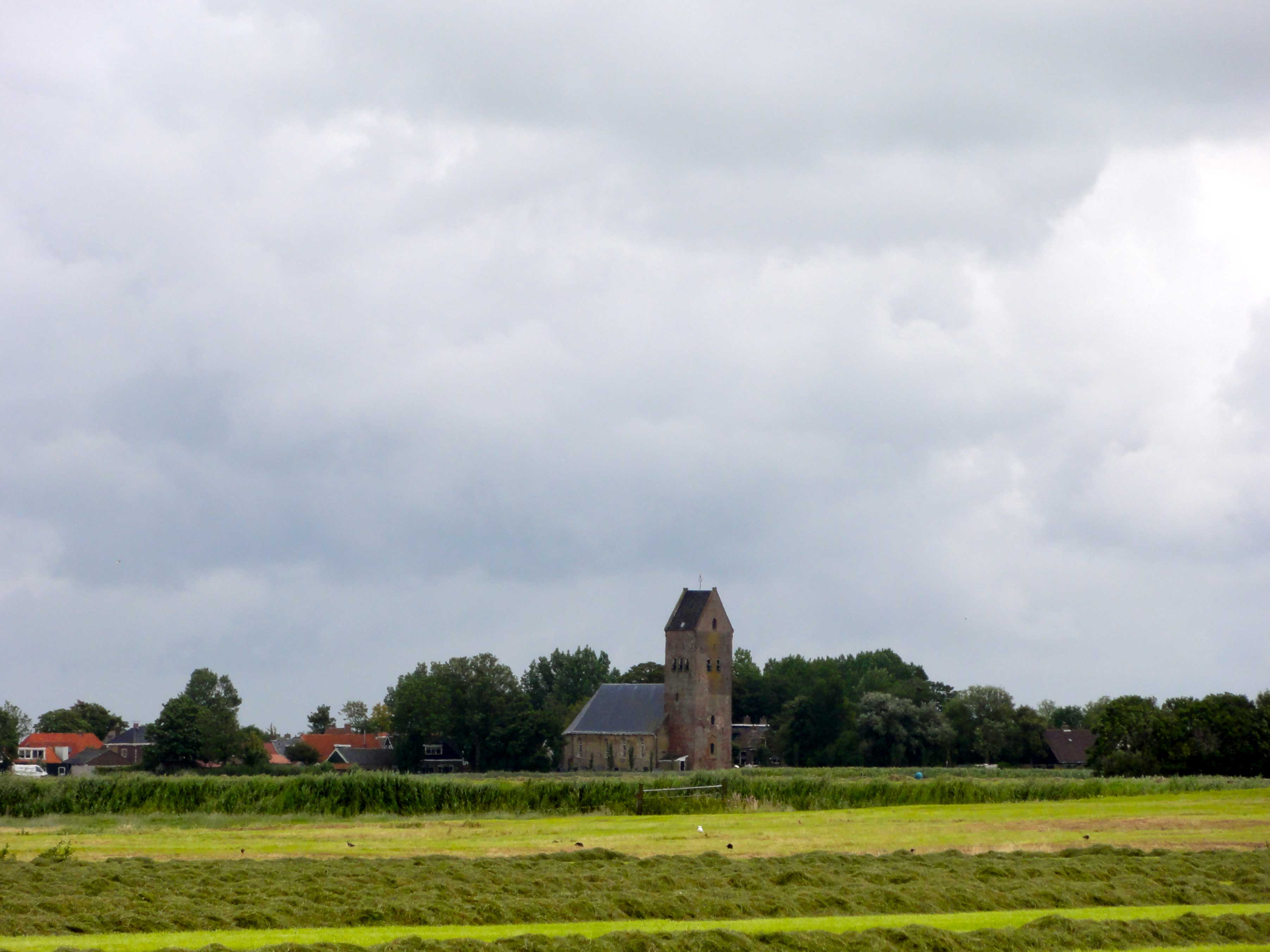
View of Parrega from the west

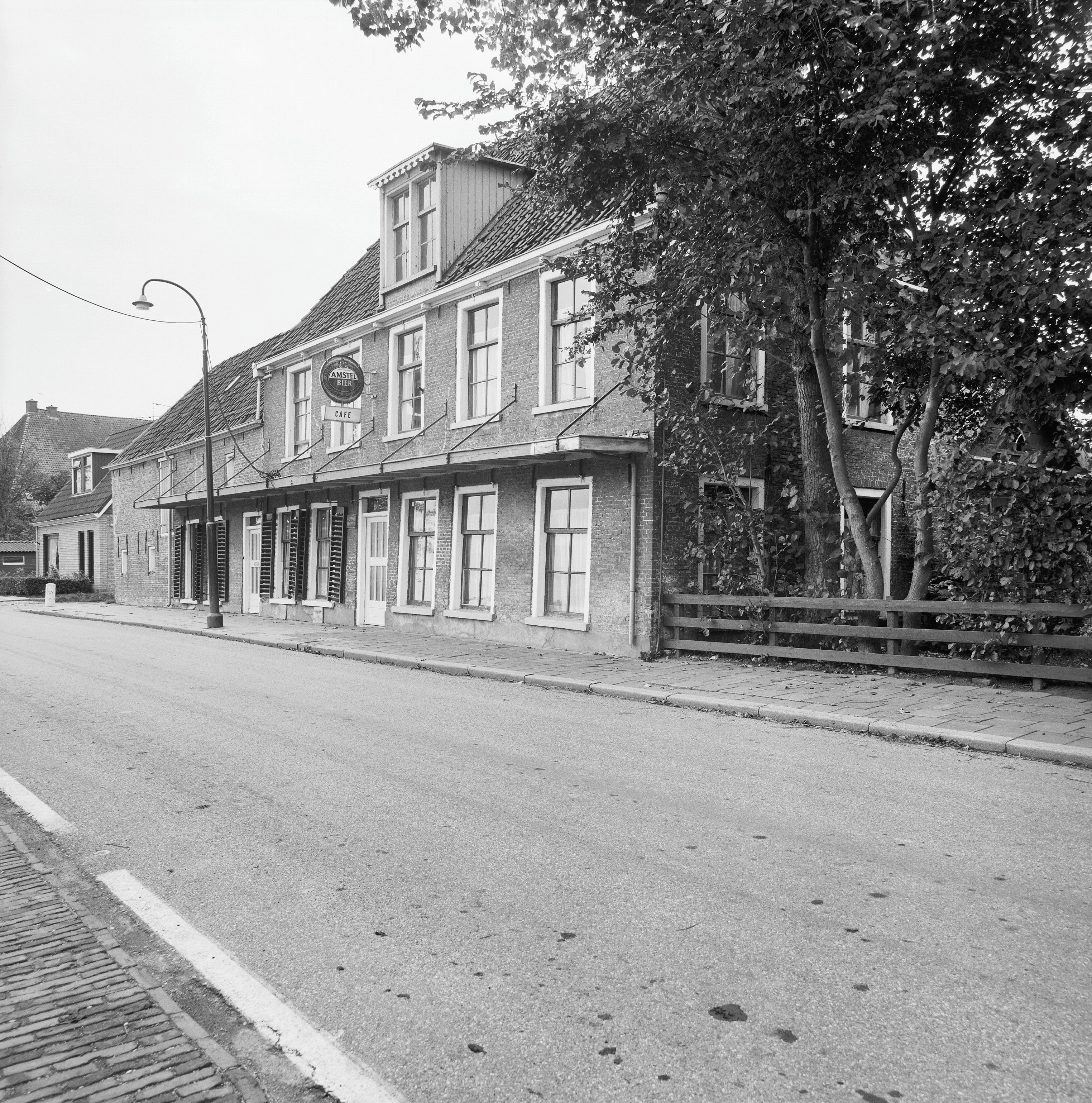
Pub in Parrega

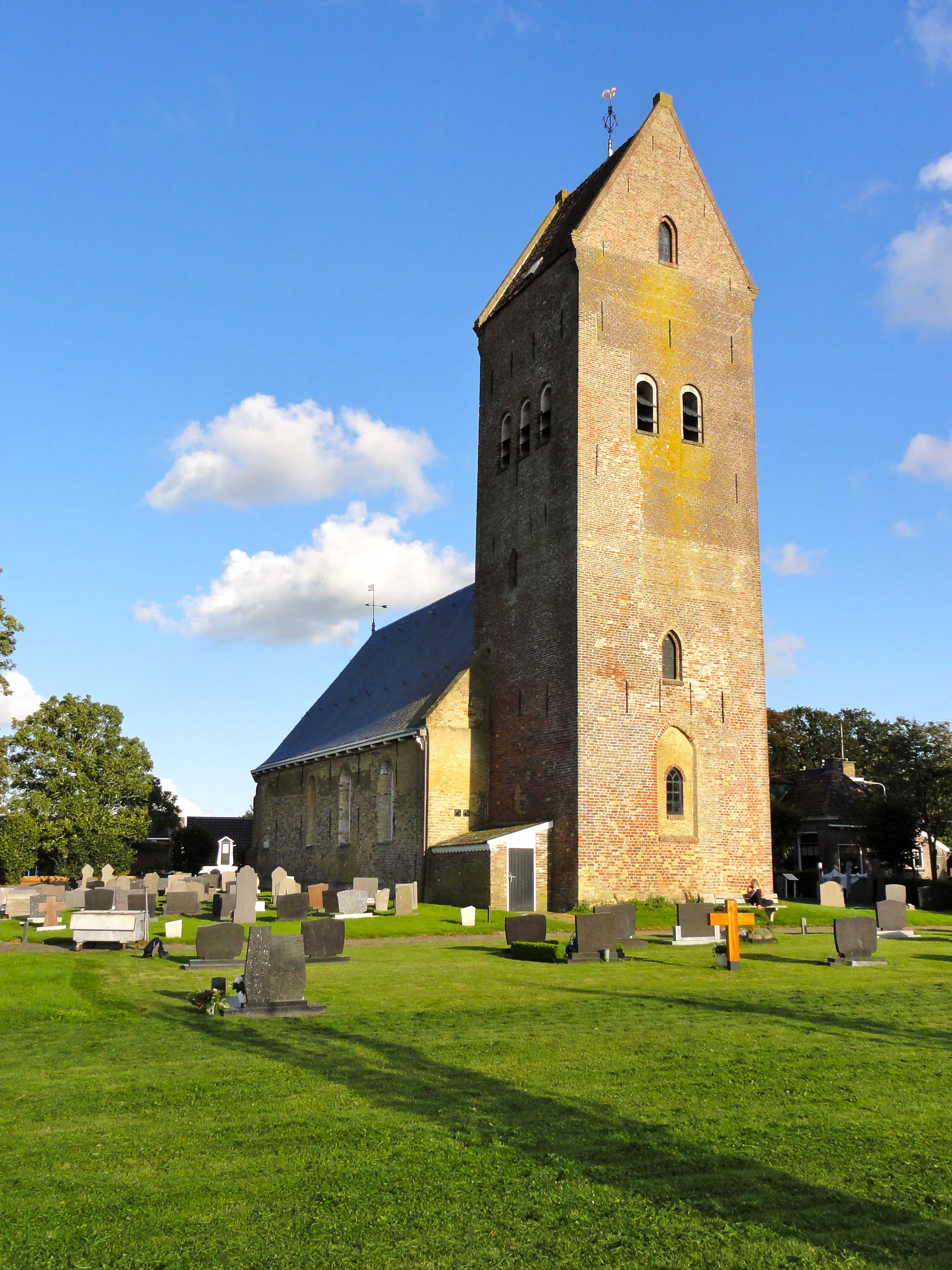
Church of Parrega
