= Gianmarco De Feo =

Italian football player

Personal information
- Date of birth: 2 June 1994 (age 32)
- Place of birth: Eboli, Italy
- Height: 1.70 m (5 ft 7 in)
- Position: Forward

Team information
- Current team: Paganese
- Number: 23

Youth career
- –2013: Milan
- 2011–2012: → Varese (loan)
- 2013–2014: Virtus Lanciano

Senior career*
Years	Team	Apps	(Gls)
2014–2016	Virtus Lanciano	0	(0)
2014–2015	→ Savona (loan)	18	(5)
2015	→ Grosseto (loan)	6	(1)
2015–2016	→ Siena (loan)	18	(3)
2016–2017	Siena	0	(0)
2016–2017	→ Lucchese (loan)	39	(9)
2017–2019	Ascoli	5	(0)
2018–2019	→ Lucchese (loan)	26	(7)
2020–2021	Vis Pesaro	25	(4)
2022–2023	Imolese	36	(4)
2023–2024	Brindisi	3	(0)
2024–	Paganese	6	(1)
- * Club domestic league appearances and goals as of 17 November 2024

Gianmarco De Feo (born 2 June 1994) is an Italian football player who plays for Serie D club Paganese.

== Club career ==
He made his Serie C debut for Savona on 6 September 2014 in a game against SPAL.

He was released from his contract with Ascoli by mutual consent on 18 December 2019.

On 31 December 2019, he signed a 2.5-year contract with Serie C club Vis Pesaro.

On 9 February 2022, De Feo signed with Imolese until the end of the season.

On 22 August 2023, De Feo joined Brindisi on a one-season contract.
