= David Woobay =

Sierra Leonean politician

David Woobay (born in Taimede Chiefdom, Moyamba, Moyamba District) is a Sierra Leonean politician and a member of the Sierra Leone People's Party (SLPP). He is a retired civil servant who served as the Director of Sports. He later on retirement became the first elected Moyamba District Council Chairman in 2004. He was re-elected to the same office in 2008 with 84% approval rating. David Woobay is a member of the Mende ethnic group. A foundation in his name was established to promote girl-child education in Moyamba District.
