= Septimus Kaikai =

Sierra Leonean politician

Septimus Kaikai (born in Kailahun, Kailahun District) is a retired Sierra Leonean politician and academic. He served as Presidential spokesman between 1997 and 2002, and as Minister of Information and Broadcasting from 2002 to 2007 in former president Ahmad Tejan Kabbah's second term in office. Kaikai is a member of the Mende ethnic group and a native of Kailahun District in Eastern Sierra Leone.

In 2010, Kaikai was appointed as the first chairman of the board of trustees for Sierra Leone Broadcasting Corporation (SLBC) by President Ernest Bai Koroma.

Kaikai studied at Towson University. He taught business at Catonsville Community College as a tenured Economics professor before returning suddenly to Sierra Leone in 1998.

He has a brother, Alpha Y. Kaikai, who is on the faculty of Catonsville Community College.
