= Civil Defence Forces =

Paramilitary organization in Sierra Leone

The Civil Defence Forces (CDF) (also the Civil Defence Force) was a paramilitary organization that fought in the Sierra Leone Civil War (1991–2002). It supported the elected government of Ahmed Tejan Kabbah against the rebel groups Revolutionary United Front (RUF) and Armed Forces Revolutionary Council (AFRC). Much of the CDF was made up of the Kamajors group, which is part of the larger Mende ethnic group. The Kamajors believed in many magical ways of defending themselves, such as rituals to create bulletproof skin.

Three leaders of the CDF were indicted at the Special Court for Sierra Leone, more specifically Samuel Hinga Norman (head of the CDF), Moinina Fofana (second in command) and Allieu Kondewa (military commander of the CDF).

== History ==
The term Civil Defence Forces was first coined in between 1997 and 1998 by expatriate Sierra Leoneans in Monrovia. The title encompassed "disparate militias previously referred to by ethnically coded titles". The CDF included soldiers from the militia groups the Kuranko tamaboro, the Mende kamajoisia, the Temne gbethis and kapras, and the Kono donsos. The goal of the overarching title was to create a sense of unity and prerogative between the independent militias.

The largest group involved with the CDF was the kamajoisia, or kamajors. Traditionally, the title kamajors is used to refer to the Mende belief in "specialized hunters empowered to use both firearms and occult 'medicines' in pursuit of big game" and against all other forces that threatened Mende villages. In Mende culture, the identity of the kamajors is synonymous with protection, and represented a similar meaning when community defense militias mobilized in reaction to the Sierra Leonean government's failure to defeat the rebel forces of the Revolutionary United Front (RUF).

The militia groups became increasingly consolidated as civilians came to distrust the military, which they saw as being as dangerous as the rebel groups. They soon fell under the influence and direction of academic Dr Alpha Lavalie and the National Provisional Ruling Council (NPRC) Secretary of State East, Lieutenant Tom Nyuma. The CDF increased its prominence and influence following the election of the Sierra Leone People's Party into office in 1996, which was largely composed of Mende members. Sam Hinga Norman, the Regent Chief of Jiama-Bongor chiefdom, became a key figure in the kamajor movement and was appointed as the SLPP's Deputy Minister of Defense. The CDF was widely viewed as the de facto security force for the SLPP, and would come into direct conflict with the military after the military's ousting of the SLPP government in May 1997. In coordination with the Nigerian-based Economic Community of West African States Monitoring Group (ECOMOG), the CDF was able to reinstate the SLPP to power in March 1998, and would be officially constituted until the civil war was officially declared over in January 2002.

== Atrocities ==
The CDF committed a vast number of atrocities and human rights abuses during the Sierra Leonean civil war. During the war, while fighting alongside the Nigerian ECOMOG troops, the CDF was either complicit or directly responsible for many of the events brought before the Special Court for Sierra Leone. In the offensive of January 1999 the CDF was accused of committing upwards of 180 executions of captured RUF members without validating their guilt. Furthermore, around the towns of Bradford and Moyamba, members of the Kamajors posed as rebels and launched multiple attacks on the civilian population that included robbery and indiscriminate murder. There have also been countless accounts of CDF abuses of children as well as the indoctrination and forced subordination of child soldiers.

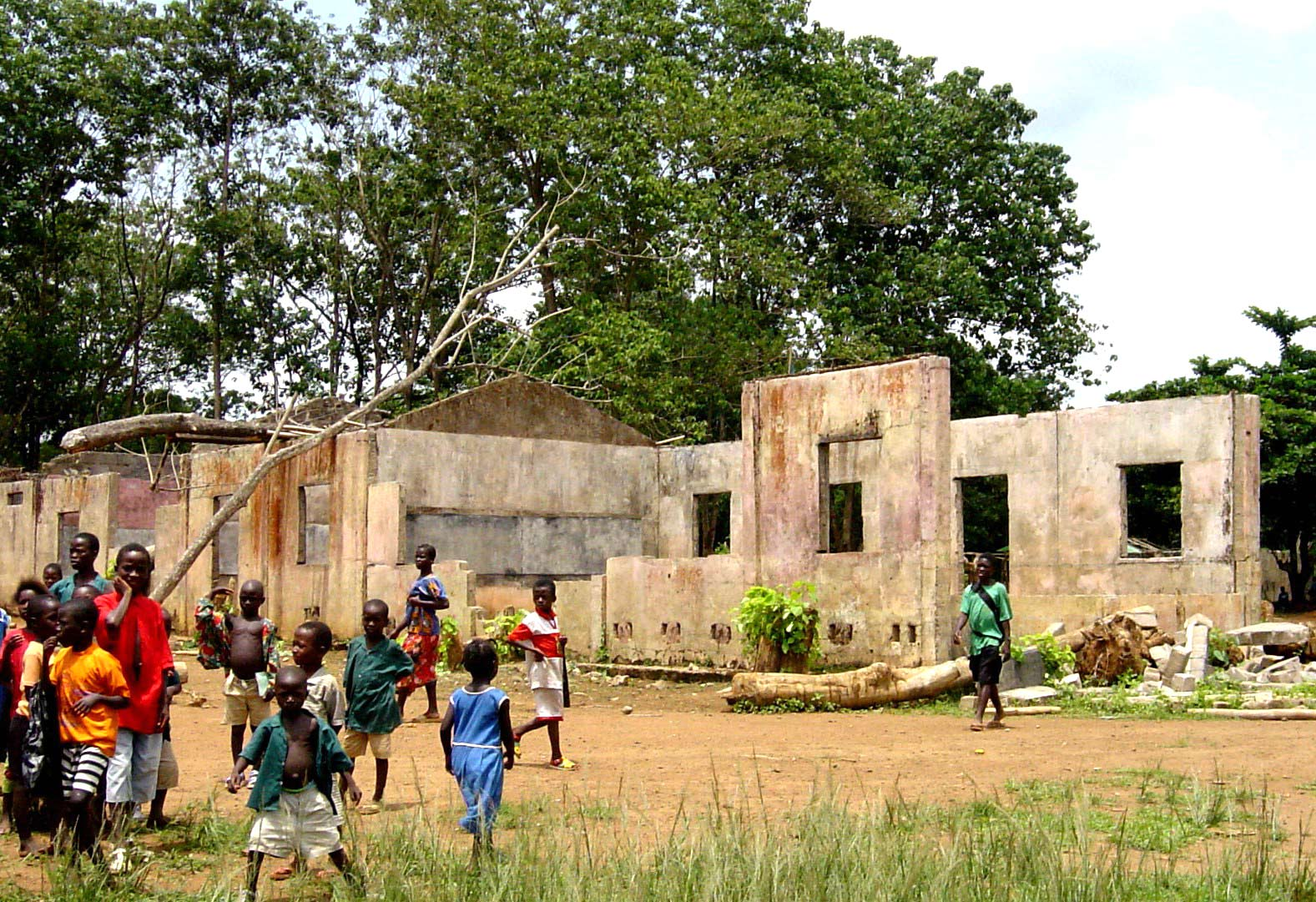
School destroyed by the Sierra Leone Civil War

== Indictments ==
In 2003 the Special Court for Sierra Leone was set up in cooperation with the United Nations to bring those responsible for the greatest crimes in the country's civil war to be prosecuted. Among the 13 convictions that were handed out were three prominent CDF members. The three men indicted were Allie Kondewa, Moinina Fofana and Samuel Hinga Norman. Each had been identified as a central leader of the CDF and most responsible for the crimes after a thorough investigation by the court, which took the testimonies of thousands of victims. The trial began in July 2004 and concluded in September 2006. Before sentences could be handed out Samuel Hinga Norman died of natural causes during surgery in Dakar, Senegal. Fofana and Kondewa were found guilty of the charges of murder, pillage and the use of child soldiers and were sentenced to six and eight years respectively. In 2008 the appeal court changed the sentencing and gave Fofna fifteen years and Kondewa twenty years to be served out in Rwandan prison.
