= Mende language =

Mande language of southern Sierra Leone

Mende
- Mɛnde yia 𞠗𞢱 𞡓𞠣
- Native to: Sierra Leone, Liberia, Guinea
- Region: South central Sierra Leone
- Ethnicity: Mende people
- Native speakers: 2.5 million (2020–2021)
- Language family: Niger–Congo?: Mande; Western; Southwestern; Mende–Loma; Mende–Bandi; Mende–Loko; Mende
- Dialects: Ko; Kpa; Sewawa; Wanjama
- Writing system: Latin; Mende Kikakui script

Language codes
- ISO 639-2: men
- ISO 639-3: men
- Glottolog: mend1266

Mende /ˈmɛndi/ (endonym: 𞠗𞢱 𞡓𞠣, Mɛnde yia) is a major language of Sierra Leone, with some speakers in neighboring Liberia and Guinea. It is spoken by the Mende people and by other ethnic groups as a regional lingua franca in southern Sierra Leone.

Mende is a tonal language belonging to the Mande language family. Early systematic descriptions of Mende were by F. W. Migeod and Kenneth Crosby. Ethel Aginsky decoded the language in her doctoral work.

== Phonology ==
=== Consonants ===
		Labial	Alveolar	Palatal	Velar	Labiovelar	Glottal
Plosive	plain	p	t		k	k͡p	
Plosive	voiced	b	d		ɡ	ɡ͡b	
Plosive	prenasalized	m͡b	n͡d		ŋ͡ɡ	ŋɡ͡b	
Fricative	plain	f	s				h
Fricative	voiced	v					
Affricate	voiced			d͡ʒ			
Affricate	prenasalized			ɲd͡ʒ			
Lateral			l				
Nasal		m	n	ɲ	ŋ		
Approximant		w		j			

=== Vowels ===
	Front	Central	Back
Close	i		u
Close-mid	e		o
Open-mid	ɛ		ɔ
Open		a	

Mende is commonly described as having 5 tones: high, low, rising, falling, rising-falling. These serve as relative tones within a downstep system, though some researchers propose it has extra tones with a multi-level system as opposed to a binary one.

== Written forms ==
Around 1917, Mohamed Turay invented a syllabary for Mende he called Kikakui (𞠀𞠁𞠂) which his son-in-law, nephew, and student, Kisimi Kamara, later expanded and popularized. The script achieved widespread use for a time, but was largely replaced with a Latin-based orthography later in the 20th century. The Mende script is considered a "failed script". The Bible was translated into Mende and published in 1959, in Latin script.

The Latin-based alphabet is: a, b, d, e, ɛ, f, g, gb, h, i, j, k, kp, l, m, n, ny, o, ɔ, p, s, t, u, v, w, y.

Mende has seven vowels: a, e, ɛ, i, o, ɔ, u.

== Media ==
=== Film ===
Mende was used extensively in the films Amistad and Blood Diamond and was the subject of the documentary film The Language You Cry In about the connections between the Gullah people of present-day Georgia and their ancestors from Sierra Leone, beginning with the work of Lorenzo Dow Turner who documented Gullah memories of the Mende language.

=== Oral literature ===
In 1908, F.W.H. Migeod, a British civil servant, published The Mende Language, which contains 17 stories in Mende with facing-text English translations, along with 13 Mende songs (lyrics only, no music).

Ralph Eberl-Elber, an Austrian ethnologist, published two Mende tales with English translations as he heard them in Sierra Leone in the 1935.

The American anthropologist Marion Dusser de Barenne Kilson worked with Mende storytellers in Sierra Leone as a graduate student in 1959 and 1960 (her husband, the political scientist Martin Kilson, was also conducting research in Sierra Leone at the time). Marion Kilson then returned to Sierra Leone in 1972 for further research and in 1976 she published Royal Antelope and Spider: West African Mende Tales, which contains 100 Mende folktales in both the original Mende and in English translation. The introduction provides an overview of Mende culture along with detailed information about Mende storytelling traditions.

For Mende proverbs in Mende and English translation, see "Some Mεnde Proverbs," an article published by M. Mary Senior in 1947.

== Sample text ==
Numuvuisia Kpɛlɛɛ ta ti le tɛ yɛ nduwɔ ya hu, tao ti nuvuu yei kɛɛ ti lɔnyi maa hɛwungɔ. Kiiya kɛɛ hindaluahu gɔɔla a yɛlɔ ti hun. Fale mahoungɔ ti ti nyɔnyɔhu hoi kia ndeegaa.

=== Translation ===
All human beings are born free and equal in dignity and rights. They are endowed with reason and conscience and should act towards one another in a spirit of brotherhood.

(Article 1 of the Universal Declaration of Human Rights)
