= Brindisi FC =

Italian football club

Brindisi
- Full name: Brindisi Football Club
- Nicknames: Adriatici (The Adtriatics); Biancazzurri (The White and Blues); Messapici (The Messapians)
- Founded: 1912; 114 years ago as, F.B. Brindisi 1912; 1928; 98 years ago as, Polisportiva Brindisi Sport; 1972; 54 years ago as, Brindisi Sport; 1990; 36 years ago as, Brindisi Calcio (refounded); 2004; 22 years ago as, Football Brindisi 1912 (refounded); 2011; 15 years ago as, S.S.D. Calcio Città di Brindisi (refounded); 2015; 11 years ago as Brindisi Football Club (refounded)
- Ground: Stadio Franco Fanuzzi, Brindisi, Italy
- Capacity: 7,622
- Chairman: Giuseppe Roma
- Manager: Alessandro Monticciolo
- League: Eccellenza Apulia
- 2024–25: Serie D Group H, 16th of 18 (relegated)
- Website: https://www.brindisifc.it/
Home colours	Away colours

Brindisi Football Club is an Italian association football club located in Brindisi, in the region of Apulia in southern Italy.

== History ==
Brindisi was founded in 1912 as F.B. Brindisi 1912 and refounded in 1990 and then refounded in 2004 and then refounded in 2011 and then refounded in 2015 with the current name.

=== Brindisi Calcio ===
The team played in Serie C2 in the 2003–04 season. At the end of the year, the team went bankrupt and the new club was placed in Eccellenza.

=== F.B. Brindisi 1912 ===
In the 2004–05 season of Eccellenza Apulia, Brindisi placed second, qualifying for the national playoffs. The team won its two rounds in the playoffs, thus winning promotion to Serie D.

For the next 4 season, the team played in Serie D. In the 2008–09 season, Brindisi clinched first place in Girone H, thus gaining direct promotion to Lega Pro Seconda Divisione.

In summer 2011, it did not appeal against the exclusion of Covisoc.

=== S.S.D. Città di Brindisi ===
The club is restarted in Serie D with the new denomination of Società Sportiva Dilettantistica Città di Brindisi. It went bankrupt in only four years.

=== New Brindisi ===
Real Paradiso Brindisi in Prima Categoria created the new Brindisi in 2015. Following the club promotion in Serie C at the end of the 2022/2023 season, they reached professional football again and dropped the "SSD" ("Società Sportiva Dilettantistica", which means "Amateur Sports Club" in italian) in their name, being for the first time in 33 years a fully professional football club again.

== Current squad ==
As of 18 July 2024

Note: Flags indicate national team as defined under FIFA eligibility rules; some limited exceptions apply. Players may hold more than one non-FIFA nationality.

No.	Pos.	Nation	Player
1	GK	ITA	Vittorio Antonino
3	DF	ITA	Niccolò Monti
4	DF	ARG	Franco Gorzelewski
5	DF	ITA	Gianluca Florentino
6	MF	SLE	Winston Ceesay
7	FW	ITA	Daniele Vantaggiato
10	MF	ITA	Davide Petrucci
12	GK	ITA	Cristiano Auro
15	DF	ITA	Niccolò Bellucci
16	DF	ARG	Bruno Valenti
19	FW	ITA	Angelo Guida
26	DF	ITA	Tommaso Merletti
27	DF	ITA	Marco Calderoni

No.	Pos.	Nation	Player
29	FW	ITA	Marcello Trotta
30	FW	ITA	Gianmarco De Feo
34	DF	ITA	Davide Galazzini
36	MF	ITA	Carlo Martorelli
77	FW	ITA	Patrizio Zerbo
—	MF	ITA	Matteo Montinaro
—	FW	COD	Benjamin Mokulu
—	DF	ITA	Leonardo Nunzella
—	DF	SEN	Dembe Sall
—	MF	ITA	Ciro Lucchese
—	FW	ITA	Saverio Bellino
—	DF	ITA	Bruno De pace

== Colors and badge ==
Its colors are white and blue.

== Honours ==
- Coppa Italia Serie C
  - Winners (1): 2002–03
