= Sjoerd Hofstra =

Dutch sociologist and anthropologist

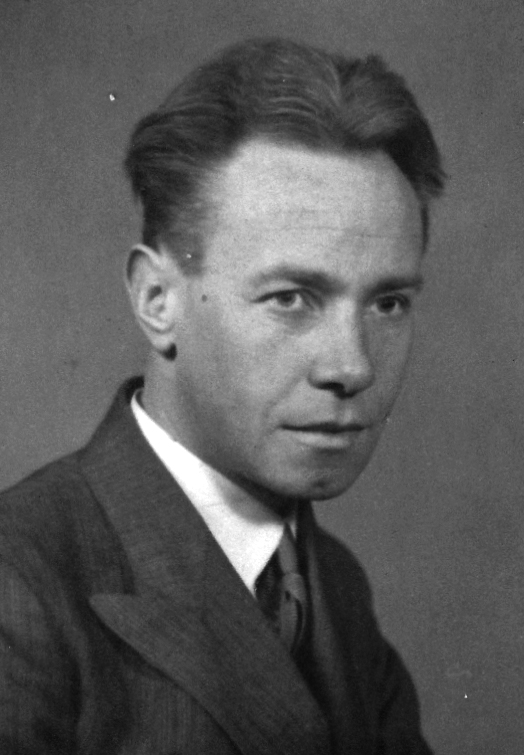
- Hofstra (1932)
- Born: Sjoerd Hofstra; 21 January 1897; Idsegahuizum
- Died: 14 April 1983 (aged 86); Thun
- Education: Ph.D., University of Amsterdam (1933)
- Occupation: Anthropologist

Sjoerd Hofstra (Idsegahuizum, 21 January 1898 – Thun, 14 April 1983) was a Dutch sociologist and anthropologist, best known as the first Dutch person to conduct ethnographic fieldwork in Africa, where he lived among the Mende in Sierra Leone. Hofstra was also an advocate for animal welfare.

== Early life and journalism ==
Hofstra was born in Friesland in 1898, the second youngest of three siblings, to parents Pier Hofstra – a carpenter – and Janneke Visser. Prior to his academic career, Hofstra initially forayed into journalism, working for two Dutch local newspapers; the Hepkema's Courant/Nieuwsblad van Friesland (Dutch) and Nieuwsblad van het Noorden.

== Study and work ==
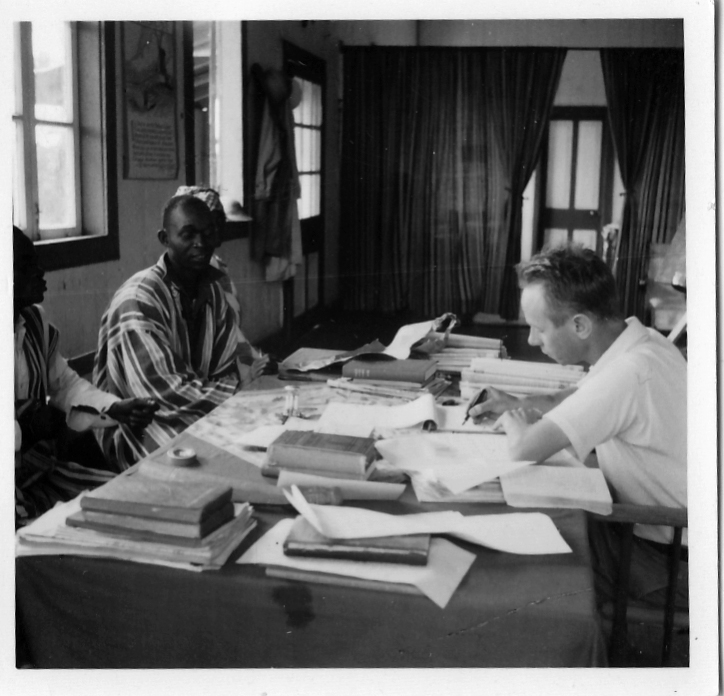
Hofstra at work in Panguma 1936. Pictured across from him is his informant Thomas C. Conteh.

With the assistance of a benefactor, Hofstra studied psychology and sociology in Paris in 1924, moving to the University of Amsterdam from 1925 where he switched to social geography. He then continued his studies in Hamburg, Berlin and London, the latter saw him acquainted with Bronislaw Malinowski. He completed his doctorate at the University of Amsterdam under the tutelage of Sebald Steinmetz.

Hofstra became the first Dutch sociologist to conduct fieldwork in Africa when he traveled to Sierra Leone. In two visits from 1934 to 1936 he conducted ethnographic field work among the Mende people. After contracting blackwater fever, he was advised by medical professionals to cease his research. Despite preparations being undertaken to resume his research in Sierra Leone after the Second World War, these never materialised.

Between 1938 and 1949 Hofstra held the position of director of the Wereldmuseum in Rotterdam (then known as the Museum voor Land en Volkenkunde). Alongside his duties in this position he served as professor by special appointment of African ethnology at the University of Leiden. Other positions included a fellowship at the University of Amsterdam. In 1950 he became a member of the Royal Netherlands Academy of Arts and Sciences.

Hofstra was one of the founding figures of the Institute of Social Studies in The Hague in 1952, serving as its first director for two years.

== Animal welfare ==
Hofstra was a vegetarian from childhood. Alongside his academic research, he dedicated his life to animal protection. In 1953 he was elected chief board member of the Dutch Society for the Protection of Animals, rising to chairman in 1961. He held this position until 1973.

== Later life and death ==
Retiring from academia in 1968, Hofstra spent the final years of his life drawing attention to issues with factory farming. He served on the Study Committee for Intensive Livestock Farming, a group established by the Dutch Society for the Protection of Animals until his death. Hofstra died 14 April 1983 in Thun, Switzerland.

== Archive ==
Hofstra's scientific legacy (fieldwork notes and other notes) is kept between the African Studies Centre Leiden in Leiden and the Special Collections of the University of Amsterdam. His time in Sierra Leone is documented through his correspondence collected in the volume Among the Mende in Sierra Leone: the letters from Sjoerd Hofstra (1934-36), assembled by his daughter and professor of social and cultural history at the University of Amsterdam, Marijke Gijswijt-Hofstra.

== Publications ==
His publications include:

- (pseudonym Johannes Hoving): Droom en daad. Enkele proza-zangen (poetry in Dutch, Dream and deed. Some prose songs). Amersfoort, S.D. Veen, 1919
- Differenzierungserscheinungen in einigen afrikanischen Gruppen. Ein Beitrag zur Frage der primitiven Individualität (in German, Differentiation phenomena in some African groups. A contribution to the question of primitive individuality). Dissertation GU Amsterdam, 1933.
- The Social Aspects of Knowledge and Science. Amsterdam, Scheltema & Holkema, 1937
- The Belief Among the Mendi in Non-Ancestral Spirits, and Its Relation to a Case of Parricide. Internationales Archiv für Ethnographie 40 (5–6): 175–183, 1942
- De houding van den mensch tegenover de natuur (in Dutch, Man's attitude to nature). Arnhem, Van Loghum Slaterus, 1945.
- African Ethnology. Problems, Place and Meaning. Leiden, Brill, 1947
- Over universiteit, Marcuse en rationaliteit (in Dutch, On University, Marcuse and Rationality). Farewell speech GU Amsterdam. Leiden, Brill, 1969
- Enkele culturele en sociale Aspecten van een damverbinding met Ameland (in Dutch, Some Cultural and Social Aspects of a Dam Connection with Ameland). Mededelingen der Akademie van Wetenschappen, afd. Letterkunde. Nieuwe Reeks, XXXIII, nr. 3 (Amsterdam [etc.] 1970). Amsterdam Noord-Hollandse Uitg. Mij., 1970
