= Kenneth Crosby =

British Wesleyan missionary, bible translator and language scholar (1904–1998)

Kenneth Crosby (1904–1998) was a British Wesleyan missionary, a Bible translator and language scholar, who worked in Sierra Leone. He is best known for his work in the Mende language.

Crosby was born on 12 May 1904 at Briton Ferry, near Neath in South Wales to Rev Harry Crosby and his wife; after leaving high school he became a Wesleyan Methodist preacher. He studied at the University of London and graduated with a BD degree in 1927, then a BA in philosophy from the same university. He left for Sierra Leone in 1929, though returned to Britain temporarily in 31, where he was ordained and also married to his fiancee Dorothy.

In Sierra Leone, his service included being a part of a team that translating the Bible into Mende, helping to found the Bunumbu Press, and serving as the first principal of Bunumbu Union College (now Bunumbu Teachers College).

In 1939, he was awarded a PhD degree from the University of London for his dissertation A study of the Mende Language. He wrote of the Mende language, "I was brought up on the classics and had been taught that classical Greek was the most perfect instrument of speech ever devised. I accepted this, of course, unthinkingly and believed it implicitly until I met the Mende language. But then I began to think differently. I marvelled at its incredible beauty, its wonderful cadences, its skillful nuances and the deeper I went the more I learned to wonder" (Tuchscherer 1998:220).

Crosby also investigated and wrote on the system of polygamy among rural Mendeans.

Crosby retired in 1971 and moved to Craneigh in Surrey; he died on 23rd March 1998.

== Family ==
Crosby was married to Dorothy and they had a daughter, Ann and a son, John.

== Publications ==
- 1944. An Introduction to the Study of Mende. Cambridge University Press.
