= Kamajors =

Mende ethnic group traditional hunters in Sierra Leone

The Kamajors were a group of traditional hunters from the Mende ethnic group in the south and east of Sierra Leone (mostly from the Bo district). The word "Kamajor" derived from Mende "kama soh", meaning traditional hunter with mystical powers, who were originally employed by local chiefs.

Under the leadership of Samuel Hinga Norman, the Kamajors were used by President Ahmed Tejan Kabbah in 1996 to replace mercenaries (Executive Outcomes) as the security force of the government. This security force was called Civil Defence Forces (CDF). At that time, the force was expanded to over 20,000 men, dwarfing the army and mercenaries. Kabbah's presidency ended when a coup led by junior officers in 1997 installed Johnny Paul Koroma as the head of state.

The Kamajors were a part of the ECOMOG (a Nigerian-led force) counteroffensive to reinstate Kabbah in 1998. In 1999, Freetown was taken by the Charles Taylor backed by Foday Sankoh led Armed Forces Revolutionary Council (AFRC), which was a combination of the rebel Revolutionary United Front (RUF) and the former Sierra Leone Army (SLA). The Kamajors again served with ECOMOG and UN peacekeepers in trying to secure stability.

Because of the alleged violations of international law, the leaders of the CDF (including Hinga Norman) were indicted before the Special Court for Sierra Leone.

== Legacy ==
Although some point to diamond fields (blood diamonds) as the real motivating factor of the Kamajors, they played a major role in the march toward Sierra Leonean stability. On the other hand, the Kamajors have been accused of pillaging, terrorizing, and killing civilians in Sierra Leone, as well as employing soldiers under the age of 15. In March 2003, Hinga Norman was indicted for these war crimes by the Special Court for Sierra Leone. His trial began in June 2004 along with that of two of his lieutenants, Moinina Fofana and Allieu Kondewa.
