= Idsegahuizum =

Idsegahuizum Skuzum
- Village
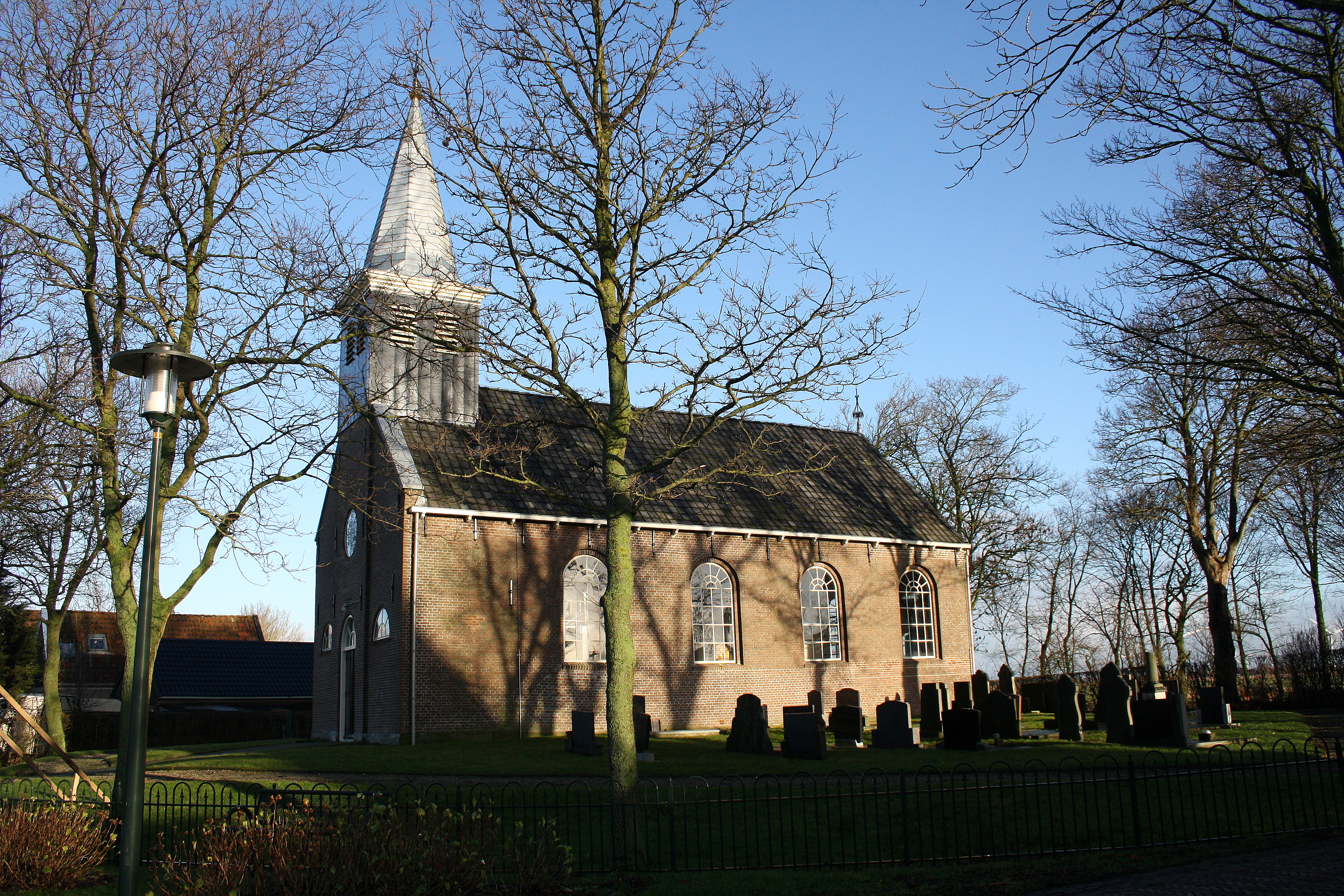
- Idsegahuizum Church

- Flag Coat of arms

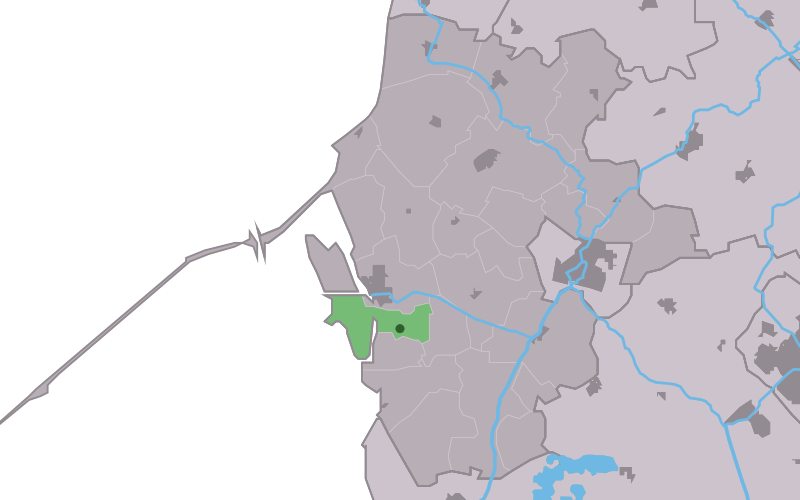
- Location in the former Wûnseradiel municipality

- Location in the Netherlands Idsegahuizum (Netherlands)
- Country: Netherlands
- Province: Friesland
- Municipality: Súdwest-Fryslân

Area
  - Total: 7.47 km^{2} (2.88 sq mi)
- Elevation: 0.5 m (1.6 ft)

Population (2021)
  - Total: 225
  - Density: 30.1/km^{2} (78.0/sq mi)
- Time zone: UTC+1 (CET)
  - Summer (DST): UTC+2 (CEST)
- Postal code: 8754
- Dialing code: 0515

Idsegahuizum (West Frisian: Skuzum) is a village in Southwest-Friesland in the province of Friesland, the Netherlands. It had a population of around 220 in January 2017.

== History ==
The village was first mentioned in the 13th century as Ytzinghahusum, and means "settlement of the people of Idse (person)". Idsegahuizum is a terp (artificial living hill) village which is located near the former Zuiderzee (nowadays: IJsselmeer). It is an agricultural community which specialises in potatoes and gladioli. The village could only be reached via the sea dike. Between 1876 and 1879, the Makkumermeer was poldered and road was built to Allingawier and the world beyond.

The Dutch Reformed church was built in 1870 as a replacement of a medieval church. In 1874, a nearly identical church was built in Hieslum.

Idsegahuizum was home to 77 people in 1840. Before 2011, the village was part of the Wûnseradiel municipality.

== Notable people ==
- Sjoerd Hofstra (1898–1983), sociologist and anthropologist

== Gallery ==
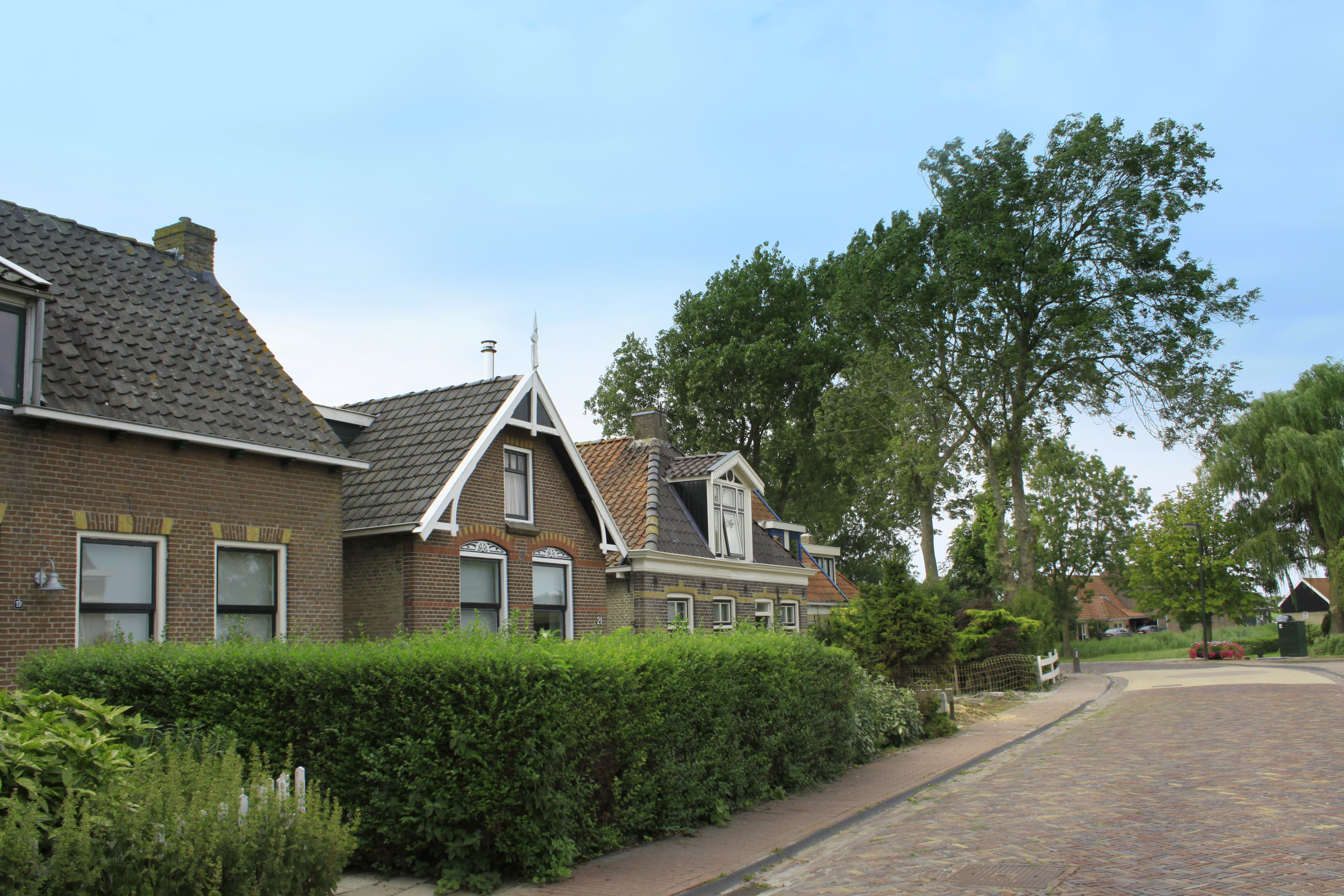
Street in Idsegahuizum

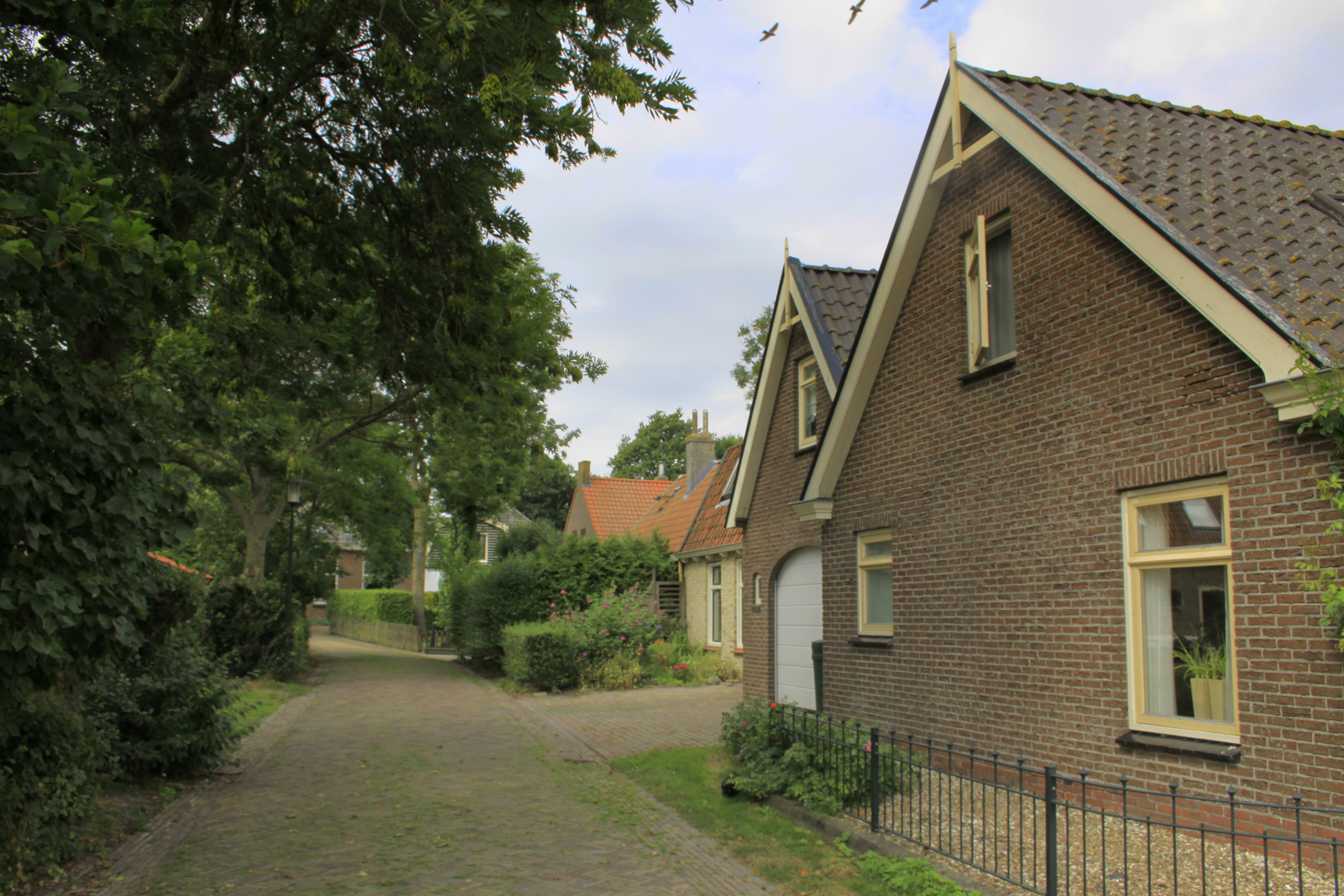
Street in Idsegahuizum

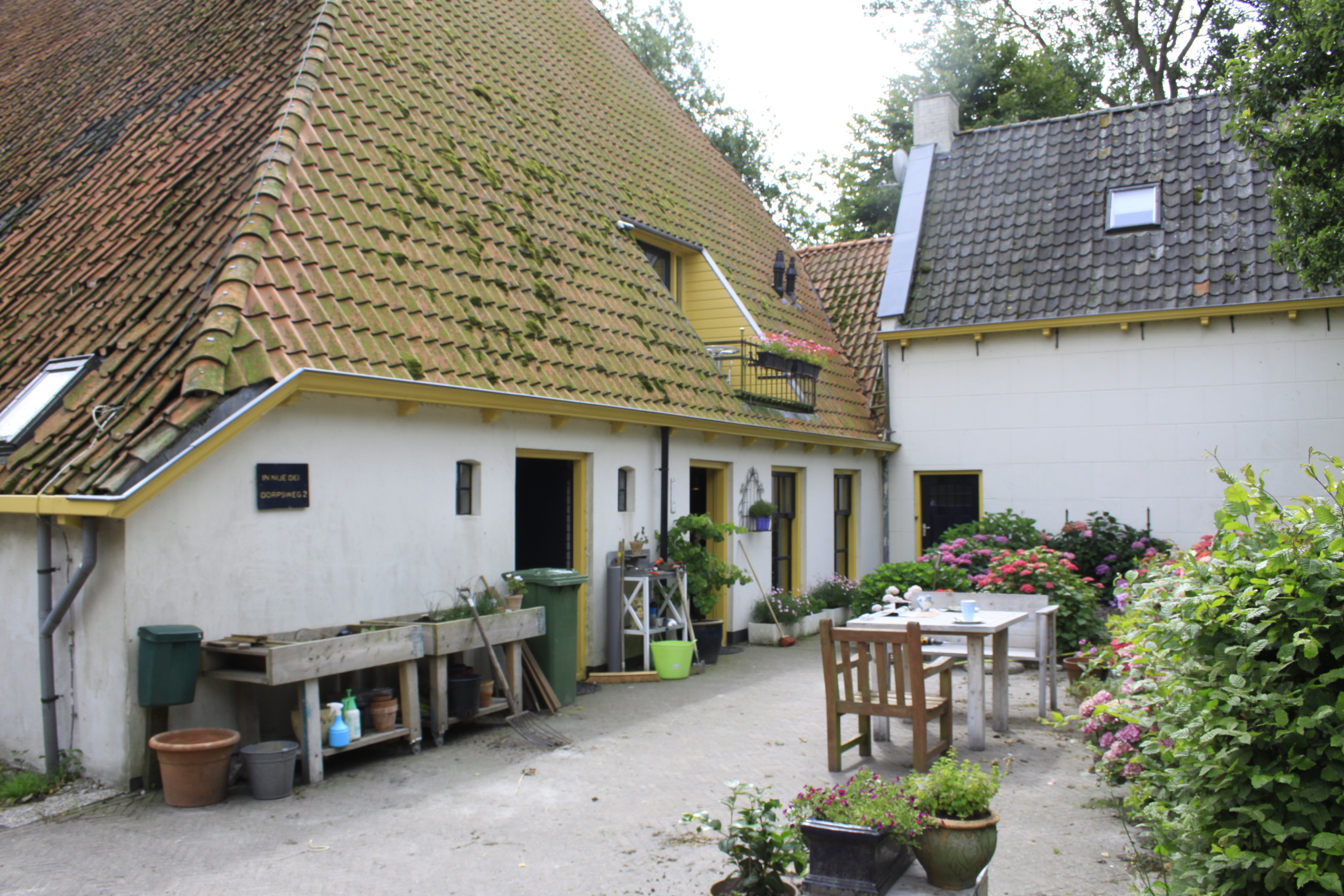
Former farm
