= Franco Gorzelewski =

Argentine footballer

Personal information
- Date of birth: 6 June 1996 (age 30)
- Place of birth: Buenos Aires, Argentina
- Height: 1.84 m (6 ft 0 in)
- Position: Centre-back

Team information
- Current team: Trapani
- Number: 4

Youth career
- Huracán
- 2015: → Padova (loan)

Senior career*
Years	Team	Apps	(Gls)
2016–2017	Huracán	0	(0)
2016	→ Alcobendas Sport (loan)	12	(0)
2017	Paganese	1	(0)
2018	Palazzolo	6	(0)
2018	Santamarina	4	(0)
2019–2020	US Levico Terme	19	(0)
2020–2021	Lanusei	4	(0)
2021	Insieme Formia	24	(1)
2021–2022	Fasano	30	(2)
2022–2024	Brindisi	48	(2)
2024–2025	Gelbison	18	(1)
2025–2026	Virtus Francavilla	20	(0)
2026–	Trapani	0	(0)
- * Club domestic league appearances and goals as of 28 September 2026

Franco Gorzelewski (born 6 June 1996) is an Argentine professional footballer who plays as a centre-back for Italian Serie D club Trapani.

== Career ==
Gorzelewski started his career with Huracán. While featuring for their academy teams, the defender spent time out on loan in Italy with Lega Pro's Padova; though didn't appear competitively for the club. In 2016, Gorzelewski joined Tercera División side Alcobendas Sport. Twelve appearances followed in the fourth tier of Spanish football. January 2017 saw Gorzelewski depart Huracán permanently, subsequently signing for Paganese of the Italian Lega Pro. He was an unused sub twelve times in 2016–17, before making his debut in their season finale against Reggina on 7 May. A stint with Palazzolo came in 2018.

In July 2018, Gorzelewski returned to Argentina after agreeing a move to Primera B Nacional's Santamarina. His professional bow arrived on 1 September during a 0–0 draw at home to Arsenal de Sarandí. In September 2019, Gorzelewski moved to Italy again and joined Serie D club US Levico Terme. He made nineteen appearances as they suffered relegation; a fate he had previously experienced with Palazzolo. Gorzelewski, however, remained in Serie D after penning terms with Lanusei Calcio.

In January 2021, Gorzelewski moved to Insieme Formia. On 2 August 2021, he joined Fasano.

== Personal life ==
Gorzelewski was born in Buenos Aires, Argentina to a Polish father and an Italian mother, who was born in Calabria, Italy.

== Career statistics ==
As of 16 December 2020.

Club statistics
Club	Season	League			Cup		League Cup		Continental		Other		Total	
Club	Season	Division	Apps	Goals	Apps	Goals	Apps	Goals	Apps	Goals	Apps	Goals	Apps	Goals
Huracán	2016	Primera División	0	0	0	0	—		0	0	0	0	0	0
Huracán	2016–17	Primera División	0	0	0	0	—		0	0	0	0	0	0
Huracán	Total		0	0	0	0	—		0	0	0	0	0	0
Alcobendas Sport (loan)	2015–16	Tercera División	12	0	0	0	—		—		0	0	12	0
Paganese	2016–17	Lega Pro	1	0	0	0	0	0	—		0	0	1	0
Palazzolo	2017–18	Serie D	6	0	0	0	0	0	—		0	0	6	0
Santamarina	2018–19	Primera B Nacional	4	0	0	0	—		—		0	0	4	0
US Levico Terme	2019–20	Serie D	19	0	0	0	0	0	—		0	0	19	0
Lanusei Calcio	2020–21	Serie D	3	0	0	0	0	0	—		0	0	3	0
Career total			45	0	0	0	0	0	0	0	0	0	45	0
