= Tommaso Merletti =

Italian footballer

Personal information
- Date of birth: 10 September 2001 (age 25)
- Place of birth: Milan, Italy
- Height: 1.84 m (6 ft 0 in)
- Position: Centre back

Team information
- Current team: Brindisi
- Number: 26

Youth career
- –2020: AC Milan

Senior career*
Years	Team	Apps	(Gls)
2020–2022	Renate	27	(0)
2022–2024	Lucchese	26	(0)
2024–	Brindisi	11	(0)
- * Club domestic league appearances and goals as of 6 May 2024

Tommaso Merletti (born 10 September 2001) is an Italian professional footballer who plays as a centre back for Eccellenza Apulia club Brindisi.

== Club career ==
Formed on Milan youth system, Merletti joined to Serie C club Renate on 24 August 2020.
