= Samuel Hinga Norman =

Sierra Leonean politician

Samuel Hinga Norman (January 1, 1940 – February 22, 2007) was a Sierra Leonean politician from the Mende tribe. He was the founder and leader of the Civil Defence Forces, commonly known as the Kamajors. The Kamajors supported the government of Ahmed Tejan Kabbah against the Revolutionary United Front (RUF), which was led by Foday Sankoh. On 7 March 2003 Hinga Norman was indicted by the Special Court for Sierra Leone for war crimes and crimes against humanity. He died on 22 February 2007 in Dakar, Senegal while undergoing medical treatment.

== Youth ==
Sam Hinga Norman was born January 1, 1940, in Mongeri, Bo District, in the Southern Province of Sierra Leone. He joined the Sierra Leone Army in 1959 and served until 1972, ascending to the rank of captain. He also attended school during this time and received a diploma from the Officer's School of Aldershot in the United Kingdom. Before his death, which entails controversies within, he was survived by an elder brother Michael H. Norman who was a distinguished Educationists in Ghana and notable among Michael Norman children is Fred Michael who is presently a director with the Global Resources Inc. Accra Ghana.

== Political service to Sierra Leone ==
Entering politics, Hinga Norman became Deputy Minister of Defence, serving from April 20, 1998, to May 21, 2002). He then served as Minister of the Interior from May 21, 2002, to March 10, 2004, overlapping his indictment at the Special Court. He also served as the national director of the CDF, and tapped the traditional groups called the Kamajors to serve as a militia.

== Kamajors ==
The Kamajors are a group of traditional hunters from the south and east of the country. They were originally employed by local chiefs, but under the leadership of Hinga Norman were used by President Ahmed Tejan Kabbah in 1996 to replace mercenaries (Executive Outcomes and Sandline International, both of whom helped train the force) as the security force of the government. At that time members of the Sierra Leone Army (SLA), calling themselves the Armed Forces Revolutionary Council (AFRC), were supporting Revolutionary United Front (RUF) leader Foday Sankoh against the Kabbah government. The Kamajors integrated themselves into the ECOMOG (a Nigeria led force) counteroffensive to reinstate Kabbah in 1998 after Freetown was taken by the RUF (backed by Charles Taylor and led by Foday Sankoh) in combination with the Armed Forces Revolutionary Council, led by Johnny Paul Koroma. The force eventually consisted of over 20,000 men, dwarfing the size of the army and the rebel groups.

=== Problems of the Kamajors ===
The Kamajors were not a professionally trained army. They were also made up by soldiers whose allegiances were not always clear. Many fighters in the civil war fought on different sides at different times. This led to the coinage of the term sobel or soldier by day, rebel by night, especially in connection with the SLA. The Kamajors too have been accused of pillaging, terrorizing, and killing. Less ambiguous is the accusation of recruiting soldiers under the age of 15, in clear violation of the Geneva Conventions.

== Trial at the Special Court for Sierra Leone ==
Sam Hinga Norman was indicted on March 7, 2003, by the Special Court for Sierra Leone (TSSL). He was arrested on March 10 and plead not guilty on the 15 of the same month. His indictment accused him of

- crimes against humanity for: inhuman murders and acts;
- violations of Article 3 of the Geneva Conventions as well as Additional Protocol II for: acts of terrorism and collective punishment against the civilian population, reached with the physical and mental integrity and the life in particular cruel treatment, plundering;
- other serious violations of the international humanitarian law due to enrolment of children of less than 15 years in the armed forces

Norman's trial then began on June 3, 2004, along with those of Moinina Fofana and Allieu Kondewa. At the outset of his trial, Norman dissolved his legal team and stated that he wished to represent himself. He later assented to standby counsel representing him. His trial concluded with closing arguments in September 2006. Norman died in custody on February 22, 2007, before verdict after having undergone a surgical procedure in Dakar, Senegal. The trial proceedings against him were accordingly terminated.
