= Allieu Kondewa =

Sierra Leonean military commander

Allieu Kondewa is a former traditional doctor in the Kamajors tribe and military commander of the Civil Defence Forces in Sierra Leone. He was born in the Bo District and lived served until his arrest and subsequent trial by the Special Court for Sierra Leone.

== Trial and conviction ==
Kondewa's trial began on 3 June 2004 and was tried alongside his fellow ranking members of the CDF, Moinina Fofana and Samuel Hinga Norman.

On 2 August 2007 Kondewa and Fofana were convicted of the war crimes of murder, violence to life and mental suffering, pillage, and collective punishments. Kondewa was further found guilty of the war crime of the use of child soldiers. Kondewa was acquitted of related charges of crimes against humanity and the war crime of terrorism. On 9 October 2007, the Court sentenced Kondewa to eight years imprisonment. Kondewa has appealed his conviction to the Court's Appeals Chamber.
