= Winston Ceesay =

Sierra Leonean football player (born 2000)

Personal information
- Full name: Winston Razel Ceesay
- Date of birth: 10 August 2000 (age 26)
- Place of birth: Freetown, Sierra Leone
- Height: 1.85 m (6 ft 1 in)
- Position: Midfielder

Team information
- Current team: Termoli
- Number: 6

Senior career*
Years	Team	Apps	(Gls)
2018–2019	Troina	23	(1)
2019–2020	Licata	17	(0)
2020	Siena	0	(0)
2020–2021	Lucchese	7	(0)
2021–2022	Rotonda	42	(2)
2022	Trapani	2	(0)
2022–2024	Brindisi	31	(1)
2024–2025	Virtus Francavilla	23	(0)
2025–	Termoli	25	(1)

International career
2022	Sierra Leone	1	(0)
- * Club domestic league appearances and goals as of 12 April 2026

Winston Razel Ceesay (born 10 August 2000) is a Sierra Leonean professional footballer who plays as a midfielder for Serie D club Termoli.

== Club career ==
Ceesay started his senior team career with Italian Serie D club Troina in the 2018–19 season. He joined Licata following season, where he found regular playing time. In January 2020, Serie C club Siena signed Ceesay on a permanent deal. However, the league got halted within next few weeks due to COVID-19 pandemic in Italy and he left the club without making any appearance for them.

On 12 November 2020, Lucchese announced the signing of Ceesay on a short term deal until the end of the season. He made his Serie C and professional debut on 15 November 2020 in a 1–1 draw against Pro Sesto. He was released by the club on 1 February 2021 after making seven league appearances.

On 29 March 2021, Serie D club Rotonda announced the signing of Ceesay. On 18 July 2022, he moved to Trapani. However, he couldn't find enough playing time at Trapani and joined fellow Serie D club Brindisi in December 2022.

In July 2025, Ceesay left Virtus Francavilla and joined Termoli.

== International career ==
In March 2022, Ceesay received his first call-up to the Sierra Leone national team for friendly matches against Togo, Liberia and Congo. He made his international debut on 29 March 2022 in a 2–1 win against Congo.

== Career statistics ==
=== International ===
As of match played 29 March 2022

Appearances and goals by national team and year
National team	Year	Apps	Goals
Sierra Leone	2022	1	0
Total		1	0
