= Hieslum =

- Village
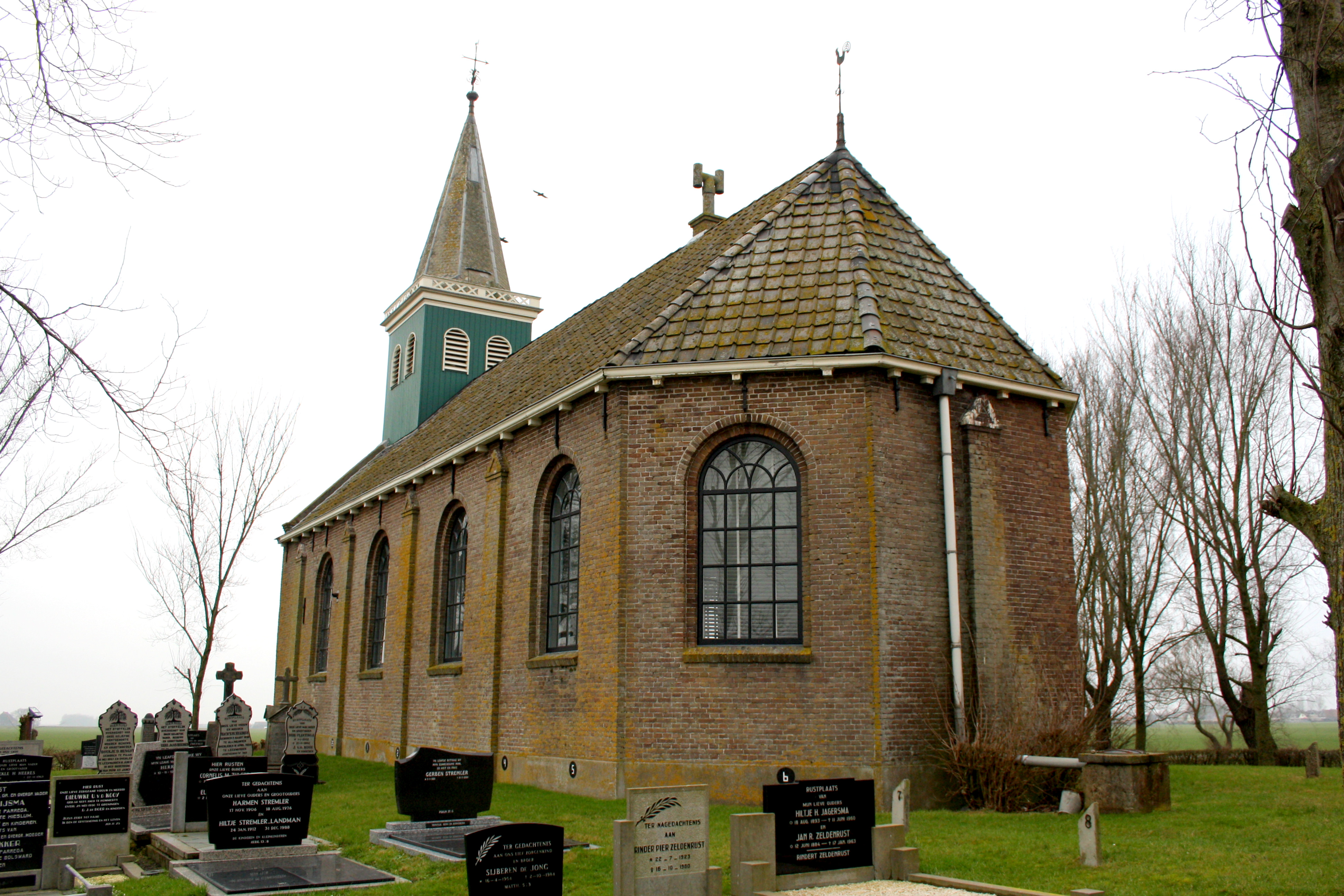
- Hieslum Church

- Flag Coat of arms

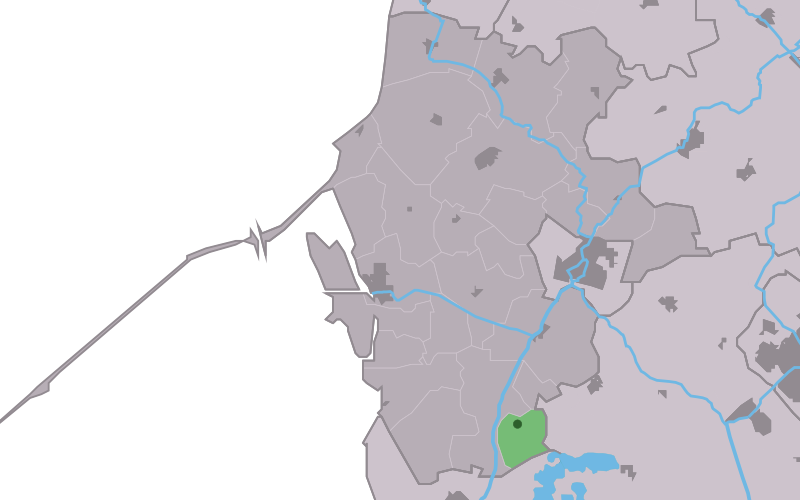
- Location in the former Wûnseradiel municipality

- Location in the Netherlands Hieslum (Netherlands)
- Country: Netherlands
- Province: Friesland
- Municipality: Súdwest-Fryslân

Area
  - Total: 3.16 km^{2} (1.22 sq mi)
- Elevation: 0.1 m (0.33 ft)

Population (2021)
  - Total: 85
  - Density: 27/km^{2} (70/sq mi)
- Time zone: UTC+1 (CET)
  - Summer (DST): UTC+2 (CEST)
- Postal code: 8762
- Dialing code: 0515

Hieslum is a small village in Súdwest-Fryslân in the province of Friesland, Netherlands. It had a population of around 90 in January 2017.

== History ==
The village was first mentioned between 825 and 842 as Hasalon. The name means "settlement near hazel trees (corylus avellana)". Hieslum is a terp (artificial living hill) which used to be located between lakes. The lakes were later poldered.

The Dutch Reformed church was built in 1874 as a replacement of a church from around 1300. It is almost identical to the church of Idsegahuizum.

Hieslum was home to 64 people in 1840. Before 2011, the village was part of the Wûnseradiel municipality.
