= Kisimi Kamara =

Sierra Leonean writer (1890–1962)

Kisimi Kamara (1890–1962) was a village tailor from Sierra Leone who was instrumental in promoting the Mende Kikakui script in the 1920s.

== Early life ==
Kisimi Kamara was born in 1890 in the village of Vaama, Pujehun District in the Southern Province of Sierra Leone to a Kuranko father and a Mandingo mother. His parents had long lived in the Pujehun District, a Mende predominant district. As a child Kisimi had no access to Western education, where he could have learned English. Instead his parents sent him Arabic language school under the local Karamoko.

== Kikakui ==
Kikakui was devised by Mohamed Turay (ca. 1850-1923), Kamara's uncle, father in law, and teacher. It originally had around 42 characters. Kamara adjusted and developed the script further with help from his brothers, adding more than 150 other syllabic characters. He popularized the script, travelling widely in Mendeland and becoming a well-known figure, eventually establishing himself as one of the most important chiefs in southern Sierra Leone in the mid 20th century. He is sometimes erroneously cited as the inventor of Kikakui.

The script achieved widespread use for a time, but has largely been replaced with an alphabet based on the Latin script, and the Mende script is considered a "failed script". Kikakui is still used today by an estimated few hundred individuals.

== Death ==
He died in 1962 and was buried in his home town of Vaama.
