= Moinina Fofana =

Sierra Leonean former military commander

Moinina Fofana (born 1950 in Bullom, Bonthe District, British Sierra Leone) is a Sierra Leonean former military commander who was the leading general in the Kamajors militia and director of the Civil Defence Forces (CDF) during the Sierra Leone Civil War. He was considered to be one of the leaders of the CDF, like Samuel Hinga Norman and Allieu Kondewa.

== Trial and conviction ==
Fofana was indicted by the Special Court for Sierra Leone on charges of crimes against humanity and war crimes. His trial began on 3 June 2004 and was tried alongside his fellow ranking members of the CDF, Kondewa and Norman. According to his indictment, Fofana was the second in command with the CDF to Norman and principally in charge of logistic of the war as the Director of War.

On 2 August 2007 Kondewa and Fofana were convicted of the war crimes of murder, violence to life and mental suffering, pillage, and collective punishments. Fofana was acquitted of related charges of crimes against humanity and the war crime of terrorism. On 9 October 2007, the Court sentenced Fofana to six years imprisonment. Fofana has appealed his conviction to the Court's Appeals Chamber.
