= Osman Yunis =

Sierra Leonean footballer

Personal information
- Full name: Osman Yunis
- Date of birth: March 13, 1982 (age 44)
- Place of birth: Bo, Sierra Leone
- Height: 5 ft 10 in (1.78 m)
- Positions: Left-back; central defender

Team information
- Current team: Ports Authority F.C.

International career
Years	Team	Apps	(Gls)
2002–	Sierra Leone		

Osman Yunis (born March 13, 1982, in Bo, Sierra Leone) is a Sierra Leonean footballer. He plays as a left back or central defender, and is the captain of Ports Authority F.C., one of the top clubs in the Sierra Leone National Premier League. He is also regular for the Leone Stars, Sierra Leone national football team since making his full international debut in 2002 against Gabon in a 2004 African Nations Cup qualifier in Freetown.

== Profile ==
Yunis began his football career with top Sierra Leone National Premier League club Ports Authority. After such an impressive first season, he was immediately called up to the Sierra Leone national team and made his full international in 2002 against Gabon in a 2004 African Nations Cup qualifier in Freetown. Since then, he has established himself as one of the top defenders in the national team.
