= Mende Kikakui script =

Syllabary for the Mende language of Sierra Leone

Mende Kikakui
- Script type: Syllabary
- Creator: Mohamed Turay
- Period: 1917 — present
- Direction: Right-to-left script
- Languages: Mende

ISO 15924
- ISO 15924: Mend (438), Mende Kikakui

Unicode
- Unicode alias: Mende Kikakui
- Unicode range: U+1E800–U+1E8DF; Final Accepted Script Proposal

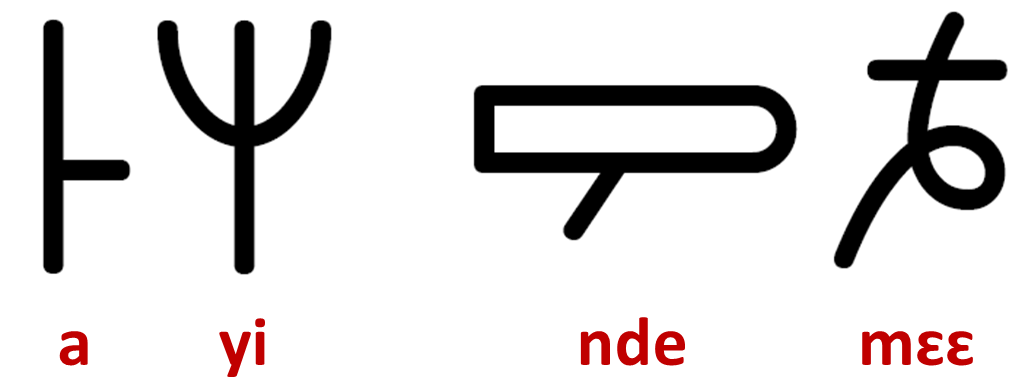
"Mɛɛnde yia" in Mende script Kikakui (read from right to left)

The Mende Kikakui script (Mende: 𞠀𞠁𞠂) is a syllabary used for writing the Mende language of Sierra Leone.

== History ==
The script was devised by Mohamed Turay (ca. 1850-1923), an Islamic scholar, at a town called Maka (Barri Chiefdom, southern Sierra Leone) around 1917. His writing system, an abugida called 'Kikakui' after the first three consonant sounds, was inspired by the Arabic abjad, the Vai syllabary and certain indigenous Mende pictograms and cryptographic characters. It originally had around 42 characters.

One of Turay's Quranic students, as well as his nephew and son-in-law, was a young Kuranko man named Kisimi Kamara. He adjusted and developed the script further with help from his brothers, adding more than 150 other syllabic characters. Kamara popularized the script, travelling widely in Mendeland and becoming a well-known figure, eventually establishing himself as one of the most important chiefs in southern Sierra Leone in the mid 20th century. He is sometimes erroneously cited as the inventor of Kikakui.

The script achieved widespread use for a time, particularly for financial and legal documents. The colonial authorities' choice in the 1930s to use Diedrich Hermann Westermann's Africa Alphabet, based on the Latin script, for writing local languages pushed Kikakui into the background. It is now considered a "failed script".

Kikakui is still used today by an estimated few hundred individuals.

== Usage ==
Methodist missionaries in Sierra Leone considered using Kikakui to transliterate the Bible, but ultimately selected the Africa Alphabet due to the supposed efficiency and ease of writing of an alphabet. Experience, however, proved that a syllabary such as Kikakui was better suited for teaching and learning languages such as Mende that have an 'open syllable' or consonant-vowel (CV) structure.

The script was originally used by specialists who served as record-keepers for the courts and benefited from having a monopoly in its usage. This created resistance to foreign missionaries' attempt to use Kikakui as a language for general instruction and made it seem too 'secret' for local Christians' efforts to promulgate the Bible in a widely understood script, so its usage in a Christian context dwindled. The script is, however, still used for transcribing passages of the Quran.

== Characters ==
The script is written right-to-left. There were an original 42 syllabic characters that were ordered according to sound and shape, while 150 more characters were later added without the same consistency to the character set. Some of the initial 42 characters resemble an abugida, given the standard ability for a reader to discern the vowels from seeing the character, as indicated by dots in consistent locations, but such uniformity vanishes in the remaining 150 characters. Glyphic variants have been found for certain characters.

=== Basic syllables ===
	i	a	u	ee	e	oo	o
k	𞠀	𞠁	𞠂	𞠃	𞠄	𞠅	𞠆
w	𞠈	𞠉	𞠊	𞠋	𞠌	𞠍	𞠎
wv	𞠑	𞠒			𞠓		
b	𞠛	𞠜	𞠝	𞠞	𞠟	𞠠	𞠡
vowels	𞠢	𞠣	𞠤	𞠥	𞠦	𞠧	𞠨
s	𞠮	𞠯	𞠰	𞠱	𞠲	𞠳	𞠴
l	𞠶	𞠷	𞠸	𞠹	𞠺	𞠻	𞠼
d	𞠾	𞠿	𞡀	𞡁		𞡂	𞡃
t	𞡄	𞡅	𞡆	𞡇	𞡈	𞡉	𞡊
j	𞡋	𞡌	𞡍	𞡎	𞡏	𞡐	𞡑
y	𞡓	𞡔	𞡕	𞡖	𞡗	𞡘	𞡙
f	𞡚	𞡛	𞡜	𞡝	𞡞	𞡟	𞡠
h	𞡨	𞡩	𞡪	𞡫	𞡬	𞡭	𞡮
ngg	𞡷	𞡸	𞡹	𞡺	𞡻	𞡼	𞡽
g	𞢃	𞢄	𞢅	𞢆			
p	𞢌	𞢍	𞢎	𞢏	𞢐	𞢑	𞢒
mb	𞢓	𞢔	𞢕	𞢖	𞢘	𞢙	𞢚
kp	𞢟	𞢠	𞢡	𞢢	𞢣	𞢤	𞢥
gb	𞢦	𞢧	𞢨	𞢩	𞢪	𞢫	𞢬
r		𞢭					
nd	𞢮	𞢯	𞢰	𞢱	𞢲	𞢳	𞢴
nj		𞢵	𞢶	𞢷		𞢸	
v	𞢹	𞢺	𞢻	𞢼	𞢽	𞢾	𞢿
	i	a	u	ee	e	oo	o

=== Nasal syllables ===
	in	an	un	en	on	uan	uen
m	𞠔	𞠕	𞠖	𞠗	𞠘	𞠙	𞠚
vowels	𞠪	𞠬		𞠭			
f		𞡢					
n	𞡣	𞡤	𞡥	𞡦	𞡧		
h	𞡱	𞡲	𞡳	𞡴	𞡵	𞡶	
g						𞢈	
ng				𞢉	𞢊	𞢋	
ny	𞣀	𞣁	𞣂	𞣃	𞣄		
	in	an	un	en	on	uan	uen

=== Diphthong syllables ===
	ia	eei	ei	ui	ua	uei	ou
k					𞠇		
w			𞠐	𞠏			
vowels			𞠩				
s	𞠵						
f					𞡡		
h		𞡯					𞡰
ngg					𞡿		
g						𞢇	
	ia	eei	ei	ui	ua	uei	ou

=== Long vowel syllables ===
	aa	uu	ee	long e	long oo	long o
l				𞠽		
j						𞡒
ngg	𞡾			𞢀	𞢁	𞢂
mb		𞢛	𞢗	𞢜	𞢝	𞢞
	aa	uu	ee	long e	long oo	long o

=== Additional syllables ===
Letter	Pronunciation	Function
𞠫	in	Used for the negative particle

=== Numbers ===
1	2	3	4	5	6	7	8	9
𞣇	𞣈	𞣉	𞣊	𞣋	𞣌	𞣍	𞣎	𞣏

The Hindu-Arabic number zero (0) can be used as a standalone number. However, numbers larger than 9 are written in a way unique to the Kikakui script.

Numbers equal to or larger than 10 are written with consideration to their order of magnitude (i.e., Power of 10). The basic numbers (1-9) in the table above are written above each Kikakui symbol for a specific power of 10. The number 30 would be written with the number for 3 (𞣉) written above the symbol for 10^{1} (𞣑 ): 𞣉𞣑. The number 32 would therefore be written as 𞣉𞣑𞣈. Numbers in the Kikakui script, similar to the letters, are written right-to-left. There are symbols for each power of 10 until million. Additionally, there is a distinct symbol to be used with numbers 11-19 ("teens").

	Kikakui	Kikakui Example	Hindu-Arabic Equivalent
Teens	𞣐	𞣇𞣐	11
Tens	𞣑	𞣇𞣑	10
Hundreds	𞣒	𞣇𞣒𞣈𞣑𞣉	123
Thousands	𞣓	𞣇𞣓𞣈𞣒𞣉𞣑𞣊	1,234
Ten thousands	𞣔	𞣇𞣔𞣈𞣓𞣉𞣒𞣊𞣑𞣋	12,345
Hundred thousands	𞣕	𞣇𞣕𞣈𞣔𞣉𞣓𞣊𞣒𞣋𞣑𞣌	123,456
Millions	𞣖	𞣇𞣖𞣈𞣕𞣉𞣔𞣊𞣓𞣋𞣒𞣌𞣑𞣍	1,234,567
	Kikakui	Kikakui Example	Hindu-Arabic Equivalent

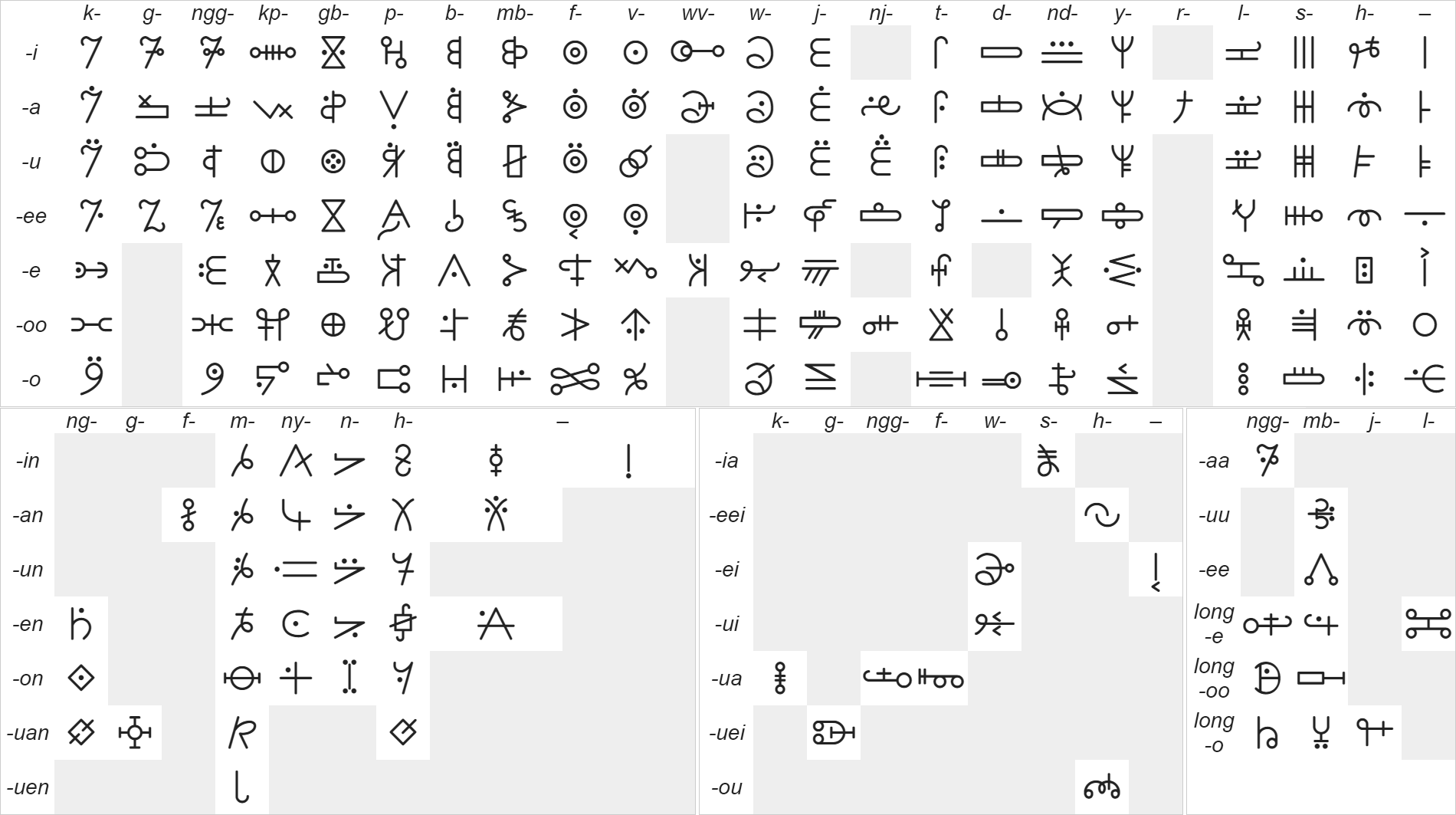
Letters of the Mende Kikakui syllabary.

== Unicode ==
Mende Kikakui script was added to the Unicode Standard in June 2014 with the release of version 7.0.

The Unicode block for Mende Kikakui is U+1E800–U+1E8DF:

Mende Kikakui^{[1]}^{[2]} Official Unicode Consortium code chart (PDF)
	0	1	2	3	4	5	6	7	8	9	A	B	C	D	E	F
U+1E80x	𞠀	𞠁	𞠂	𞠃	𞠄	𞠅	𞠆	𞠇	𞠈	𞠉	𞠊	𞠋	𞠌	𞠍	𞠎	𞠏
U+1E81x	𞠐	𞠑	𞠒	𞠓	𞠔	𞠕	𞠖	𞠗	𞠘	𞠙	𞠚	𞠛	𞠜	𞠝	𞠞	𞠟
U+1E82x	𞠠	𞠡	𞠢	𞠣	𞠤	𞠥	𞠦	𞠧	𞠨	𞠩	𞠪	𞠫	𞠬	𞠭	𞠮	𞠯
U+1E83x	𞠰	𞠱	𞠲	𞠳	𞠴	𞠵	𞠶	𞠷	𞠸	𞠹	𞠺	𞠻	𞠼	𞠽	𞠾	𞠿
U+1E84x	𞡀	𞡁	𞡂	𞡃	𞡄	𞡅	𞡆	𞡇	𞡈	𞡉	𞡊	𞡋	𞡌	𞡍	𞡎	𞡏
U+1E85x	𞡐	𞡑	𞡒	𞡓	𞡔	𞡕	𞡖	𞡗	𞡘	𞡙	𞡚	𞡛	𞡜	𞡝	𞡞	𞡟
U+1E86x	𞡠	𞡡	𞡢	𞡣	𞡤	𞡥	𞡦	𞡧	𞡨	𞡩	𞡪	𞡫	𞡬	𞡭	𞡮	𞡯
U+1E87x	𞡰	𞡱	𞡲	𞡳	𞡴	𞡵	𞡶	𞡷	𞡸	𞡹	𞡺	𞡻	𞡼	𞡽	𞡾	𞡿
U+1E88x	𞢀	𞢁	𞢂	𞢃	𞢄	𞢅	𞢆	𞢇	𞢈	𞢉	𞢊	𞢋	𞢌	𞢍	𞢎	𞢏
U+1E89x	𞢐	𞢑	𞢒	𞢓	𞢔	𞢕	𞢖	𞢗	𞢘	𞢙	𞢚	𞢛	𞢜	𞢝	𞢞	𞢟
U+1E8Ax	𞢠	𞢡	𞢢	𞢣	𞢤	𞢥	𞢦	𞢧	𞢨	𞢩	𞢪	𞢫	𞢬	𞢭	𞢮	𞢯
U+1E8Bx	𞢰	𞢱	𞢲	𞢳	𞢴	𞢵	𞢶	𞢷	𞢸	𞢹	𞢺	𞢻	𞢼	𞢽	𞢾	𞢿
U+1E8Cx	𞣀	𞣁	𞣂	𞣃	𞣄			𞣇	𞣈	𞣉	𞣊	𞣋	𞣌	𞣍	𞣎	𞣏
U+1E8Dx	𞣐	𞣑	𞣒	𞣓	𞣔	𞣕	𞣖									
Notes 1.As of Unicode version 18.0 2.Grey areas indicate non-assigned code points

== Sources ==
- Everson, Michael; Tuchscherer, Konrad (2012-01-24). "N4167: Revised proposal for encoding the Mende script in the SMP of the UCS" (PDF). Working Group Document, ISO/IEC JTC1/SC2/WG2.
- Tuchscherer, Konrad (1995). "African Script and Scripture: The History of the Kikakui (Mende) Writing System for Bible Translations". African Languages and Cultures. 8 (2): 169–188. doi:10.1080/09544169508717794. JSTOR 1771691.
