= Augustine Bockarie =

Sierra Leonean politician

Augustine Bockarie is a Sierra Leonean politician from the Sierra Leone People's Party (SLPP) who was a member of parliament representing Kono District.
