= Niawa Lenga Chiefdom =

- Chiefdom
- Interactive map of Niawa Lenga Chiefdom
- Coordinates: 8°07′41″N 11°39′26″W
- Country: Sierra Leone
- Province: Southern Province
- District: Bo District
- Capital: Nengbema

Area
  - Total: 93 sq mi (241 km^{2})

Population (2015)
  - Total: 13,955
  - Density: 150.3/sq mi (58.02/km^{2})
- Time zone: UTC+0 (GMT)

Niawa Lenga Chiefdom is a chiefdom in the northeastern part of the Bo District, Southern Province of Sierra Leone. Its capital is Nengbema, located 27.6 km northeast of the city of Bo. The area of Niawa Lenga Chiefdom includes 241 km^{2}, derived from geospatial data. The neighbour chiefdoms of Niawa Lenga are: Valunia (north), Komboya (northeast), Bagbwe (east), Kakua (south) and Selenga (west).

== Demographics ==
According to the 2015 census 13.955 people lived in Niawa Lenga chiefdom, 6.789 males and 7.166 females. All inhabitants live in rural areas. In 2004 there were 11.109 inhabitants (5.214 males/5.895 females), which means that there was a population growth of 2.1% per year between 2004 and 2015.

== Sections ==
There are four sections in this chiefdom: Upper Niawa in the Northeast, Yalenga in the Northwest, Lower Niawa in the Center and Baimba in the South. The capital Nengbema is located in the Lower Niawa section.

== Infrastructure and Transport ==
A main (unpaved) west–east highway connects the Niawa Lenga Chiefdom with the Bo-Mogeri-Yele highway in the west and regions east and southeast, namely in the Bagwe, Komboya and Baoma Chiefdoms. 10.5 km of this highway are within the Niawa Lenga Chiefdom. Nengbema and other villages east of it like Nyandeama, Tondoya and Blama, all within the Lower Niawa Section, are located at the highway. Other important villages like Njagbewa in Baima Section, Sahn in Yalenga Section and Ngogbebu in Upper Niawa Section are connected with this west–east highway via minor roads.

== Government and politics ==
The current chief is George Gbaniey Njiabo, elected by the eligible councillors of the chiefdom on December 7, 2002. He received 72 votes, while Emmanuel Kombay-Nallay received 64. The name of the chief was listed as Alhaji George Njiabo by Tristan Reed in 2012. The chief during the civil war, Mrs. Sufi Nail, fled the chiefdom for two years in 1991 until 1993.

According to Reed there are five ruling houses in this chiefdom, namely Njiabo (headquarter: Sahn), Yoki, Nail (headquarter: Njagbewa), Kurabanda and Mone (headquarter of both: Ngogbebu). The fact that these ruling houses have different headquarters points to the fact that Niawa Lenga is an amalgamated chiefdom. The names of the original chiefdoms and the year of amalgamation would have to be added here.
