= Kposowa =

Kposowa is a royal family from Sierra Leone that is of Mende ethnicity. The family is in charge of the Bumpe–Gao Chiefdom located in Bumpe. Notable family members include:

- Frank Kposowa, Sierra Leonean politician
- Princess Esther Kposowa, founder of Sierra Leone Rising (formerly the Kposowa Foundation)
- Augustine Kposowa, American sociologist
