= Jaiama Bongor Chiefdom =

- Chiefdom
- Interactive map of Jaiama Bongor Chiefdom
- Country: Sierra Leone
- Province: Southern Province
- District: Bo District
- Capital: Telu
- Time zone: UTC+0 (GMT)

Jaiama Bongor Chiefdom is a chiefdom in Bo District of Sierra Leone. Its capital is Telu.
