= Dragon beam =

Type of beam used in some timber frames

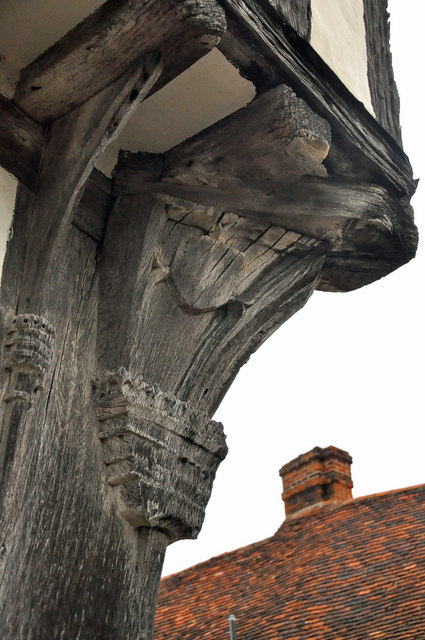
Carved dragon post below a dragon beam - The Old Wool Hall, Lavenham - geograph.org.uk - 1546714

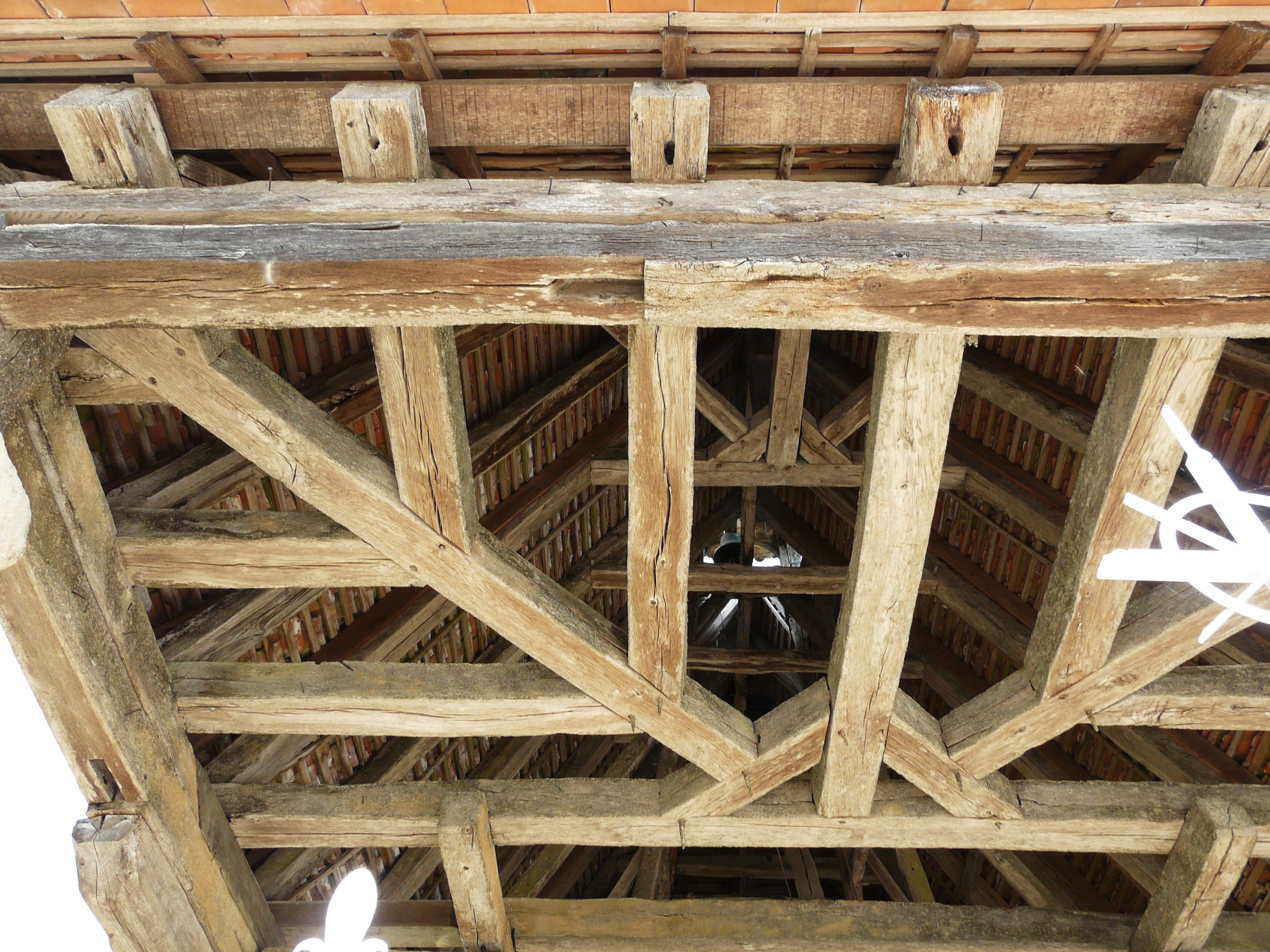
The diagonal beams are dragon beams. Chapel of Our Lady of Good Hope, Azerat, France

Dragon beam is a horizontal, diagonal beam in the corner(s) of some traditional timber-framed buildings. The term is commonly used in both hip roof framing and jettying. Older publications may use the synonyms dragging beam, dragging piece, dragging tie, dragon piece or dragon tie. Inconsistencies in modern usage are discussed below. In French it is called a coyer or enrayure.

== Etymology ==
The etymology of dragon is unclear. The term may be descended from German träger (a carrier), Danish dragere (bearing beam, joist, girder) or Dutch draagbalk (beam). The origin has also been proposed as a corruption of diagonal or diagon.

== Hip roofs ==
The dragon beam lies parallel to and below a hip rafter and carries the rafter. The dragon beam is carried by the wall on the outer end and by a horizontal piece between the two walls on the inside end. There are conflicting usages for this term in the U.K. and U.S.A. (see below). The most common usage seems to be combination dragon beam/cross tie.

- A dragon beam lands on a dragon tie. (U.K.)
- A dragon tie lands on a cross-tie. (U.K.)
- A dragon beam lands on a dragon tie. (U.S.A.)
- "Dragon strut, dragon piece, dragon tie, dragon beam", (French: coyer) lands on a "dragon cross tie" (French: gousset). (U.S.A.)
- A dragon-piece lands on an angle-tie (U.K.)

== Jetties ==
In buildings with jetties on adjacent walls the dragon beam is a horizontal, diagonal beam projecting from a corner which supports the jetties. Sometimes the post below the dragon beam is called a dragon post.
