= Augustine Kposowa =

Sierre Leonean-American sociologist

Augustine Joseph Kposowa
- Education: Saint Paul's College (B.A., 1977), University of Cincinnati (M.A., 1986), Ohio State University (Ph.D., 1990)
- Scientific career
- Fields: Sociology
- Institutions: University of California, Riverside
- Thesis: The effects of immigration on the United States labor market, 1940 to 1980: earnings depression, native displacement, and economic dependence (1990)

Prince Augustine Joseph Kposowa is a Sierra Leonean-American sociologist and previously was a professor of sociology at the University of California, Riverside, where he was also the chair of the sociology department.

== Early life and family ==
Kposowa is from Bumpe, Sierra Leone and is a member of a Mende royal family. His father served as the Paramount Chief of Bumpe. He is the paternal uncle of Princess Sarah Culberson, Lady of Bumpe.

== Education ==
Kposowa received his B.A. from Saint Paul's College in Liberia in 1977, his M.A. from the University of Cincinnati in 1986, and his Ph.D. from Ohio State University in 1990.

== Career ==
Kposowa became an assistant professor at Wayne State University in 1992, and remained there until 1995, when he became an associate professor at the University of California, Riverside. On November 18, 2021, Kposowa was dismissed from University of California, Riverside due to sexual misconduct with an undergraduate student.

== Research ==
Kposowa is known for his research on suicide. For example, his research has shown that divorced men are significantly more likely to commit suicide than their female counterparts, and that Wednesday is the most common day for people to commit suicide. Another study he published found that people who lived in conservative-leaning states and in states with higher gun ownership rates were more likely to commit suicide. The same study, published in 2013, found that people who lived in a state where a higher percent of the population attended church were less likely to commit suicide.
