= Jumu =

Jumu may refer to:

- Luritja, another name of this indigenous Australian Western Desert language
- Arabic for Friday
  - Jumu'ah, Muslim prayer done on Fridays
- Eric B. Jumu, Sierra Leone politician
- Beech wood, in Chinese antique furniture

== See also ==
- Juma people, indigenous people of Brazil
- Jump (disambiguation)
