= Listed buildings in Lavenham =

Civil Parish in Suffolk, England

Lavenham is a village and civil parish in the Babergh District of Suffolk, England. It contains 204 listed buildings that are recorded in the National Heritage List for England. Of these 13 are grade I, 25 are grade II* and 166 are grade II.

This list is based on the information retrieved online from Historic England.

== Key ==
Grade	Criteria
I	Buildings that are of exceptional interest
II*	Particularly important buildings of more than special interest
II	Buildings that are of special interest

== Listing ==
Name	Grade	Location	Type	Completed (Note: The date given is the date used by Historic England as significant for the initial building or that of an important part in the structure's description.)	Date designated	Grid ref. (Note: The grid reference is based on the British national grid reference system, sometimes known as OSGB36, used by the Ordnance Survey.) Geo-coordinates	Notes	Entry number (Note: The "List Entry Number" is a unique number assigned to each listed building and scheduled monument by Historic England.)	Image	Wikidata
The Old Grammar School	I	39, Barn Street	school building		23 January 1958	TL9172449175; 52°06′28″N 0°47′54″E		1351513	The Old Grammar School More images	Q17542422
Molet House	I	Barn Street	house		23 January 1958	TL9165649273; 52°06′31″N 0°47′50″E		1037218	Molet House More images	Q17541874
Premises Occupied by Stocks (metalworkers) Limited Adjoining the Old Grammar School on the South	II	Barn Street			23 January 1958	TL9172749153; 52°06′27″N 0°47′54″E		1037217	Premises Occupied by Stocks (metalworkers) Limited Adjoining the Old Grammar School on the South More images	Q26288914
The Barn	II*	Barn Street	barn		23 January 1958	TL9169249244; 52°06′30″N 0°47′52″E		1037216	The Barn More images	Q17533393
The Grey House	II	Barn Street			11 March 1991	TL9169749172; 52°06′28″N 0°47′52″E		1234891	Upload Photo	Q26528263
Wall Between Molet House and Number 25 Market Place	II	Barn Street			10 July 1980	TL9165149293; 52°06′31″N 0°47′50″E		1351514	Upload Photo	Q26634611
16, Church Street (see Details for Further Address Information)	II	16, Bears Lane			10 July 1980	TL9154249040; 52°06′23″N 0°47′44″E		1285423	Upload Photo	Q26574117
Pedlars Way	II	17, Bears Lane			10 July 1980	TL9151649024; 52°06′23″N 0°47′42″E		1037219	Upload Photo	Q26288916
Mill Cottage	II	Bears Lane			10 July 1980	TL9164648565; 52°06′08″N 0°47′48″E		1180506	Upload Photo	Q26475763
1, Bolton Street	II	1, Bolton Street			10 July 1980	TL9174049356; 52°06′33″N 0°47′55″E		1037220	Upload Photo	Q26288917
High Hall House	II	8 and 9, Bolton Street	hall house		21 March 1962	TL9181049396; 52°06′35″N 0°47′59″E		1037221	High Hall House More images	Q26288919
Lanham Sarina	II	11, Bolton Street	house		21 March 1962	TL9183049410; 52°06′35″N 0°48′00″E		1285429	Lanham Sarina More images	Q26574122
14-17 Bolton Street	II	14-17, Bolton Street			10 July 1980	TL9184949398; 52°06′35″N 0°48′01″E		1037222	Upload Photo	Q26288921
Zivani	II	18, Bolton Street			10 July 1980	TL9183849393; 52°06′34″N 0°48′00″E		1180521	Upload Photo	Q26475778
Crofters	II	20, Bolton Street			10 July 1980	TL9180749380; 52°06′34″N 0°47′58″E		1037223	Upload Photo	Q26288922
27 and 28, Bolton Street	II	27 and 28, Bolton Street	house		10 July 1980	TL9175549348; 52°06′33″N 0°47′56″E		1180530	27 and 28, Bolton Street More images	Q26475790
Dandy Cottage	II	Brent Eleigh Road			10 July 1980	TL9208248515; 52°06′06″N 0°48′11″E		1037224	Upload Photo	Q26288924
Slough Farmhouse	II	Bridge Street Road			10 July 1980	TL9013548858; 52°06′19″N 0°46′30″E		1285402	Upload Photo	Q26574097
Bright's Farmhouse	II	Brights Lane			10 July 1980	TL8999949533; 52°06′41″N 0°46′24″E		1037225	Upload Photo	Q26288925
Barn to the West of Park Farmhouse	II	Bury Road			10 July 1980	TL9037251029; 52°07′29″N 0°46′46″E		1285403	Upload Photo	Q26574098
Park Farmhouse	II	Bury Road			10 July 1980	TL9041251006; 52°07′28″N 0°46′48″E		1037226	Upload Photo	Q26288927
Nos. 1-3, Church Street and No. 74 Water Street	II	1-3, Church Street	building		23 January 1958	TL9154449151; 52°06′27″N 0°47′44″E		1351477	Nos. 1-3, Church Street and No. 74 Water Street More images	Q26634580
4, Church Street	II	4, Church Street			21 March 1962	TL9153749111; 52°06′26″N 0°47′44″E		1285410	Upload Photo	Q26574105
5 and 6, Church Street	II	5 and 6, Church Street			10 July 1980	TL9153349101; 52°06′25″N 0°47′44″E		1037227	Upload Photo	Q26288928
7 and 8, Church Street	II	7 and 8, Church Street			10 July 1980	TL9153449094; 52°06′25″N 0°47′44″E		1180563	Upload Photo	Q26475834
Number 9 Including Outbuilding Adjoining on the North	II*	10, Church Street			23 January 1958	TL9152949073; 52°06′25″N 0°47′43″E		1037228	Number 9 Including Outbuilding Adjoining on the North More images	Q17533405
Blaize House	II*	11 and 12, Church Street	house		23 January 1958	TL9152649062; 52°06′24″N 0°47′43″E		1180575	Blaize House More images	Q17533663
13-15, Church Street	II*	13-15, Church Street	building		23 January 1958	TL9152049054; 52°06′24″N 0°47′43″E		1351478	13-15, Church Street More images	Q17534407
26 and 27, Church Street	II	26 and 27, Church Street			10 July 1980	TL9146649000; 52°06′22″N 0°47′40″E		1180594	Upload Photo	Q26475873
44, Church Street	II	44, Church Street			10 July 1980	TL9134848949; 52°06′21″N 0°47′33″E		1037229	Upload Photo	Q26288929
The Old Tea Shop	II	45 and 46, Church Street			26 July 1977	TL9133548944; 52°06′21″N 0°47′33″E		1180614	Upload Photo	Q26475897
66-68, Church Street	II	66-68, Church Street	house		21 March 1962	TL9139649007; 52°06′23″N 0°47′36″E		1285367	66-68, Church Street More images	Q26574066
69 and 70, Church Street	II	69 and 70, Church Street	cottage		10 July 1980	TL9140549015; 52°06′23″N 0°47′37″E		1037231	69 and 70, Church Street More images	Q26288930
71-74, Church Street	II	71-74, Church Street			10 July 1980	TL9141449023; 52°06′23″N 0°47′37″E		1285370	Upload Photo	Q26574069
75, 76 and 77, Church Street	II	75, 76 and 77, Church Street			21 March 1962	TL9143949040; 52°06′24″N 0°47′38″E		1285373	Upload Photo	Q26574072
78, Church Street	II	78, Church Street	building		10 July 1980	TL9144649043; 52°06′24″N 0°47′39″E		1037232	78, Church Street More images	Q26288931
79 and 80, Church Street	II	79 and 80, Church Street	house		23 January 1958	TL9145449047; 52°06′24″N 0°47′39″E		1180664	79 and 80, Church Street More images	Q26475959
81, Church Street	II*	81, Church Street	building		23 January 1958	TL9146849054; 52°06′24″N 0°47′40″E		1351480	81, Church Street More images	Q17534419
82-84, Church Street	II	82-84, Church Street			10 July 1980	TL9149749067; 52°06′24″N 0°47′42″E		1037233	Upload Photo	Q26288932
85, Church Street	II*	85, Church Street	house		23 January 1958	TL9150349073; 52°06′25″N 0°47′42″E		1180676	85, Church Street More images	Q17533678
86, Church Street	II*	86, Church Street	building		23 January 1958	TL9150649080; 52°06′25″N 0°47′42″E		1037192	86, Church Street More images	Q17533347
87, Church Street	II*	87, Church Street	building		23 January 1958	TL9150849087; 52°06′25″N 0°47′42″E		1351499	87, Church Street More images	Q17534444
88 and 89, Church Street	II*	88 and 89, Church Street	building		23 January 1958	TL9151049092; 52°06′25″N 0°47′42″E		1037193	88 and 89, Church Street More images	Q17533359
90, Church Street	II*	90, Church Street	building		23 January 1958	TL9151449102; 52°06′25″N 0°47′43″E		1037194	90, Church Street More images	Q17533371
91, Church Street	II*	91, Church Street	building		23 January 1958	TL9151649119; 52°06′26″N 0°47′43″E		1351500	91, Church Street More images	Q17534456
The Willows	II*	92, Church Street	house		23 January 1958	TL9151449146; 52°06′27″N 0°47′43″E		1037195	The Willows More images	Q17533382
Church of Saint Peter and Saint Paul	I	Church Street	church building		23 January 1958	TL9128349021; 52°06′23″N 0°47′30″E		1037230	Church of Saint Peter and Saint Paul More images	Q15979484
Cottage in Grounds of Number 92	II	Church Street			10 July 1980	TL9150449134; 52°06′27″N 0°47′42″E		1351501	Upload Photo	Q26634599
K6 Telephone Kiosk	II	Church Street			25 January 1993	TL9146649031; 52°06′23″N 0°47′40″E		1234903	Upload Photo	Q26680372
The Rectory	II	Church Street			21 March 1962	TL9127748866; 52°06′18″N 0°47′30″E		1351479	Upload Photo	Q26634581
Frogs Hall	II	Frogs Hall Road			10 July 1980	TL9184050209; 52°07′01″N 0°48′02″E		1037197	Upload Photo	Q26288889
1, Hall Road	II	1, Hall Road			23 January 1958	TL9149649224; 52°06′29″N 0°47′42″E		1180712	Upload Photo	Q26476020
2, Hall Road	II	2, Hall Road			10 July 1980	TL9148449222; 52°06′29″N 0°47′41″E		1037198	Upload Photo	Q26288890
7-9, Hall Road	II	7-9, Hall Road			10 July 1980	TL9138049236; 52°06′30″N 0°47′36″E		1351503	Upload Photo	Q26634601
Lavenham Hall	II	Hall Road			23 January 1958	TL9125549165; 52°06′28″N 0°47′29″E		1351502	Upload Photo	Q26634600
1, High Street	II	1, High Street			23 January 1958	TL9151649182; 52°06′28″N 0°47′43″E		1180723	Upload Photo	Q26476032
2 High Street	II	2, High Street			23 January 1958	TL9151349188; 52°06′28″N 0°47′43″E		1037199	Upload Photo	Q26288891
3, High Street	II	3, High Street			23 January 1958	TL9150949212; 52°06′29″N 0°47′42″E		1180727	Upload Photo	Q26476036
4 and 5, High Street	II	4 and 5, High Street			23 January 1958	TL9150649224; 52°06′29″N 0°47′42″E		1037200	Upload Photo	Q26288892
6, High Street	II	6, High Street	house		23 January 1958	TL9150249238; 52°06′30″N 0°47′42″E		1285333	6, High Street More images	Q26574034
7-9, High Street	II	7-9, High Street	hall house		23 January 1958	TL9149949245; 52°06′30″N 0°47′42″E		1037201	7-9, High Street More images	Q26288893
10-13, High Street	II*	10-13, High Street	hall house		23 January 1958	TL9150449271; 52°06′31″N 0°47′42″E		1285335	10-13, High Street More images	Q17534127
14 and 14a, High Street	II	14 and 14a, High Street			23 January 1958	TL9150449292; 52°06′32″N 0°47′42″E		1037202	Upload Photo	Q26288895
Garden Cottage	II	15 and 16, High Street			23 January 1958	TL9150849301; 52°06′32″N 0°47′43″E		1351504	Upload Photo	Q26634602
17 and 18, High Street	II	17 and 18, High Street			23 January 1958	TL9151049313; 52°06′32″N 0°47′43″E		1180753	Upload Photo	Q26476066
19 and 20, High Street	II	19 and 20, High Street			21 March 1962	TL9151049323; 52°06′33″N 0°47′43″E		1037203	Upload Photo	Q26288896
21, High Street	II	21, High Street	building		23 January 1958	TL9150849332; 52°06′33″N 0°47′43″E		1285301	21, High Street More images	Q26574006
22-25, High Street	II	22-25, High Street			10 July 1980	TL9151249346; 52°06′33″N 0°47′43″E		1037204	Upload Photo	Q26288897
26-28, High Street	II	26-28, High Street			10 July 1980	TL9152049367; 52°06′34″N 0°47′43″E		1180760	Upload Photo	Q26476074
29, High Street	II	29, High Street			21 March 1962	TL9152549382; 52°06′35″N 0°47′44″E		1351505	Upload Photo	Q26634603
30, High Street	II	30, High Street			21 March 1962	TL9152849389; 52°06′35″N 0°47′44″E		1180764	Upload Photo	Q26476079
31 and 32, High Street	II	31 and 32, High Street			23 January 1958	TL9153149397; 52°06′35″N 0°47′44″E		1037205	Upload Photo	Q26288898
39 and 39a, High Street	II	39 and 39a, High Street	house		23 January 1958	TL9153849433; 52°06′36″N 0°47′44″E		1037206	39 and 39a, High Street More images	Q26288899
Perserverance House	II	47, High Street			10 July 1980	TL9155149488; 52°06′38″N 0°47′45″E		1285308	Upload Photo	Q26574012
Crawley House	II	48, High Street			21 March 1962	TL9155949494; 52°06′38″N 0°47′46″E		1351506	Upload Photo	Q26634604
57, High Street	II	57, High Street			21 March 1962	TL9161549556; 52°06′40″N 0°47′49″E		1285310	Upload Photo	Q26574014
Yaxley Cottage	II	58, High Street			21 March 1962	TL9160649549; 52°06′40″N 0°47′48″E		1037207	Upload Photo	Q26288900
61, High Street	II	61, High Street	house		23 January 1958	TL9158449479; 52°06′38″N 0°47′47″E		1351507	61, High Street More images	Q26634605
62 and 63, High Street	II	62 and 63, High Street	house		23 January 1958	TL9158349475; 52°06′37″N 0°47′47″E		1180786	62 and 63, High Street More images	Q26476102
70 and 71, High Street	II	70 and 71, High Street			10 July 1980	TL9156049429; 52°06′36″N 0°47′46″E		1037208	Upload Photo	Q26288902
72 and 73, High Street	II	72 and 73, High Street			10 July 1980	TL9155949421; 52°06′36″N 0°47′46″E		1351508	Upload Photo	Q26634606
74-79, High Street	II	74-79, High Street			10 July 1980	TL9155349405; 52°06′35″N 0°47′45″E		1180801	Upload Photo	Q26476120
80, High Street	II	80, High Street			10 July 1980	TL9155149387; 52°06′35″N 0°47′45″E		1037209	Upload Photo	Q26288903
81-83, High Street	II	81-83, High Street			10 July 1980	TL9153849365; 52°06′34″N 0°47′44″E		1180813	Upload Photo	Q26476131
84 and 85, High Street	II	84 and 85, High Street			10 July 1980	TL9153849338; 52°06′33″N 0°47′44″E		1037210	Upload Photo	Q26288905
Little Kentwell	II	86, High Street			21 March 1962	TL9153049319; 52°06′32″N 0°47′44″E		1285290	Upload Photo	Q26573996
Hall House	II	87 and 88, High Street	hall house		23 January 1958	TL9153449297; 52°06′32″N 0°47′44″E		1351509	Hall House More images	Q26634607
Cordwinders	II	89, High Street	house		23 January 1958	TL9153149291; 52°06′32″N 0°47′44″E		1180830	Cordwinders More images	Q26476148
90-92, High Street	II	90-92, High Street			23 January 1958	TL9153049270; 52°06′31″N 0°47′44″E		1037211	Upload Photo	Q26288907
93 and 94, High Street	II	93 and 94, High Street			23 January 1958	TL9153449260; 52°06′31″N 0°47′44″E		1180851	Upload Photo	Q26476175
95, High Street	II	95, High Street			23 January 1958	TL9153449253; 52°06′30″N 0°47′44″E		1351510	Upload Photo	Q26634608
The Greyhound Inn	II	96, High Street	inn		23 January 1958	TL9152849240; 52°06′30″N 0°47′44″E		1037172	The Greyhound Inn More images	Q26288872
97, High Street	II*	97, High Street	building		23 January 1958	TL9153149228; 52°06′30″N 0°47′44″E		1351528	97, High Street More images	Q17534469
98-100, High Street	II*	98-100, High Street	building		23 January 1958	TL9153449215; 52°06′29″N 0°47′44″E		1037173	98-100, High Street More images	Q17533288
Swan Hotel, formerly Part of Swan Hotel	II*	High Street at corner to Water Street			23 January 1958	TL9154149173; 52°06′28″N 0°47′44″E		1037175	Swan Hotel, formerly Part of Swan Hotel More images	Q17533311
Swan Hotel, formerly 101 High Street	II*	High Street			23 January 1958	TL9153649201; 52°06′29″N 0°47′44″E		1351529	Swan Hotel, formerly 101 High Street More images	Q17534481
Swan Hotel, formerly 102 High Street	II*	High Street			23 January 1958	TL9153949186; 52°06′28″N 0°47′44″E		1037174	Swan Hotel, formerly 102 High Street More images	Q17533299
Swan Hotel, formerly 1 Water Street	II	Water Street			10 July 1980	TL9156649167; 52°06′28″N 0°47′45″E		1037165	Swan Hotel, formerly 1 Water Street More images	Q26288865
Swan Hotel, formerly listed as premises adjoining No 1 on the east and extension of Old Wood Hall on the west	II	Water Street			23 January 1958	TL9157549166; 52°06′27″N 0°47′46″E		1181300	Swan Hotel, formerly listed as premises adjoining No 1 on the east and extension of Old Wood Hall on the west More images	Q26476626
Swan Hotel, part formerly The Old Wool Hall	I	Lady Street	hotel		23 January 1958	TL9159449167; 52°06′27″N 0°47′47″E		1285221	Swan Hotel, part formerly The Old Wool Hall More images	Q15241948
K6 Telephone Kiosk	II	High Street			21 September 1987	TL9153249350; 52°06′33″N 0°47′44″E		1234815	Upload Photo	Q26528195
United Reformed Church	II	High Street	church building		10 July 1980	TL9160149492; 52°06′38″N 0°47′48″E		1180782	United Reformed Church More images	Q26476098
1, Lady Street	II	1, Lady Street			23 January 1958	TL9159649272; 52°06′31″N 0°47′47″E		1351530	1, Lady Street	Q26634624
3 and 4 Lady Street	II	3 and 4, Lady Street	house		23 January 1958	TL9160249253; 52°06′30″N 0°47′47″E		1037176	3 and 4 Lady Street More images	Q26288873
The Grove	II	5, Lady Street			23 January 1958	TL9160949225; 52°06′29″N 0°47′48″E		1351531	Upload Photo	Q26634625
6, Lady Street	II	6, Lady Street			23 January 1958	TL9161149188; 52°06′28″N 0°47′48″E		1037177	Upload Photo	Q26288875
7-9, Lady Street	II	7-9, Lady Street			23 January 1958	TL9161049180; 52°06′28″N 0°47′48″E		1180920	Upload Photo	Q26476253
1, Market Lane	II	1, Market Lane			23 January 1958	TL9154649292; 52°06′32″N 0°47′45″E		1037178	Upload Photo	Q26288876
2-5, Market Lane	II	2-5, Market Lane			23 January 1958	TL9155349306; 52°06′32″N 0°47′45″E		1181030	Upload Photo	Q26476378
6 and 7, Market Place	II	6 and 7, Market Place			23 January 1979	TL9156649309; 52°06′32″N 0°47′46″E		1181032	Upload Photo	Q26476380
8 and 9, Market Place	II	8 and 9, Market Place			23 January 1958	TL9157149322; 52°06′33″N 0°47′46″E		1037180	Upload Photo	Q26288878
10, Market Place	II	10, Market Place			23 January 1958	TL9157749331; 52°06′33″N 0°47′46″E		1037181	Upload Photo	Q26288879
11 Market Place	II	11, Market Place	shop		23 January 1958	TL9157949337; 52°06′33″N 0°47′46″E		1285193	11 Market Place More images	Q26573906
12, Market Place	II	12, Market Place			23 January 1958	TL9158149346; 52°06′33″N 0°47′47″E		1037182	Upload Photo	Q26288880
13, Market Place	II	13, Market Place	shop		23 January 1958	TL9158649355; 52°06′34″N 0°47′47″E		1285194	13, Market Place More images	Q26573907
14 and 15, Market Place	II	14 and 15, Market Place			23 January 1958	TL9159249362; 52°06′34″N 0°47′47″E		1037183	Upload Photo	Q26288881
16 and 17, Market Place	II	16 and 17, Market Place			23 January 1958	TL9160349368; 52°06′34″N 0°47′48″E		1285197	Upload Photo	Q26573910
Angel Hotel	II*	18, Market Place	hotel		23 January 1958	TL9161549357; 52°06′34″N 0°47′48″E		1037184	Angel Hotel More images	Q17533324
25, Market Place	II	25, Market Place			21 March 1962	TL9164149307; 52°06′32″N 0°47′50″E		1037185	Upload Photo	Q26288882
26, Market Place	I	26, Market Place	building		23 January 1958	TL9161849300; 52°06′32″N 0°47′48″E		1181069	26, Market Place More images	Q17542139
27 and 28, Market Place	I	27 and 28, Market Place	building		23 January 1958	TL9160949293; 52°06′32″N 0°47′48″E		1351534	27 and 28, Market Place More images	Q17542454
Pasha Pecketts Cottage	II	29 and 30, Market Place			18 May 1977	TL9161649318; 52°06′32″N 0°47′48″E		1181080	Upload Photo	Q26476424
Toll Cottage	II	31, Market Place	cottage		23 January 1958	TL9161149325; 52°06′33″N 0°47′48″E		1181093	Toll Cottage More images	Q26476437
Market House	II	35 and 36, Market Place	house		10 July 1980	TL9157449285; 52°06′31″N 0°47′46″E		1037187	Market House More images	Q26288883
37-39, Market Place	II	37-39, Market Place			10 July 1980	TL9156949296; 52°06′32″N 0°47′46″E		1285179	Upload Photo	Q26573893
Little Hall	II*	Market Place	house		23 January 1958	TL9163749327; 52°06′33″N 0°47′49″E		1351533	Little Hall More images	Q17534494
Market Cross	II	Market Place	market cross		23 January 1958	TL9160349330; 52°06′33″N 0°47′48″E		1037179	Market Cross More images	Q17641613
The Great House	II*	Market Place	restaurant		23 January 1958	TL9162749339; 52°06′33″N 0°47′49″E		1181062	The Great House More images	Q17533687
The Guildhall	I	Market Place	local museum		23 January 1958	TL9159749287; 52°06′31″N 0°47′47″E		1037186	The Guildhall More images	Q15241947
2, Prentice Street	II	2, Prentice Street	house		21 March 1962	TL9166149388; 52°06′35″N 0°47′51″E		1351495	2, Prentice Street More images	Q26634595
3 and 5, Prentice Street	II	3 and 5, Prentice Street	house		23 January 1958	TL9167249398; 52°06′35″N 0°47′51″E		1181109	3 and 5, Prentice Street More images	Q26476451
7-10, Prentice Street	II	7-10, Prentice Street	house		23 January 1958	TL9168449406; 52°06′35″N 0°47′52″E		1037188	7-10, Prentice Street More images	Q26288885
Crossover Cottage	II	13, Prentice Street	cottage		23 January 1958	TL9170749419; 52°06′35″N 0°47′53″E		1351496	Crossover Cottage More images	Q26634596
14-17, Prentice Street	II	14-17, Prentice Street			10 July 1980	TL9171449424; 52°06′36″N 0°47′54″E		1285146	Upload Photo	Q26573860
18-20, Prentice Street	II	18-20, Prentice Street			10 July 1980	TL9172649431; 52°06′36″N 0°47′54″E		1037189	Upload Photo	Q26288886
Box Cottage	II	21, Prentice Street	cottage		10 July 1980	TL9173749438; 52°06′36″N 0°47′55″E		1285151	Box Cottage More images	Q26573865
Woolstaplers	II*	23 and 24, Prentice Street	hall house		23 January 1958	TL9175649454; 52°06′37″N 0°47′56″E		1037190	Woolstaplers More images	Q17533336
25 and 26, Prentice Street	II	25 and 26, Prentice Street	house		23 January 1958	TL9177949461; 52°06′37″N 0°47′57″E		1285157	25 and 26, Prentice Street More images	Q26573871
27, Prentice Street	II	27, Prentice Street	house		23 January 1958	TL9181949461; 52°06′37″N 0°47′59″E		1181151	27, Prentice Street More images	Q26476489
Spinners	II	29 and 30, Prentice Street			23 January 1958	TL9180449454; 52°06′37″N 0°47′58″E		1037191	Upload Photo	Q26288887
31, Prentice Street	II	31, Prentice Street			21 March 1962	TL9179749446; 52°06′36″N 0°47′58″E		1351498	Upload Photo	Q26634598
32, Prentice Street	II	32, Prentice Street			6 October 1977	TL9174749420; 52°06′35″N 0°47′55″E		1351518	Upload Photo	Q26634613
33-35, Prentice Street	II	33-35, Prentice Street	hall house		21 March 1962	TL9172949413; 52°06′35″N 0°47′54″E		1037151	33-35, Prentice Street More images	Q26288848
36 and 37, Prentice Street	II	36 and 37, Prentice Street	house		23 January 1958	TL9171849406; 52°06′35″N 0°47′54″E		1037152	36 and 37, Prentice Street More images	Q26288849
38 and 39, Prentice Street	II	38 and 39, Prentice Street			23 January 1958	TL9171749399; 52°06′35″N 0°47′54″E		1351519	Upload Photo	Q26634614
40, Prentice Street	II	40, Prentice Street			21 March 1962	TL9169749392; 52°06′35″N 0°47′53″E		1037153	Upload Photo	Q26288851
41-43, Prentice Street	II	41-43, Prentice Street	house		21 March 1962	TL9168849386; 52°06′34″N 0°47′52″E		1351520	41-43, Prentice Street More images	Q26634615
44, Prentice Street	II	44, Prentice Street	house		23 January 1958	TL9167449378; 52°06′34″N 0°47′51″E		1037154	44, Prentice Street More images	Q26288853
Mill House	II	46, Prentice Street, Sudbury, CO10 9RD			21 March 1962	TL9165849361; 52°06′34″N 0°47′51″E		1037157	Upload Photo	Q26288856
47 Prentice Street	II	47, Prentice Street			10 July 1980	TL9164049353; 52°06′33″N 0°47′50″E		1181234	Upload Photo	Q26476567
Baker's Mill	II	Prentice Street			10 July 1980	TL9168349358; 52°06′34″N 0°47′52″E		1351521	Upload Photo	Q26634616
Granary	II	Prentice Street	house		10 July 1980	TL9181449495; 52°06′38″N 0°47′59″E		1351497	Granary More images	Q26634597
Maltings to Baker's Mill	II	Prentice Street			10 July 1980	TL9168249319; 52°06′32″N 0°47′52″E		1037155	Upload Photo	Q26288854
Wall Extending Between the South West Corner of the Maltings in Bolton Street and Little House in Market Place	II	Prentice Street			10 July 1980	TL9165749302; 52°06′32″N 0°47′50″E		1037156	Upload Photo	Q26288855
1, Shilling Street	II	1, Shilling Street	building		23 January 1958	TL9173849292; 52°06′31″N 0°47′55″E		1037158	1, Shilling Street More images	Q26288857
2 and 3, Shilling Street	II	2 and 3, Shilling Street	house		23 January 1958	TL9174549281; 52°06′31″N 0°47′55″E		1181240	2 and 3, Shilling Street More images	Q26476573
4-6, Shilling Street	II	4-6, Shilling Street			23 January 1958	TL9175349269; 52°06′31″N 0°47′55″E		1037159	Upload Photo	Q26288858
7 and 8, Shilling Street	II	7 and 8, Shilling Street	house		23 January 1958	TL9175949260; 52°06′30″N 0°47′56″E		1181251	7 and 8, Shilling Street More images	Q26476582
9, Shilling Street	II	9, Shilling Street	cottage		23 January 1958	TL9176449253; 52°06′30″N 0°47′56″E		1037160	9, Shilling Street More images	Q26288860
10-12, Shilling Street	II	10-12, Shilling Street			10 July 1980	TL9177249242; 52°06′30″N 0°47′56″E		1181259	Upload Photo	Q26476588
Wellington House	II	14, Shilling Street, Sudbury, CO10 9RH	house		21 March 1962	TL9178049226; 52°06′29″N 0°47′57″E		1037161	Wellington House More images	Q26288861
Arundel House	II	17, Shilling Street	house		23 January 1958	TL9179849165; 52°06′27″N 0°47′58″E		1037163	Arundel House More images	Q26288863
18, Shilling Street	II	18, Shilling Street			10 July 1980	TL9180849137; 52°06′26″N 0°47′58″E		1181289	Upload Photo	Q26476616
19, Shilling Street	II	19, Shilling Street	hall house		23 January 1958	TL9176049234; 52°06′29″N 0°47′56″E		1351522	19, Shilling Street More images	Q26634618
20, Shilling Street	II	20, Shilling Street			23 January 1958	TL9175749242; 52°06′30″N 0°47′56″E		1181292	Upload Photo	Q26476619
21, Shilling Street	II	21, Shilling Street	house		23 January 1958	TL9175149251; 52°06′30″N 0°47′55″E		1037164	21, Shilling Street More images	Q26288864
22-24, Shilling Street	II	22-24, Shilling Street	house		23 January 1958	TL9173749268; 52°06′31″N 0°47′55″E		1181296	22-24, Shilling Street More images	Q26476623
Shilling Grange and Shilling Old Grange Cottage	I	Shilling Street, CO10 9RH	building		23 January 1958	TL9179249195; 52°06′28″N 0°47′57″E		1285097	Shilling Grange and Shilling Old Grange Cottage More images	Q17542343
Wall Between Wellington House and Shilling Grange	II	Shilling Street, CO10 9RH			10 July 1980	TL9178149212; 52°06′29″N 0°47′57″E		1037162	Upload Photo	Q26288862
Bridge Farmhouse	II	Sudbury Road			10 July 1980	TL9147147894; 52°05′46″N 0°47′38″E		1351523	Upload Photo	Q26634619
The Thatched Cottage	II	The Common			10 July 1980	TL9191649157; 52°06′27″N 0°48′04″E		1037196	Upload Photo	Q26288888
Tudor Shops	I	6, Water Street	architectural structure		23 January 1958	TL9161249155; 52°06′27″N 0°47′48″E		1351532	Tudor Shops More images	Q17542442
7-9, Water Street	I	7-9, Water Street	building		23 January 1958	TL9163149147; 52°06′27″N 0°47′49″E		1285044	7-9, Water Street More images	Q17542332
12 and 14, Water Street	II	12 and 14, Water Street	antique shop		21 March 1962	TL9166449138; 52°06′26″N 0°47′50″E		1037166	12 and 14, Water Street More images	Q26288866
15-20, Water Street	II	15-20, Water Street			10 July 1980	TL9168049132; 52°06′26″N 0°47′51″E		1351524	15-20, Water Street More images	Q26634620
The Sparrows	II	21-22, Water Street, CO10 9RW			10 July 1980	TL9169649129; 52°06′26″N 0°47′52″E		1181320	The Sparrows More images	Q26476646
23 and 24, Water Street	II	23 and 24, Water Street			23 January 1958	TL9173749121; 52°06′26″N 0°47′54″E		1181324	23 and 24, Water Street More images	Q26476650
25 and 26, Water Street	II	25 and 26, Water Street	cottage		23 January 1958	TL9174649119; 52°06′26″N 0°47′55″E		1351525	25 and 26, Water Street More images	Q26634621
27, Water Street	II	27, Water Street	building		23 January 1958	TL9175249117; 52°06′26″N 0°47′55″E		1285051	27, Water Street More images	Q26573774
28, Water Street	II	28, Water Street			23 January 1958	TL9175749119; 52°06′26″N 0°47′55″E		1037168	28, Water Street More images	Q26288868
Teazle Cottage	II	29 and 30, Water Street			23 January 1958	TL9176549118; 52°06′26″N 0°47′56″E		1285054	Teazle Cottage More images	Q26573776
31, Water Street	II	31, Water Street			23 January 1958	TL9177349114; 52°06′26″N 0°47′56″E		1037169	31, Water Street More images	Q26288869
32 and 33, Water Street	II	32 and 33, Water Street			23 January 1958	TL9178749113; 52°06′26″N 0°47′57″E		1351526	32 and 33, Water Street More images	Q26634622
34, Water Street	II	34, Water Street			23 January 1958	TL9179349113; 52°06′25″N 0°47′57″E		1181347	34, Water Street More images	Q26476673
37, Water Street	II	37, Water Street			10 July 1980	TL9180849114; 52°06′26″N 0°47′58″E		1037170	37, Water Street More images	Q26288870
39, Water Street	II	39, Water Street, CO10 9RN	house		21 March 1962	TL9181449111; 52°06′25″N 0°47′58″E		1181354	39, Water Street More images	Q26476679
48 and 49, Water Street	II	48 and 49, Water Street			10 July 1980	TL9175549103; 52°06′25″N 0°47′55″E		1181368	48 and 49, Water Street More images	Q26476691
50, Water Street	II	50, Water Street			10 July 1980	TL9174849098; 52°06′25″N 0°47′55″E		1037171	Upload Photo	Q26288871
51 and 52, Water Street	II	51 and 52, Water Street	building		23 January 1958	TL9174149104; 52°06′25″N 0°47′54″E		1285030	51 and 52, Water Street More images	Q26573755
53 and 54, Water Street	II	53 and 54, Water Street	building		23 January 1958	TL9173449102; 52°06′25″N 0°47′54″E		1351548	53 and 54, Water Street More images	Q26634637
The Manor House	II*	55, Water Street	house		23 January 1958	TL9171849107; 52°06′25″N 0°47′53″E		1037129	The Manor House More images	Q17533263
56 and 57, Water Street	II	56 and 57, Water Street	building		23 January 1958	TL9170449111; 52°06′26″N 0°47′53″E		1351549	56 and 57, Water Street More images	Q26634639
58, Water Street	II*	58, Water Street	building		23 January 1958	TL9169149113; 52°06′26″N 0°47′52″E		1037130	58, Water Street More images	Q17533275
61, Water Street	II	61, Water Street			21 March 1962	TL9165549121; 52°06′26″N 0°47′50″E		1351550	61, Water Street More images	Q26634640
62, Water Street	II	62, Water Street			10 July 1980	TL9164949122; 52°06′26″N 0°47′50″E		1037132	62, Water Street More images	Q26288828
64 and 65, Water Street	II	64 and 65, Water Street			10 July 1980	TL9163949121; 52°06′26″N 0°47′49″E		1351551	Upload Photo	Q26634641
66, Water Street	II	66, Water Street			23 January 1958	TL9163049124; 52°06′26″N 0°47′49″E		1037133	66, Water Street More images	Q26288829
67 and 68, Water Street	I	67 and 68, Water Street	building		23 January 1958	TL9161749135; 52°06′26″N 0°47′48″E		1037134	67 and 68, Water Street More images	Q17541861
The Priory	I	69, Water Street	priory		23 January 1958	TL9160449129; 52°06′26″N 0°47′47″E		1285004	The Priory More images	Q6502556
70, Water Street	II	70, Water Street			23 January 1958	TL9156849147; 52°06′27″N 0°47′45″E		1037135	70, Water Street More images	Q26288830
71-73, Water Street	II	71-73, Water Street, CO10 9RW			23 January 1958	TL9155849152; 52°06′27″N 0°47′45″E		1181407	71-73, Water Street More images	Q26476728
De Vere House	I	Water Street, CO10 9RW	cottage		23 January 1958	TL9166349118; 52°06′26″N 0°47′50″E		1037131	De Vere House More images	Q17541849
Flats Owned by Swan Hotel Adjoining Number 22 on the East	II	Water Street			10 July 1980	TL9171849122; 52°06′26″N 0°47′53″E		1037167	Flats Owned by Swan Hotel Adjoining Number 22 on the East More images	Q26288867
Number 47 and Premises Owned by Terence Dalton Limited Publishers Adjoining Number 47 on the East	II	Water Street	house		23 January 1958	TL9178649099; 52°06′25″N 0°47′57″E		1351527	Number 47 and Premises Owned by Terence Dalton Limited Publishers Adjoining Number 47 on the East More images	Q26634623

== See also ==
- Grade I listed buildings in Suffolk
- Grade II* listed buildings in Suffolk

== Sources ==
- Bettely, James; Pevsner, Nikolaus (2015) [1961], Suffolk: West, The Buildings of England, New Haven and London: Yale University Press, ISBN 978-0-300-19655-9
