= William Shelford (engineer) =

English civil engineer

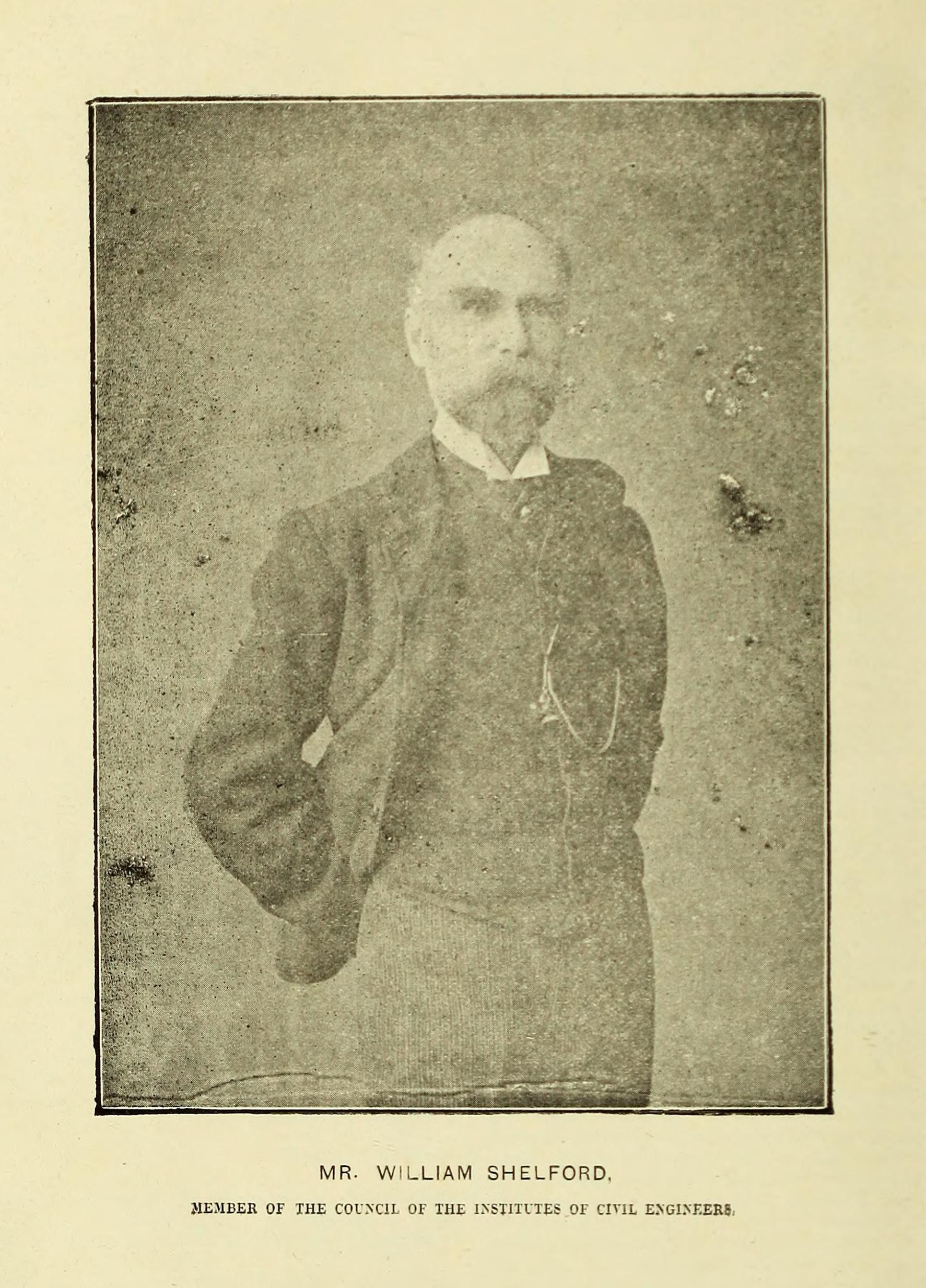

Sir William Shelford KCMG (1834–1905) was an English civil engineer.

== Early life ==
Born at Lavenham, Suffolk on 11 April 1834, he was eldest son of Rev William Heard Shelford (1799–1856), Fellow of Emmanuel College, Cambridge, and rector of Preston St. Mary, Suffolk; his mother was Emily Frost née Snape (1809–1889), eldest daughter of Rev. Richard Snape, rector of Brent Eleigh. Among his brothers, Thomas Shelford (1839–1900) became a member of the legislative council of the Straits Settlements, and was made C.M.G., while Rev. Leonard Edmund Shelford (1836–1914) was a clergyman who became vicar of St Martin-in-the-Fields in 1903 and whose brother-in-law was the evangelist William Cadman. In February 1850 Shelford went to Marlborough College, leaving at midsummer 1852 to become an engineer. He was first apprenticed to a mechanical engineer in Scotland, but in 1854 he became a pupil of William Gale, a waterworks engineer of Glasgow. During his two years' term of service he attended lectures at Glasgow University.

== Engineer and partner ==
In 1856, thrown on his own resources after his father's death, Shelford left Glasgow for London, and in December of that year he entered the office of John Fowler as an assistant engineer, remaining there until 1860. He was engaged on the Nene River navigation and improvement works, of which he was in time placed in charge, until 1859, when he was transferred to London and was engaged on the laying-out and construction of the first section of the Metropolitan Railway. Leaving Fowler's service in the autumn of 1860, Shelford became an assistant to F. T. Turner, joint engineer with Joseph Cubitt on the London, Chatham and Dover Railway.

After employment on surveys Shelford was appointed resident engineer on the high-level railway to the Crystal Palace, the Act of Parliament for which was passed in 1862. Apart from decorative work on the stations, he designed and superintended all the engineering works on that line. In 1862–5 he was also engaged, under Turner, as resident engineer on the eastern section of the London, Chatham and Dover Railway, to Blackheath Hill.

In 1865 Shelford started practice on his own account in partnership with Henry Robinson, later professor of engineering at King's College, London. The work carried out by the firm during the next ten years included the railways, waterworks, sewage-works and pumping- and winding-engines, and shafts for collieries and mines at home and abroad. In 1869 he visited Sicily and installed machinery and plant for sulphur mines there; for his services he was made a chevalier of the Order of the Crown of Italy. The partnership was terminated in 1875.

== Later life ==
Shelford practised at 35a Great George Street, Westminster, taking his third son, Frederic, into partnership in 1899, and ceasing to work in 1904. In 1881 he was appointed engineer of the Hull and Barnsley Railway, his major piece of railway construction at home. The line was opened in June 1885, and extensions to Huddersfield and Halifax were made subsequently. Shelford was consulting engineer to the corporation of Edinburgh on the enlargement of Waverley Station and the attempt of the Caledonian Railway Company to carry its line into Edinburgh; other work in Scotland included the Brechin and Edzell District Railway, carried out in 1893–5.

Shelford reported on railway schemes abroad, visiting Canada in 1885, Italy in 1889, and the Argentine in 1890. With Sir Frederick Bramwell he was consulting engineer to the Winnipeg and Hudson's Bay Railway, and under their direction forty miles of this line from Winnipeg were completed in January 1887.

Railway network of Sierra Leone

His chief work abroad and the main work of his later years was the construction of railways in West Africa, in which he acted as consulting engineer to the crown agents for the colonies. After preliminary surveys, begun in 1893, the Sierra Leone Government Railway was constructed as a line of 2 ft. 6 in. gauge. Track from Freetown, Sierra Leone, to Songo was started in March 1896 and opened in 1899. This line was gradually extended until, in August 1905, shortly before Shelford's death, it had reached Baiima, 220 miles from Freetown. In the Gold Coast Colony a line of 3 ft. 6 in. gauge from Sekondi to Tarkwa was begun in 1898 and completed in May 1901. By October 1903 the line had been extended as far as Kumasi, 168 miles from Sekondi. In the colony of Lagos a line from Lagos to Ibadan (123 miles) was completed in March 1901. A short railway, six miles in length, from Sierra Leone to the heights above Freetown, was opened in 1904, and road-bridges were built to connect the island of Lagos with the mainland.

Shelford's services were recognised by the honour of the C.M.G. in 1901 and the K.C.M.G. in 1904. He had been elected a member of the Institution of Civil Engineers on 10 April 1866, and from 1887 to 1897 and from 1901 till death was a member of the council. In 1888 he was a vice-president of the mechanical science section of the British Association. He was a fellow of the Royal Geographical and other societies, and served on the engineering standards committee as a representative of the crown agents for the colonies.

After his retirement from practice Shelford resided at 49 Argyll Road, Kensington, where he died on 3 October 1905. He was buried in Brompton cemetery.

== Works ==
In 1869 Shelford presented to the Institution of Civil Engineers a paper On the Outfall of the River Humber, for which he received a Telford medal and premium. In 1879 he examined the River Tiber and reported upon a modification of a scheme proposed by Garibaldi for the diversion of the floods of that river. For his paper presented in 1885 to the institution, On Rivers flowing into Tideless Seas, illustrated by the River Tiber, he was awarded a Telford premium. At the British Association Shelford read two papers, in 1885 on Some Points for the Consideration of English Engineers with Reference to the Design of Girder Bridges, and in 1887 on The Improvement of the Access to the Mersey Ports.

== Family ==
Shelford married in 1863 Anna née Sopwith (1840–1921), daughter of Thomas Sopwith, who survived him; they had eight children.

- Emily 'Lily' Shelford (1863–1891) who was the second wife of Clement Sneyd Colvin (1844–1901)
- Mabel Shelford (1865–1944)
- Leonard R Shelford (1867–1889)
- William Sopwith Shelford (1868–1940) who married Flora Joan née McVean, he was a Commander in the Orient shipping line.
- Frederick Shelford (1871–1943) who married Mildred Alice née Ommanney (1877–1965) daughter of Sir Montagu Frederick Ommanney
- Arthur Shelford (1873–1873)
- Anna Elizabeth Shelford (1875–1924) who married Robert Basil Feilden (1864–1927)
- Thomas 'Tom' Shelford (1879–1931) an actor, who married Ellen Lett née Nuthall an actress with the stage name Ella Daincourt

== Notes ==
Attribution

This article incorporates text from a publication now in the public domain: Lee, Sidney, ed. (1912). "Shelford, William". Dictionary of National Biography (2nd supplement). Vol. 3. London: Smith, Elder & Co.
