= Mongeri =

- Location in Sierra Leone
- Coordinates: 8°19′N 11°44′W
- Country: Sierra Leone
- Province: Southern Province
- District: Bo District
- Chiefdom: Valunia Chiefdom

Population (2004)
  - Total: 14,273 (est)
- Time zone: UTC-5 (GMT)

Mongeri is a town in Bo District in the Southern Province of Sierra Leone. Its population was estimated at 14,273 (2004 census). The population of Mongeri is mostly from the Mende ethnic group. It is the birthplace of Samuel Hinga Norman, the founder and leader of the traditional Civil Defence Forces (commonly known as the Kamajors).
