= Mamboma =

Village in Southern Province, Sierra Leone

Mamboma is a village in Bo District in the Southern Province of Sierra Leone. The predominant ethnic group in the village are the Mende and the Mende language is widely spoken throughout the village.
