= Richard of Lavenham =

English Carmelite and scholastic philosopher

Richard of Lavenham (fl. 1380) was an English Carmelite, known as a scholastic philosopher. He is now remembered for his approach to the problem of future contingents.

== Life ==
He was born at Lavenham, Suffolk, and, after becoming a Carmelite friar at Ipswich, studied at the University of Oxford, where he is said to have graduated D.D.; but in the colophon to his tract against John Purvey he is called simply 'magister'.

Lavenham was later prior of the Carmelite house at Bristol.

== Works ==
Lavenham enjoyed a reputation as a theologian and schoolman. John Bale gives a list of sixty-one treatises ascribed to him, De Villiers names sixty-two, and Davy sixty-three. In Sloane MS. 3899 (fourteenth century) there are twenty-four short treatises by Lavenham on logical subjects ('De Propositionibus,' 'De Terminis,' &c.). Other extant works ascribed to Lavenham are:

- 'In Revelationes S. Brigittæ Lib. vii.' in MS. Reg. 7, C. ix, in the British Library, a folio volume of the fifteenth century; the fourth book is also in Bodl. MS. 169 in the Bodleian Library. De Villiers describes this work as 'Determinationes notabiles Oxonii et Londini lectæ'
- 'Contra Johannem Purveium,' heresies extracted from Purvey's 'Ecclesiæ Regimen,' printed in 'Fasciculi Zizaniorum,' pp. 383–99.
- 'Super Prædicamentis,' in Digby MS. 77, f. 191 b, mutilated at the end, inc. 'Tractaturus de Decem Generibus.'
- 'Speculum Naturale sive super viii. lib. Physicorum;' a copy, which was formerly in the Carmelite Library at Oxford, went to Gonville and Caius College, Cambridge where it was styled 'Commentarius super viii. libros Aristotelis Physicorum, qui dicitur supplementum Lavenham.' Thomas Tanner ascribed this work both to Richard and to a Thomas Lavenham, who was in 1447 one of the first fellows of All Souls' College.
- 'De Septem Peccatis Mortalibus,' an English treatise beginning 'Crist yt deyde upon ye crosse.' In Harleian MS. 211, ff. 35 a–46 b, an early fifteenth-century manuscript, with a contemporary ascription to Lavenham.
- 'De Gestis et Translationibus sanctorum trium regum de Colonia,' ascribed to Lavenham by a late hand in Laud. MS. Misc. 525 in the Bodleian. This is in fact a once famous work by John of Hildesheim (fl. 1370), a German Carmelite; but there were several English translations, and Lavenham may have been the author of one of these. The Latin and two English versions were edited by C. Horstmann for the Early English Text Society in 1886.

Among the other treatises given by De Villiers are 'Abbreviationes Bedæ' (it has been suggested that this is the abbreviation printed by Abraham Wheloc in his edition of Bede), 'Compendium Gualteri Reclusi' (perhaps Walter Hilton), 'De Fundatione sui Ordinis,' a treatise called 'Clypeus Paupertatis' (suggesting Lavenham had taken part in the controversy concerning evangelical poverty), a commentary on Aristotle's 'Ethics,' tracts on physics and astronomy ('De Cœlo et Mundo,' 'De Proprietatibus Elementorum'), together with 'Quæstiones,' sermons, and similar works.
