= Bo District =

- Coordinates: 8°00′N 11°40′W
- Country: Sierra Leone
- Province: Southern Province
- Capital: Bo
- Largest city: Bo

Government
  - Type: District Council
  - Council Chairman: Joseph Munda Bindi (SLPP)

Area
  - Total: 5,219 km^{2} (2,015 sq mi)

Population (2021 census)
  - Total: 756,975
  - Rank: 2nd
  - Density: 145.0/km^{2} (375.7/sq mi)
- Time zone: UTC-5 (Greenwich Mean Time)
- HDI (2017): 0.424 low · 4th

Bo District is a district in the Southern Province of Sierra Leone. It is one of the sixteen districts of Sierra Leone. Bo District is the second most populous district in Sierra Leone. Its capital and largest city is the city of Bo, which is also the second most populous city in Sierra Leone. Other major towns in the district include Baoma, Bumpeh, Serabu, Sumbuya, Baiima and Yele.

Bo District borders Kenema District to the east, Tonkolili District to the north, Moyamba District to the west, Bonthe District to the southwest and Pujehun District to the south. The district population as of 2015 is 574,201. Bo District occupies a total area of 5,219 km^{2} and is subdivided into fifteen chiefdoms.

The population of Bo District is mainly from the Mende ethnic group, though the city of Bo has a very ethnic diverse population.

== Government ==
Bo District has its own directly elected local government called the District Council, and is where the executive and legislative authority is vested at the local level within Bo District. The Bo District Council is headed by a council chairman, who is an elected official and is responsible for the general management of the district. The current council chairman of Bo District is Joseph Munda Bindi of the Sierra Leone People's Party (SLPP), following his election victory in the 2018 Sierra Leone local election.

The city of Bo also has its own directly elected city council headed by a mayor. The current mayor of Bo is Kobba Musa; he is a member of the opposition Sierra Leone People's Party (SLPP). Bo District is a stronghold of the ruling Sierra Leone People's Party.

=== Members of Parliament of Sierra Leone from Bo District ===
Bo District currently has twelve representatives in the Parliament of Sierra Leone, of which eleven members were elected for a 5-year term in the 2007 general elections. The district is a stronghold of the opposition Sierra Leone People's Party (SLPP). The following is a list of Bo District's representatives and affiliations:

Name	Party
Eric B. Jumu	SLPP
Elizabeth Alpha-Lavalie	SLPP
Nenneh Lebbie	SLPP
Joseph Mustapha	SLPP
Jusufu Mansaray	SLPP
Frank Kposowa	SLPP
Francis Rogers	PMDC
Paul Kamara	PMDC
Youkie Foday	SLPP
Legacy Sankoh	PMDC
P.C. Hindowa Bindi Samba	Non

== Demographics ==
=== Ethnicity ===
The population of Bo District is ethnically and culturally diverse, particularly in the city of Bo, Sierra Leone's second largest city. The Mende people form the largest ethnic group in Bo District at over 60 percent of the population.

=== Religion ===
Religion in Bo District (2015)
Religion	Percent(%)
Islam	72.1%
Christianity	26.9%
Baháʼí	0.0%
Traditional African Religion	0.0%
Other	0.7%
No Religion	0.2%

== Economy ==
With Bo being the second largest city in Sierra Leone, trading, gold and diamond mining are major economic activities for the district; as well as agricultural production of rice growing, and coffee, cacao and oil palm.

== Education ==
Bo District is home to 385 Primary Schools and 40 Secondary Schools. Bo Government Secondary School, commonly called Bo School is among the 40 secondary schools in Bo District. The school was founded in 1906 by Leslie Probyn to educate the children of Bo District. The school has a long history of developing the elite of Sierra Leone, especially the country's politicians.

== Recovery after Civil War ==
Bo District suffered badly at the hands of rebel forces during 1994–1995, and many major towns were almost entirely destroyed (Tikonko and Bumpe, for example). However, since the ousting of the Junta in early 1998, Bo District has remained secure, due mainly to the strong presence of the Civil Defence Forces. As such, rather than suffering from displacement, Bo District has been the recipient of displaced persons from less secure parts of the country.

Although aid agencies have had uninterrupted access to the district for five years because of its relative stability, most of the recovery efforts were concentrated in Bo Town leaving out the 8 sections in Kakua chiefdom as well as all the other 14 chiefdoms in the district.

The major recovery needs according to sectoral priorities are as follows: road rehabilitation, education, water and sanitation, health, agriculture, restoration of local government structures, and shelter.

== Administrative divisions ==
=== Chiefdoms ===
==== Pre-2017 ====
Prior to the 2017 local administrative reorganization, Bo District was made up of fifteen chiefdoms as the third level of administrative subdivision.

1. Badjia – Ngelehun
2. Bagbo – Jimmi
3. Bagbwe – Ngarlu
4. Baoma – Baoma
5. Bumpe–Gao – Bumpe
6. Gbo – Gbo
7. Jaiama Bongor – Telu
8. Kakua – Kakua
9. Komboya – Njala
10. Lugbu – Sumbuya
11. Niawa Lenga – Nengbema
12. Selenga – Dambala
13. Tikonko – Tikonko
14. Valunia – Mongere
15. Wonde – Gboyama

==== Post-2017 ====
After the 2017 local administrative reorganization, Bo District has made up of seventeen chiefdoms as the third level of administrative subdivision.

1. Badjia – Ngelehun
2. Bagbo – Jimmi
3. Bagbwe – Ngarlu
4. Baoma – Baoma
5. Bongor (Note: Formerly part of Jaiama Bongor Chiefdom; split off.) – Telu
6. Bumpe–Gao – Bumpe
7. Gbo – Gbo
8. Jaiama – ?
9. Kakua – Kakua
10. Komboya – Njala
11. Lugbu – Sumbuya
12. Niawa Lenga – Nengbema
13. Selenga – Dambala
14. Tikonko – Tikonko
15. Valunia – Mongere
16. Wonde – Gboyama
17. Bo City (Note: Formerly part of Kakua Chiefdom.) – Bo

=== Major towns ===
- Bo, capital and largest city
- Boama
- Serabu
- Bumpe
- Mongeri, second largest town
- Sumbuya
- Baiima
- Tikonko
- Gondama

=== Towns and villages ===
- Bambima
- Bandeh
- Bumbe
- Koribondo
- Mamboma
- Mange
- Momboma
- Sembehun
- Telu
- Tokoronko
- Jimmi Bagbo
- Mondorkor
- Gandohun -Tikonko
- Gondama

== Notable people from Bo District ==
- Joe Robert Pemagbi, Sierra Leone ambassador to the UN
- Aluspah Brewah, football star
- Hinga Norman, politician
- Joseph Henry Ganda, archbishop

== See also ==
- Sierra Leone
- Sierra Leone Civil War
- Albert Joe Demby, former Vice President of Sierra Leone
- Victor Bockarie Foh, former Vice President of Sierra Leone
