= Joseph Mustapha =

Sierra Leonean politician and lawyer

Joseph Mustapha is a Sierra Leonean politician and lawyer. He is a member of the Sierra Leone People's Party and is one of the representatives in the Parliament of Sierra Leone for Bo District, elected in 2007.

Mustapha is a member of the Parliamentary Commission for Mineral Resources.
