= Apotheosis (film) =

1970 film

- Directed by: John Lennon; Yoko Ono
- Release date: 1970
- Running time: 17 minutes
- Country: United Kingdom
- Language: English

Apotheosis is a 1970 film directed by John Lennon and Yoko Ono.

== Plot ==
The film depicts a 17-minute-long journey on a balloon as it ascends and finally rises into the clouds. Lennon and Ono appear at the start of the film dressed in dark cloaks and hoods.

== Production ==
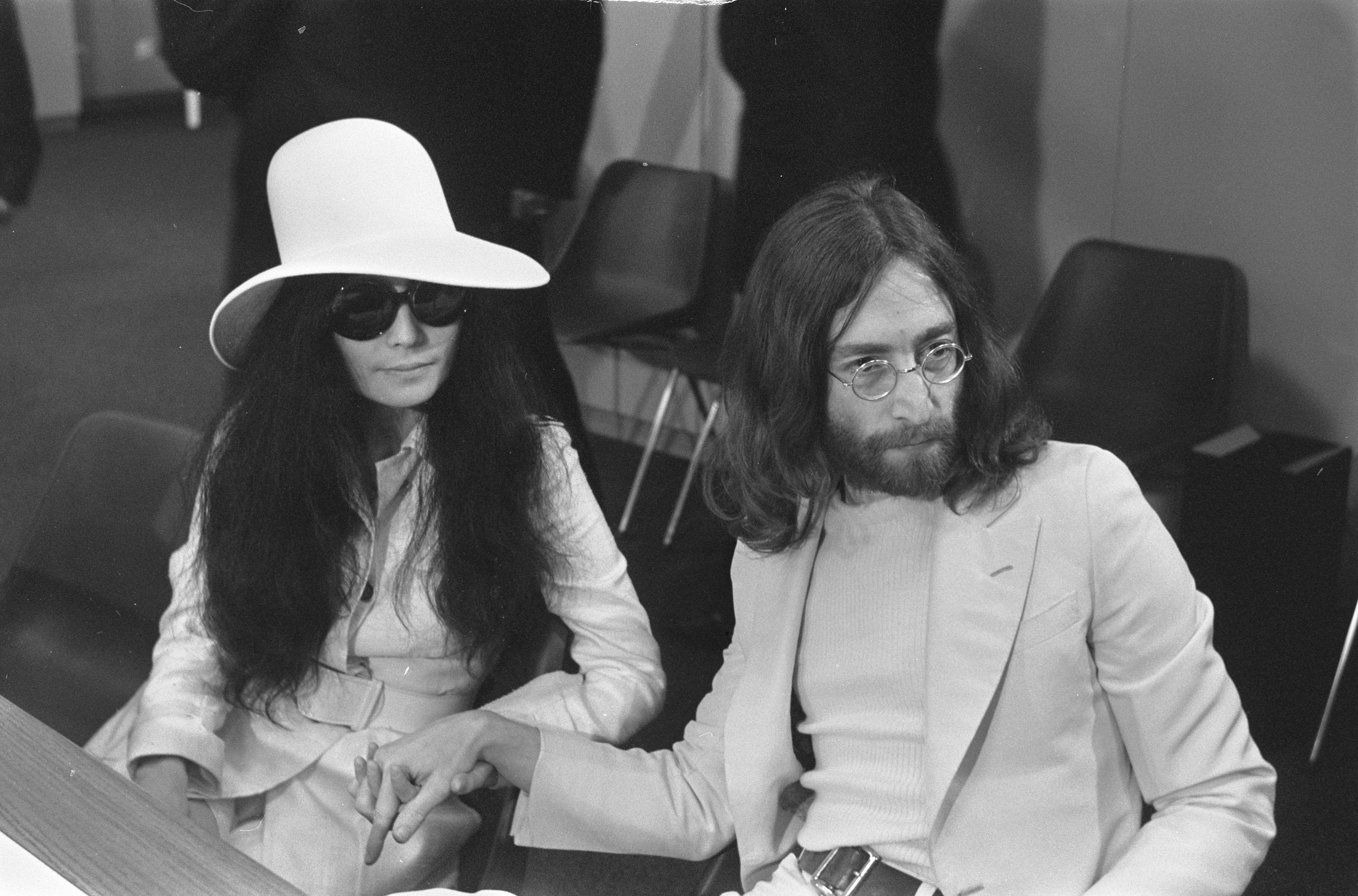
The film's directors Yoko Ono and John Lennon in 1969

The film was shot in the village of Lavenham in Suffolk in eastern England; the couple had decided to reject footage from an earlier filming attempt in the Hampshire town of Basingstoke. Lennon and Ono arrived at Lavenham's Market Place in their white Rolls-Royce driven by a chauffeur and booked into the nearby Bull Hotel in Long Melford as 'Mr and Mrs Smith'. The couple were accompanied by a film crew who were shooting a documentary for the BBC, The World of John and Yoko, which was broadcast over the Christmas period of 1969.

A local building company, W A Deacon & Sons, erected scaffolding to secure the balloon before release. The workers also helped lift Lennon and Ono into and out of the basket. A photograph of Lennon and Ono in the balloon was on the front cover of the East Anglian Daily Times on the following Monday. The couple left the basket shortly before the launch of the balloon, causing members of the public who had gathered to heckle them.

Nic Kowland, a frequent technical collaborator on films made by Ono, helped with the technical aspects of the film. The idea for the film came from discussions the couple had had while making their album cover for Two Virgins while nude.

The 22,000 cubic metres (780,000 cu ft) of gas that filled the balloon cost £350, and permission for the flight was granted by the Ministry of Defence and Lavenham Parish Council. The parish council had been contacted by the Beatles' company Apple Corps two days prior to the shoot to ask permission to shoot the film. In a 2010 interview Ono said that making the film in Lavenham was "truly lovely" and that she would "love to go back there ... but it's not the same for me without John". The couple had previously directed the films Rape and Fly and subsequently collaborated on Up Your Legs Forever.

The film was also show at the Whitney Museum of Art in New York as part of a Yoko Ono film retrospective in March 1989.

== Reception ==
In 1972 the critic Jonas Mekas described the point at which the camera rose above the clouds as: "suddenly the cloud landscape opened up like a huge poem, you could see the tops of the clouds, all beautifully enveloped by sun, stretching into infinity..."
