= Tikonko =

- Location in Sierra Leone
- Coordinates: 7°52′49″N 11°46′55″W
- Country: Sierra Leone
- Province: Southern Province
- District: Bo District
- Chiefdom: Tikonko Chiefdom
- Time zone: UTC-5 (GMT)

Tikonko is a village in Bo District in the Southern Province of Sierra Leone. The Mende make up the largest ethnic group in the village.
