= Jimmi, Sierra Leone =

Jimmi
- Location in Sierra Leone
- Coordinates: 7°36′37″N 11°48′58″W
- Country: Sierra Leone
- Province: Southern Province
- District: Bo District
- Chiefdom: Bagbo Chiefdom
- Time zone: UTC-5 (GMT)

Jimmi is a village in Bo District in the Southern Province of Sierra Leone. It lies along the Mapandi River.
