= Lavenham =

Village in Suffolk, England

Coordinates: 52.1076°N 0.79544°E

- Village and civil parish
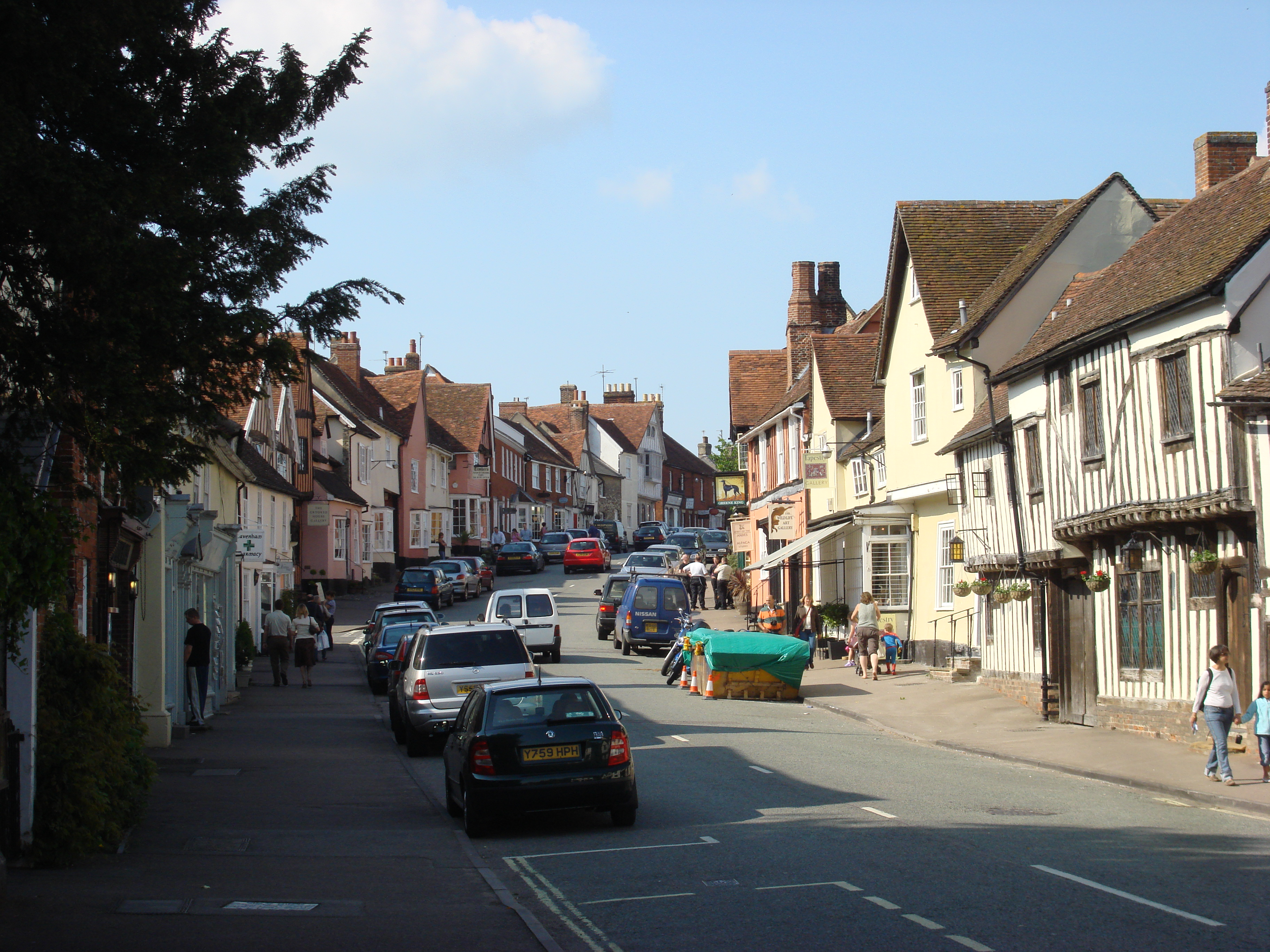
- High Street, Lavenham

- Location within Suffolk
- Population: 1,722 (2011)
- OS grid reference: TL915491
  - London: 76.3 miles
- Civil parish: Lavenham
- District: Babergh
- Shire county: Suffolk
- Region: East
- Country: England
- Sovereign state: United Kingdom
- Post town: SUDBURY
- Postcode district: CO10
- Dialling code: 01787
- Police: Suffolk
- Fire: Suffolk
- Ambulance: East of England
- UK Parliament: South Suffolk

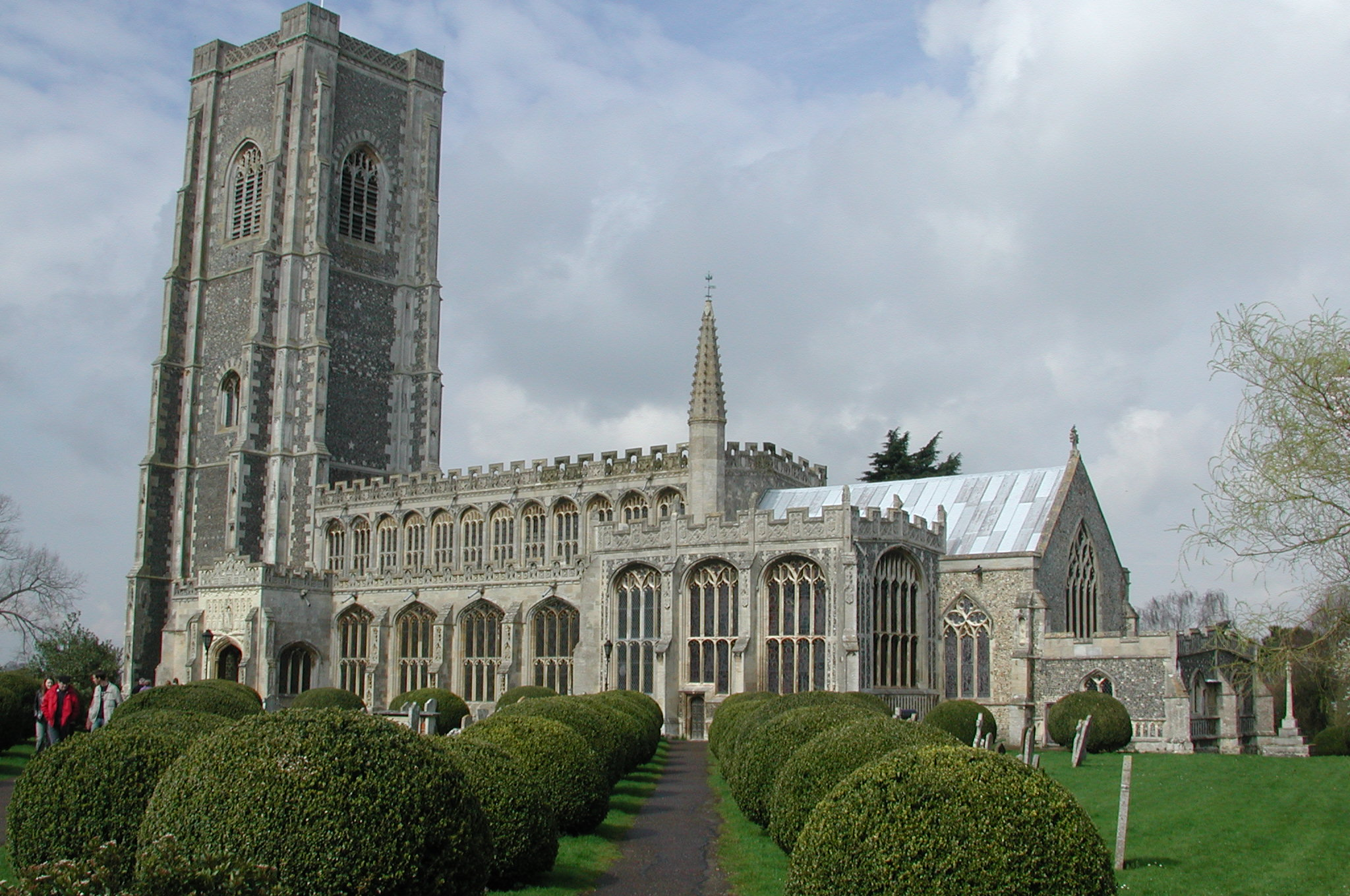
The church of St. Peter and St. Paul, Lavenham

Lavenham (/ˈlævənəm/) is a village, civil parish and electoral ward in the Babergh district, in the county of Suffolk, England. It is noted for its Guildhall, Little Hall, 15th-century church, half-timbered medieval cottages and circular walks. In the medieval period it was among the twenty wealthiest settlements in England. In 2011 the parish had a population of 1722.

== History ==
Before the Norman Conquest of England, the manor of Lavenham had been held by the thegn Ulwin or Wulwine. In 1086 the estate was in the possession of Aubrey de Vere I, ancestor of the Earls of Oxford. He had already had a vineyard planted there. The Vere family continued to hold the estate until 1604, when it was sold to Sir Thomas Skinner.

Lavenham prospered from the wool trade in the 15th and 16th centuries, with its blue broadcloth being an export of note. By the late 15th century, the village was among the richest in the British Isles, paying more in taxation than considerably large towns such as York and Lincoln. Several merchant families emerged, the most successful of which was the Spring family.

The village’s prosperity at this time can be seen in the lavishly constructed wool church of St Peter and St Paul, which stands on a hill at the top end of the high street. The church, completed in 1525, is excessively large for the size of the village and with a tower standing 138 feet (42 m) high it lays claim to being the highest village church tower in Britain. Other buildings also demonstrate the village’s medieval wealth. Lavenham Wool Hall was completed in 1464.

The Guildhall of the catholic guild of Corpus Christi was built in 1529 and stands in the centre of the village overlooking the market square. When visiting in 1487 Henry VII fined several Lavenham families for displaying too much wealth. However during the 16th century Lavenham's industry was badly affected by Dutch refugees settled in Colchester, who produced cloth that was cheaper and lighter than Lavenham's and also more fashionable. Cheaper cloth from Europe also aided the settlement's decline, and by 1600 it had lost its reputation as a major trading town. This sudden and dramatic change to the village’s fortune is the principal reason for so many medieval and Tudor buildings remaining unmodified, since subsequent generations of citizens did not have the wealth required to rebuild in the latest styles.

The Little Hall is a late 14th-century hall house on the main square. Built in the 1390s as a family house and workplace, it was enlarged and modernised in the mid-1550s and greatly extended later. By the 1700s it was home to six families. It was restored in the 1920s/30s by Robert Grenville Gayer-Anderson and his identical-twin brother Thomas. In the 1960s and 70s it was an outpost of Kingston (Surrey) College of Art. In 1975 Surrey County Council offered it to the Suffolk Building Preservation Trust, who restored it. It now contains the Gayer-Anderson collection of pictures and artefacts, including a copy of the Gayer-Anderson cat, and operates as a museum.

During the reign of Henry VIII Lavenham was the scene of serious resistance to Wolsey's 'Amicable Grant', a tax being raised in England to pay for war with France. However this was happening without the consent of parliament. In 1525 10,000 men from Lavenham and the surrounding villages took part in the Lavenham Revolt, a serious uprising that threatened to spread to the nearby counties of Essex and Cambridgeshire. However the revolt was suppressed for the King by the Dukes of Norfolk and Suffolk, with the aid of local families. Elizabeth I visited the village during a Royal Progress of East Anglia in 1578.

Like most of East Anglia, Lavenham was staunchly Parliamentarian throughout the Civil Wars of the 1640s. Most local landowners, such as Sir Nathaniel Barnardiston, Sir Philip Parker and Sir William Spring, were strong advocates of the Parliamentarian cause. There is no record of the village ever being involved in the conflict direct, although the inhabitants did provide a troop of soldiers to aid in Parliament's Siege of Colchester in 1648. A grammar school opened in the village in 1647. The settlement was struck by plague in 1666 and 1699. Small pox struck in 1712 and 1713, killing more than one in six of Lavenham's residents.

In the late 18th century the village was home to poet Jane Taylor, and it may have been while living in Shilling Street that she wrote the poem The Star, from which the lyrics for the nursery rhyme Twinkle Twinkle Little Star are taken. Colchester and Ongar, both in Essex, also have claims to be the site of composition of the poem.

Like many East Anglian settlements, Lavenham was home to an airfield in the Second World War II – Air Force Station Lavenham, an American Air Force airfield. USAAF Station 137 was manned by the US Army Air Force 487th Bombardment Group between 1944 and 1945. The airfield, actually located a few miles away in Alpheton, has since been returned to arable farmland, though some evidence of its structures and buildings remains, including the control tower.

In the 1960s a new area of council housing was built in the north of the village, centred on Spring Street, Spring Close and Spring Lane. In 1980 the marijuana smuggler Howard Marks was arrested in the bar of the Swan Hotel.

John Lennon and Yoko Ono filmed their experimental film Apotheosis with a hot-air balloon in Lavenham's Market Place in December 1969.

== Geography ==
The village is around five miles northeast of the town of Sudbury. Situated in a relatively hilly area, Lavenham is on a ridge on the western bank of the River Brett. The ridge is intersected by two small valleys, breaking it into three parts; the church is located atop the southernmost section, the marketplace on the central part, and the northernmost section is topped by the remains of a windmill.

The southernmost valley contains a brook running between the pond at Lavenham Hall and the River Brett, though it was covered by a culvert 500 years ago and Water Street built over the top. There have been attempts to give the culverts Scheduled Monument status as a "rare early example of municipal plumbing". The northernmost valley also contains a small stream as well as being the former route of the abandoned railway line.

== Transport ==
Lavenham is on the A1141, the main road between Hadleigh and Bury St Edmunds. HGV traffic has been an issue for the village's narrow streets.

The village formerly had a railway station on the Long Melford–Bury St Edmunds branch line, which was opened on 9 August 1865. There were plans for the Hadleigh branch line to be extended to Lavenham but they never came to fruition. The line was an important goods route during the Second World War and was guarded by numerous Type 22 pillboxes, most of which are still visible in the surrounding farmland. The railway station was closed to passengers on 10 April 1961, with a goods service surviving until April 1965. Today the disused line is used as a public footpath and is a designated nature reserve.

== Education ==
The village is served by Lavenham Community Primary School, which currently caters for pupils aged 5–11. The school feeds into Thomas Gainsborough School.

== Demography ==
=== Historical population ===
Historical population of Lavenham

Year	Pop.	±%
1801	1,776	—
1811	1,711	−3.7%
1821	1,898	+10.9%
1831	2,107	+11.0%
1841	1,871	−11.2%

Year	Pop.	±%
1851	1,811	−3.2%
1861	1,823	+0.7%
1871	1,886	+3.5%
1881	1,838	−2.5%
1891	1,908	+3.8%

Year	Pop.	±%
1901	2,018	+5.8%
1911	1,963	−2.7%
1921	1,620	−17.5%
1931	1,451	−10.4%
1951	1,489	+2.6%

Year	Pop.	±%
1961	1,305	−12.4%
1971	1,480	+13.4%
1981		—
1991		—
2001	1,750	—

Source: Census: Regional District 1801–1971

=== Notable residents ===
- Richard of Lavenham (fl. 1380), an English Carmelite, known as a scholastic philosopher
- Thomas Cooke (unknown, but in Lavenham – 1478), an English merchant and Lord Mayor of London
- Thomas Spring of Lavenham (c. 1474 – 1523), an English cloth merchant, buried in Lavenham
- John Spring of Lavenham (unknown – 1547), an English merchant and politician
- Thomas Spring of Castlemaine (unknown, but in Lavenham – 1597), an English Protestant soldier and landowner
- William Spring of Lavenham (unknown – 1599), an English politician and landowner.
- George Ruggle (1575–1622), author of Ignoramus, a college farce; brought up in Lavenham
- William Gurnall (1616–1679), puritan rector of Lavenham church (1644–1679), author of The Christian in Complete Armour
- Peregrine Branwhite (1745 in Lavenham – c. 1795), an English poet
- Isaac Taylor (1759–1829), an English engraver and writer of books for the young, lived in Lavenham
- William Blair (1766 in Lavenham – 1822), an English surgeon, interested in ciphers and stenography
- Jane Taylor (1783–1824), an English poet and novelist, wrote the words to the song Twinkle, Twinkle, Little Star, lived in Lavenham
- Sir William Shelford KCMG (1834 in Lavenham – 1905), an English civil engineer
- Robert Langton Douglas (1864 in Lavenham – 1951), a British art critic, lecturer and author
- Katherine Dempsey (1865 in Lavenham – 1923), a British mathematician
- Robert Grenville Gayer-Anderson (1881–1945), surgeon, soldier, colonial officer and collector of antiquities, lived in the Little Hall, Lavenham.
- Sir Francis Meynell (1891–1975), a British poet and printer at The Nonesuch Press, lived in Lavenham.
- Dame Alix Kilroy (1903–1999), civil and public servant, lived in Lavenham.
- John Millar Watt (1895–1975), artist, illustrator and comics artist: creator of 'Pop' cartoon (1921–1949), lived in Lavenham.
- Sir Stephen Spender CBE (1909–1995), an English poet, novelist and essayist
- Sir Clive Rose GCMG (1921–2019), a British diplomat, retired to Lavenham
- Roy Turner Durrant (1925 in Lavenham – 1998), an English abstract artist
- Eamon Boland (born 1947), an English actor

== Lavenham in popular culture ==
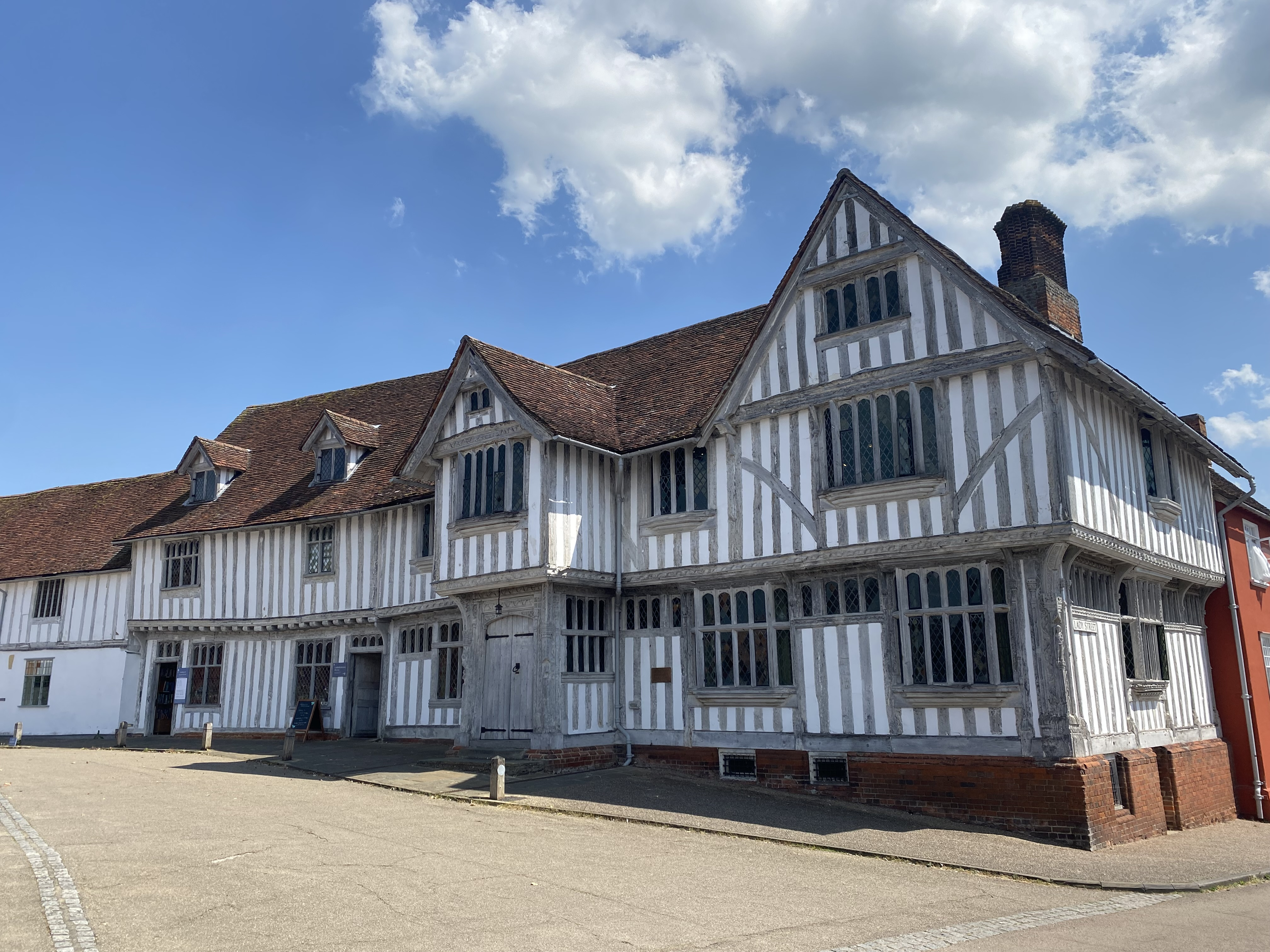
Lavenham Guildhall was established in 1529

Parts of Market Square were included in the 1968 Vincent Price film Witchfinder General. The witch-burning scenes were staged in front of the Guildhall.

In 1969 some filming was done in Lavenham for The Thirteen Chairs, also known as Twelve Plus One. This was actress Sharon Tate's last movie before her murder. In 1971 part of Pier Paolo Pasolini’s film The Canterbury Tales was recorded here, with the village representing medieval London.

The 1975 Stanley Kubrick film Barry Lyndon included the Guildhall.

In 1980 some sequences in a TV advertisement for the launch of the new Austin Metro were filmed in the village, primarily on the market square, as well as in neighbouring Kersey.

In 1986 the film Playing Away, about a visiting cricket team from Brixton, was also filmed in the village. The Market Square is the setting of John Lennon and Yoko Ono's 1970 film Apotheosis. In 2010, under conditions of strict secrecy, scenes from Harry Potter and the Deathly Hallows – Part 1 were filmed there. The village's De Vere House represented sections of Godric's Hollow, as backgrounds, since the cast members did not actually visit Lavenham.

Lavenham was also the setting for many scenes in the mid-1990s BBC TV drama Lovejoy. An episode broadcast in December 1994 had the title Last Tango in Lavenham.

Other productions that have used Lavenham as a location include Lowland Village, a 1943 British Council release, and an episode of Treasure Hunt from February 1988.

One legend suggests that thecrooked appearance of many of the town's buildings inspired the poem There Was a Crooked Man. One discussion of the village provides these specifics as to the reason the houses are crooked.

The village grew so fast that many of the houses were built in haste with green timber. As the wood dried the timbers warped causing the houses to bend at unexpected angles. Unfortunately Lavenham's good times didn't last long. When Dutch refugees settled in Colchester began producing cloth that was cheaper, lighter and more fashionable than Lavenham's, the town's cloth industry went bust. By the time the dried timber started twisting, Lavenham's families had lost their wealth and with no money to rebuild their homes Lavenham's crooked houses were left as they were.

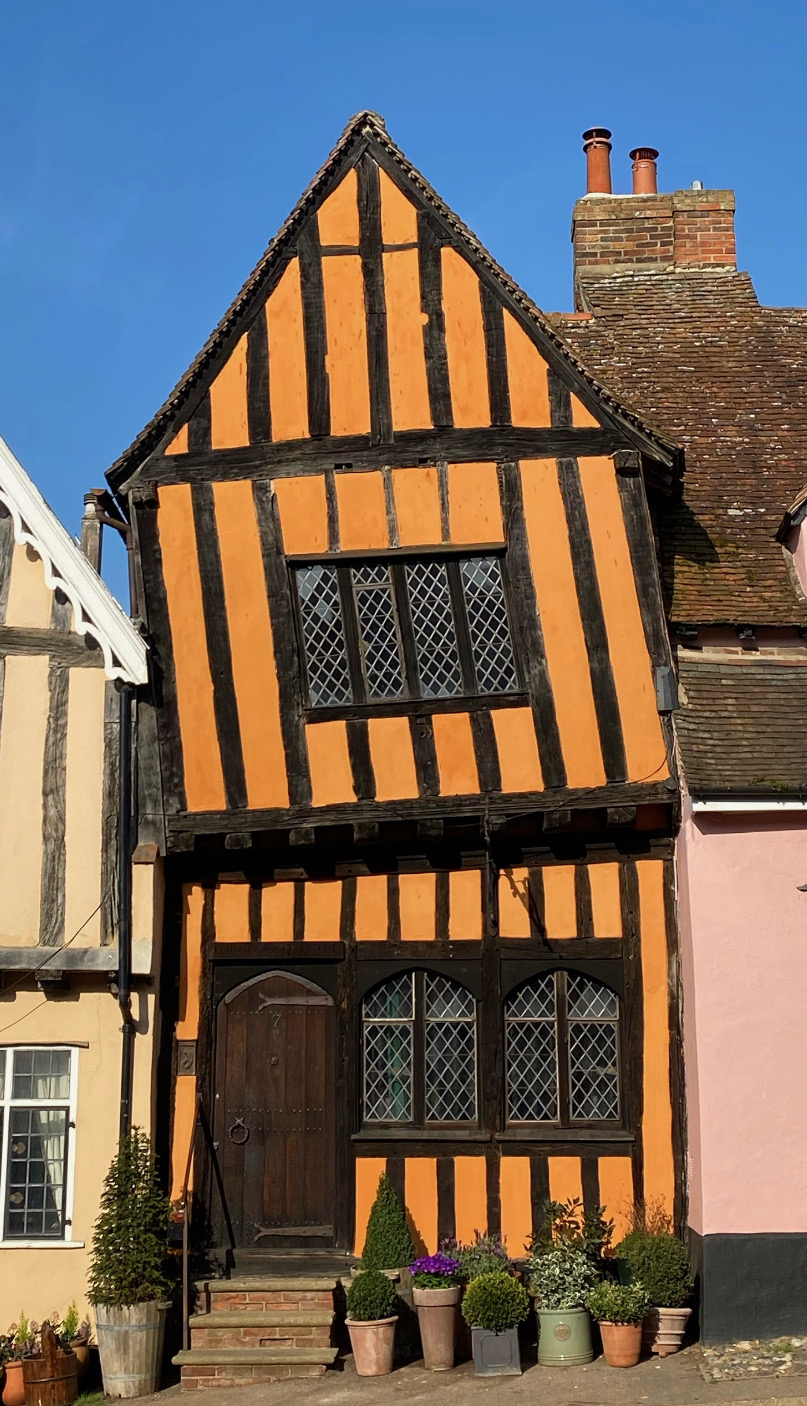
The Crooked House, Lavenham

The best-known crooked house is 'The Crooked House' at 7 High Street. Thought to be the inspiration for the old English nursery rhyme There Was a Crooked Man, The Crooked House was built in 1395 as part of a medieval Hall House. It has been Grade II listed since 1958 as part of 7–9 High Street. The listing description indicates that 7–9 High Street was divided into two tenements before 1958, and that the orange building (originally the south cross wing) was "very much altered in the C18 and C19" and was "restored with the timber-framing exposed". In 2005 and for some time after, the building was an art gallery. The property operated as a tearoom from 2013 to 2020. In 2021 it was bought and restored by Alex and Oli Khalil-Martin and 'the Crooked Men' now host experiences and events. In 2022, Country Life described The Crooked House as "one of the world's most photographed homes" and "the world's most famous crooked house".

In 2026 The Daily Telegraph wrote that Lavenham was the prettiest village in England.

== Gallery ==
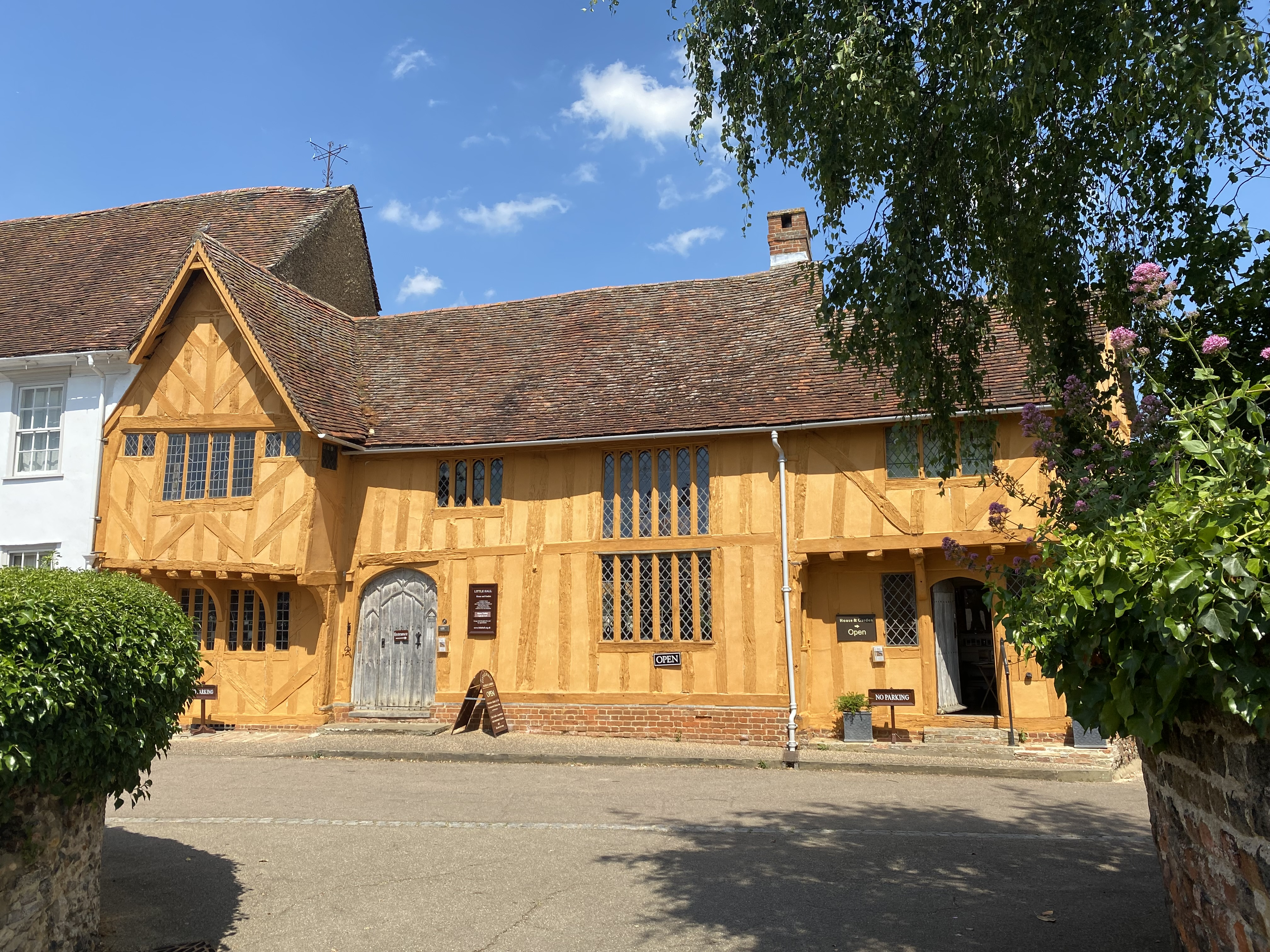
Little Hall, Lavenham

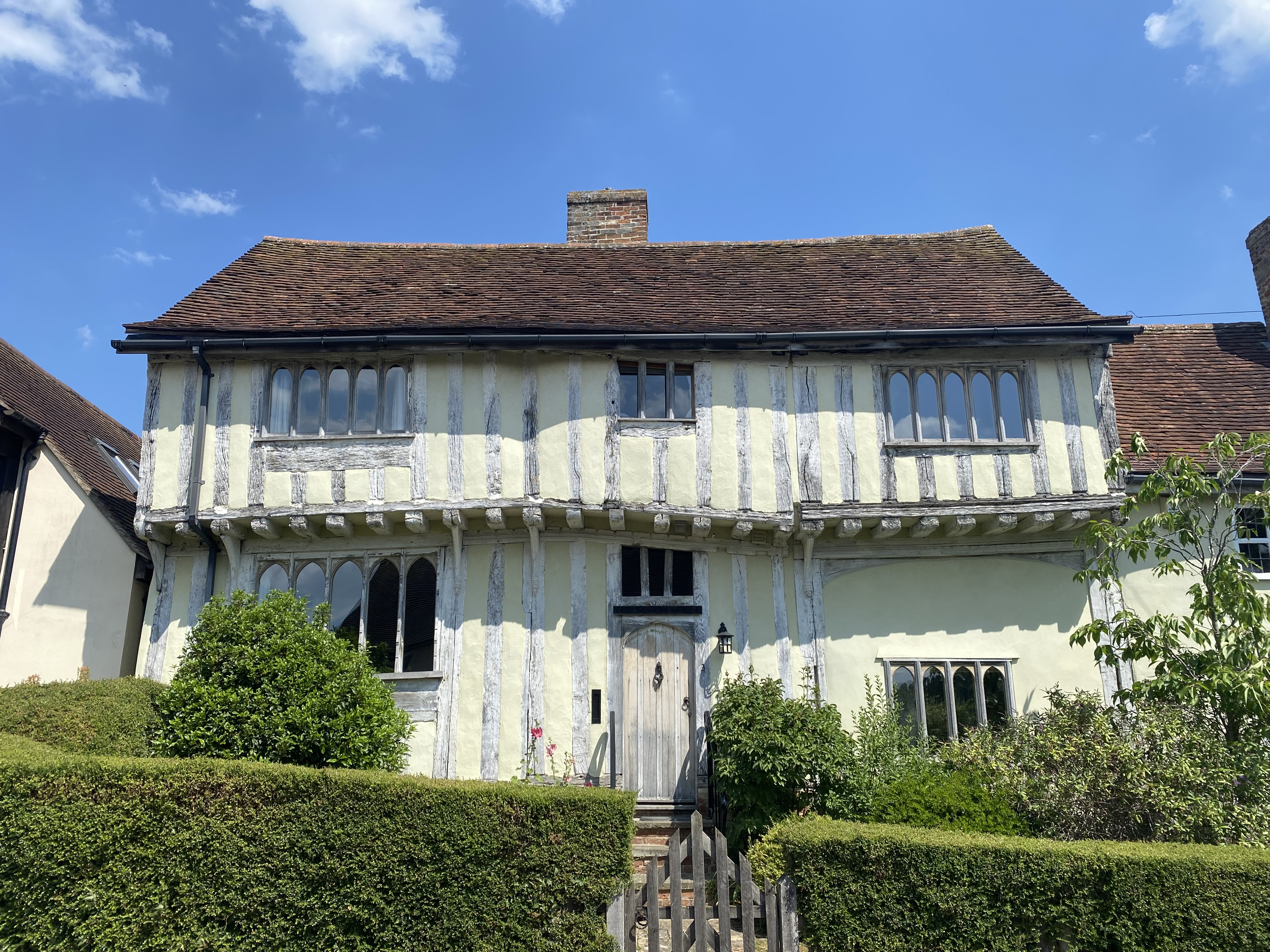
Medieval house on Lady Street, Lavenham

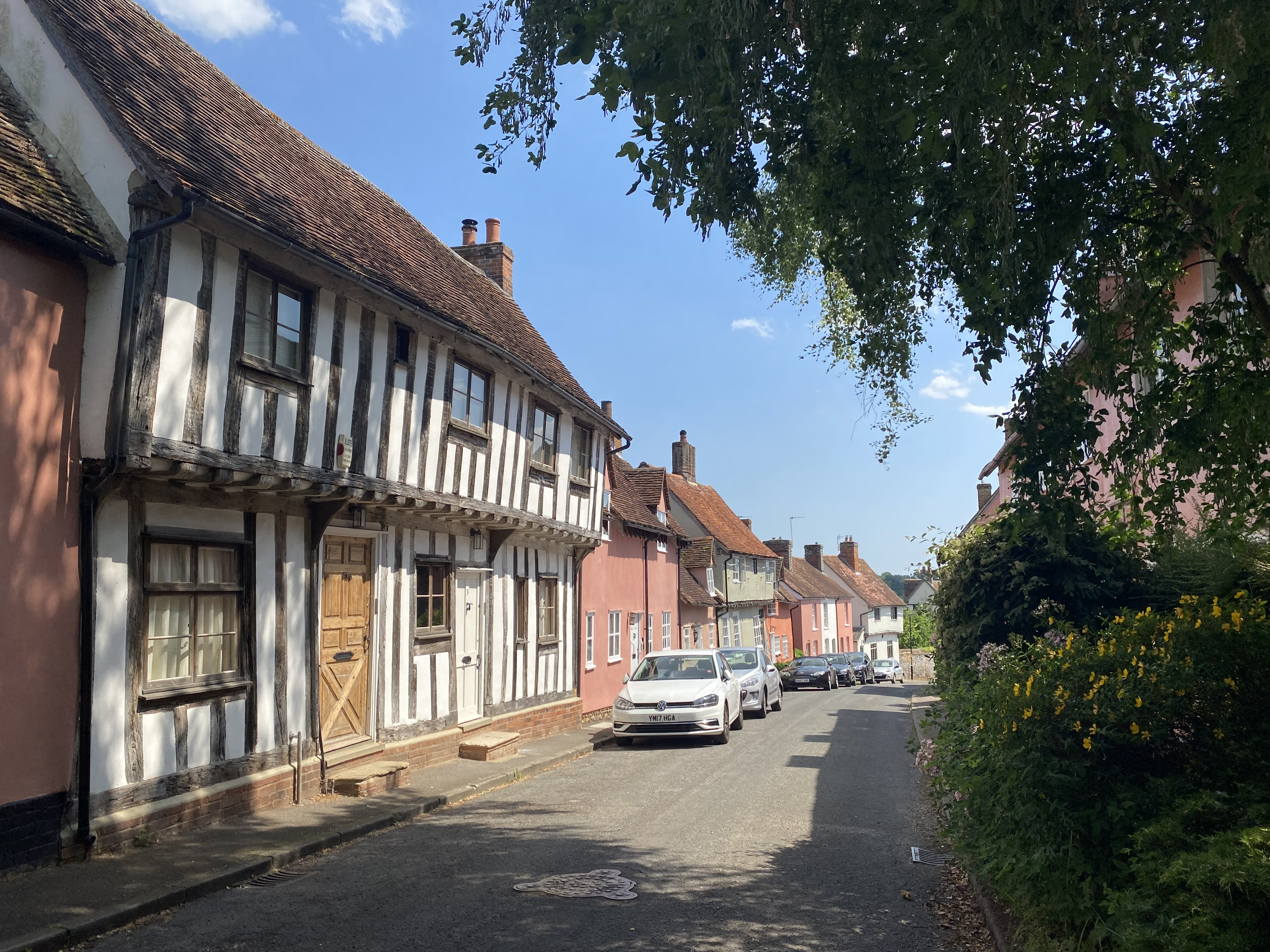
Shilling Street, Lavenham

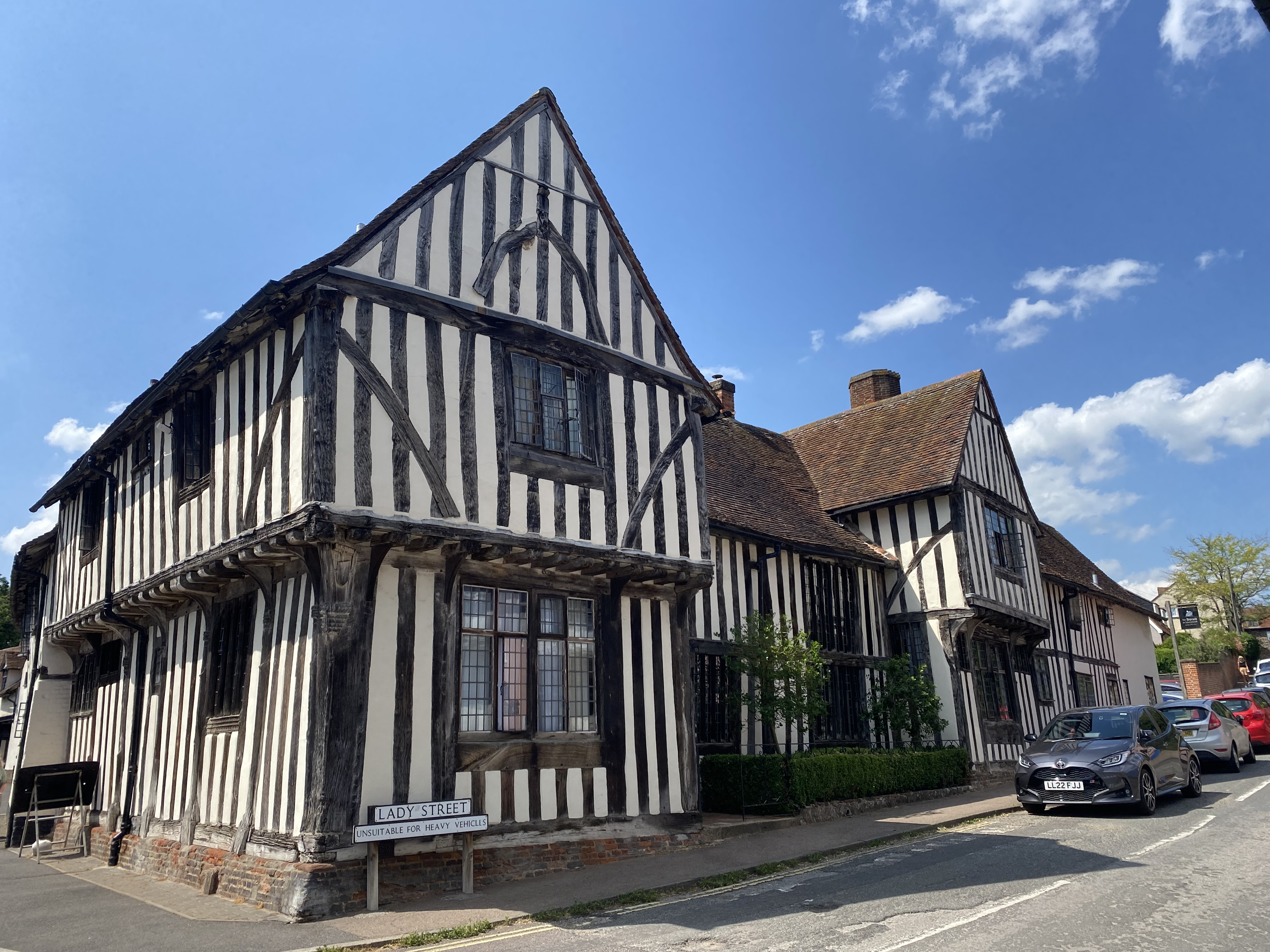
Lavenham Wool Hall, built in 1464

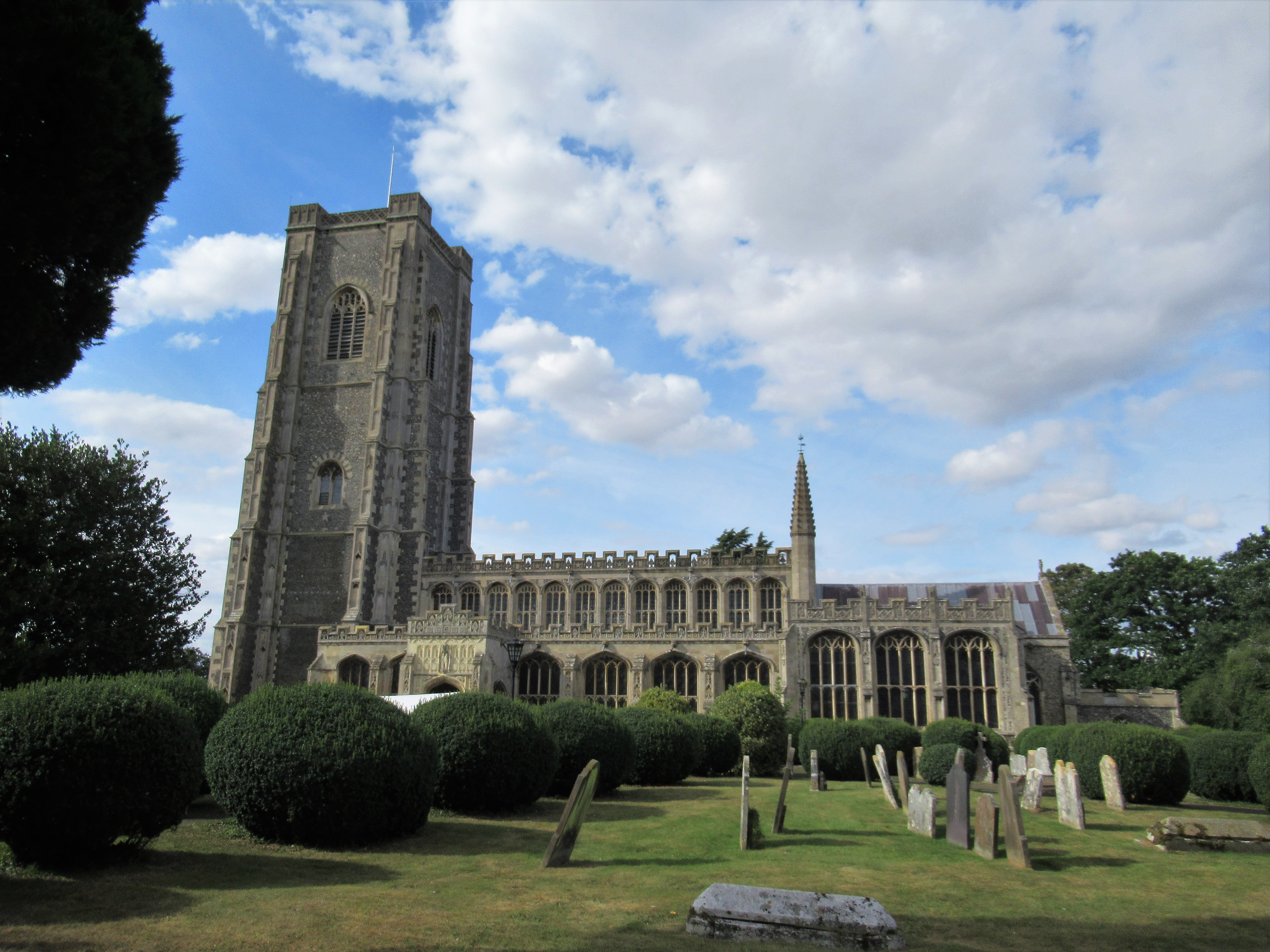
St Peter and St Paul's Church, Lavenham
