= Nenneh Lebbie =

Sierra Leonean politician

Nenneh Lebbie is a Sierra Leonean politician. She is a member of the Sierra Leone People's Party and is one of the representatives in the Parliament of Sierra Leone for Bo District, elected in 2007.
