= Bumpe–Gao Chiefdom =

- Chiefdom
- Interactive map of Bumpe–Gao Chiefdom
- Country: Sierra Leone
- Province: Southern Province
- District: Bo District
- Capital: Bumpe
- Time zone: UTC+0 (GMT)

Bumpe–Gao Chiefdom, also known as Bumpeh ngawo or Bumpe ngao, is a chiefdom in Bo District of Sierra Leone. Its capital is Bumpe.

== Climate ==
The climate is that of a Monsoon. The average temperature is 22 °C. The hottest month is April, at 24 °C, and the coldest is July, at 20 °C. The average rainfall is 2,971 millimeters per year. The wettest month is September, with 543 millimeters of rain, and the driest is January, with 8 millimeters.

Bumpe Ngawo Chiefdom

Climate chart (precipitation, max. and min. temperature)
J	F	M	A	M	J	J	A	S	O	N	D
8 25 19	28 27 19	30 27 21	75 28 21	335 26 20	328 26 19	449 23 17	475 22 19	543 23 18	406 24 18	268 24 21	27 25 20
- █ Average max. and min. temperatures in °C
- █ Precipitation totals in mm
Imperial conversion
J	F	M	A	M	J	J	A	S	O	N	D
0.3 77 66	1.1 81 66	1.2 81 70	3 82 70	13 79 68	13 79 66	18 73 63	19 72 66	21 73 64	16 75 64	11 75 70	1.1 77 68
- █ Average max. and min. temperatures in °F
- █ Precipitation totals in inches

== Ethnic makeup and culture ==
This chiefdom is inhabited by different ethnic groups, which are the Temnes, Mendes and the Sherbros. Residents trace their origin to a warrior named Bandabla Jei, a successful hunter and fisherman, who came from the east with a hunting party and established himself as a local leader. Jei later left as other stronger invaders won against him and took over the chiefdom. He is said to have left in a canoe down the river.

== Ruling families ==
The chiefdom is ruled by five recognized ruling families.

=== Gbekpa/Barka ===
This house traces the lineage of Barka, one of the many sons of Gbekpa.All other houses trace their legitimacy to connections with this house. Its headquarters is at Bumpe.

=== Kposowa family ===
The great-grandfather of the Kposowa family was an advisor to Gbekpa, and given legitimacy because of his service. The current chief is from this family, and makes his headquarters in Bumpe.

=== Jongo ===
This house traces the lineage of a cousin to Barka, and also has its headquarters in Bumpe.

=== Kpandoma ===
The great-grandfather of this line was cousin to the Barka, and they also have their headquarters in Bumpeh.

=== Makavoray ===
This family is also related to Barka, and has its headquarter at Serabu.

== See also ==
- Sarah Culberson: Princess of the Mende chiefdom of Kposowa.
