= Sarah Culberson =

American actress and Mende princess

Princess Sarah
- Lady of Bumpe
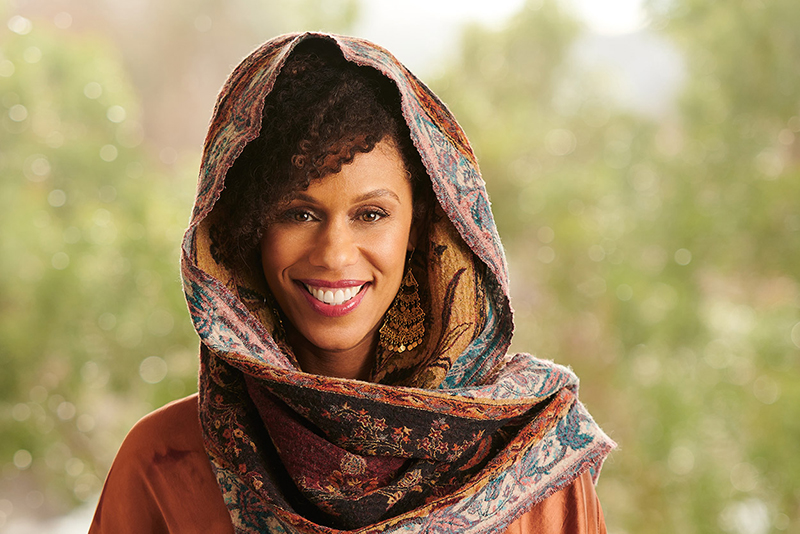
- Born: Esther Elizabeth Kposowa; Morgantown, West Virginia, U.S.
Names
- Sarah Jane Culberson
- House: Kposowa
- Father: Prince Joseph Konia Kposowa
- Occupation: actress; public speaker; educator; writer

Princess Sarah Jane Culberson, Lady of Bumpe (born Esther Elizabeth Kposowa) is an American actress, public speaker, educator, and writer. By birth she is a Mende princess of the Bumpe–Gao Chiefdom in Sierra Leone.

She is the co-founder of Sierra Leone Rising, a non-profit organization that raises funds to improve education, economic opportunities, and sustainable living for people in Sierra Leone. In 2009, she co-authored her memoir, titled A Princess Found: An American Family, an African Chiefdom, and the Daughter Who Connected Them All. The book is being considered by Disney for development as a film directed by Stephanie Allain with Culberson as executive producer.

== Personal life ==
Culberson was born Esther Elizabeth Kposowa in Morgantown, West Virginia, to an American mother and a Sierra Leonean father. She was placed into foster care as an infant and was later adopted by Jim and Judy Culberson, a couple in West Virginia. Her adoptive father was a professor of neuroanatomy at West Virginia University. Her adoptive mother was a special education instructor at an elementary school. She grew up not knowing anything about her birth parents. Culberson was raised in the United Methodist faith. Culberson played basketball, served as student body president, and was the homecoming queen at University High School. She received a theatre scholarship to West Virginia University and graduated in 1998. She later obtained a masters of fine arts degree from the American Conservatory Theater in San Francisco.

In 2004, Culberson hired a private investigator to find her biological parents. She discovered that her biological mother, a white woman from the United States named Penny, had died from cancer twelve years earlier and that her father, Prince Joseph Konia Kposowa, was a member of a Mende royal family. Her paternal grandfather, Francis Kposowa, had been the Paramount Chief of Bumpe in Sierra Leone. As a Mahaloi, or granddaughter of the Paramount Chief, she is accorded the status of princess by the Mende people. She reconnected with her father after writing him a letter. Her father revealed that he had been a visiting college student when she was conceived, and he and her mother agreed they were too young and not financially suitable to care for a child at that time. Upon arriving in Bumpe, the chiefdom granted her the title Bumpenya, which is Mende for Lady of Bumpe.

In August 2024, Culberson attended the wedding of Princess Märtha Louise of Norway and Durek Verrett in Geiranger.

== Career ==
In 2001, Culberson moved to Los Angeles to pursue an acting career. She has made appearances on the television shows Strong Medicine, In Case of Emergency, All of Us, Boston Legal, and The Secret Life of the American Teenager. She also had a role in the film American Dreamz.

From 2005 to 2007, Culberson was a dancer with CONTRA-TIEMPO, a professional dance company based in Los Angeles that specializes in Salsa, hip-hop, and contemporary dance performances. She now serves on the dance company's board of directors and continues to perform as a guest artist.

In 2006, Culberson co-founded Sierra Leone Rising, formerly known as Kposowa Foundation, a non-profit foundation that supports education, rebuilding of schools, and improving quality of life in the Bumpe Chiefdom of Sierra Leone after the civil war.

She worked as director of service learning at the Oakwood School in Los Angeles. As the service director, she organized a school service trip to Sierra Leone. She had previously worked at the Brentwood School, where she established a dance program.

In 2009, she co-authored the memoir A Princess Found: An American Family, an African Chiefdom, and the Daughter Who Connected Them All.

In 2019, Disney reached an agreement with Homegrown Pictures to develop Culberson's memoir and story into a film. An all-Black female team of scriptwriters and directors is expected to produce the film, with Stephanie Allain as producer, April Quioh as scriptwriter, and Culberson as executive producer and consultant.

In 2022, Culberson was awarded the Impact Award at Bounce TV's 30th Trumpet Awards. In 2023, she served on a panel with Princess Keisha Omilana to talk about diversity and inclusion, racial representation, African royalty, and the role of monarchy in the modern day.

== Filmography ==
=== Film ===
Year	Title	Role	Ref.
2006	American Dreamz	Montage Performer	

=== Television ===
Year	Title	Role	Ref.
2002	Strong Medicine	Mom #2	
2005	All of Us	Female Fan #2	
2006	Boston Legal	Female Assistant	
2007	In Case of Emergency	Olivia Ryan	
2009	The Secret Life of the American Teenager	Dr. Kposowa	
2010	Behind the Words	Self	
2021	Live It Up	Self	
