= Lavenham Guildhall =

Historic municipal building in Lavenham, Suffolk, England

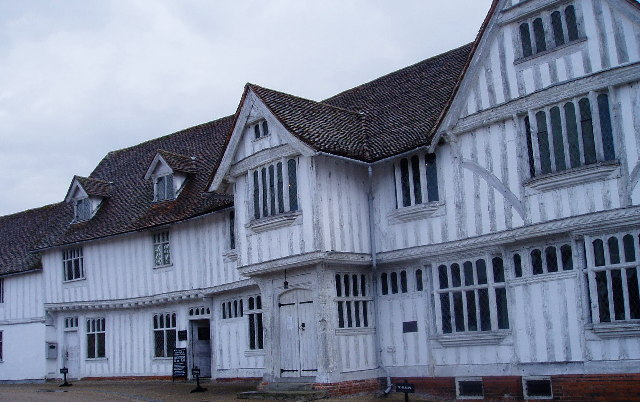

- Location within Suffolk
- 52.1088°N 0.7966°E
- Location: Lavenham, Suffolk

History
- Built: 1529

Site notes
- Architectural style: Jettied timber framing

Listed Building – Grade I
- Designated: 23 January 1958
- Reference no.: 1037186

Lavenham Guildhall is a timber-framed municipal building in Lavenham, Suffolk, England. It is Grade I listed.

== History ==
By the late 14th century, Lavenham was at the centre of the East Anglian woollen cloth trade. Its specialised production of woad-dyed broadcloth, known as Lavenham Blue, had made it one of the richest towns in England. (Note: One study ranked Lavenham as the fourteenth richest in the country based on the Lay Subsidy (i.e. tax revenue) of 1524, while another ranked one of its residents, Thomas Spring of Lavenham, as the wealthiest commoner in England by the time of his death in 1523.) This wealth was the catalyst for four guilds being established in the town by the local merchant families: the most important of these was the Guild of Corpus Christi formed in 1529. The guild established their guildhall at around that time; the design made extensive use of jettied timber framing and featured a gabled porch projecting from the centre of the building on the north-west elevation.

With the decline of the woollen cloth trade and Lavenham's prosperity, the guildhall's role changed. By 1689, the guildhall was in use as a bridewell, and from 1787 it was used as a workhouse. Prison cells and mortuary buildings were established in the area behind the guildhall in 1833. In 1887, the guildhall was acquired by Sir Cuthbert Quilter, a local member of parliament. He soon started restoring the building, but this was only completed in around 1911.

The building was used as a social club for American troops stationed nearby and also as a British Restaurant during the Second World War and, in 1946, Sir William Quilter gave it to the people of Lavenham. It became the property of the National Trust in 1951 and it was subsequently opened to the public as a local history museum.

Inside the guildhall, in addition to exhibits presenting the evolution of the guildhall from cloth trade to workhouse, there is a display of memorabilia associated with Lavenham railway station, which was a stop on the Long Melford–Bury St Edmunds branch line before it closed in 1961.
