= Lavenham Wool Hall =

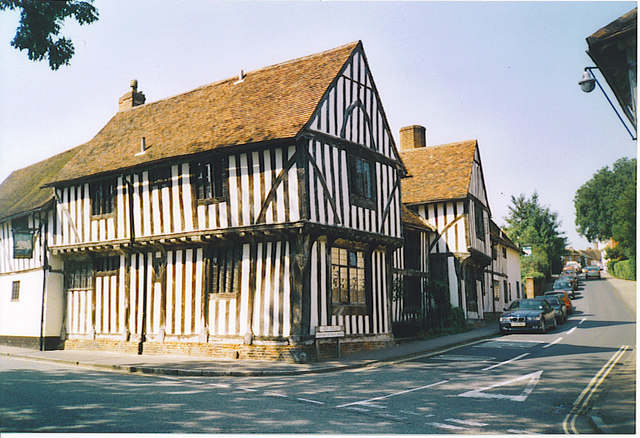

- Location within Suffolk
- Former names: The Hall of the Guild of the Blessed Virgin

General information
- Type: Guildhall
- Location: Lavenham
- Coordinates: 52.107519°N 0.796385°E
- Completed: 1464
- Client: The Guild of the Blessed Virgin

Technical details
- Structural system: Jettied timber framing

Lavenham Wool Hall, also known as the Swan Hotel, is a timber framed building on Lady Street in Lavenham, Suffolk, England. Dating from the fifteenth or sixteenth centuries, it has been protected since 1958 as a listed building (Grade I).

== History ==
The building started life as a guildhall. It belonged to the Guild of the Blessed Virgin, one of the four medieval guilds in Lavenham. It was converted into a Wool Hall in the late seventeenth century.

It was restored by Princess Louise, Duchess of Argyll around 1911 who then transferred it to Mrs Culver and it became the Railway Women's Convalescent Home. After the home closed, it was acquired by Trust Houses and incorporated into the Swan Hotel in 1963.

== See also ==
- Lavenham Guildhall
- Medieval English wool trade
