= Tikonko Chiefdom =

- Chiefdom
- Country: Sierra Leone
- Province: Southern Province
- District: Bo District
- Capital: Tikonko
- Time zone: UTC+0 (GMT)

Tikonko Chiefdom is a chiefdom in Bo District of Sierra Leone. Its capital is Tikonko.
