= Baoma Chiefdom =

- Chiefdom
- Interactive map of Baoma Chiefdom
- Country: Sierra Leone
- Province: Southern Province
- District: Bo District
- Capital: Baoma
- Time zone: UTC+0 (GMT)

Baoma Chiefdom is a chiefdom in Bo District of Sierra Leone. Its capital is Baoma.
