= Bagbo Chiefdom =

- Chiefdom
- Interactive map of Bagbo Chiefdom
- Coordinates: 7.60275°N 11.85613°W
- Country: Sierra Leone
- Province: Southern Province
- District: Bo District
- Capital: Jimmi
- Time zone: UTC+0 (GMT)

Bagbo Chiefdom is a chiefdom in Bo District of Sierra Leone. Its capital is Jimmi.

Bagbo Chiefdom is in the Bo District Southern Region, Sierra Leone, West Africa. Jimmi town is the Chiefdom Headquarter town, It is 37 km from Bo City and is an important Town that Host a Government Bordering Secondary School. Jimmi is the headquarter town of Bagbo that has a Government Secondary School for Boys and the Only Girls School within the Chiefdom where children from all over the country attend in a bordering home system. The girls School is also operated on a bordering home system Jimmi Town has once be used as for internally displace persons and refugees from Liberia.. Because of it strategic position and the only town with these facilities, people from other chiefdoms and district send their kids there to learn.

Bagbo Chiefdom constitute one of the strategic Chiefdom in the Southern Region situated between Four (4) chiefdoms, the Malen Chiefdom in the Pujehun District, the Lugbu Chiefdoms Bo District, the Tikonko Chiefdom Bo District and Kpanga Kemo Chiefdom in Bonthe. The Chiefdom mainly consists of a pastoralist population of approximately 25,884 that lives in a land mass of 276 square kilometers. The Gender base is 49.46% Male and 50.54% Female. The surrounded chiefdoms with the total population over 100,000. Being children from 1-14 and young people aged from 15 to 35 years. Adults from 36 to 55.

The main economics activities are of the people living in the chiefdom is farming, Gari and palm oil processing. Unfortunately, most of the youths have taken up bike riding and forgone the Agricultural work which has led to additional Poverty in the chiefdom. Many other youths have gone to Malen Chiefdom in search of job at the Oil palm plantation by Sucfin Industry
