= Baoma =

- Location in Sierra Leone
- Coordinates: 8°0′N 11°43′W
- Country: Sierra Leone
- Province: Southern Province
- District: Bo District
- Chiefdom: Baoma Chiefdom

Population (2009)
  - Total: 7,044
- Time zone: UTC+0 (GMT)

Baoma is a small town in Bo District in the Southern Province of Sierra Leone. As of 2009 it had an estimated population of 7,044.
