= Komboya Chiefdom =

- Chiefdom
- Country: Sierra Leone
- Province: Southern Province
- District: Bo District
- Capital: Njala
- Time zone: UTC+0 (GMT)

Komboya Chiefdom is a chiefdom in Bo District of Sierra Leone. Its capital is Njala.
