= Sierra Leone Rising =

California-based nonprofit organization

- Founded: 2005; 21 years ago
- Founder: Princess Sarah Culberson
- Type: Non-operating private foundation (IRS exemption status): 501(c)(3)
- Purpose: Education, Eradicating Poverty
- Location(s): Long Beach, California, and Sierra Leone
- Region served: Bumpe, Sierra Leone
- Method: Donations and Grants
- Website: www.sierraleonerising.org
- Formerly called: Kposowa Foundation

Sierra Leone Rising (formerly the Kposowa Foundation) is a non-profit organization that fosters quality education, supports female empowerment, and contributes to public health in Sierra Leone. They are based out of Long Beach, California, United States. It was co-founded by Princess Sarah Culberson and John Woehrle.

The purpose of Sierra Leone Rising is to raise funds to rebuild a boarding school, provide clean drinking water, provide economically sustainable opportunities, and improve the general quality of life for the people of Bumpe, a villarge in Sierra Leone, West Africa.

== History ==
Bumpe High School (BHS) was ransacked and burned by the Revolutionary United Front rebels during the decade-long civil war in Sierra Leone that lasted from 1991 to 2002. Most of the buildings and furnishings were destroyed or stolen. BHS was once a renowned boarding school with an enrollment of over 600 students from as far away as Nigeria.

== Projects ==
The first goal of Sierra Leone Rising was to rebuild Bumpe High School. The second goal was to sustain the children who were educated there.

=== Completed projects ===
12 classrooms were rebuilt to help the school start functioning again.

Due to significant support from The Rotary Foundation, US$50,000 was used to construct new wells so that residents of the high school had access to safe, drinkable water.

Sierra Leone Rising helped to rebuild the home economics building at Bumpe High School which was burned down by the rebels during the civil war.

Boys and girls dormitories were built so that children who lived ten miles away did not have to walk to school every day. This improvement also helped to ensure that the children attended school on a regular basis.

The Bumpe High School library was rebuilt allowing students to have access to books which is rare in Sierra Leone.

Newly rehabilitated staff quarters for the recruiting of female teachers at Bumpe High School.

Bicycles are provided for students who walk several miles daily to attend Bumpe High School.

A new computer lab was built at Bumpe High School where girls are learning coding.

=== Ongoing projects ===
Because public school is not free in Sierra Leone, Sierra Leone Rising is looking to create a scholarship fund for those who cannot afford an education. Sierra Leone Rising is gathering supplies for the Home Economics Building such as sewing machines, pots, pans, utensils, gas cookers, freezers, etc.

The Dining Hall is being rebuilt. When the project is finished it will serve as not only a cafeteria but a central meeting place to share artwork, poetry, and to have discussions.

== Media coverage ==
=== TV appearances ===
- Good Morning America 9/19/06, with Robyn Roberts
- Inside Edition / Cheryl Lamothe, 1 1/2 minute, 9/19/06 with Kim
- CNN The American Morning with Solidad O'Brien, 9/20/06
- Southern California Life / KVMD TV Los Angeles, Feb, 28, 2007
- Naomi Judd Morning show, March 13, 2007
- WBOY Channel 12 in Morgantown West Virginia, Nov. 2006
- Intel Campaign filmed 2008 on line "What inspires you", filmed by UNCLE - Rachel North Co-producer UNCLE

=== Magazines and newspapers ===
- Positive People Magazine in London
- Trace Magazine based in London
- Newsweek
- People, Maureen Parrington
- Reader's Digest / Ken Miller Nov. 2007 "ken_miller@readersdigest.com
- Corridor Magazine West Virginia
- West Virginia Alumni Magazine
- Los Angeles Times article (Front Page Sept. 2006)
- Chicago Tribune 2006
- Singapore News 2006

=== Radio ===
- BBC/Owen Phillips Sept. 2006
- Atlanta Radio "African Exp. Radio 2006
- Oprah and Friends Radio show with Gayle King 2006
- NPR (National Public Radio) with Farai Chideya May 1, 2007 (listen on the website) "Farai Chideya",
- WCLG in Morgantown West Virginia with Becky Hun Nov. 2006
- WAJR in Morgantown West Virginia with Becky Hun with Kay Murray Nov. 2006
- Princess Sarah and the Kposowa Foundation have been featured in various magazines including People

== Supporting foundations ==
- Cowboy
- Groove Wallets
- The LemonAid Fund
- Rotary International
