= Selenga Chiefdom =

- Chiefdom
- Interactive map of Selenga Chiefdom
- Coordinates: 8.118°N 11.732°W
- Country: Sierra Leone
- Province: Southern Province
- District: Bo District
- Capital: Dambala
- Time zone: UTC+0 (GMT)

Selenga Chiefdom is a chiefdom in Bo District of Sierra Leone. Its capital is Dambala.
