= Kakua Chiefdom =

- Chiefdom
- Interactive map of Kakua Chiefdom
- Coordinates: 7.96°N 11.74°W
- Country: Sierra Leone
- Province: Southern Province
- District: Bo District
- Capital: Bo town
- Time zone: UTC+0 (GMT)

Kakua Chiefdom is a chiefdom in Bo District of Sierra Leone. Its capital is Bo town.
