= Bagbwe Chiefdom =

- Chiefdom
- Country: Sierra Leone
- Province: Southern Province
- District: Bo District
- Capital: Ngarlu
- Time zone: UTC+0 (GMT)

Bagbwe Chiefdom is a chiefdom in Bo District of Sierra Leone. Its capital is Ngarlu.
