= Baiima =

- Location in Sierra Leone
- Coordinates: 8°7′N 11°30′W
- Country: Sierra Leone
- Province: Southern Province
- District: Bo District

Population (2009)
  - Total: 4,116
- Time zone: UTC+0 (GMT)

Baiima is a small town in Bo District in the Southern Province of Sierra Leone. As of 2009 it had an estimated population of 4,116.

It is served by a railway station
