= Telu =

- Location in Sierra Leone
- Coordinates: 7°48′13″N 11°38′21″W
- Country: Sierra Leone
- Province: Southern Province
- District: Bo District
- Chiefdom: Bongor Chiefdom
- Time zone: UTC-5 (GMT)

Telu is a village in Bo District in the Southern Province of Sierra Leone. The predominant ethnic group in the village are the Mende, and the Mende language is the most widely spoken language in the village.
