= Eric B. Jumu =

Sierra Leonean politician

Eric B. Jumu is a Sierra Leonean politician. He is a member of the Sierra Leone People's Party and is one of the representatives in the Parliament of Sierra Leone for Bo District, elected in 2007.
