= Corpus Christi guilds =

Corpus Christi guilds were medieval religious guilds centering around the Feast of Corpus Christi and the Corpus Christi procession. Other common aims of the guilds were providing altar candles to illuminate the Sacred Host and accompanying priests when taking communion to the sick or dying.

It was a common dedication for English guilds. There were also a number of confréries dedicated to Corpus Christi in France.

== Examples ==
- The Cambridge Guild of Corpus Christi, which became Corpus Christi College, Cambridge
- A London Corpus Christi guild founded in the Church of All Hallows, Bread Street became the Worshipful Company of Salters
- In medieval Ipswich the town's Gild Merchant after losing its monopoly transformed into a religious guild of Corpus Christi and founded Ipswich School
- The Corpus Christi Guild in York was a guild that attracted a large proportion of the city's elite including the Archbishop

== Sources ==
- Dossat, Yves (1976). "Les confréries du Corpus Christi dans le monde rural pendant la première moitié du XIVe siècle". Cahiers de Fanjeaux (in French). 11: 357–385.
- MacCulloch, Diarmaid (2009). A History of Christianity: The First Three Thousand Years. London: Allen Lane. ISBN 978-0-7139-9869-6.
- Rubin, Miri (1986). "Corpus Christi Fraternities and Late Medieval Piety". Studies in Church History. 23. Cambridge University Press: 97–109. doi:10.1017/S0424208400010561.
- Scarisbrick, Jack Joseph (1984). The Reformation and the English People. Oxford: Blackwell.
