= Bumpe =

- Location in Sierra Leone
- Coordinates: 7°53′28″N 11°54′19″W
- Country: Sierra Leone
- Province: Southern Province
- District: Bo District
- Chiefdom: Bumpe–Gao Chiefdom

Population (2013)
  - Total: 16,123
- Time zone: UTC+0 (GMT)

Bumpe is a small town in Bo District in the Southern Province of Sierra Leone. As of 2013 it had an estimated population of 16,123. The town is located south-west of Bo.

The town is also known as Bompeh, and both names are applied to a local river. Sir Samuel Rowe, the British Colonial Governor, visited the area in 1880.

Pan Pacific Investments Corporation (SL) Limited has a license to mine for diamonds in Bompeh.

== See also ==
- House of Kposowa
- Mende people
- Bumpe–Gao Chiefdom
