= List of people from Lincolnshire =

There are many notable people associated with Lincolnshire. The following list is arranged chronologically by date of birth.

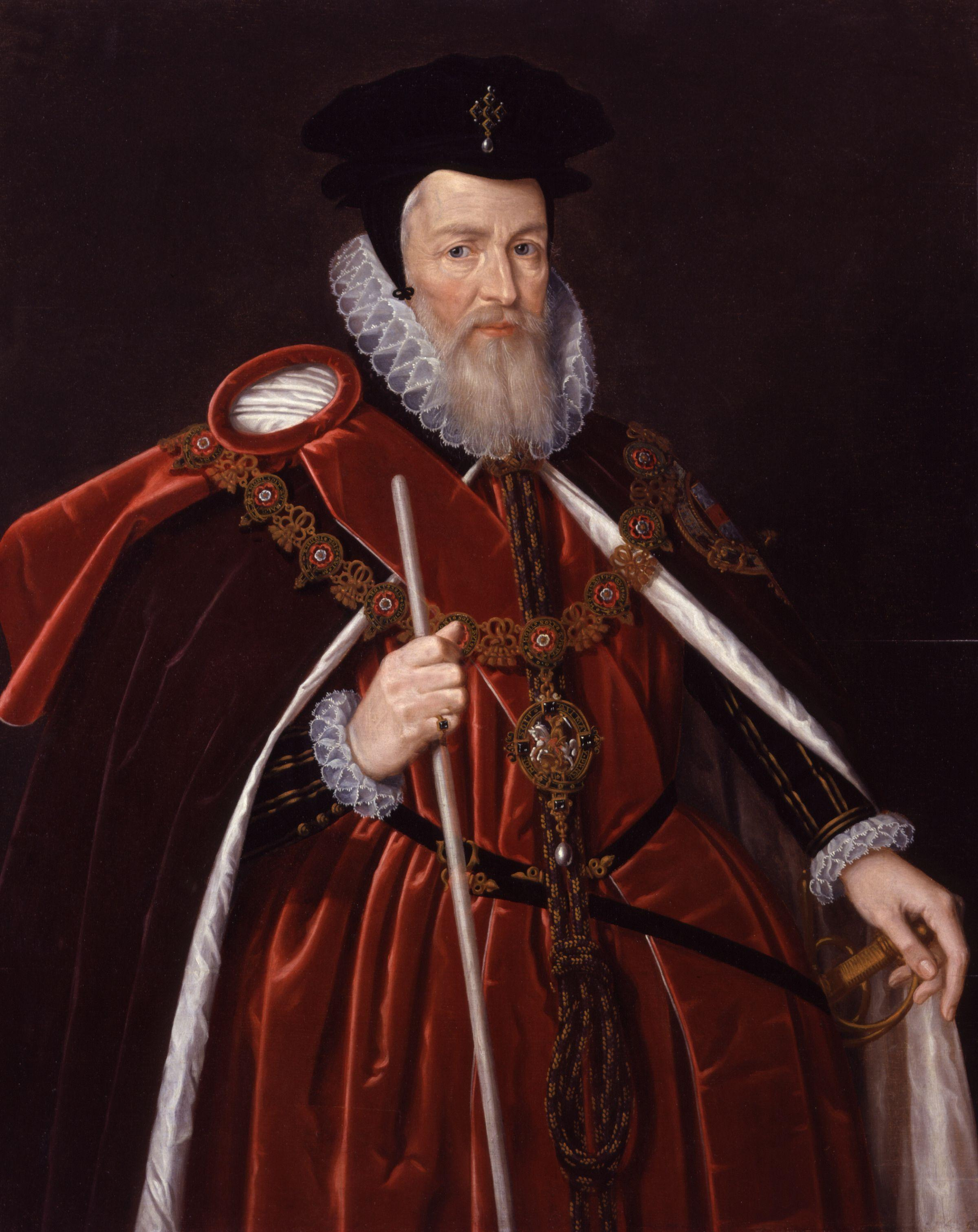
William Cecil, 1st Baron Burghley

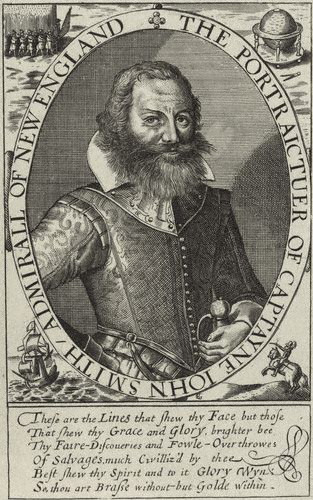
Captain John Smith

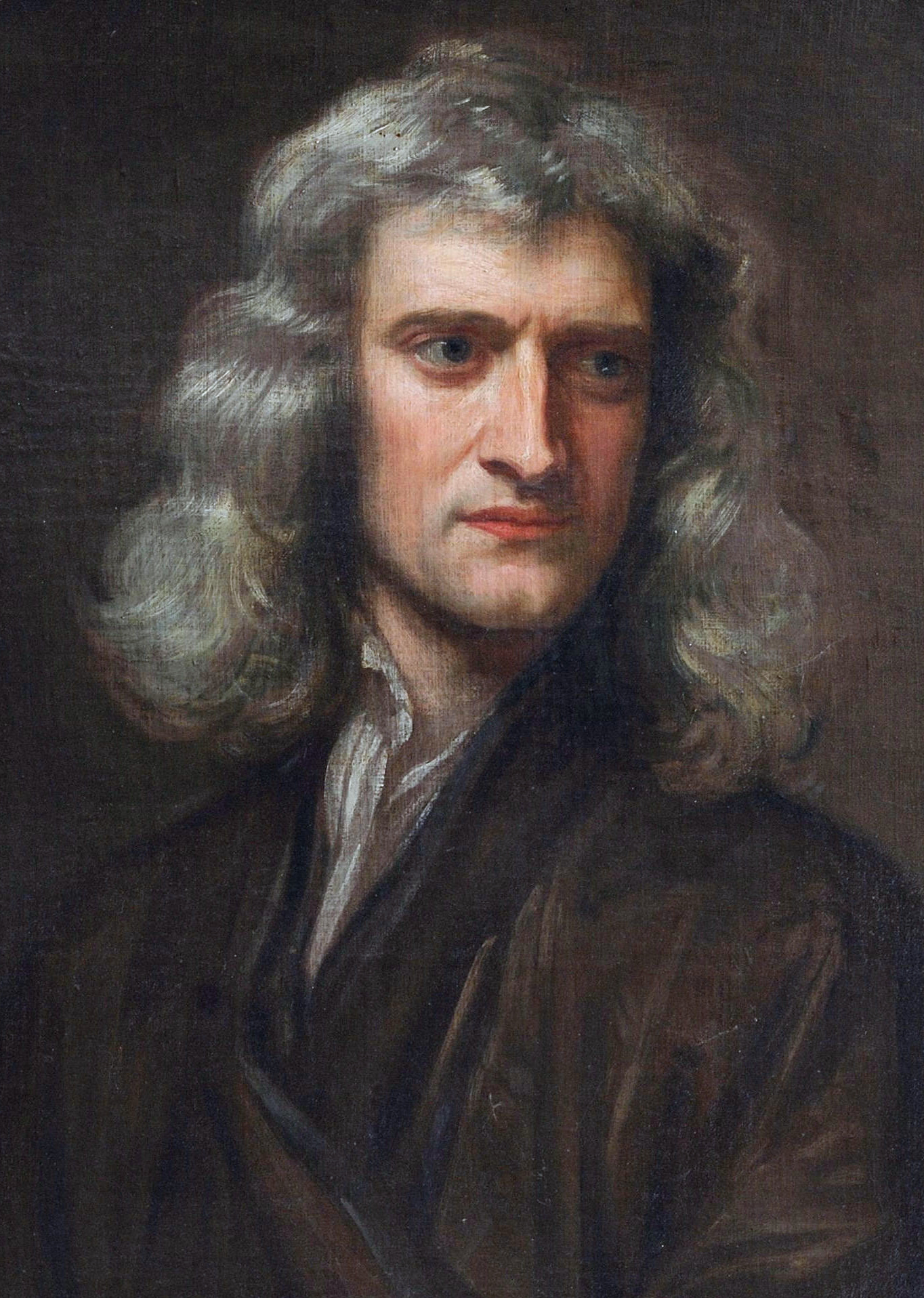
Sir Isaac Newton

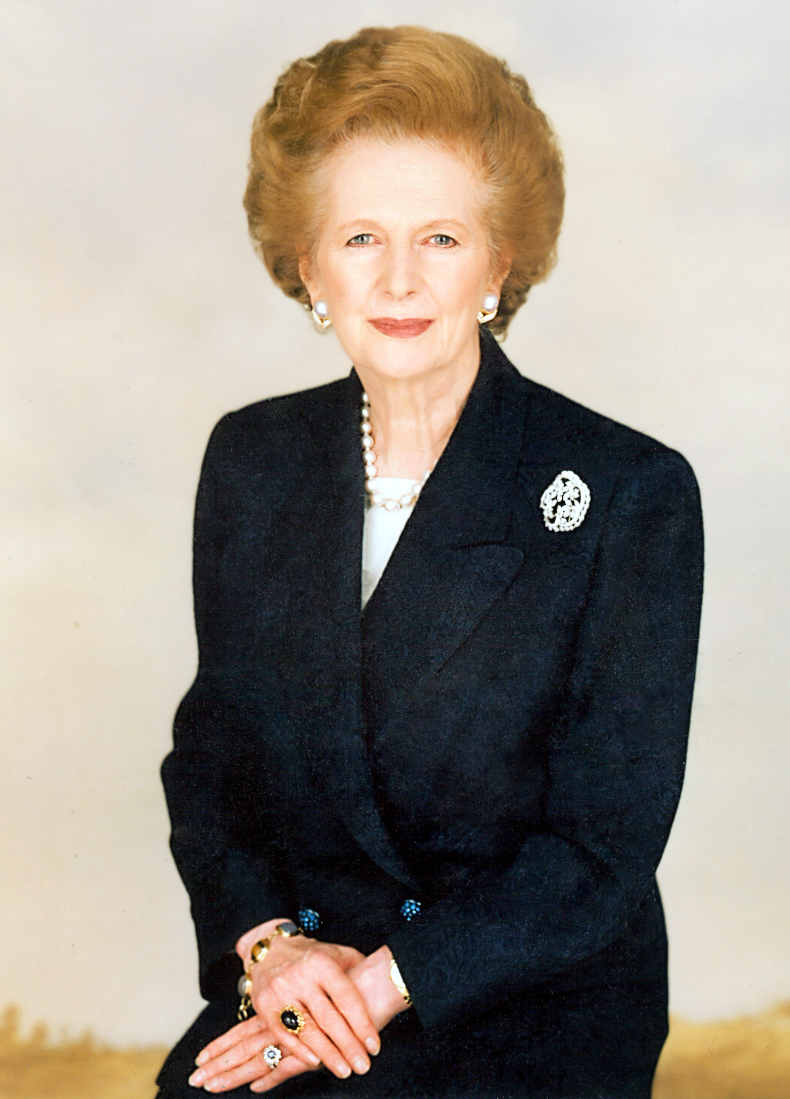
Margaret Thatcher

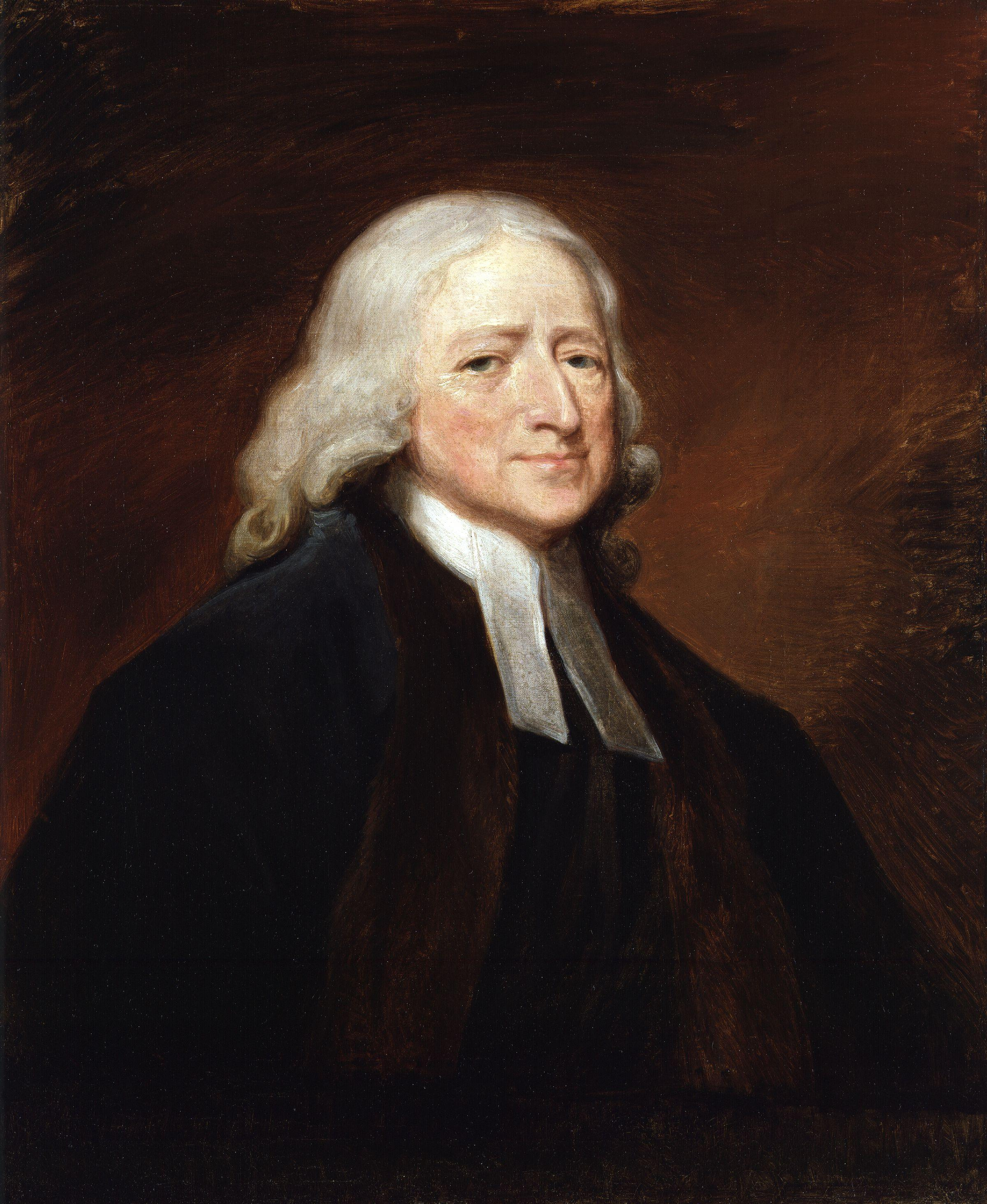
John Wesley

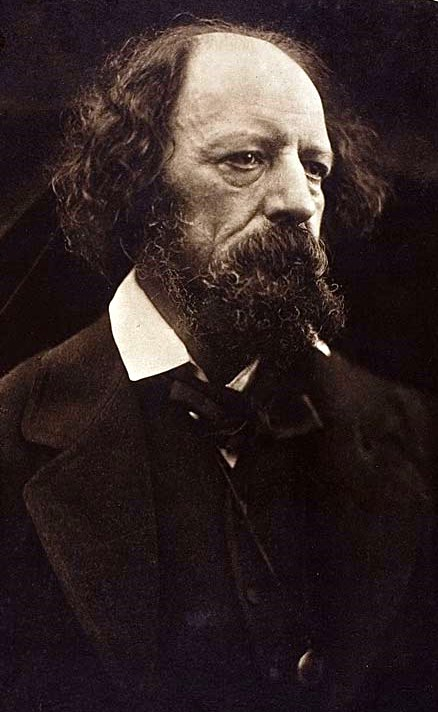
Alfred, Lord Tennyson

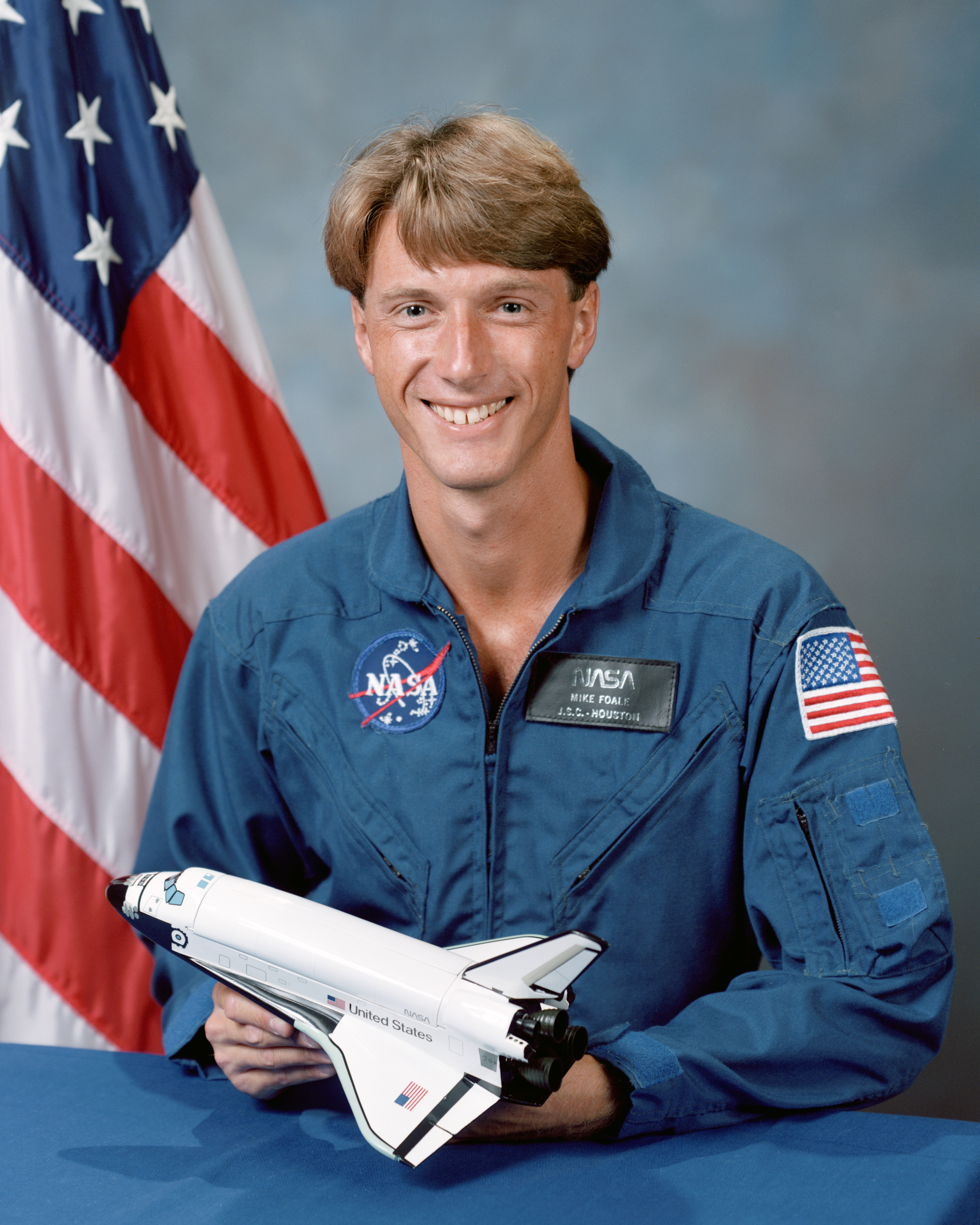
Michael Foale

== Born before 1701 ==
- Guthlac of Crowland (674–715), Christian saint
- Æthelhard (8th century–805), Archbishop of Canterbury
- Hereward the Wake (c. 1035–c. 1072), Anglo-Saxon nobleman
- Lucy of Bolingbroke (1074–1136), countess of Chester
- Gilbert of Sempringham (c. 1085–1190), Saint and Founder of the Gilbertine Order
- Aaron of Lincoln (c. 1125–1186), financier
- Hugh of Lincoln (1135/40–1200), Bishop of Lincoln
- Stephen Langton (c. 1150–1228), Archbishop of Canterbury
- Nicolaa de la Haye (c. 1150–1230), landowner and administrator
- Robert Grosseteste (c. 1175–1253), Bishop of Lincoln
- Berechiah de Nicole (c. 1210–c. 1270), Tosafist
- Eleanor of Castile (1241–1290), wife of Edward I
- Little Saint Hugh of Lincoln (1246–1255), blood libel victim
- Katherine Swynford (c. 1350–1403), third wife of John of Gaunt
- Henry IV of England (1367–1413), King of England
- Richard Foxe (1458–1528), bishop and founder of Corpus Christi College, Oxford
- John Taverner (c. 1490–1545), composer and organist
- John Whitgift (c. 1503–1604), Archbishop of Canterbury
- John Foxe (c. 1516–1587), author of Foxe's Book of Martyrs
- William Cecil, 1st Baron Burghley (1520–1598), Chief Advisor to Queen Elizabeth I
- Anne Askew (1521–1546), Protestant martyr
- Edmund Sheffield, 1st Baron Sheffield (1521–1549), Baron of Sheffield
- John Sheffield, 2nd Baron Sheffield (c. 1538–1568), Baron of Sheffield
- William Byrd (1539–1623), composer
- John Smyth (c. 1554–c. 1612), founder of the Baptist denomination
- Robert Tighe (1562–1620), cleric and linguist
- Captain John Smith (1580–1631), leader of the settlement of Jamestown, Virginia
- John Cotton (1585–1652), clergyman
- Anne Bradstreet (1612–1672), poet
- John Leverett (1616–1678/79), penultimate governor of the Massachusetts Bay Colony
- Simon Patrick (1626–1707), English theologian and bishop
- Sir Isaac Newton (1642–1746), mathematician and physicist
- John Harrison (1693–1776), chronometer innovator
- William Stukeley (1687–1765), antiquarian

== Born 1701–1850 ==
- John (1703-1791) and Charles Wesley (1707-1788), founders of the Methodist movement
- Benjamin Huntsman (1704-1776), inventor of crucible steel
- Joseph Banks (1743–1820), botanist and naturalist
- Samuel Eyles Pierce (1746–1829), preacher and theologian
- Thomas Scott (1747–1821), Bible commentator and co-founder of the Church Missionary Society
- George Bass (1771–c. 1803), explorer of Australia
- Matthew Flinders (1774–1814), navigator and cartographer
- Richard Watson (1781–1833), theologian and Methodist writer
- George Davenport (1783–1845), sailor and frontiersman
- Peter De Wint (1784–1849), landscape painter
- Pishey Thompson (1784–1862), publisher and antiquarian writer
- Sir John Franklin (1786–1847), Arctic explorer
- Andreas Kalvos (1792–1869), poet
- Christopher Wordsworth (1807–1885), Bishop of Lincoln
- Alfred Lord Tennyson (1809–1892), poet
- Herbert Ingram (1811–1860), journalist
- Lady Charlotte Guest (1812–1895), businesswoman and Welsh language translator
- George Boole (1815–1864), mathematician
- William Marwood (1818–1883), hangman
- Jean Ingelow (1820–1897), poet
- Charles Frederick Worth (1825–1895), fashion designer
- George Bower iron founder and inventor
- Edward King (1829–1910), Bishop of Lincoln
- Charlotte Alington Barnard (1830–1869), ballad composer and hymn writer
- Joseph Ruston (1835–1897), engineer and manufacturer
- George Green (Medal of Honor) (1840–1898), Medal of Honor recipient
- Gonville Bromhead (1845–1891), Victoria Cross recipient
- Madge Kendal (1848–1935), actress

== Born 1851–1950 ==
- Sarah Swift (1854–1937), Royal College of Nursing founder
- Frank Bramley (1857–1915), artist
- Adrian Woodruffe-Peacock (1858–1922), clergyman and ecologist
- William Robertson (1860–1933), Field Marshal
- Halford Mackinder (1861–1947), geographer
- Thomas Colclough Watson (1867–1917), Victoria Cross recipient
- Cyril Bland (1872–1950), cricketer
- William Tritton (1875–1946), tank developer
- Frank Pick (1878–1941), railway administrator
- Sybil Thorndike (1882–1976), actress
- Alfred Piccaver (1884–1958), tenor
- Arthur Lucan (1885–1954), part of the music hall act Old Mother Riley
- Charles Richard Sharpe (1889–1963), Victoria Cross recipient
- Harold Jackson (1892–1918), Victoria Cross recipient
- Ethel Rudkin (1893–1985), folklorist and archaeologist
- Francis Arthur Sutton (1894–1944), mercenary
- Sir Francis Hill (1899 –1980), historian and Mayor of Lincoln. Chancellor of Nottingham University.
- Frank Whittle (1907–1996), RAF officer
- John George Haigh (1909–1949), serial killer
- Douglas Bader (1910–1982), RAF flying ace
- James Cobban (1910–1999), educator and headmaster
- Chad Varah (1911–2007), priest and "The Samaritans" founder
- Ted Savage (1912–1964), footballer
- Joseph Nickerson (1914–1990), entrepreneur
- Guy Gibson (1918–1944), bomber pilot and Victoria Cross recipient
- Liz Smith (1921–2016), actress
- Leslie Manser (1922–1942), bomber pilot and Victoria Cross recipient
- Brian Tierney (1922–2019), historian
- Nicholas Parsons (1923–2020), radio and TV presenter
- Neville Marriner (1924–2016), violinist and conductor
- Margaret Thatcher (1925–2013), former Prime Minister
- Elizabeth Jennings (1926–2001), poet
- Brenda Fisher (1927–2022), swimmer
- Joan Plowright (1929–2025), actress
- Jeff Hall (1929–1959), footballer
- Colin Dexter (1930–2017), crime writer
- Bill Podmore (1931–1994), television producer
- Neil McCarthy (1932–1985), actor
- Frank Sargeant (born 1932), retired Anglican bishop
- Mervyn Winfield (1932–2014), cricketer
- Bernard Codd (1934–2013), motorcycle road racer
- Victor Emery (1934–2002), physicist
- Mike Pinner (1934–2023), football goalkeeper
- Peter Collinson (1936–1980), film director
- Bruce Barrymore Halpenny (1937–2015), military historian and author
- Roy Axe (1937–2010), car designer
- Barry Spikings (born 1939), Hollywood producer
- John Alderton (born 1940), actor
- John Hurt (1940–2017), actor
- Jo Kendall (1940–2022), actress
- Ted Lewis (1940–1982), crime writer
- Graham Oates (born 1943), footballer
- John Hargreaves (born 1944), cricketer
- Tony Jacklin (born 1944), golfer
- Roger Scruton (1944–2020), philosopher
- Graham Taylor (1944–2017), footballer, club and England national team manager.
- Chris Wright (born 1944), music industry executive and businessman
- Patricia Hodge (born 1946), actress
- Iain Matthews (born 1946), singer-songwriter and musician
- Philip Priestley (1946–2022), former British diplomat
- Richard Budge (1947–2016), coal mining entrepreneur
- Mick Atkin (1948–2008), football half-back
- Ray Clemence (1948–2020), football goalkeeper
- Jim Broadbent (born 1949), actor
- Geoff Capes (1949–2024), shot putter and twice World's strongest man
- Richard P. Cook (born 1949), artist
- Rod Temperton (1949–2016), songwriter, record producer and musician
- Bernie Taupin (born 1950), songwriter

== Born 1951 onwards ==
- Brian Bolland (born 1951), comics artist
- John Ward (born 1951), footballer
- David Ward (born 1953), former Member of Parliament (MP)
- Michael Foale (born 1957), astronaut
- Jennifer Saunders (born 1958), actress and comedian
- Chris Woods (born 1959), football goalkeeper
- Lee Chapman (born 1959), footballer
- Glenn Cockerill (born 1959), footballer
- Simon Garner (born 1959), footballer
- Alan Moulder (born 1959), record producer, mixing engineer and audio engineer
- John Cridland (born 1961), former Director-General of the Confederation of British Industry (CBI); Chair of Transport for the North (TfN)
- Bill Dunham (born 1961), former Deputy Commandant General of the Royal Marines
- Colin McFarlane (born 1961), actor
- Stephen Sackur (born 1964), broadcaster and journalist
- Jonathan Van-Tam (born 1964), specialist in influenza, and former Deputy Chief Medical Officer for England
- Helen Fospero (born 1966), newsreader and journalist
- Antonio Berardi (born 1968), fashion designer
- Beverley Allitt (born 1968), serial killer
- Samantha Cameron (born 1971), businesswoman and wife of the former Prime Minister David Cameron
- Rae Earl (born 1971), author
- Robert Webb (born 1972), actor, comedian and writer
- Jonathan Kerrigan (born 1972), actor
- Paul Palmer (born 1974), swimmer
- Abi Titmuss (born 1976), poker player and glamour model
- Steve Housham (born 1976), footballer and manager
- Danny Butterfield (born 1979), footballer
- Colin Furze (born 1979), inventor and YouTube personality
- Kelly Adams (born 1979), actress
- Dan Haigh (born 1980), musician
- Sheridan Smith (born 1981), actress
- Paul Mayo (born 1981), footballer
- Guy Martin (born 1981), motorcycle racer and television presenter
- Kevin Clifton (born 1982), professional dancer and actor
- Joanne Clifton (born 1983), professional dancer and actress
- Lloyd Griffith (born 1983), comedian, actor, presenter and singer
- Carl Hudson (born 1983), musician
- Ross Edgley (born 1985), extreme adventurer, ultra-marathon sea swimmer and author
- Nicola Roberts (born 1985), singer
- Oliver Ryan (born 1985), footballer
- Luke Wright (born 1985), cricketer
- Lee Frecklington (born 1985), footballer
- Kate Haywood (born 1987), swimmer
- Spencer Matthews (born 1988), television personality and entrepreneur
- Jake Quickenden (born 1988), television personality
- Emma Bristow (born 1990), motorcycle racer
- Sam Clucas (born 1990), footballer
- Georgie Twigg (born 1990), hockey player
- Sophie Wells (born 1990), para-equestrian
- Scott Williams (born 1990), darts player
- Thomas Turgoose (born 1992), actor
- Eliza Butterworth (born 1993), actress
- Patrick Bamford (born 1993), footballer
- Jack Harvey (born 1993), racing driver
- Hollie Arnold (born 1994), javelin thrower
- Ella Henderson (born 1996), singer and songwriter
- Holly Humberstone (born 1999), singer and songwriter
- Ellis Chapman (born 2001), footballer
- Ollie Chessum (Born 2000), rugby player
- Will Wand (born 2001), rugby player
