= The Last Storytellers: Tales from the Heart of Morocco =

2011 book by Richard Hamilton

- Front cover of The Last Storytellers
- Author: Richard Hamilton
- Language: English
- Genre: Traditional Moroccan oral storytelling
- Publisher: I.B. Tauris
- Publication date: 30 May 2011
- Publication place: United States and United Kingdom
- Media type: Print (Hardback)
- Pages: 264 pp.
- ISBN: 978-1-84885-491-8

The Last Storytellers: Tales from the Heart of Morocco is a book by radio and television journalist Richard Hamilton. The book contains a foreword by the travel writer and publisher Barnaby Rogerson.

The Last Storytellers explores the roots of traditional storytelling, the background of a number of oral storytellers whom the author met whilst working for the BBC in Morocco, and it contains an anthology of thirty six of the tales they tell.

== Background ==
The Last Storytellers explores the roots of traditional storytelling, the background of a number of oral storytellers whom the author met whilst working for the BBC in Morocco, and it contains an anthology of thirty six of the tales they tell.

As a reviewer notes, the famous square and market place Jemaa el-Fnaa in Marrakesh has hosted professional storytellers since the foundation of the city in 1070 by the Almoravid leader Abu Bakr ibn Umar. Now, however, only a handful of these storytellers remain at such places, "captivating audiences with tales and stories of love and death, trickery and justice", and the art is in decline. In 2008, the United Nations agency UNESCO recognized Jemaa el-Fnaa as the first "Masterpiece of the Oral and Intangible Heritage of Humanity."

Speaking in an interview given to the Society for Storytelling, Richard Hamilton says that he first met the storytellers — "without exception, elderly men at the end of their career" — whilst on a related assignment for the BBC at the end of 2006. This interest developed into what he terms "an obsession", or calling, to collect as many stories as he could, whilst he still could, with the help of a local resident, Ahmed Tija, who interpreted the Darija Arabic dialect of the storytellers.

In the same interview, explaining why he thinks the art of traditional storytelling is disappearing, Hamilton suggests that we have become "obsessed by modern technology and social networking sites and computer games and television to the point where we struggle to sit down for an hour or so to listen"; that this has had a detrimental effect on our concentration span; and that even Moroccans are "in a hurry" and similarly affected by such changes these days.

== Reception ==
In Essential Travel magazine, the reviewer writes: "The Last Storytellers is a truly unique literary concept that puts ancient stories from the Moroccan tradition of oral storytelling into print."

In the Abu Dhabi-based newspaper The National, Noori Passela writes that the stories "range from expeditions featuring a bold hero and an elusive princess to be won over (The Gazelle with the Golden Horns) to the more symbolic and moral (The Birth of the Sahara). There are also many that border on scandal, using a repertoire of love, lust and betrayal to shock (The Eyes of Ben'Adi). Dramatic fare all around, but with entertainment being the sole purpose, this is hardly a let-down. Instead, this is addictive material."

In the New York Journal of Books, Janice Durante is of the opinion that "as the pasha does in The Red Lantern, author Hamilton presents readers with a precious gift: a collection of content not quite like anything we’ve heard or seen before. Readers who might never reach Marrakesh can find their own oasis by making a cup of mint tea and giving thanks for these enchanting stories rescued from oblivion."

In The Times Literary Supplement, author, Arabist, analyst and desert explorer Eamonn Gearon writes, "The book's introduction is right to highlight the universal nature of storytelling, not just in the primal urge to tell stories, but also in the common threads that run through these from one side of the globe to the remotest other."

"As for the stories," Gearon continues, "the usual themes are well represented: beautiful maidens; marital infidelity; jealous husbands; cruel sultans; avaricious viziers; poverty; punishment; sorrow; magic; joy; and more than one happy ending."

Gearon describes The Last Storytellers as a "charming, fantastical and lively collection". "Like a genie emerging from a flask, The Last Storytellers produces a startling amount of pleasure from some very small packages [short stories]." "Both men [author and interpreter] deserve much praise for the successful outcome of this endeavour."

== About the author ==
Richard Hamilton has practiced as a professional broadcast journalist, correspondent and contributing editor since 1998, working for the BBC News, BBC World Service and on-line. His work has taken him to Madagascar, Morocco and South Africa.

Hamilton co-authored the Time Out Guide to Marrakech and has written throughout his career for various newspapers and magazines, including Condé Nast Traveler and The Times.

Hamilton has an MA in African Studies from the School of Oriental and African Studies (SOAS). He lives in London, England and is married with two children.

=== Other books ===
- Hamilton, Richard, Tangier: From the Romans to the Rolling Stones, Tauris Parke, 2019, ISBN 978-1784533434
- Hamilton, Richard (co-author), "Time Out" Guide to Marrakesh and the Best of Morocco, Penguin, 2003, ISBN 978-0141008912

== Related material ==
- Hamilton, Richard (22 January 2012). "The Disappearing Art of Morocco's Storytellers". New Africa Analysis.
- Staff (16 November 2011). "Interview: Richard Hamilton". Society for Storytelling.
- Hamilton, Richard (5 October 2011). "Can the art of storytelling be preserved?". BBC News Middle East.

== See also ==
- Oral literature
- Oral tradition
- Storytelling
