= British military intervention in the Sierra Leone Civil War =

British forces involvement in Sierra Leone, 2000

The United Kingdom began a military intervention in Sierra Leone on 7 May 2000 under the codename Operation Palliser. Although small numbers of British personnel had been deployed previously, Palliser was the first large-scale intervention by British forces in the Sierra Leone Civil War. In early May 2000, the Revolutionary United Front (RUF)—one of the main parties to the civil war—advanced on the country's capital, Freetown, prompting the British government to dispatch an "Operational Reconnaissance and Liaison Team" (ORLT) to prepare to evacuate foreign citizens. On 6 May, the RUF blocked the road connecting Freetown to the country's main airport, Lungi. The next day, British soldiers began to secure the airport and other areas essential to an evacuation. The majority of those who wished to leave were evacuated within the first two days of the operation, but many chose to stay following the arrival of British forces.

Once the evacuation was effectively complete, the mandate of the British forces began to expand. They assisted with the evacuation of besieged peacekeepers—including several British ceasefire observers—and began to assist the United Nations Mission in Sierra Leone (UNAMSIL) and the Sierra Leone Army (SLA). Despite the mission expansion, it was not until 17 May that British soldiers came into direct contact with the RUF. The rebels attacked a British position near Lungi airport, but were forced to retreat after a series of firefights. On the same day, the RUF's leader, Foday Sankoh, was captured by Sierra Leonean forces, leaving the RUF in disarray. After deciding that the RUF would not disarm voluntarily, the British began training the SLA for a confrontation. During the training mission, a patrol returning from a visit to Jordanian peacekeepers was taken captive by a militia group known as the West Side Boys. Negotiations achieved the release of five of the eleven soldiers, and three weeks into the crisis, British special forces launched a mission codenamed Operation Barras, freeing the remaining six. The success of Operation Barras restored confidence in the British mission; one academic suggested that its failure would have forced the British government to withdraw all its forces from Sierra Leone.

The overall British operation was mostly completed by September 2000. The RUF began to disarm after political pressure and economic sanctions were exerted on Liberia—which had supported the RUF in exchange for conflict diamonds smuggled out of Sierra Leone. The Sierra Leonean government eventually signed a ceasefire with the RUF that obliged the latter to enter the Disarmament, Demobilisation, and Reintegration (DDR) process. By September 2001, when the British training teams were replaced by an international force, the DDR process was almost complete. British forces continued to be involved in Sierra Leone by providing the largest contribution of personnel to the international training team and advising on a restructuring of Sierra Leone's armed forces. A small force was deployed to the area in 2003 to ensure stability while several indictments and arrests were made by the Special Court for Sierra Leone. The success of British operations in Sierra Leone vindicated several concepts, including the retention of high-readiness forces. The Prime Minister, Tony Blair, was keen to see Western interventions in other conflicts, and—along with France—supported the creation of several European Union Battlegroups for the purpose. As it happened, political opposition and later British commitments in Afghanistan and Iraq prevented further British operations in Africa.

== Background ==
=== Sierra Leone ===
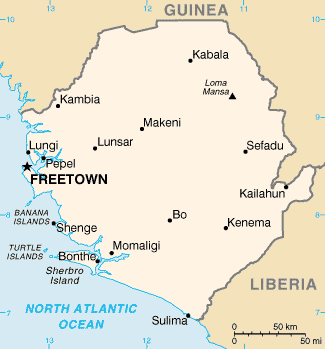
A map of Sierra Leone showing the capital Freetown, Lungi airport, and several other locations of British operations

Sierra Leone is a country in West Africa, close to the equator, with an area of 71,740 square kilometres (27,700 square miles)—similar in size to South Carolina or Scotland. It shares land borders with Guinea and Liberia and is bordered to the west by the Atlantic Ocean. The country became a British colony in 1808, though British influence began in the late 18th century when former slaves were settled in the area that became known as Freetown, now the capital city. Freetown lies on a peninsula, and is separated from the country's main airport, Lungi, by the estuary of the Sierra Leone River, which is several miles wide. The colony was granted independence from the United Kingdom in 1961 and Sir Milton Margai was appointed its first prime minister. He was replaced in 1962 by his brother, Albert, who was defeated by Siaka Stevens in the 1967 general election. Stevens was overthrown within hours by the commander of the army, but was later reinstated after the commander was himself overthrown. Sierra Leone became a republic in 1971, and Stevens was installed as its first president.

In 1978, Sierra Leone formally became a one-party state and the All People's Congress (APC) became the only legal political party. Stevens retired in 1985 and appointed Joseph Momoh as his successor. Momoh was accused of corruption and abuse of power, and the Revolutionary United Front (RUF) was formed later in the decade with the aim of overthrowing him. Sponsored by Liberia, the RUF began attacking settlements along the border in 1991 and quickly took control of the diamond mines, whose products they smuggled through Liberia and traded for weapons. The following years saw a series of coups and interventions by private military companies, Nigeria, the Economic Community of West African States, and the United Nations (UN), while a bloody civil war devastated the country.

On 7 July 1999, the Lomé Peace Accord was signed. Among other provisions, the agreement mandated an immediate ceasefire between the main parties to the civil war and the disarmament of the Sierra Leone Army (SLA) and the RUF. It also gave the RUF status as a legitimate political party, a role in the Sierra Leone Government, and four of the twenty-two seats in the cabinet. Foday Sankoh, leader of the RUF, was given responsibility for the diamond mines—an appointment much criticised by observers and the international media given the RUF's history of diamond smuggling. However, Peter Hain, Minister of State for Africa, suggested that the British government had no choice but to endorse the Lomé agreement given the RUF's dominance, and that the only alternative was continued civil war. A military intervention by the United Kingdom in 1999 was ruled out as the British government had received no request for military assistance and felt it lacked the backing of the international community for a unilateral intervention. An intervention was also deemed to be politically and militarily impractical given the British military's involvement with NATO operations in Yugoslavia.

=== Tony Blair and the British Armed Forces ===
The intervention in Sierra Leone was the fourth expeditionary operation and the second significant deployment undertaken by Her Majesty's Armed Forces under Tony Blair, who was elected as Prime Minister in 1997. The first two were relatively minor operations: a series of air strikes against Iraq in 1998 codenamed Operation Desert Fox, and a deployment of a company of Gurkhas and special forces on peacekeeping operations in East Timor in 1999. The third operation, the first major deployment under Blair, was in Kosovo in 1999, where British forces led a NATO intervention in the Kosovo War.

During the British operations in Kosovo, Blair delivered a speech in Chicago, in which he outlined his "Doctrine of the International Community". Blair advocated a greater use of humanitarian intervention—the use of armed force to protect a civilian population, rather than exclusively to protect national interests. Kosovo did not diminish Blair's belief in the use of military force for humanitarian purposes "where a strong moral case could be made", and he outlined a set of criteria for intervention. The intervention in Sierra Leone, according to Andrew M. Dorman of King's College London, "appears to embody much of the ethos contained within [the Chicago speech]".

== Previous British deployments ==
The intervention in May 2000 was the first major deployment of British forces to Sierra Leone during the civil war, but was not the first time British personnel had served there. In May 1997, a two-man training team from the British Army was sent to train SLA officers but discovered that the SLA's strength was much lower than it had reported. The government was overthrown in a coup before any training could take place. (Note: After President Kabbah was informed of the true strength of the SLA, he reduced its rice rations (each soldier received a monthly allowance of rice, commensurate with rank, in addition to their salary). The senior officers reduced the allowance of the junior ranks rather than their own, which led to a revolt in the junior ranks. The soldiers who revolted formed the Armed Forces Revolutionary Council (AFRC), which went on to overthrow the government.) Following the restoration of the elected government by the Economic Community of West African States Monitoring Group (ECOMOG) in February 1998, HMS Cornwall sailed to Freetown with food and medical supplies. Her crew assisted with infrastructure repairs and her helicopter was used to move people and supplies around Sierra Leone until she left in mid-April. As the security situation in Sierra Leone deteriorated later in the year, the Royal Air Force (RAF) conducted a non-combatant evacuation operation under the codename Operation Spartic over Christmas 1998. Approximately 80 people—predominantly British citizens, many of them staff or dependants from the British High Commission—were evacuated over two days.

In January 1999, the RUF attacked Freetown. They were pushed back to the eastern edges of the city by ECOMOG, after which HMS Norfolk was sent to offer assistance. On arrival, a team from the Department for International Development (DfID) was based on board the ship to assist the crew's efforts. Peter Penfold, the British High Commissioner—who had been evacuated to Guinea—temporarily lived on the ship before it was deemed safe for him to return to his residence in Freetown. He flew ashore on the Norfolk's helicopter for daily meetings, with a detachment of Royal Marines ensuring security. HMS Norfolk was replaced by HMS Westminster, shortly after which Penfold moved back to his residence and the Royal Marines took over security of the compound temporarily.

The fighting was eventually ended by the Lomé Peace Accord, which was signed in July 1999. The United Nations Observer Mission to Sierra Leone was replaced with the United Nations Mission in Sierra Leone (UNAMSIL), which included a force of 260 military observers. The observers were unarmed and tasked with monitoring the ceasefire mandated by the Lomé Agreement. The observer force, like UNAMSIL itself, was primarily made up of personnel from other African nations, but the United Kingdom contributed a small number of officers from the British Army and Royal Marines. In addition to the observers in Sierra Leone, personnel from the Royal Logistic Corps were serving in New York, assisting UNAMSIL with organising air-lifts to bring the mission up to its authorised strength.

== Build-up to the intervention ==
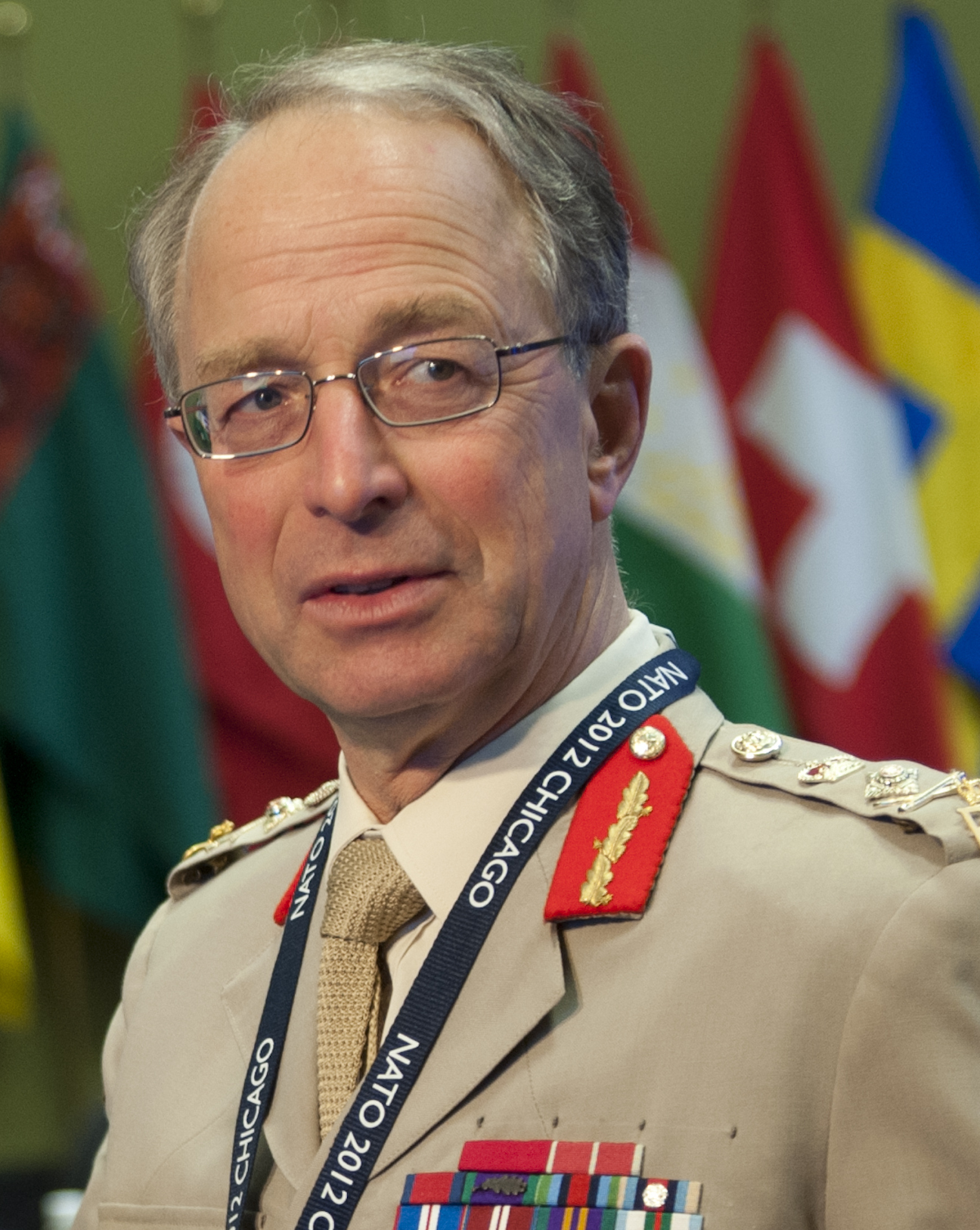
General Sir David Richards (then a brigadier) commanded British operations in Sierra Leone.

In accordance with the Lomé Agreement, UNAMSIL set up disarmament camps throughout Sierra Leone that were intended to disarm the Sierra Leone Army, the RUF, and the militia groups operating in the country. The SLA and some militia groups began to enter the camps but the RUF did not. In April 2000, 10 members of the RUF entered a UNAMSIL camp without the knowledge of the RUF's leadership. Upon locating its fighters, the RUF demanded their return. The military observers refused, and the RUF responded by besieging the camp and attacking other UNAMSIL bases in the area. They took large numbers of UN personnel prisoner, and then began to advance into areas previously controlled by the Sierra Leone government. On 3 May, the RUF took control of the town of Kambia. Foreign diplomats in the country estimated that the RUF could be in Freetown within a week, since the SLA had been confined to barracks and had handed over most of its weapons in accordance with the Lomé Agreement. The United Nations issued a statement condemning the violence, after which Secretary-General Kofi Annan told the British representative to the UN that it expected the United Kingdom, as the former colonial power, to intervene in Sierra Leone directly, rather than relying on the international community.

On 5 May 2000, the British government continued to state that it would provide only logistical and technical support to UNAMSIL, but was privately exploring its options for a military deployment. The United Kingdom had a greater level of political involvement in Sierra Leone than in any other African country and, with the country's stability deteriorating, it was reluctant to see that investment wasted. In addition, an estimated 1,000 entitled personnel (Note: "Entitled personnel", sometimes referred to as "entitled persons", are defined by the British government as: British nationals (including dual nationals); nationals of the Commonwealth, European Union, and United States as part of multi-national agreements; and other nationalities dependent on space available and guarantees from their governments to reimburse the British government for the cost of their evacuation.) were in Sierra Leone, and the government feared for their safety. Academics have since suggested that the credibility of UNAMSIL and future UN peacekeeping operations would have been at stake had the mission in Sierra Leone been allowed to fail. The British Armed Forces were not as widely deployed in 2000 as they were to be later in the decade. The British Army had two brigades serving with NATO in the Balkans, and the Ministry of Defence (MoD) had ongoing commitments to Cyprus, the Falkland Islands, and elsewhere, but the armed forces—particularly units threatened by proposed cuts to the defence budget—were keen to participate in an operation. Senior officers thus advised the government that an operation in Sierra Leone was feasible. Over the following days, there was debate within the British government as to what the aims of a military deployment to Sierra Leone would be. The Foreign and Commonwealth Office (FCO) advocated a full-scale intervention to assist UNAMSIL, arguing that a non-combatant evacuation operation would not be sufficient and would undermine the UN, but the MoD believed that the armed forces would be unable to sustain a larger-scale operation.

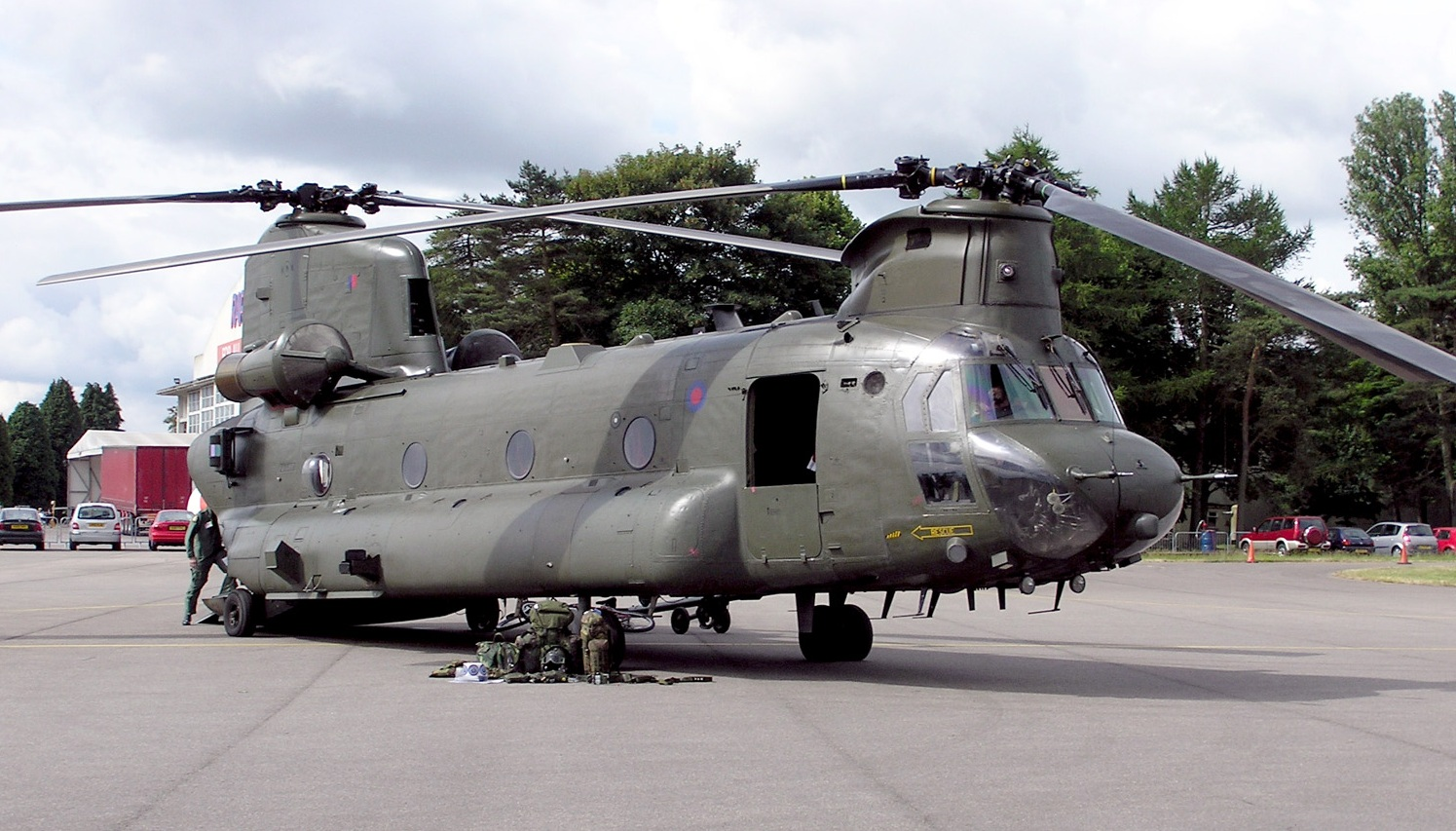
An RAF CH-47 Chinook; Chinooks were essential to the evacuation and supported later British operations in Sierra Leone, but as the RAF lacked the capacity to transport them intact, two had to fly to Freetown from the UK.

The British government's emergency committee, COBRA, (Note: COBRA is a British government committee convened to handle national crises. The committee is named after the room in which it meets—the Cabinet Office Briefing Room—and usually known as "COBRA" or "Cobra" or sometimes "COBR". Similarly to the SAS, COBRA first became known to the public during the Iranian Embassy siege.) was convened and presented with three options for an evacuation of entitled persons—deployment of aircraft and special forces to conduct an evacuation via Lungi airport, deployment of regular ground forces for a similar operation, or re-routing the Amphibious Ready Group (ARG). (Note: The ARG is an amphibious force based around a Royal Marine commando (similar in size to an infantry battalion) with supporting assets.) COBRA concluded that it lacked sufficient information to recommend one of the three options and instructed the MoD to continue to develop them, while also recommending that an "operational reconnaissance and liaison team" (ORLT) be sent to Sierra Leone to assess the situation and advise on how the military could be useful. The Prime Minister, Tony Blair, approved the ORLT, which was led by Brigadier David Richards, Chief of Joint Force Operations. Richards had previously visited Sierra Leone twice during the civil war—first on HMS Norfolk in early 1999 and again in early 2000—and was familiar with the political leadership of the country. He and his team left from RAF Northolt eight hours later accompanied by a close protection force, and arrived in Freetown in the early hours of 6 May. The ORLT established itself in the British High Commission in Freetown, where daily political–military coordination meetings were held throughout the operation.

The readiness of several other assets was heightened on 5 May. Two Royal Navy vessels—the aircraft carrier HMS Illustrious and the frigate HMS Argyll—were ordered to sail to the area, as was the ARG (which had been on exercise in southern France). The standby special forces squadron and 1st Battalion, Parachute Regiment (1 PARA), were both ordered to prepare for a potential operation in Sierra Leone; and several RAF transport aircraft were taken off other duties and ordered to be prepared to airlift special forces and/or 1 PARA to Lungi airport. At the same time, four RAF CH-47 Chinooks were ordered to deploy to Sierra Leone—two from the Balkans and two from their base in the United Kingdom. The RAF lacked aircraft large enough to transport Chinooks and so the helicopter crews flew themselves to Freetown. The 3,000-mile (4,800 km) flight undertaken by the two aircraft based in the UK was the longest self-deployment of helicopters in British history. (Note: The RAF later acquired six C-17 Globemasters for large airlifts.)

== Operation Palliser ==
On 6 May 2000, the RUF blocked the road connecting Freetown to Lungi Airport, prompting UNAMSIL staff to evacuate to the Mamy Yoko Hotel in preparation for a total withdrawal from Sierra Leone if the RUF advance continued towards Freetown. In response to the deterioration Richards requested that British troops be sent to Dakar, Senegal, to decrease the time required to launch an operation in Sierra Leone. Richards also spoke to the 1 PARA command to update them on the situation. Following the conversation, 1 PARA (with 2 PARA's D Company replacing A Company, who were on exercise in Jamaica, and with several attached assets including artillery) moved to the Air Movements Centre in South Cerney, Gloucestershire. The following day Richards was designated Joint Task Force Commander and his ORLT became the forward headquarters for a British deployment. At the same time, the authority to launch an evacuation operation was delegated to Richards and the British High Commissioner, Alan Jones.

With the RUF rapidly advancing on Freetown and controlling most of the interior of Sierra Leone, the only means of rapidly evacuating entitled persons or reinforcing UNAMSIL was by air via Lungi airport. Thus, the enhanced 1 PARA was flown to Dakar on 7 May, where C Company and the special forces squadron were almost immediately put aboard RAF Hercules C-130s with orders to secure the airport. They arrived at Lungi before sunset and were joined by the remaining elements of 1 PARA the next morning. The soldiers were able to deploy rapidly and with minimal equipment, knowing that they would not have to wait long for the ARG's reinforcements and supplies should they be needed. The soldiers immediately set about securing the areas that would be vital to an evacuation, including the Mamy Yoko hotel, which became the evacuation centre, and Lungi airport. Jones requested in the afternoon of 8 May that Richards commence the evacuation—codenamed Operation Palliser—which Richards did almost immediately. Entitled persons who wished to leave were instructed to assemble at the Mamy Yoko hotel. From there, they would be helicoptered to the airport by Chinooks and then flown to Dakar.

Over the course of a week, British forces evacuated approximately 500 entitled persons from Sierra Leone—almost 300 of whom left in the first two days of the operation. The arrival of British soldiers boosted morale in the country, and many foreign citizens opted to stay. The operation took on a slower pace after the first two days, but personnel and aircraft remained ready to evacuate any entitled persons who had been unable to reach Freetown earlier and to evacuate the British High Commission if the security situation deteriorated.

== Mission expansion ==
In Westminster, the three government departments concerned with the British role in Sierra Leone—the MoD, the FCO, and DfID—struggled to agree on the objectives of the military deployment beyond the evacuation, which led to delays in issuing orders. Richards did not receive precise instructions until after Operation Palliser had commenced, and rules of engagement (ROEs) were not issued before the start of the operation. Commanders defaulted to the ROEs used in Northern Ireland, their most recent relevant experience.

With the evacuation largely complete, the British government turned its attention to the four British United Nations Military Observers (UNMOs) being held by the RUF. British forces in Freetown helped facilitate the escape of four UNMOs (three British and one from New Zealand) from a UNAMSIL camp in Makeni, which had been besieged by the RUF since ten RUF fighters had been accepted into the disarmament process. After consulting with the British command in Freetown, the four officers left the camp and covertly passed the RUF line before trekking west. They arrived at the UN base at Mile 91 almost 24 hours later, and an RAF Chinook picked them up and flew them to Freetown. No longer having the unarmed observers to protect, the Kenyan UNAMSIL detachment at Makeni fought their way out of the siege and proceeded west to join other UNAMSIL forces. With the three British officers from Makeni freed, only one British UNMO—Major Andy Harrison—remained a prisoner of the RUF, and the British government began discreetly attempting to establish his location. Harrison and ten other UNMOs had initially been held by the RUF at the latter's base until Harrison convinced the RUF to allow the observers to join the Indian UNAMSIL contingent in Kailahun.

In addition to the missing UNMOs, the British government faced political and diplomatic problems. The deployment of British troops to Sierra Leone had lifted morale and halted the RUF advance on Freetown, and there were concerns that violence would resume once the British left. Another consequence of the British operation was that it effectively sidelined UNAMSIL. The United Nations and several of the contributing nations to UNAMSIL applied pressure on the British government to integrate its forces into UNAMSIL, but the MoD lacked faith in the competence of UNAMSIL headquarters and was unwilling to place its troops under UNAMSIL command. The MoD was also reluctant to deploy the brigade-sized force necessary to take command of UNAMSIL, given the armed forces' commitments elsewhere, and thus the British force in Sierra Leone remained outside UNAMSIL. The British government was also reluctant to commit British troops to an open-ended peacekeeping operation, especially given the opposition in the House of Commons—particularly from the Conservative Party—to the initial deployment to Sierra Leone, and accusations from the British media of "mission creep". By contrast, the operation was well-received on the international stage, and met with the approval of the UN Security Council.

On 12 May, Baroness Symons, a junior minister in the MoD, told the House of Lords that British forces would remain in Sierra Leone, mainly to ensure the security of Lungi airport while UNAMSIL brought in reinforcements. Soldiers also remained at the evacuation point in Freetown to ensure its security, while others patrolled the streets of Freetown in an attempt to reassure residents. HMS Illustrious, with her air group, and the ARG both arrived on 14 May, bringing the number of British personnel in the operational area to approximately 4,500. Harriers from Illustrious began flying reassurance patrols over Freetown and the ARG supplemented British firepower, particularly at Lungi, with the provision of artillery. In the field, the British forces divided their efforts between three lines of operation: support to UNAMSIL, support to the SLA, and preparation to provide humanitarian assistance, should it be necessary, though the expanded mandate only became formal government policy several days later. During the following week, the RUF began to remobilise in the north of the country. The UN and the Sierra Leonean government feared that UNAMSIL troops between the RUF and Freetown might not be able to stand up to an assault by the RUF, and so the RAF Chinooks—in the country to conduct the evacuation—were used to ferry reinforcements from Lungi as they arrived. Meanwhile, President Ahmad Kabbah formed an alliance of militia groups (including the self-styled Civil Defence Force and the West Side Boys) and the remnants of the SLA, totalling around 6,000 personnel, to assist UNAMSIL forces in blocking the RUF advance. The British also provided reconnaissance for UNAMSIL using ground-based signals and intelligence personnel and special forces as well as flights by Harriers and a Nimrod R1.

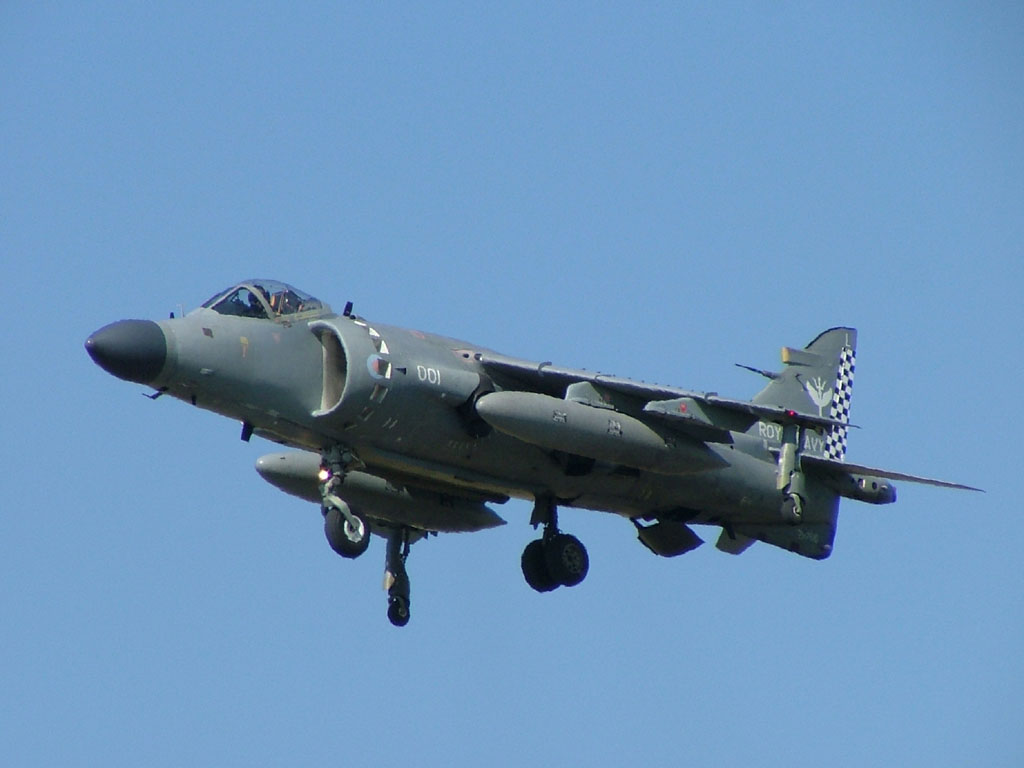
A Sea Harrier; Harriers were used for reconnaissance and reassurance during the British intervention.

The RUF continued to advance, resulting in sporadic confrontations with UNAMSIL and government forces, until on 17 May they came into direct contact with British forces. The Pathfinder Platoon had stationed itself at Lungi Lol, a village 12 miles (19 km) north of Freetown close to Lungi airport, and shortly after were confronted by a group of RUF members. The resulting series of firefights lasted several hours, after which the RUF withdrew, having suffered 30 casualties. According to Richards, the British success in the confrontation provided an "immense" psychological victory and a deterrent against further attacks. Foday Sankoh, leader of the RUF, was captured later the same day by forces loyal to President Kabbah and handed over to the Sierra Leone Police, but had to be evacuated by an RAF Chinook after a hostile crowd gathered outside the building in which he was held. Sankoh's capture created a power vacuum at the top of the RUF and the subsequent in-fighting provided an opportunity for the MoD to order a rotation of forces deployed in Sierra Leone. The 1 PARA battlegroup was ordered back to the United Kingdom to resume its spearhead role as the permanent stand-by battalion that would form the basis of any emergency deployment, while 42 Commando, Royal Marines, came ashore to replace the soldiers.

In Whitehall, the British government laid out its longer-term objectives for the military intervention in Sierra Leone on 23 May. These were: to establish sustainable peace and security in Sierra Leone, to support UNAMSIL operations, to prevent another humanitarian disaster in Freetown, to see the release of captive UN personnel, and finally to avoid British casualties and devise an exit strategy that avoided "mission creep" without undermining UNAMSIL or the Sierra Leonean government.

== Operation Khukri ==
The British government was particularly keen to secure the release of Major Andy Harrison—the last British UNMO being held by the RUF. Harrison's contingent of UNMOs was protected by an Indian Army detachment. The Indian Army's 8th Gorkha Rifles—attached to UNAMSIL—were under siege by the RUF at their base in Kailahun. The British and Indian commands in Sierra Leone had devised a plan to extract the UNMOs. British special forces remained in the country, ready to carry it out, but the UN and the British command feared that the RUF would retaliate against other UNAMSIL forces they had besieged if the UNMOs were extracted. Thus, Major-General Vijay Kumar Jetley, then serving as the commander of UNAMSIL, was allowed to continue negotiations for the release of the other besieged UNAMSIL contingents.

When the last besieged garrison (aside from Kailahun) was evacuated on 30 May, preparations for a military extraction—should Jetley's negotiations fail—began to increase. The operation (codenamed Operation Khukri) was eventually launched on 10 July. Two RAF Chinooks transported Indian special forces to the outskirts of Kailahun. The helicopters returned to Freetown with Harrison, his fellow UNMOs, and several Gurkhas who had been wounded during the siege. Harrison was safely extracted and the 600 Gurkhas fought their way out of Kailahun, suffering one casualty in the process.

== Training the SLA ==
The British government had decided that the RUF could not be trusted, and would have to be confronted and forced to enter the UN's Disarmament, Demobilisation, and Reintegration (DDR) process. They assessed that there were three options available to achieve this—to deploy British forces against the RUF, for UNAMSIL to expand its operations and confront the RUF, or for the Sierra Leonean government to use loyal forces (the SLA, former SLA personnel, the Armed Forces Revolutionary Council, and several other militia groups) to take on the RUF. Richards estimated that a British deployment against the RUF would require at least a brigade-sized force (in excess of 5,000 troops). Nevertheless, British forces' involvement in Sierra Leone was politically unpopular in Westminster and the MoD could not assemble such a force while maintaining its commitments elsewhere, so the use of British forces to directly confront the RUF was ruled out. Also ruled out was a UNAMSIL-led confrontation. Although UNAMSIL's mandate would have allowed it to enter into combat with the RUF, the national contingents were reluctant to leave their bases and its focus remained on peacekeeping rather than the peace enforcement that the British and others believed was necessary.

This left the SLA and the alliance of militia groups—which became known as the "Unholy Alliance", and was directed by a "Joint Military Committee"—the only forces capable of confronting the RUF. The SLA had been disarmed through the UN's DDR process; to restructure it and allow it to re-arm, the UN lifted its arms embargo on Sierra Leone, and the British forces began advising and training the SLA. An international team had been planned to deploy to Sierra Leone to assist the SLA with longer-term development and democratic accountability, and a British Short-Term Training Team (STTT) deployed simultaneously to improve the SLA's infantry skills. The STTT mission was codenamed Operation Basilica and based at the Benguema Training Centre, an abandoned barracks near Waterloo that had been refurbished for the purpose. The first unit to take on the role was based around 2nd Battalion, The Royal Anglian Regiment, and comprised approximately 250 personnel, including 45 instructors and a force protection company. The Anglians arrived at Benguema on 15 June to train 1,000 SLA recruits, and the ARG withdrew. The training at Benguema included instruction on the Geneva Convention, unit cohesiveness, and other skills and knowledge to build the SLA into a professional army.

Despite the British training, the SLA was not large enough or strong enough to enter into combat with the RUF while also holding the ground it had recaptured, so the British persuaded UNAMSIL to move forward behind the advancing SLA to defend its recaptured ground. Additional British liaison officers were attached to UNAMSIL, and the British facilitated a daily coordination meeting for SLA and UNAMSIL commanders, while also assisting the UN forces in drawing up a campaign plan.

== Operation Barras ==
The Anglians were replaced by a detachment of 1st Battalion, The Royal Irish Regiment, formed around C Company. On 25 August, a patrol from the Royal Irish went to visit a militia group known as the West Side Boys (WSB). At the village of Magbeni, where the WSB were based, the Royal Irish were overpowered and taken captive. British officers undertook negotiations with the WSB, leading to the release of five of the eleven soldiers on 31 August.

On 9 September, the WSB's spokesman stated that the remaining six members of the patrol, who had now been held for over a fortnight, would only be released after a new government was formed in Sierra Leone, leading negotiators to conclude that the increasingly unrealistic demands were stalling tactics rather than a serious attempt to conclude the crisis. At around the same time, teams that had been observing the West Side Boys' base for four days reported that they had seen no sign of the captive soldiers in that time. There were also concerns that an assault would become more dangerous if the West Side Boys moved the hostages. The combination of these factors led COBRA to order an extraction mission.

The mission, codenamed Operation Barras, was undertaken by D Squadron of 22 Special Air Service Regiment, who assaulted the village of Gberi Bana to extract the soldiers, while a company group formed around A Company, 1 PARA, assaulted Magbeni, on the opposite side of Rokel Creek. The operation was successful and all the British captives were extracted, along with their SLA liaison and 22 Sierra Leonean civilians, while the WSB were defeated as a military force. A British soldier and at least 25 West Side Boys were killed in the operation. Many other West Side Boys fled and later surrendered to Jordanian peacekeepers. The Jordanians had received 30 by the end of the day, and 371—including 57 children—had surrendered within a fortnight. Some of those who surrendered went on to volunteer for the new Sierra Leone Army, and those who were accepted went into the British-run training programme at Benguema. Following Operation Barras, two SLA battalions—graduates of the British short-term training programme—swept the area surrounding the West Side Boys' camp to clear it of any remaining gang members.

The risks of Operation Barras were acknowledged by the MoD and by officers involved in the planning and the assault. It was described by an SAS soldier as "not a clinical, black balaclava, Princes Gate type operation. It was a very grubby, green operation with lots of potential for things to go wrong". Despite the risks, Richard Connaughton observed in Small Wars & Insurgencies that the operation showed the Blair government was not averse to the possibility of casualties when they felt the cause was just. During the crisis and its immediate aftermath, the British government came under pressure from opposition politicians to end the deployment to Sierra Leone, and Dorman suggested that the success or failure of Operation Barras was "inextricably linked" to the fate of the wider British operation. He suggested that, had the British forces been defeated, the United Kingdom would have been forced to withdraw all its forces from Sierra Leone.

== Confronting the RUF ==
The capture of the Royal Irish patrol reinforced to the British government that its efforts so far—and those of the international community—would not be sufficient to bring the civil war to an end. In Westminster, meanwhile, opposition politicians renewed their objection to the continued presence of British forces in Sierra Leone. The government was seeking an exit strategy that would end a politically unpopular deployment without abandoning Sierra Leone.

In August 2000, the United Nations Security Council passed Resolution 1313, which blamed the RUF for the continuing conflict in Sierra Leone, citing multiple breaches of the Lomé Peace Accord. The resolution authorised an increase in the size of UNAMSIL and strengthened its mandate, which prompted the UN to once again apply pressure to the British government for a troop contribution. Several countries were reluctant to send their own troops to Sierra Leone without contributions from Western nations, and felt that the United Kingdom in particular should be contributing to the UN mission.

Despite the political pressure, the MoD continued to lack confidence in UNAMSIL leadership. Thus, the British government refused to place combat troops under UN command, but did second additional staff officers to UNAMSIL, to the UN headquarters in New York, and to the SLA. The officers attached to UNAMSIL were tasked with assisting its commanders in planning and mounting operations and were led by a brigadier who became UNAMSIL's chief of staff, while in New York, the officers attached to UN headquarters provided planning support for logistics operations to bring UNAMSIL up to its mandated strength. At the same time, the focus of the British training programme shifted. Although six battalions had been trained, the SLA still lacked many combat support functions as well as command and control capabilities. The STTTs set out to improve the SLA's capabilities in these areas by providing the next set of recruits with more specialised training in addition to basic infantry training provided to the first intake. The British trainers also constructed an operations room at the SLA's headquarters and provided other support to improve the SLA's communications and logistical capabilities.

Resolution 1313 was a significant shift in attitude for UNAMSIL, away from its previous neutrality to support of the Sierra Leone government, a shift that made the governments of several troop-contributing nations uncomfortable. In particular, the governments of Jordan and India—two of the largest contributors, with nearly 5,000 troops between them serving with UNAMSIL—were moved to withdraw their forces. The withdrawal coincided with the end of the rainy season, after which there were fears that the RUF would resume its advance towards Freetown, and the UN and British government feared that UNAMSIL would be vulnerable. As a deterrent, the ARG was once more deployed off the coast, and was instructed to conduct amphibious landing demonstrations as a show of force.

== Ceasefire ==
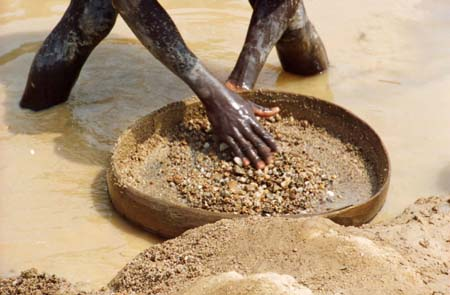
A man panning for diamonds in Sierra Leone; the exploitation of the country's diamonds inspired the terms "blood diamond" and "conflict diamond".

The RUF was coming under increasing pressure from political angles as well as from the British-trained SLA. It was heavily dependent on Sierra Leone's south-eastern neighbour Liberia, led by Charles Taylor, and derived the majority of its income from the sale of diamonds smuggled through Liberia, which became known as blood diamonds. In late 2000, the Sierra Leone government—supported by the British, UNAMSIL, and the Economic Community of West African States (ECOWAS)—entered into talks with the RUF. On 10 November, the two parties signed a 30-day ceasefire that provided for UNAMSIL to deploy throughout the entire country (it had previously been prevented from operating in many RUF-controlled areas), for the RUF to return seized weapons and equipment to UNAMSIL, and for the RUF to enter the DDR process. The ceasefire was later extended by a further 90 days. The UN Security Council embargoed Liberian diamonds in Resolution 1343 in March 2001. Shortly afterwards, the RUF began large-scale disarmament and agreed to a simultaneous disarmament with the Civil Defence Force, a militia group loyal to the government. By September, over 16,000 militia members (including around 6,500 RUF) had been through the DDR process and the combatants in the diamond-producing areas had all disarmed.

By March 2002, over 50,000 people had been through the DDR process and the RUF had been entirely disarmed. A company of Gurkhas and a Royal Navy frigate were sent to the area in March 2003 to ensure stability while several prominent people—including Charles Taylor of Liberia, cabinet minister Samuel Hinga Norman, and several former RUF leaders—were arrested and indicted by the Special Court for Sierra Leone. (Note: The Special Court for Sierra Leone was modelled on the International Criminal Court (ICC); the latter could not be used in Sierra Leone as many of the alleged war crimes occurred before the establishment of the ICC.)

The last STTT, formed around 2nd Battalion, The Light Infantry, left Sierra Leone at the end of September 2001. Approximately 8,500 SLA personnel were trained by the STTTs, which were replaced by the International Military Assistance and Training Team (IMATT)—an organisation formed of personnel from countries including Australia, Canada, and the United States, with the UK providing the largest contingent as well as an infantry company for force protection. The STTTs also formed a small special forces unit within the SLA—the Force Reconnaissance Unit (FRU)—to provide a morale boost and to give soldiers something to which they could aspire. Later in 2001, the British Army advised the Sierra Leonean government on a merger of Sierra Leone's armed forces into a unified command, which became the Republic of Sierra Leone Armed Forces in early 2002. In 2008, the permanent British contingent in Sierra Leone was reduced to 100 personnel. British soldiers remained in Sierra Leone as of 2013, continuing to form part of the IMATT, whose size has further reduced in accordance with the increased capabilities of the Sierra Leone armed forces.

== Impact ==
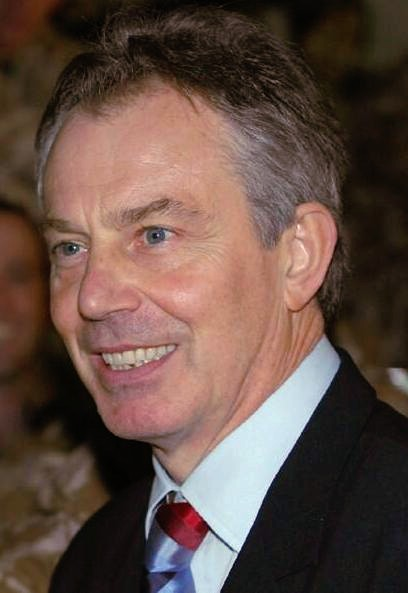
Tony Blair, then British prime minister, ordered the deployment of British forces to Sierra Leone. The humanitarian intervention in Sierra Leone was widely considered successful.

According to Penfold, who served as High Commissioner until the week before the deployment of British troops, "The fact that the major country in the region, i.e. Nigeria, and a permanent member of the UN Security Council, i.e. the UK, took an active interest was crucial in resolving the conflict". On the other hand, he believed that the international community had failed to recognise that the Sierra Leone Civil War was part of a larger conflict in the sub-region, and "it was not until the problem of Charles Taylor and Liberia was addressed that the conflict was resolved". In a later book, Penfold praised Richards' leadership of the operation, stating that it was "extremely fortunate that Operation Palliser was under the command of an officer of the calibre of David Richards, with his knowledge of the situation and his experience and commitment. David Richards knew that with the resources available he could do more than just assist an evacuation ... he realised that he could actively stabilise the situation". Richards received the Distinguished Service Order for his leadership of British forces in Sierra Leone, while several other personnel received decorations for gallantry or distinguished service.

The intervention in Sierra Leone was the fourth deployment of British forces abroad during the premiership of Tony Blair, and the largest operation undertaken by the United Kingdom alone since the Falklands War (1982). It was the second major operation of the Blair government, after Kosovo. During his remaining time in office, British forces undertook operations in Afghanistan and Iraq, but Sierra Leone was the only unilateral operation. Unlike Afghanistan and Iraq, the intervention in Sierra Leone was widely regarded as successful. It became a "benchmark" for successful expeditionary operations, and was cited by Blair in his rationale for later deployments to Afghanistan and Iraq. Success in Sierra Leone encouraged the Blair government to continue its support to Africa, particularly with regard to resolving conflicts.

Sierra Leone also encouraged Blair's policy of humanitarian intervention. Critics claimed that it led Blair to see military force as "just another foreign policy option" and that the apparent ease of the success shifted his focus towards the effectiveness of the use of force rather than the political and military risks. In his autobiography, Blair described the operation as one of the least-discussed aspects of his time in office but one of the things of which he is most proud. He was keen to intervene in other African nations where civilian populations were at risk, particularly Darfur and Zimbabwe, but a lack of political support, combined with the pressure of large deployments to Afghanistan and Iraq after the 11 September attacks on the United States, prevented further interventions in Africa. (Note: The UK did contribute logistics personnel to the African Union mission in Darfur.) It was not until 2011—when Operation Ellamy was launched as part of a multi-national intervention in Libya—that the United Kingdom undertook another military intervention in Africa.

The experience in Sierra Leone proved the effectiveness of relatively small numbers of well trained and equipped soldiers. It inspired the British government to work more closely with European allies, particularly France after the latter led Operation Artemis, a UN-mandated intervention in the Democratic Republic of Congo in 2003. After a summit in 2003, the two governments called on the European Union (EU) to develop the capability to rapidly deploy a battle group of around 1,500 personnel able to respond to crises, particularly in Africa. The member states of the EU approved the creation of 13 battle groups in 2004.

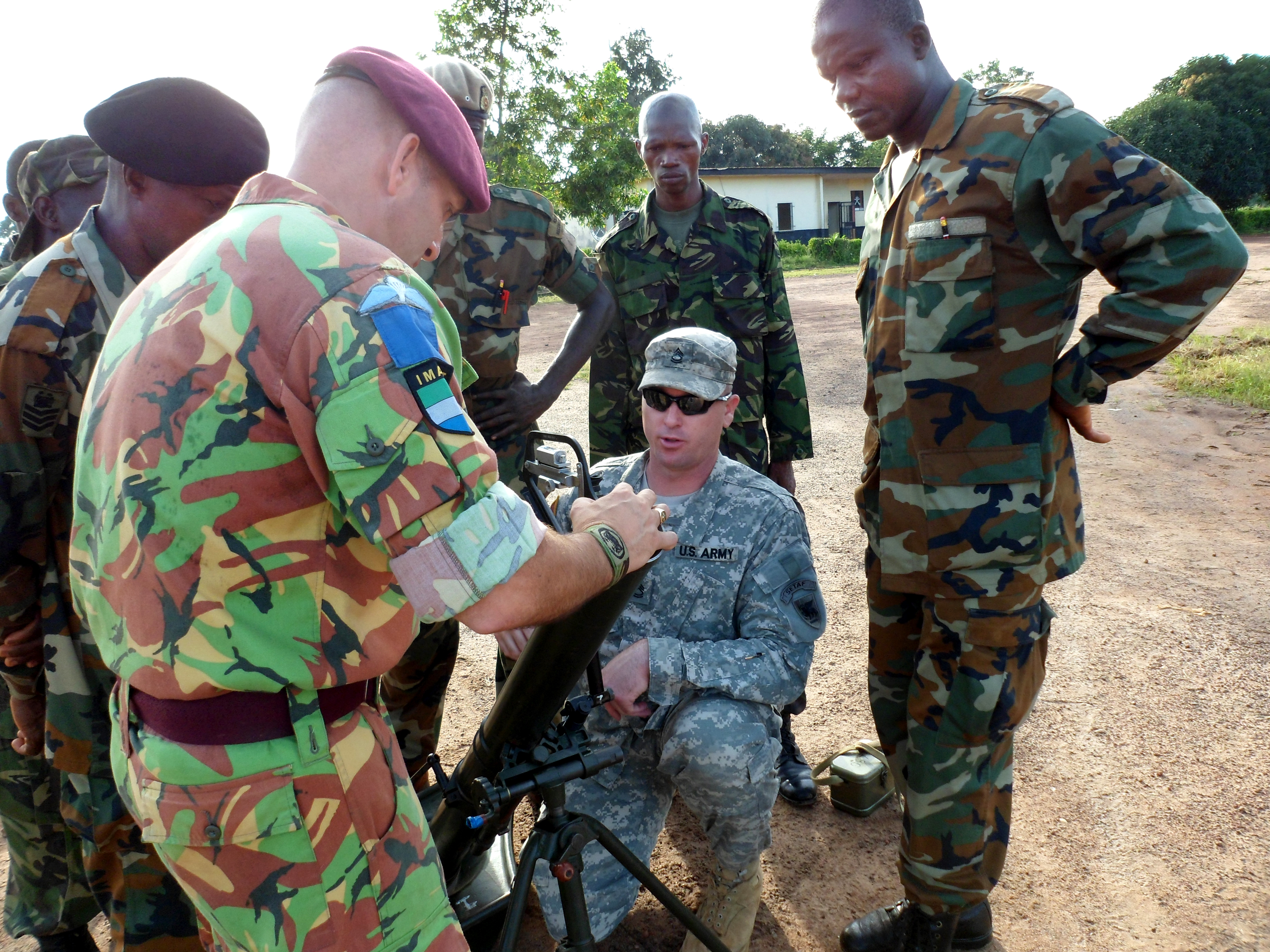
Soldiers from the British and United States armies training Sierra Leonean soldiers to use a mortar during 2011

Sierra Leone convinced Blair and his Defence Secretary Geoff Hoon of the need to alter the focus of British defence policy towards less conventional conflicts and away from more traditional wars between states. The MoD published a white paper in 2003, Delivering Security in a Changing World, which revisited aspects of the 1998 "Strategic Defence Review" (SDR). The SDR had focused on the Middle East and North Africa, and had not envisaged a need to deploy troops to sub-Saharan Africa other than for a potential non-combatant evacuation operation in Zimbabwe. Thus, the white paper recommended preparations for relatively short, intense operations against forces with inferior technology, with a particular focus on Africa.

The rapidity with which forces were required to deploy to Sierra Leone emphasised the need for the United Kingdom to retain high-readiness forces. That need also vindicated concepts such as the ARG and the spearhead battalion (the capacity in which 1 PARA was serving when it deployed), and protected 1 PARA in the 2004 review of the infantry structure. The 2004 review reduced the total number of British Army battalions from 40 to 36 and created the Special Forces Support Group (SFSG), which was inspired by the success of 1 PARA in Operation Barras. The SFSG—initially formed around 1 PARA—provides specialist capabilities or acts as a force multiplier for British special forces on large or complex operations. As the largest unilateral operation undertaken by the United Kingdom since their creation, the intervention in Sierra Leone was the first major test of the ORLT and joint task force concepts. Both were created as a result of the 1997 SDR and provide a headquarters staff at very high readiness to command an expeditionary operation at operational level. According to Richards, both were "thoroughly validated" and were vital in coordinating the large numbers of assets deployed at short notice and reporting back to the Permanent Joint Headquarters in Northwood.

A 2015 study in the Journal of Strategic Studies finds that the intervention in Sierra Leone was a success.
