= Boston Grammar School =

Grammar school in Boston, Lincolnshire, England

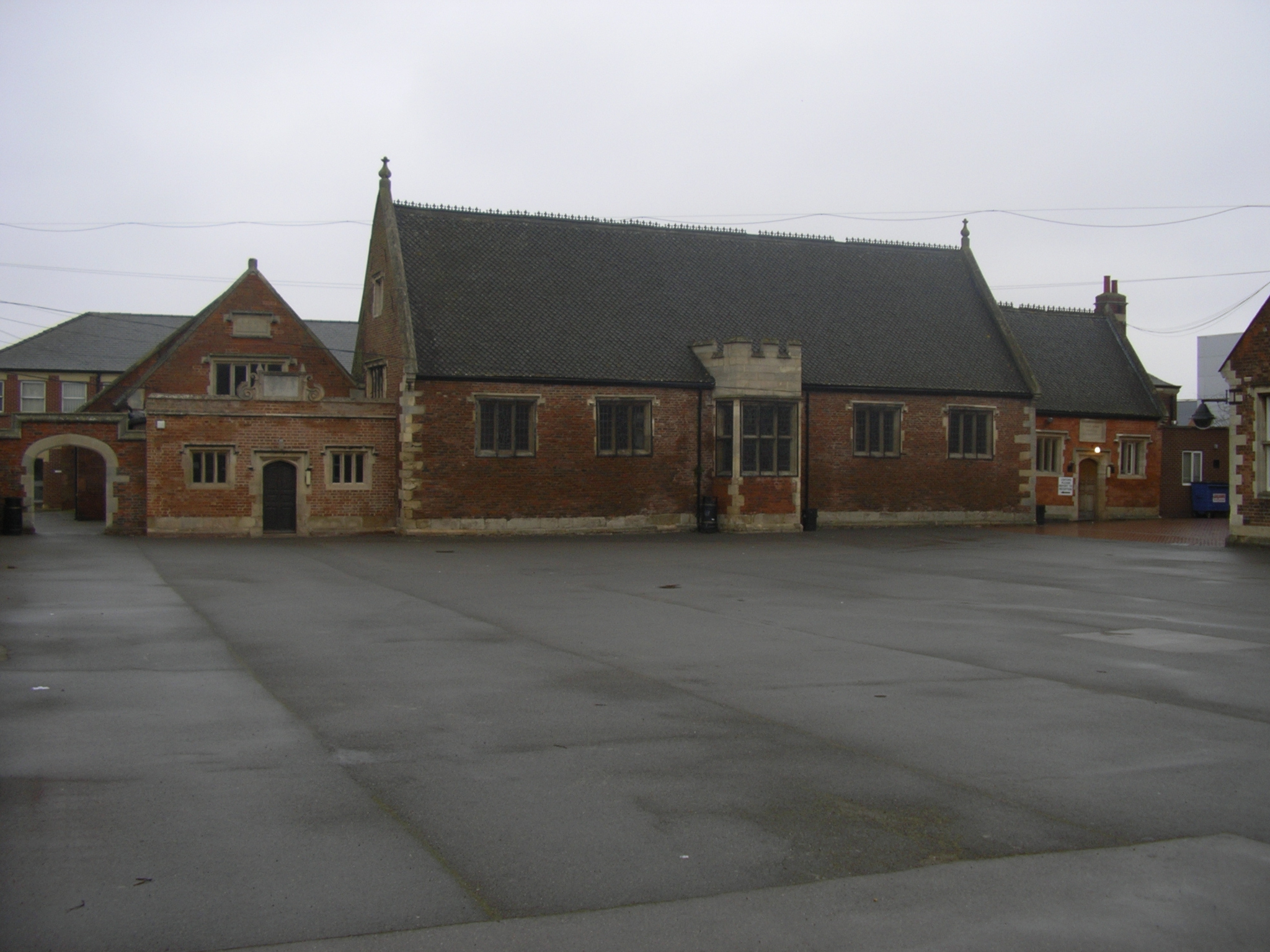
- School badge Boston Grammar School in Lincolnshire, from the west.

Location
- South End; Boston, Lincolnshire, PE21 6JY; England; 52°58′28″N 0°01′16″W

Information
- Type: 11–18 boys Grammar school; Academy
- Motto: Floreat Bostona
- Established: 1555; 471 years ago
- Founders: Philip and Mary
- Department for Education URN: 139180 Tables
- Ofsted: Reports
- Chairman of Trustees: Emma Woods
- Headteacher: John McHenry
- Gender: Boys
- Age: 11 to 18
- Enrolment: 812
- Houses: Muston; Laughton; Gannock; Parry
- Colour
- Publication: The Grammar Gazette
- Alumni: Old Bostonians
- Website: Boston Grammar School

The Boston Grammar School is an 11–18 boys selective grammar school and sixth form college located in Boston, Lincolnshire, England. By October 2021, a total of 812 pupils attending the school, 201 of which were in the sixth form provision at the school. A recent 2021 Ofsted report assessed the school overall as 'good'

== History ==
=== Establishment ===
The school was founded by charter of Philip and Mary in 1555. The oldest sections of the school were built in 1567, formerly referred to as the "big school" and now used as the school library. South End Site became the model for Boston Latin School which was the first school in what was to become the United States of America. The school still retains the Latin motto 'Floreat Bostona' (May Boston Flourish). This motto also forms the title of the official school song, written by Dr G.E. Pattenden, headmaster from 1850 to 1887, which he referred to as 'my school hymn'. The song is still sung at official school occasions such as Prizegiving, Charter Day and Beastmart.

In the 1960s when under Holland County Council Education Committee, it was a voluntary controlled school with around 620 boys. The school had a CCF.

=== Sixth form ===
Girls are now admitted to the sixth form. There were 597 pupils on the roll as at April 2008, including 170 in the sixth form. The school has been awarded Technology College and sports specialist status. In December 2012, Boston Grammar School shut its doors for the final time as a selective school, run by the local authority. In January 2013, Boston Grammar School re-opened as a selective academy.

=== Academy status ===
On 1 January 2013, Boston Grammar School became a converter academy, under the leadership of the then headteacher, Paul Marsh. No changes were made to the school uniform and the school retained its existing name. This ended the federation between Boston Grammar School and Boston High School, with both schools now having an independent governing body, budget and establishment number.

=== Federation plans ===
In 2006, there were controversial plans by Lincolnshire County Council to federate Boston Grammar School with the local girls grammar school Boston High School, with effect from September 2011. In 2010 it was announced that due to the withdrawal of Building Schools for the Future funding by the new coalition government, that both schools would operate as two separate schools, still under a federation – on two sites – with one governing body. This arrangement ended when Boston Grammar School became an academy in 2013.

== Overview ==
=== School Houses ===
There are four houses in the school named after important figures in the school's history. Each is associated with a different colour which is reflected in different coloured ties, and boys are assigned to a house when they join the school on an arbitrary basis in order to create different groups for school activities, including Sports Day.

Laughton –
John Laughton left a bequest to the local bluecoat school. On its closure this was subsequently given to the grammar school

Muston –
Robert De Muston was the first schoolmaster of Boston in 1329.

Gannock –
William Gannock was the Mayor of Boston at the time the school was built on its current site in 1567.

Parry –
Thomas Parry the Liberal MP for Boston who in 1875 gave a gold medal to the scholar of the year. This medal is still awarded to the student who attains the best A-level results each year.

=== Beast Mart ===
Beast Mart is an annual half-day holiday, awarded to boys to commemorate the annual cattle market that took place traditionally in the school yard (the Beast Yard). The Beast Mart declaration takes place one day in December each year. The Council Chief Executive (in place of the historical Town Clerk) reads the declaration of the Beast Mart and the Mayor requests that the headmaster give the school a half-day holiday. The head of school then leads three cheers to the King and the Mayor calling "hip, hip, hip!"

=== Charter Day ===
A celebration of the granting of the school charter takes place annually at St Botolph's Church, Boston, (known locally as Boston Stump). During this celebration the school song is traditionally sung.

=== Prizegiving ===
An annual prizegiving ceremony is held in December of each year. During this event a number of awards recognising achievement in academic disciplines, sport and other areas are awarded. Old boys are often in attendance, including the previous year's A-level students who return to receive their A-level certificates. The Parry Gold Medal is awarded to the student who achieved the best A-level results. A guest speaker is always invited, and notable guests of honour have included Helen Sharman, Barry Spikings and Mark Simmonds MP.

== Notable formers ==
=== Pupils ===
- George Bass – surgeon and explorer (likely)
- Cyril Bland – cricketer
- Brian Bolland – comics artist
- Richard Budge – former head of RJB Mining, and his older brother Tony, founder of the A.F. Budge construction company
- Joseph Langley Burchnall – mathematician
- Danny Butterfield – footballer
- Bernard Codd – professional motorcycle road racer
- John Cridland – former Director General of the Confederation of British Industry
- Bill Dunham – former Deputy Commandant General of the Royal Marines
- Victor Emery – physicist
- George Edward Hale Enderby – anaesthetist, who developed Hypotensive anaesthesia using an Oscillotonometer to measure low blood pressure
- Simon Garner – footballer (Blackburn Rovers F.C.)
- Arthur James Grant – historian
- John Hallam – Canon of Windsor
- Wyn Harness (1971–78) – former assistant editor, and a founder of The Independent
- Michael Horne FRS, structural engineer
- Carl Hudson – Musician (Keyboard player for Professor Green)
- Richard Hurst – writer and director
- John Leverett – former governor of Massachusetts (likely)
- Rev Dr John Newton CBE – former president of the Methodist Conference, former President of The Wesley Historical Society
- T. William Olle – computer scientist
- Simon Patrick – Bishop of Ely from 1691 to 1707
- Mike Pinner – footballer (Manchester United F.C.)
- Philip Priestley (1957–64) – former High Commissioner to Belize (2001–04)
- Oliver Ryan – footballer (ex Lincoln City footballer)
- Rt Rev Frank Pilkington Sargeant – Bishop at Lambeth from 1994 to 1999 and Bishop of Stockport from 1984 to 1994
- Barry Spikings – Hollywood producer
- Ernest Stewart Roberts, Vice-Chancellor from 1906 to 1908 of the University of Cambridge
- Ray Tinkler – football referee
- Jonathan Van-Tam MBE (1976–82) – Deputy Chief Medical Officer for England
- David Ward – former Lib Dem MP for Bradford East (2010–2015)
- Oswald Wardell-Yerburgh – clergyman
- Scott Williams – professional darts player

=== Notable staff ===
- James Dyson, headmaster 1912–1919

== See also ==
- List of English and Welsh endowed schools (19th century)
- List of the oldest schools in the United Kingdom
