= Alan Jones (diplomat) =

British diplomat

High Commissioner to Belize
- In office 2004–2007
- Monarch: Elizabeth II
- Preceded by: Philip Priestley
- Succeeded by: John Yapp

High Commissioner to Sierra Leone
- In office May 2000 – 2003
- Monarch: Elizabeth II
- Preceded by: Peter Penfold
- Succeeded by: John Mitchiner

Personal details
- Born: 26 October 1953 (age 72)

David Alan Jones (born 26 October 1953) is a retired British diplomat who was High Commissioner to Sierra Leone during the British military intervention in the Sierra Leone Civil War.

== Career ==
Jones joined the Lord Chancellor's Department in 1970 before transferring to the Foreign and Commonwealth Office (FCO) the following year. His first overseas posting was to Tehran in 1975. After three years in Iran, he was posted to Islamabad, Pakistan, in 1978. After a further three years, he was seconded to the Ministry of Defence (MoD) for two years. In 1986, he was promoted to First Secretary (Commercial) in Cairo, where he served until 1989. In 1993, he was promoted to consul and deputy head of mission in Luanda, Angola. In 1996, after three years in Angola, Jones was posted to Dar es Salaam, Tanzania, where he served as Deputy High Commissioner.

After four years in Dar es Salaam, Jones was appointed High Commissioner to Sierra Leone, succeeding Peter Penfold in early May 2000. In a double hatted appointment, he served concurrently as non-resident Ambassador to Guinea. On 6 May 2000—less than a week into Jones' term in Sierra Leone—rebel fighters belonging to the Revolutionary United Front (RUF) blocked the road connecting the capital, Freetown, to the country's main airport, Lungi. The following day, British forces deployed to the country in preparation for an evacuation of foreign citizens. Jones—who had been delegated political authority over the operation—ordered the commencement of the evacuation the next day (8 May), and it began almost immediately. British forces then went on to conduct a large-scale intervention, aimed at ending the civil war and assisting the United Nations peacekeeping force in the country. Nine days into their deployment (17 May), British forces were involved in what became their only direct engagement with the RUF, the Lungi Lol confrontation, in which the rebels engaged British soldiers who were securing the airport. Later in Jones' term, in September 2000, a group of 11 British soldiers were taken prisoner by a militia group. Five soldiers were eventually released through negotiation, but—as concerns for the remaining six mounted—Jones was granted political authority to order a rescue operation in an emergency. The soldiers were later freed in Operation Barras, an assault spearheaded by British special forces.

Jones continued to serve in both posts until 2003, and in 2004 was appointed High Commissioner to Belize, succeeding Philip Priestley.
