= Rothwell, Lincolnshire =

Village in Lincolnshire, England

Coordinates: 53.478737°N 0.267623°W

Rothwell
- Location within Lincolnshire
- Population: 226 (2011)
- OS grid reference: TF151995
  - London: 135 mi (217 km) S
- Civil parish: Rothwell
- District: West Lindsey
- Shire county: Lincolnshire
- Region: East Midlands
- Country: England
- Sovereign state: United Kingdom
- Post town: MARKET RASEN
- Postcode district: LN7
- Dialling code: 01472
- Police: Lincolnshire
- Fire: Lincolnshire
- Ambulance: East Midlands
- UK Parliament: Gainsborough

Rothwell is a small village and civil parish in the district of West Lindsey in north-east Lincolnshire, England. The population of the civil parish at the 2011 census was 226. The village is situated approximately 2.5 miles (4.0 km) south-east from Caistor and 9 miles (14 km) north from Market Rasen. It is 2 miles (3.2 km) east of the Viking Way. The parish covers just over 2,870 acres (11.6 km^{2}) and is primarily agricultural land.

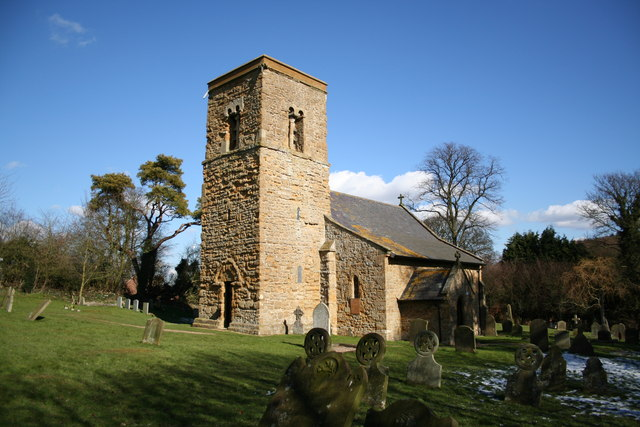
St Mary Magdalene Church

Rothwell's medieval church is dedicated to St Mary Magdalene. The Blacksmith's Arms, formerly the Nickerson Arms, was the village public house – it was situated on Hill Rise. Nickerson Seeds, owned by the EU's largest seed company Groupe Limagrain, is based in the village.

== Notable people ==
Joseph Nickerson founder of Nickerson Seeds, after whom the village pub was named
