= Wyn Harness =

- Born: 1 February 1960; Boston, Lincolnshire
- Died: 3 October 2007 (aged 47); Hove
- Years active: 1978–2006
- Spouse: Sue Royal

Wyn Harness (1960–2007) was a journalist at The Independent from the newspaper's creation in 1986.

== Life ==
Harness was born in 1960 in Boston, where he attended Boston Grammar School. He was the youngest child of Ray and Freda Harness.

Wyn married Sue Royal in 1998; with whom he had two children.

He died aged 47 of a brain tumour.

== Career ==
At the age of 18 he began his career as a journalist, working at the Lincolnshire Standard from 1978. From there he joined The Brighton Argus in 1982, where he stayed until 1986. Harness joined The Independent before it was launched, and was the first layout sub-editor. During his time at The Independent he took several sub-editorial roles until he became the chief sub-editor. He later became the assistant editor of The Independent and the Independent on Sunday, where he remained until he left the paper due to ill health in 2006.

== The Wyn Harness prize ==
The annual Wyn Harness prize for young journalists was created by The Independent in his memory.
