= The Story Museum =

Museum in Oxford, England

Coordinates: 51.7506957°N 1.2579296°W

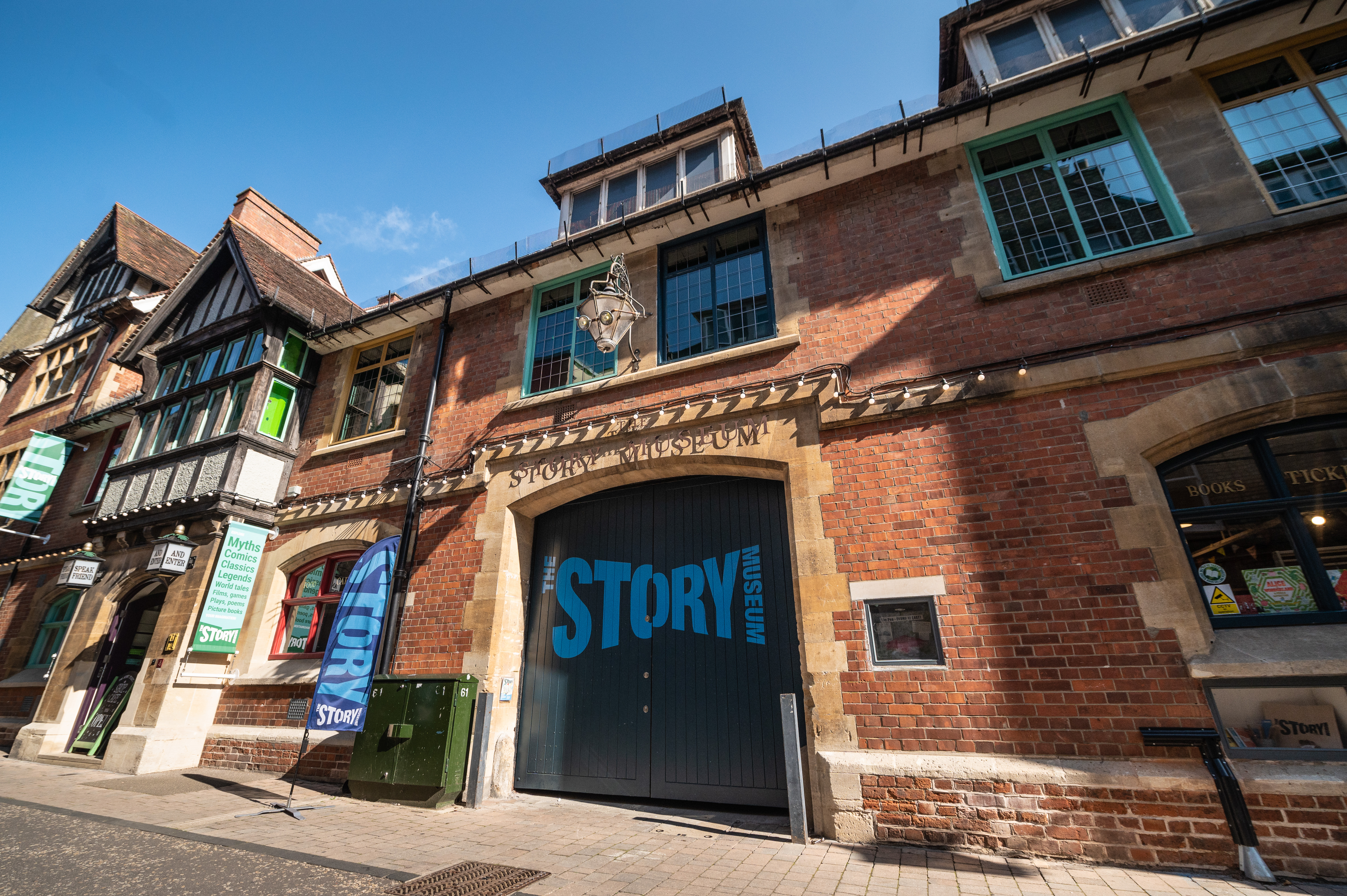
The Story Museum's Courtyard (south side). This section of the building was previously a telephone exchange and a pub, the steel hoist and first floor door are from occasions when telephony equipment was brought in.

The Story Museum is a museum in Oxford, England. It aims to encourage education and support community engagement by exploring all forms of stories. It is a registered charity under English law.

Highlights include a Whispering Wood, an Enchanted Library and Small Worlds, a dedicated space for younger children as well as a 100-seat theatre, a learning studio and a temporary exhibition space. In addition to welcoming public visitors and school groups to its Galleries, the Museum also delivers an extensive public programme, including skills courses, workshops, drop-in activities and access visits for those wanting to enjoy the Museum in a more relaxed way, alongside a programme of funded community and school participation projects with targeted groups. The Museum attracts up to 100,000 visitors a year.

== History ==
The museum was founded in 2003 and initially operated as a virtual museum with no premises of its own.

In November 2009, it was announced that the museum would move to premises at Rochester House in Pembroke Street, following a gift of £2.5m from a private donor. The museum closed for a major £6 million redevelopment on 7 July 2018, with funding including a £1 million grant from the Heritage Lottery Fund in 2015, and a £2 million grant from Arts Council England. The renovation was completed in 2020.

In 2026, the museum launched 1001 Stories, a free online story collection and learning resource for families, educators and young people, as part of the UK’s National Year of Reading.

== See also ==
- Roald Dahl Museum and Story Centre
- Museum of Oxford
- Seven Stories
- List of books about Oxford
- Society for Storytelling
- Ministry of Stories
- 826 Valencia
