= New Africa Analysis =

- Editor: Charles Davies
- Categories: News magazine
- Frequency: Fortnightly
- Founded: 2008
- Country: UK
- Language: English
- Website: New Africa Analysis
- ISSN: 1759-9490
- OCLC: 310424170

New Africa Analysis is an African news and current affairs publication based in the U.K., and distributed in the UK and South Africa. The publication consists of a fortnightly magazine and a website.

== Editorial position ==
The publication claims to report on news relating to Africa in a progressive manner.

== List of editors and contributors ==
The current editor is Charles Davies, a British/Sierra Leonean journalist, former Editor of the Christian Monitor newspaper.

The editorial board includes Peter Penfold, former British High Commissioner to Sierra Leone, Val Collier, former head of Sierra Leone's Anti Corruption Commission Notable contributors have included South African novelist and critic Brent Meersman.
