= Stanley Fingland =

British diplomat

Sir Stanley James Gunn Fingland KCMG (19 December 1919 – 20 January 2003) was a British diplomat who was High Commissioner to Sierra Leone, Ambassador to Cuba and High Commissioner to Kenya.

== Career ==
Stanley James Gunn Fingland was educated at the Royal High School, Edinburgh. He joined the Civil Service in 1936 at the age of 17, initially in the Post Office During the Second World War he served with the Royal Signals in North Africa, Sicily, Italy and Egypt, earning a mention in dispatches and rising to the rank of major. He joined the Commonwealth Relations Office in 1948 and served with the High Commission in India and the embassy in Australia before being posted as Adviser on Commonwealth and External Affairs to the Governor-General of Nigeria 1958–60. After Nigeria gained its independence from the United Kingdom on 1 October 1960 Fingland served briefly at the new High Commission there before being posted to the West Indies Federation to do a similar advisory job; after Trinidad and Tobago gained their independence in 1962 he was Deputy High Commissioner until the following year.

In 1964 Fingland was posted to Rhodesia as Deputy High Commissioner, and was still there in November 1965 when Ian Smith signed the Unilateral Declaration of Independence and a state of emergency. The British High Commissioner has to leave and Fingland stayed on as head of the residual mission until he was also expelled in 1966. He was then posted as High Commissioner to Sierra Leone 1966–69, an unstable time during which there were three military coups. After three years as assistant Under-Secretary of State at the Foreign and Commonwealth Office Fingland was posted as ambassador to Cuba 1972–75 and finally as High Commissioner to Kenya 1975–79, during which time he was also the UK Permanent Representative to the UN Environment Programme and briefly to the UN Centre for Human Settlements after it was established in 1978 (both UN organisations have their headquarters at Nairobi, Kenya).

"In all his posts, Fingland was utterly lacking in pretension; he was blessed with robust common sense, and was a prescient and practical organiser of unquestionable integrity." — Obituary, The Telegraph, London, 21 March 2003

Stanley Fingland was appointed aCompanion of the Order of St Michael and St George (CMG) in the 1966 New Year Honours and promoted to Knight Commander of the Order (KCMG)) in the 1979 New Year Honours.

Diplomatic posts
| Preceded by Desmond Crawley | High Commissioner of the United Kingdom to Sierra Leone; 1966–1969 | Succeeded by Stephen Olver |
| Preceded by Richard Sykes | Ambassador from the United Kingdom to Cuba; 1972–1975 | Succeeded by Sir Edward Jackson |
| Preceded by Sir Antony Duff | High Commissioner of the United Kingdom to Kenya; 1975–1979 | Succeeded by Sir John Williams |
