= Stephen Olver =

British diplomat

Sir Stephen Olver KBE, CMG
- Born: June 16, 1916
- Died: June 22, 2011 (aged 95)
- Education: Stowe School
- Alma mater: Ludwig-Maximilians-Universität München
- Occupation: Diplomat
- Office: British High Commissioner to Sierra Leone

Sir Stephen Olver KBE CMG (16 June 1916 – 22 June 2011) was a British diplomat who was High Commissioner to Sierra Leone and Cyprus.

== Career ==
Stephen Olver was among the last of his generation of men who served British India in their youth and shifted the focus of their careers to the British Foreign Service and international affairs in middle age. He was employed in turn by the Indian police, the Indian Political Service and the newly formed Pakistan Foreign Service. Transferring to the British Diplomatic Service in 1950, he ended his career 25 years later as High Commissioner in Nicosia.

— Obituary, The Times, London, 20 July 2011

Stephen John Linley Olver was educated at Stowe School and the Ludwig-Maximilians-Universität München. He served with the (pre-independence) Indian Police Service 1935–44 and then with the Indian Political Service in Delhi, Quetta, Sikkim and Bahrain, 1944–47. When Pakistan became independent in August 1947 Olver continued to serve the Pakistan Foreign Service in Karachi until 1950 when he transferred to the British Foreign Service. He served in Berlin, Bangkok, Washington, D.C. and The Hague before being appointed High Commissioner to Sierra Leone in 1969. His last appointment was High Commissioner to Cyprus 1973–75.

Stephen Olver was appointed MBE in the New Year Honours of 1948 and CMG in the New Year Honours of 1965. He was knighted KBE shortly before his retirement, in the New Year Honours of 1975.

== Offices held ==
Diplomatic posts
Preceded by Stanley Fingland	High Commissioner of the United Kingdom to Sierra Leone; 1969–72	Succeeded by Ian Watt
Preceded by Robert Edmonds	High Commissioner of the United Kingdom to Cyprus; 1973–75	Succeeded by Donald McDonald Gordon

== Sources ==
- OLVER, Sir Stephen (John Linley), Who Was Who, A & C Black, 1920–2008; online edn, Oxford University Press, Dec 2011; retrieved 22 May 2012
- Sir Stephen Olver (obituary), The Times, London, 29 July 2011, page 47
