= Mick Atkin =

English footballer

Personal information
- Full name: John Michael Atkin
- Date of birth: 14 February 1948
- Place of birth: Scunthorpe, England
- Date of death: 15 January 2008 (age 59)
- Place of death: Cleethorpes, England
- Position: Central defender

Senior career*
Years	Team	Apps	(Gls)
1969–1975	Scunthorpe United	119	(0)
	Gainsborough Trinity	?	(?)
- * Club domestic league appearances and goals

John Michael Atkin (1948–2008), born in Scunthorpe, Lincolnshire, England, was an English footballer who played as a half back in the Football League.
