= Joseph Nickerson =

English farmer

Joe Nickerson (April 1914 Thoresway, Lincolnshire – 1990 Palm Beach, Florida) was a highly successful farmer, entrepreneur and countryman.

Founder of Nickerson Seed Company in 1940 and based in Rothwell, Lincolnshire he introduced 80 cereal varieties and winter barley to the UK. The company was sold to Shell in 1970 and subsequently Groupe Limagrain.

In 1960 he founded Cherry Valley Farms Ltd, leading supplier of duck breeding stock and exporting globally.

He had two daughters; Louise and the journalist Rosie Whitaker née Nickerson.

== Published works ==
Nickerson was author of a A Shooting Man's Creed, a field memoir with a foreword by the Gerald Grosvenor, 6th Duke of Westminster published in 1989 by Quiller Publishing.
