= Philip Priestley =

British diplomat (1946–2022)

Philip Priestley CBE FRSA

British Ambassador to Gabon
- In office 1990 – July 1991
- Preceded by: Mark Goodfellow
- Succeeded by: Embassy closed

British High Commissioner to Belize
- In office 2001–2004
- Preceded by: Timothy David
- Succeeded by: Alan Jones

Personal details
- Born: 29 August 1946
- Died: 24 September 2022 (aged 76)
- Education: University of East Anglia (BA)

Philip John Priestley CBE FRSA (29 August 1946 – 24 September 2022) was a British diplomat.

He was educated at Boston Grammar School and at the University of East Anglia (BA). He served as British Ambassador to Gabon from 1990 to 1991, and as British High Commissioner to Belize from 2001 to 2004. He was a fellow at the Weatherhead Center for International Affairs at Harvard University from 1991 to 1992.
