= Society for Storytelling =

Founded in 1993, the Society for Storytelling is a UK-based society which support the art of traditional storytelling. Open to anyone with an interest in the form, it coordinates National Storytelling Week which takes place in January of each year. Former Storytelling Laureate Taffy Thomas is currently Patron of the Society.

== See also ==
- The Story Museum
