= List of high commissioners of the United Kingdom to Belize =

The high commissioner of the United Kingdom to Belize is the United Kingdom's foremost diplomatic representative in Belize, and head of the UK's diplomatic mission in Belize.

As fellow members of the Commonwealth of Nations, diplomatic relations between the United Kingdom and Belize are at governmental level, rather than between heads of state. Thus, the countries exchange high commissioners rather than ambassadors.

== Heads of mission ==
=== High commissioners to Belize ===
- 1981–1984: Francis Trew
- 1984–1987: John Crosby
- 1987–1991: Peter Thomson
- 1991–1995: David Mackilligin
- 1995–1998: Gordon Baker
- 1998–2001: Timothy David
- 2001–2004: Philip Priestley
- 2004–2007: Alan Jones
- 2007–2008: John Yapp
- 2008–2013: Patrick Ashworth
- 2013–2018: Peter Hughes
- 2018–2022: Claire Evans
- 2022–2024: Nicole Davison
- 2024–2025: Christine Rowlands (Acting)
- 2025–present: Alistair White (Acting until June 2026)
