= Peter Penfold =

British diplomat (1944–2023)

Peter Penfold CMG OBE

British High Commissioner to Sierra Leone
- In office 1997–2000
- Monarch: Elizabeth II
- Prime Minister: Tony Blair
- Preceded by: Ian McCluney
- Succeeded by: Alan Jones

Governor of the British Virgin Islands
- In office 1991–1996
- Prime Minister: John Major
- Preceded by: Mark Herdman
- Succeeded by: David Mackilligin

Personal details
- Born: Peter Alfred Penfold; 27 February 1944
- Died: 1 October 2023 (aged 79)
- Spouse: Celia Penfold
- Children: 3
- Occupation: Diplomat

Peter Alfred Penfold CMG OBE (27 February 1944 – 1 October 2023) was a British diplomat who was the second youngest governor of the British Virgin Islands and was High Commissioner to the Republic of Sierra Leone. His career began in 1963, when he joined the Foreign Service as a clerical officer. Two years into his career, he was posted to the British embassy in Bonn, West Germany, and two years after that to Nigeria. From 1970 to 1972, Penfold served as a "floater" in Latin America, filling in as necessary for staff at British missions in the region. He served in Mexico during the 1970 football world cup, and on St Vincent, where he was responsible for organising an evacuation after a volcanic eruption. After Latin America, Penfold briefly served in Canberra, before returning to London to take a post in the Foreign and Commonwealth Office (FCO). He earned early promotion to second secretary in Addis Ababa, Ethiopia, where he was responsible for reporting on the Organisation of African Unity (OAU) and the Eritrean War of Independence and was still in the country during the revolution, in which the pro-Western emperor was overthrown. After completing his tour in Ethiopia, Penfold served as information officer in Port of Spain and then as first secretary in the West Africa Department of the FCO.

Penfold's next overseas posting was to Kampala, Uganda, as deputy high commissioner. There, he persuaded President Milton Obote to attend the queen's birthday party for the first time. Two months later, Obote was overthrown in a coup, after which Penfold led an evacuation of foreign citizens to Kenya. The high commission remained open, and Penfold was still present six months later when a second coup took place.

In 1987, he again returned to the FCO, this time serving in the West Indian and Atlantic Department, and four years later, he was appointed Governor of the British Virgin Islands. The main issues of Penfold's tenure were the establishment of the territory as an offshore financial centre and the smuggling of drugs through its waters until the sudden death of the chief minister. Penfold resolved the subsequent constitutional crisis by appointing the deputy chief minister as an interim replacement. Penfold's term as governor expired in 1996, after which he spent a year as a drugs adviser to the Caribbean before being appointed High Commissioner to Sierra Leone in 1997. Six weeks into Penfold's term, President Ahmad Tejan Kabbah was overthrown in a military coup and Penfold organised an evacuation of foreign citizens.

After a hotel housing the remaining foreign nationals was attacked, Penfold organised a further evacuation, which was conducted by an American warship. The ship transported the evacuees—including Penfold—to Conakry in neighbouring Guinea. While in Conakry, Penfold advised Kabbah on re-establishing his government in exile, and leased a disused restaurant for the government's headquarters. Kabbah was restored in February 1998, but the role of the private military company Sandline International in assisting Kabbah created controversy in the United Kingdom, as its services were alleged to violate an arms embargo on Sierra Leone. After an HM Customs investigation, a parliamentary inquiry, and a select committee investigation, Penfold was reprimanded but allowed to return to his post.

Later in the year, violence began to intensify again in Sierra Leone, and Penfold was ordered to evacuate foreign nationals (the eight evacuation of his career and the second in Sierra Leone) over Christmas 1998. He requested an extension to his term as high commissioner, but the request was denied and he left Sierra Leone in April 2000. He spent the last year of his career working for the Department for International Development and retired in 2001.

In retirement, Penfold spoke on issues concerning Africa, particularly Sierra Leone, and was critical of the FCO. His support of Kabbah, and his role in returning him to power in 1998, earned Penfold folk hero status in Sierra Leone.

== Early life ==
Peter Alfred Penfold was born to Alfred and Florence (née Green) in 1944 and educated at Sutton Grammar School for Boys, where he stayed on until 19. He left school with A-levels in French, German, and geography, and took casual employment to earn money. Having a desire to make use of his language qualifications, he began applying for jobs at multi-national companies. He applied to Civil Service and passed the civil service exam, but was keen to join the Foreign Service. He took and passed a second exam to join the Foreign Service, but had to enter at a lower grade than he would have held in the Civil Service.

== Early career ==
=== 1963–1984: career beginnings ===
Penfold's diplomatic career began as a clerical officer at the Foreign and Commonwealth Office (FCO) in London in 1963. In 1965, two years into his career, Penfold was posted to the British embassy in Bonn, West Germany, where he served as a clerical officer until 1968. At the end of his posting, he was sent to Kaduna, Nigeria, where he was one of only six staff. Penfold admitted that—had he been able to choose his posting—he would probably not have chosen Kaduna and may not have considered Africa, but the posting "started [his] love affair with Africa". He spent two years in Kaduna as one of the three junior staff who, unlike the senior staff, had no diplomatic privilege. From 1970 to 1972, Penfold was a Latin American "floater"—part of a pool of five staff who could be sent to assist diplomatic missions to provide support during busy times or to cover for staff leave.

Penfold's first assignment as Latin American floater was in Mexico City, where he acted as vice consul during the football world cup while many of the diplomatic staff were in Guadalajara, where the England national team were based. After the conclusion of the world cup, Penfold was sent to Ecuador, where he was responsible for overseeing renovation work to the ambassador's residence. He was in Ecuador for six months, after which he was sent to Uruguay to assist in the aftermath of the kidnapping of Ambassador Geoffrey Jackson. Six weeks later, he was ordered to Paraguay, where the British mission was staffed by a single diplomat, for whom Penfold would cover while they took leave. Penfold's final posting as a "floater" was to St Vincent, which at the time relied on the United Kingdom for defence and foreign policy matters. Three weeks after his arrival, the volcano on the island erupted, and Penfold was responsible for co-ordinating an evacuation by the Royal Navy.

Of his term as Latin American floater, Penfold stated that he found the variety of tasks he performed "valuable experience" for his later career. After Latin America, he was immediately sent to Canberra in 1972, having been told that the passport officer there was dying. He arrived to find that there had been a misunderstanding regarding the passport officer's health. He stayed to assist for three months before returning to London, where he became a desk officer in the Pacific and Dependent Territories Department of the Foreign and Commonwealth Office (FCO). Working with the Overseas Development Administration, he was responsible for several small territories in the Pacific. During his tenure, Penfold turned down a job inside 10 Downing Street as part of a European Commission secretariat being set up by Prime Minister Ted Heath, believing the position to be inferior to the one he held.

=== 1975–1987: Ethiopia and Uganda ===
In 1975, while serving at the FCO, Penfold volunteered to learn a difficult language in the hope of advancing his career. After passing an aptitude test, he was assigned a professional language tutor and began learning Amharic—the official language of Ethiopia—and after six weeks of tuition, was sent to Gondar to continue learning the language by living in Ethiopia. Shortly after, he was posted to Addis Ababa as second secretary, because the British ambassador to Ethiopia, Sir Willie Morris, was keen to have an Amharic-speaking second secretary. Penfold was responsible for monitoring and reporting on internal Ethiopian affairs and the Organisation of African Unity (OAU), as the latter was based in Addis. As part of the role, Penfold was required to attend and report on meetings of the OAU, which took place all over Africa. On the instruction of Foreign Secretary David Owen, Penfold met with the leaders of the independence movement in Southern Rhodesia (modern-day Zimbabwe) at an OAU conference in Gabon in 1977. There he met separately with Bishop Muzorewa, Joshua Nkomo, and Robert Mugabe. Penfold believed Mugabe to be difficult to work with, but later stated that it should have been obvious that Mugabe would come to power in Zimbabwe and that the British government could have made a greater effort to work with him.

Penfold's tenure in Ethiopia coincided with the Eritrean War of Independence, which Penfold was responsible for monitoring. To that end, he was required to covertly meet with Eritrean informants, sometimes smuggling them back to the British compound in the boot of his car, to keep up to date on the progress of the war. Penfold was also in the country during the Ethiopian Revolution, in which the pro-Western Emperor Haile Selassie I was overthrown by a faction of the military—which became the Derg—sympathetic to the Soviet Union. He remained in Ethiopia until 1978, when he was sent to Port of Spain as information officer, with responsibility for editing a magazine aimed at promoting British trade. Penfold returned to London in 1981, serving as first secretary in the West Africa Department of the FCO. At the time, the FCO had two career "streams"—one for non-graduates and a faster one for university graduates—and during his time in the West Africa Department, Penfold "bridged" into the faster stream.

After "bridging", Penfold was promoted and posted to Kampala, Uganda, in 1984 as deputy high commissioner. He had attended an OAU conference in Uganda in the 1970s and was pleased to be posted there. Within a few weeks, the high commissioner took leave and Penfold became acting high commissioner. One of his first tasks was the 1985 high commission's queen's birthday party, which he postponed to allow President Milton Obote to attend—the first time Obote attended a national day. Two months after the birthday party, Penfold was still acting high commissioner when he was informed of an impending coup. He notified the American, French, and UN representatives, after which he instructed all the British staff to move into the high commissioner's residence until the fighting was over. As shooting broke out on the outskirts of Kampala, Obote fled the country along with most of his ministers, leaving the country in chaos. The following day, Penfold travelled into the city centre with the American and UN representatives to determine who was in charge of the country and make contact with the new regime. He met a Ugandan Army major, to whom he expressed his concerns about the security situation and explained that foreign citizens would likely be evacuated, which happened three days later when Penfold led an evacuation by road to Kenya. Although most foreign citizens had left, Penfold kept the British High Commission open and all the staff remained. The Ugandan military began forming a government and attempted to include all tribes in the country, to which end Penfold assisted by meeting with Yoweri Museveni, leader of the National Resistance Army. Museveni refused to join the government and six months later led another coup and declared himself president. Penfold was appointed an Officer of the Order of the British Empire (OBE) in 1986.

=== 1987–1997: FCO and the British Virgin Islands ===
Penfold returned to the FCO in 1987, where he was appointed to a position in the West Indian and Atlantic Department, which was responsible for the Caribbean and South Atlantic. The department was divided between British Dependent Territories (for which Penfold was responsible) and independent nations. In the years before and during Penfold's tenure, the British dependencies had been the subject of several diplomatic incidents and were causing problems for the British government, to whom the international community looked to resolve problems with its dependent territories. The FCO had struggled to find new governors for the territories since the winding-up of the Colonial Service—which had historically provided most governors and many civil servants—in the 1960s. Thus, Penfold recommended in a policy paper that the Diplomatic Service be considered as a recruiting pool, and that governors be recruited earlier in their career rather than at the end. He also identified several posts which could be used for training potential governors, including the one he occupied and deputy governor posts such as that in Bermuda.

The government accepted Penfold's recommendations, to the extent that he was appointed Governor of the British Virgin Islands in 1991, which, at the age of 48, made him the youngest serving governor of a British territory. The governor represents the monarch and the British government, as well as presiding over the cabinet, but is also required to swear an oath to the constitution of the territory, which Penfold believed complicated the governor's role as a representative of the British government. Among Penfold's duties as governor was the purchase of an aeroplane to assist in combating drug smuggling through the territory and assisting in establishing the British Virgin Islands as an offshore financial centre; the number of registered companies in the Islands rose to 35,000 (more than double the population) during Penfold's tenure. As governor, Penfold became increasingly aware of growing resentment among the citizens of the British dependencies regarding their rights of entry and abode in the UK. He proposed that the territories be renamed "British overseas territories", and that their citizens be given equal rights of entry and abode—proposals that were eventually accepted. At the end of Penfold's term, a constitutional crisis arose after Chief Minister Hamilton Lavity Stoutt died suddenly. The constitution of the territory contained no provision for the chief minister dying in office, and the death left the governing party without a majority in the assembly, so Penfold asked Deputy Chief Minister Ralph O'Neal to become "Chief Minister ad interim" to provide political stability. Penfold was appointed a Companion of the Order of St Michael and St George (CMG) in the 1995 Birthday Honours for his service in the British Virgin Islands.

After he had completed his term as governor in 1996, the FCO struggled to find a post for Penfold, so they appointed him to the newly created post of special drugs adviser to the Caribbean, in which he worked as part of a team of advisers from across the European Union assisting Caribbean governments in developing policies to combat the smuggling of illegal drugs.

== Sierra Leone ==
=== Military coup and first evacuation ===
Although he enjoyed the posting as drugs adviser, Penfold was keen to go back to Africa. He applied for a post as high commissioner in Namibia, but the post was downgraded and the application fell through. Penfold was then offered a posting to Sierra Leone.

Although it was a lower-ranking post than the British Virgin Islands, Penfold was assured that taking the position would not adversely affect his career, so he accepted and, in March 1997, was appointed High Commissioner to Sierra Leone. He later stated that he believed his previous experience in Africa, particularly in Uganda, stood him in good stead for the events of his posting to Sierra Leone. The country was in the middle of a bloody civil war in 1997, and on 25 May—six weeks into Penfold's tenure—President Ahmad Tejan Kabbah's government was overthrown in a military coup. Although the coup itself did not come as a surprise, the timing caught the international community off-guard. As in Uganda a decade earlier, Penfold gathered all the high commission staff and their families under one roof.

Kabbah was evacuated to Conakry in neighbouring Guinea almost as soon as fighting broke out, and the coup-makers established the Armed Forces Revolutionary Council (AFRC) with Johnny Paul Koroma as its chairman. The following day, Penfold invited Koroma and several of his associates, along with representatives of Nigeria, the United States, and the UN, to a meeting at the British high commissioner's residence. He found it remarkable that they all attended, but believed it epitomised the esteem in which the office of British high commissioner was held in Sierra Leone.

At the meeting, Koroma agreed to open the country's main airport temporarily the next day, which allowed Penfold to organise the evacuation of several planeloads of foreign nationals. The men agreed to reconvene the following day and the meetings continued throughout the week, though almost all diplomatic missions—including those of the UN and US—closed over the course of the week, leaving just the British and Nigerians in Freetown. In that time, Penfold believed he had persuaded the coup-makers to stand down and allow Kabbah to return but, unbeknownst to the diplomats, the AFRC had invited the Revolutionary United Front (RUF)—the main rebel group in the civil war—to form a joint government in Freetown.

Days after the arrival of the RUF, on 2 June, rebels and soldiers attacked the Mammy Yoko hotel—where around 800 foreign citizens had gathered under the protection of Nigerian soldiers—in response to a Nigerian naval bombardment of Freetown. Penfold was able to see the firefight from the high commission building, and telephoned the Sierra Leonean defence headquarters to demand an end to the violence, threatening to request the deployment of US Marines from the USS Kearsarge, which was anchored offshore. The defence headquarters promptly ordered an end to the shooting, and the occupants of the hotel were evacuated to another nearby hotel for the night and then to the USS Kearsarge the next morning (3 June).

In addition, Penfold and the remaining members of his staff (most of the staff and all their families had already left) were ordered to evacuate on the Kearsarge, despite Penfold's objections. The Kearsarge sailed to Conakry, where Kabbah had been staying since the beginning of the coup.

No country recognised the military junta, and the international community continued to recognise the exiled Kabbah government as the legitimate government of Sierra Leone. Kabbah re-established his government in Conakry, basing it in a former Chinese restaurant leased by the British government through Penfold. There, Penfold advised Kabbah on keeping up the government's presence on the international stage, such as by ensuring that a representative was sent to international meetings. He continued to run the British diplomatic mission in Freetown; the high commission continued to pay its local staff and began smuggling food and money into Sierra Leone. During the ten months in which the Kabbah government was exiled, Penfold — with funds from the British Department for International Development (DfID)—also assisted in the setting up of a covert radio station, which broadcast on behalf of the exiled government.

=== Sandline affair ===
From Conakry, Penfold also assisted Kabbah in negotiations with Sandline International—a private military company led by Tim Spicer, a former British Army officer—whom Kabbah intended to hire to lead a counter-coup. Sandline had been contracted to provide assistance to the Nigerian-led forces in Sierra Leone at a time when relations between the UK and Nigeria were poor, so Penfold used Sandline personnel to liaise with the Nigerians to provide intelligence for Kabbah and the British High Commission. In February 1998, a coalition of Nigerian troops and local militia—assisted by Sandline—restored Kabbah to power, and Penfold was transported back to Freetown by a British warship. The role of Sandline, however, sparked a political controversy in the United Kingdom, as the company was accused of violating an international arms embargo on Sierra Leone. Penfold was ordered back to the UK, where he was investigated by HM Customs and Excise for allegedly assisting Spicer in violating the embargo. Customs dropped their investigation after deciding it was not in the public interest to prosecute anybody, but Foreign Secretary Robin Cook ordered a parliamentary inquiry into what the FCO knew about Sandline's contract with Kabbah. Penfold received a reprimand for failing to report adequately on his dealings with Sandline, and the inquiry—led by Sir Thomas Legg—recommended better communication between the FCO and the high commissioner.

In Sierra Leone, Penfold was widely considered a hero for his role in restoring Kabbah. While he was giving evidence to the inquiry, 20,000 people took part in a demonstration demanding his return to Sierra Leone, and upon his arrival at Lungi airport, he was appointed an honorary Paramount Chief—becoming only the third person to be granted the honour since Sierra Leone's independence—and was greeted by large crowds. Shortly after his return, Penfold was again summoned back to London to face an investigation by the House of Commons Foreign Affairs Select Committee. He gave evidence in a televised session in which he stated his belief that the Sandline controversy was a peripheral issue and that the FCO should be focusing on supporting the newly restored Kabbah government. The committee's report expressed concern about Penfold's role with regard to Sandline, but believed he "acted as he thought was in the best interests of the United Kingdom and of Sierra Leone, and that he did not consider that his actions went beyond government policy". Penfold stated after his retirement that he felt Sierra Leone became a "political football" in the UK and that, had the FCO's focus not been distracted by the Sandline issue, later problems in Sierra Leone might have been avoided.

=== Second evacuation, Lomé Accord, and replacement ===
Towards the end of 1998, the RUF began to re-mobilise in northern Sierra Leone. As tensions escalated, the FCO ordered an evacuation of British citizens just before Christmas. Penfold believed the evacuation—the eighth of his career—was unnecessary and argued against it; his objections were over-ruled and he was ordered to evacuate his staff, though he was allowed to remain in Freetown with his military protection detail. The Royal Air Force evacuated approximately 35 people, but many British people chose to stay. Penfold travelled to Abidjan after Christmas for an international summit on Sierra Leone, but the FCO refused to allow him to return to Sierra Leone, so he again based himself in a hotel in Conakry. The RUF attacked Freetown on 6 January 1999. After 10 days of fighting, the rebels were pushed back and Penfold was transported back to Sierra Leone by a British warship. He flew to Freetown for daily meetings with Kabbah, but was not allowed to move back into his residence and so temporarily lived on the ship. Later in 1999, the Sierra Leone government entered into negotiations which resulted in the Lomé Peace Agreement. Penfold opposed power-sharing with the RUF, and believed he was excluded from the talks in Lomé because of his views. The agreement did not hold, and violence again broke out in early 2000.

Penfold's term as high commissioner expired in April 2000. He requested a British military adviser be sent to Sierra Leone, as well as an extension to his own term, both of which were denied. He left the country on 30 April and was succeeded by Alan Jones. After returning to the UK, he applied for multiple posts but was turned down for each. He was asked to take early retirement, but was keen to retire on his own terms. He eventually took a job as a conflict adviser to DfID, having developed what he described as "a very good relationship with ... [the] DfID".

== Retirement ==
In retirement, Penfold has been critical of the FCO's attitude towards Africa, and has expressed the view that it does not give high enough priority to the continent. He stated in an interview that he felt the FCO was keen to develop experts in other areas, such as Europe and the Middle East, but "Africa is the place where anybody can do it so long as they have average intelligence". Since retiring, he has taken on roles with various charities and other organisations focusing on Africa and Sierra Leone, including New Africa Analysis, the UK Association for Schools for the Blind, Sierra Leone (which supports the Sir Milton Margai School for the Blind in Freetown), and the Dorothy Springer Trust. He is considered a folk hero in Sierra Leone, and continues to speak on issues relating to Sierra Leone. He was vocal in his opposition to indictment of Samuel Hinga Norman—a pro-Kabbah militia leader during the civil war—for war crimes by the Special Court for Sierra Leone, and to the special court itself. He described the special court as an "expensive and divisive piece of judicial machinery" which served little purpose following the deaths of most of the prominent defendants, and believed that its continuation "could undermine the fragile peace" in Sierra Leone. Penfold was granted the Freedom of the City of Freetown and given the honorary title of Paramount Chief for his role in Sierra Leone, and has written a book about his experiences in the country, Atrocities, Diamonds and Diplomacy (ISBN 978-1-84884-768-2).

== Personal life and death ==
Penfold met his first wife-to-be while serving on St Vincent as Latin American floater. He was planning his wedding at the end of his term in Latin America but was persuaded to postpone it due to the urgency with which he was required in Canberra, and the wedding eventually took place later in 1972. The couple had three children, but his wife did not enjoy the overseas postings. They divorced in 1984 and Penfold travelled to Kampala alone.

While in Uganda, Penfold met his second wife-to-be, Celia, who was working for the World Bank. They married while Penfold was Governor of the British Virgin Islands, making Penfold the first British governor to get married in-post. Both Penfold and his wife consider themselves committed Christians, and Penfold has stated that, "as a Christian, I have felt more at home in Africa".

Penfold died from cancer on 1 October 2023, at the age of 79. There will be a memorial service for Peter Penfold on 26 October, which is to be held at St Augustine's church, Hill Station, Freetown.
