= Lungi Lol confrontation =

2000 conflict in Sierra Leone

- Part of the Sierra Leone Civil War
Date	17 May 2000
Location	Sierra Leone
Result	British victory

Belligerents
United Kingdom (United Nations) UNAMSIL: Nigeria	RUF

Strength
~30 British Pathfinders 20 Nigerian Peacekeepers	30–40

Casualties and losses
None	14 killed
- 1 civilian wounded

The Lungi Lol confrontation was a confrontation between British forces and the Revolutionary United Front (RUF) in Sierra Leone on 17 May 2000.

== Background ==
Sierra Leone is a former British colony in West Africa, close to the equator, with an area of 71,740 square kilometres (27,700 square miles)—similar in size to South Carolina or Scotland. By 2000, the country had been engaged in a civil war between the government and the Revolutionary United Front (RUF). The RUF was a rebel group formed in the late 1980s and fought against successive governments until the Lomé Peace Accord in 1997, in which it was given the status of a legitimate political party and its leader, Foday Sankoh, was appointed vice president. Despite this, in April 2000, the RUF attacked a disarmament camp into which four of its members had been admitted.

The RUF's subsequent march on the capital, Freetown, prompted a large-scale military intervention by the United Kingdom, which began on 8 May 2000 with an evacuation of foreign citizens (Operation Palliser).

== Confrontation ==
Upon their arrival in Sierra Leone, British soldiers immediately began securing areas that would be vital for a non-combatant evacuation operation, including the country's main airport, Lungi, and the surrounding area. To that end, the Pathfinder Platoon—a forward reconnaissance unit of the Parachute Regiment and part of 16 Air Assault Brigade—established itself in the village of Lungi Lol, close to the airport and 12 miles (19 km) north of Freetown on the opposite side of the Sierra Leone River. Despite the arrival of British soldiers, the RUF continued to advance, resulting in sporadic engagements with United Nations forces and the remnants of the Sierra Leone Army, but it was not until the 17 May that they came into contact with British forces. Refugees fleeing in the wake of the rebel advance alerted the Pathfinder Platoon to the RUF advance and the Paras adopted defensive positions.

The engagement began at around 04:45, when 30 to 40 rebel soldiers approached the village and engaged the British. The ensuing firefight lasted about ten minutes but was followed by a series of four or five engagements. The RUF attacked with small arms and rocket-propelled grenades; the British returned fire and used mortars to illuminate the area. After several hours of fighting, the RUF withdrew. The bodies of four rebel soldiers were later discovered and the RUF later reported a further ten men killed in the incident. No casualties were suffered by the British and one Sierra Leonean civilian was wounded in the crossfire.

== Impact ==
The arrival of British forces provided a morale boost in Sierra Leone— an effect which moved many foreign nationals to remain in the country and which was enhanced by the British success in what became their only direct confrontation with the RUF. According to Brigadier David Richards, commander of British forces in Sierra Leone, the victory provided an "immense" effect in "deterring the RUF and further enhancing our status [that of the British forces] in the eyes of the UN and Sierra Leoneans".

The British victory added to the confusion that was already affecting the RUF at the time of the engagement, and served to dampen the already low morale of the RUF. Later the same day, the RUF's leader, Foday Sankoh, was captured and handed over to the Sierra Leone Police. The combined effect of the two events led to chaos and in-fighting within the RUF to the extent that it was not judged to pose an immediate threat. British fears of a retaliatory attack by the RUF proved unfounded and the Ministry of Defence was able to order the first rotation of forces in Sierra Leone, which saw the Paras replaced by Royal Marines.

Sergeant Stephen Heaney, who commanded the Pathfinder Platoon during the engagement, was awarded the Military Cross for his role.
