= List of high commissioners of the United Kingdom to Sierra Leone =

British High Commissioner to Sierra Leone
- Royal arms of His Majesty's Government
- Incumbent; Josephine Gauld since September 2024
- Reports to: Secretary of State for Foreign, Commonwealth and Development Affairs
- Inaugural holder: John Baines Johnston; First high commissioner to Sierra Leone
- Formation: 1961
- Website: www.gov.uk/world/sierra-leone

The high commissioner of the United Kingdom to Sierra Leone is the United Kingdom's foremost diplomatic representative in the Republic of Sierra Leone.

Sierra Leone gained independence from the United Kingdom in 1961. As both countries are members of the Commonwealth of Nations, they exchange high commissioners rather than ambassadors.

== List of heads of mission ==
=== High commissioners ===
- 1961–1963: John Johnston
- 1963–1966: Desmond Crawley
- 1966–1969: Stanley Fingland
- 1969–1972: Stephen Olver
- 1972–1976: Ian Watt
- 1976–1977: David Roberts
- 1977–1981: Michael Morgan
- 1981–1984: Terence Daniel O'Leary
- 1984–1986: Richard Clift
- 1986–1991: Derek Partridge
- 1991–1993: David Sprague
- 1993–1997: Ian McCluney
- 1997–2000: Peter Penfold
- 2000–2003: Alan Jones
- 2003–2006: John Mitchiner
- 2006–2008: Sarah MacIntosh
- 2009–2013: Ian Hughes
- 2013–2016: Peter West
- 2016–2019: Guy Warrington
- 2019–2021 Simon Mustard
- 2021–2024: Lisa Chesney
- From September 2024: Josephine Gauld
