= Cyril Bland =

British cricketer

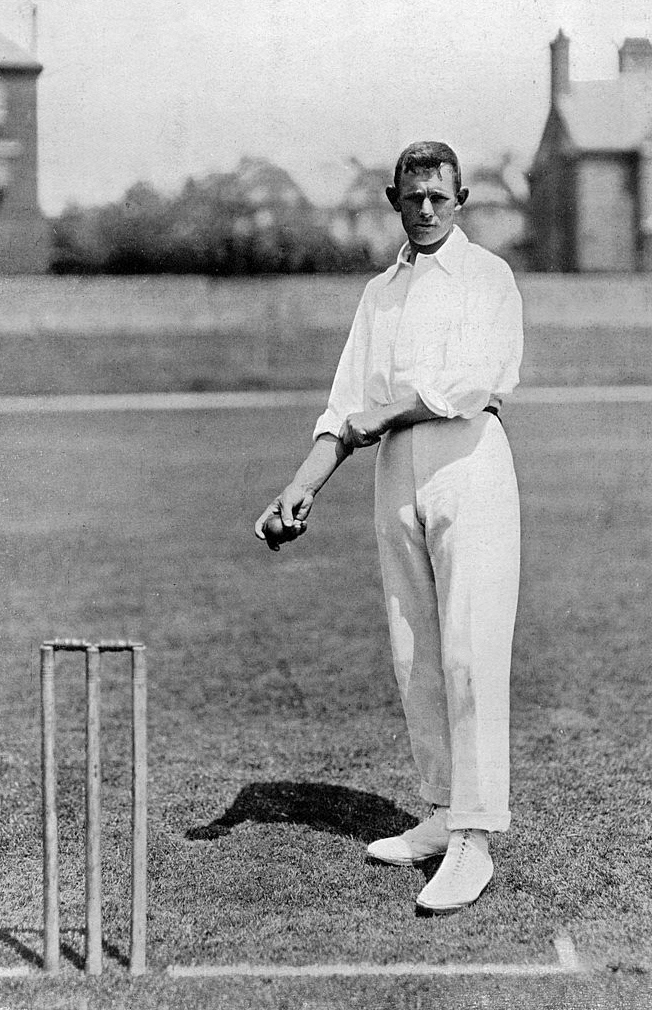

Personal information
- Born: 23 May 1872; Boston, Lincolnshire, England
- Died: 1 July 1950 (aged 78); Cowbridge, Boston, Lincolnshire, England
- Batting: Right-handed
- Bowling: Right-arm medium

Domestic team information
- Years: Team
- 1897–1904: Sussex

Career statistics
Competition	First-class
Matches	147
Runs scored	998
Batting average	6.43
100s/50s	3/25
Top score	59
Balls bowled	27,548
Wickets	557
Bowling average	24.28
5 wickets in innings	44
10 wickets in match	11
Best bowling	10/48
Catches/stumpings	80/–
- Source: CricInfo, 26 April 2023

Cyril Herbert George Bland (23 May 1872 – 1 July 1950) was an English cricketer active from 1897 to 1904 who played for Sussex. He was born in Boston, Lincolnshire, where he was educated at Boston Grammar School, and died at Cowbridge, Boston, Lincolnshire, Lincolnshire. He appeared in 147 first-class matches as a righthanded batsman who bowled right arm fast. He scored 998 runs with a highest score of 59 and took 557 wickets with a best performance of ten for 48.

Bland achieved his ten wickets in an innings feat playing for Sussex against Kent at the Angel Ground, Tonbridge, in the 1900 season.

Aged 78, Bland committed suicide by drowning himself in the Greenlands Drain in Boston, Lincolnshire in 1950.
