= List of football clubs in Sierra Leone =

This is a list of Football clubs in Sierra Leone. For a complete list see Category:Football clubs in Sierra Leone

== A ==
- Anti Drugs Strikers

== B ==
- Bai Bureh Warriors
- Bintumani Scorpions
- Bo Rangers

== C ==
- Central Parade

== D ==
- Diamond Stars

== E ==
- East End Lions
- Easton Rangers

== F ==
- FC Johansen
- Freetown City F.C.

== G ==
- Gem Stars F.C.
- Goderich United
- Golden Dragon F.C.
- Golf Leopards F.C.

== K ==
- Kakua Rangers F.C.
- Kallon F.C. formerly Real Republicans
- Kamboi Eagles

== M ==
- Mighty Blackpool
- Mount Aureol
- Murray Town Rovers

== N ==
- Nepean Stars

== O ==
- Old Edwardians F.C.

== P ==
- Ports Authority F.C.

== R ==
- Real Republicans F.C.
- Regent Olympic F.C.
- Republic of Sierra Leone Armed Forces FC

== S ==
- Sierra Football Club

== W ==
- Waterloo Strikers
- Wellington People F.C.
- Wusum Stars

== Y ==
- Yambatui Stars
