= Sierra Leone National First Division =

Sierra Leone National First Division.
- Founded: 2002
- Country: Sierra Leone
- Confederation: CAF
- Number of clubs: 14
- Level on pyramid: 2
- Promotion to: Sierra Leone National Premier League
- Relegation to: Sierra Leone National Second Division
- Domestic cup(s): Sierra Leonean FA Cup
- Current champions: Mount Aureol (2020)

Sierra Leone National First Division is the second highest football league in Sierra Leone, after the Sierra Leone National Premier League. Along with the Sierra Leone National Premier League, they are the two major football leagues in Sierra Leone. The league is controlled by the Sierra Leone Football Association.

== Format ==
The 14 clubs that make up the National First Division play each other twice during the season, once at home and once away. At the end of the season, the top two clubs from the National First Division are promoted to the Sierra Leone National Premiere League, while the bottom two clubs are relegated to the Sierra Leone second division.

== 2007/2008 teams ==
Club	City
Bai Bureh Warriors	Port Loko
Bintumani Scorpions	Kabala
Brookfields United	Freetown
Easton Rangers	Freetown
Freetown United	Freetown
Goderich United	Goderich
Kakua Rangers	Bo
Kamboi Eagles	Kenema
Murray Town Rovers	Freetown
Real Republicans	Freetown
Regent Olympic	Freetown
Waterloo Strikers	Waterloo
Wellington People	Freetown
Yambatui Stars	Moyamba
