= Mustapha Sama =

Sierra Leonean former soccer player (born 1979)

Personal information
- Full name: Mustapha Pa Safa Sama
- Date of birth: 31 October 1979 (age 46)
- Place of birth: Freetown, Sierra Leone
- Height: 6 ft 3 in (1.91 m)
- Positions: Centre back; midfielder

Youth career
- Warry Brothers

Senior career*
Years	Team	Apps	(Gls)
1996	Wellington People		
1997	Wusum Stars		
1997	Ports Authority F.C.		
1998–1999	East End Lions		
1999	JS Kabylie		
1999–2000	Boavista (CPV)		
2000	Vasalund/Essinge IF		
2001–2002	FK Haugesund	48	(9)
2002–2004	Charleroi	31	(2)
2005	Syrianska FC		
2006–2007	LG-ACB Ha Noi		
2007–2008	Persija Jakarta	14	(1)
2008–2009	Al-Wahda	15	(0)
2009	Carolina RailHawks		
2010–2011	Rbac FC		

International career
1996–2008	Sierra Leone	34	(2)
- * Club domestic league appearances and goals

Mustapha Pa Safa Sama (born 31 October 1979 in Freetown) is a Sierra Leonean former soccer player.

== Career ==
=== Early career in Africa ===
Pa Safa was born and raised in Wellington, a poor neighbourhood in the east end of Freetown. He started his football career with his hometown club Wellington People in 1996 as a 17-year-old, and would later go on to play for several clubs in the Sierra Leone National Premier League, including Wusum Stars, Ports Authority and East End Lions, with whom he won the Sierra Leone National Premier League in 1999.

Sama also played for Algerian side JS Kabylie and Cape Verdean team Boavista prior to his move to Europe.

=== Global nomad ===
Sama was signed by Swedish club Vasalund/Essinge IF in 2000, initiating a trip across the second divisions of Europe, playing for FK Haugesund in the Norwegian Adeccoligaen, Charleroi in the Belgian First Division, and Syrianska FC in Sweden. Sama was controversially terminated by Charleroi in 2005 after a dispute over the payment of match bonuses.

Sama moved to his third continent – Asia – in 2006 to play for LG-ACB Ha Noi in the Vietnamese V-League, moved to Indonesia to play for Persija Jakarta in 2007, and then moved west to play for Al-Wahda in Syria in 2008.

Sama then took on his fourth continent – North America – in March 2009 when he signed for the Carolina RailHawks in the USL First Division. After failing to get clearance to transfer to Carolina, Sama briefly went on trial with the San Jose Earthquakes.
