= Fula people of Sierra Leone =

The Sierra Leonean Fula people
Regions with significant populations
- 12.4% of Sierra Leone's population, primarily in: Northern province Eastern province Southern province Western Area

Languages
- Fula, Krio

Religion
- Predominantly Islam

Related ethnic groups
- other Fula people

Fula people of Sierra Leone (Pular: 𞤊𞤵𞤤𞤩𞤫 𞤅𞤢𞤪𞤤𞤮𞤲) is the fourth major ethnic group in Sierra Leone after the Temne, Mende and Limba ethnic groups and a branch of the Fula people of West Africa. The Fula make up about 12.4% of Sierra Leone's population. The Sierra Leone Fula people settled in the Western Area region of Sierra Leone more than four hundred years ago as settlers from the Fouta Djallon Kingdom that expanded to northern Sierra Leone (Kabala, Bombali).

The Sierra Leonean Fula are traditionally a nomadic, pastoralist, trading people, herding cattle, goats and sheep across the vast dry hinterlands of their domain, keeping somewhat separate from the local agricultural populations. Many of the large shopping centers in Sierra Leone are owned and run by the Fula community.

Today, almost all Sierra Leonean Fula are Muslims of the Sunni tradition of Islam. The overwhelming majority of Fula are adherent to the Maliki School within Sunni Islam. A significant number of the Sierra Leonean Fula population are found in all regions of Sierra Leone as traders.

The Fulas have been migrating and settling within Sierra Leone since the 17th Century. Many Fulas today in Sierra Leone are descendants of those who fled the autocratic rule of president Ahmed Sekou Toure and found refuge in the 1960s and 1970s. Others are new arrivals of the last decades due to the open borders that the Mano River Union and globalisation have created in the West African region.

== Family ==
The Sierra Leonean Fula villages are scattered, but each has a central court and a mosque. Together, these compose a miside (community). Each miside has a sub-chief who handles village affairs and who answers to a Sultan (chief). The homes of the settled Fula are round with clay walls and thatched roofs that projects over encircling porches. However, nomadic Fula live in simpler structures, since they are so often moving with the herds. These houses have neither walls nor verandahs, and are encircled by cattle corrals.

Daughters remain with their mothers until they marry. However, as soon as a son reaches puberty, he leaves the family compound and lives alone in a nearby compound, usually taking over a part of his father’s trade. This new compound will be the home of the son and his future wife.

== Religious and traditional beliefs ==
The majority of Sierra Leonean Fulanis are Muslims although a few are Christians. Some Fula practice herbal healings.

The "herd owner's feast" is one such ceremony. During this feast, a bull that has served ten seasons is presented, killed, and eaten.

The Fula people also utilize practices of the Bondo secret society which aims at gradually but firmly establishing attitudes related to adulthood in girls, discussions on fertility, morality and proper sexual comportment. The society also maintains an interest in the well-being of its members throughout their lives.

== Farming ==
The Sierra Leonean Fula are primarily skilled traders in diamonds, gems, gold, lending but formerly cattle, with their lives depending upon and revolving around trade cattle herds prior to the 19th century. The status of a family can be determined by the size and health of its trade. The more a man knows about trade, the greater respect he is given by the community.

Trade is usually a male activity; however, the women tend to act as accountants for the family. They also tend to the small livestock and poultry, cultivate gardens, and carry containers of milk and cheese to the local markets for sale or trade. As the Fula people are Muslim, a woman has all the rights and concerns provided her under Islam. In a Fula family, a mother is 7 times the father, as it pertains to respect and a mother’s rights under Islam.

== Notable Sierra Leonean Fula people ==
- Abubakarr Jalloh, former Sierra Leone Minister of Mineral Resources
- Abu Bakarr Bah, Ph.D.: Professor of Sociology, Northern Illinois University, IL, USA and Editor-in-Chief, African Conflict & Peacebuilding Review
- Alhaji M.B. Jalloh, former Sierra Leone ambassador to Saudi Arabia and the Persian Gulf States
- Alpha Rashid Jalloh notable journalist and now magistrate
- Alimamy Jalloh, Sierra Leonean football star
- Alimamy Rassin, Sierra Leonean Fula chief during colonial period
- Alhaji Amadu Jalloh, Sierra Leonean opposition politician and leader of the National Democratic Alliance political
- Amadu Wurie, early Sierra Leonean educationist and politician
- Abass Bundu, Speaker of the Sierra Leone Parliament
- Chernor Maju Bah, current Majority leader of the opposition
- Amadu Wurie, First Minister of Education of Sierra Leone
- Alpha Wurie, Sierra Leone former minister of Health
- Alhaji Mohamed Bailor Barrie, Prominent Sierra Leonean businessman, tribal leader, activist, and philanthropist in the 1970s and 1980s
- Ibrahim Bah (nickname Inspector Bah), Retired Sierra Leonean footballer
- Ibrahim Bundu, former majority leader of the Sierra Leone Parliament
- Khalifa Jabbie
- Mamadu Alphajor Bah, Sierra Leonean football star
- Mohamed Juldeh Jalloh, current vice president of Sierra Leone
- Momodu Allieu Pat-Sowe, former Transportation minister of Sierra Leone
- Rashid Wurie, former Sierra Leonean international football star
- Sajoh Bah, African languages advocate, author and poet,
- Mohamed Kanu
- Yayah Jalloh

== See also ==
- Koinadugu District
