= Wurie =

Wurie can be a middle name or a surname. Notable people with the name include:

- Mohamed Wurie Jalloh, Sierra Leonean politician
- Amadu Wurie, Sierra Leonean educationalist and politician
- Brima Wurie, person arrested in Boston, Massachusetts, U.S., in 2007 due to a drug sale
- Rashin Wurie (born 1972), Sierra Leonean football midfielder
