= Sheik-Umarr Mikailu Jah =

Sierra Leonean public servant (1935–2024)

Alhaji Dr. med. Sheik-Umarr Mikailu Jah
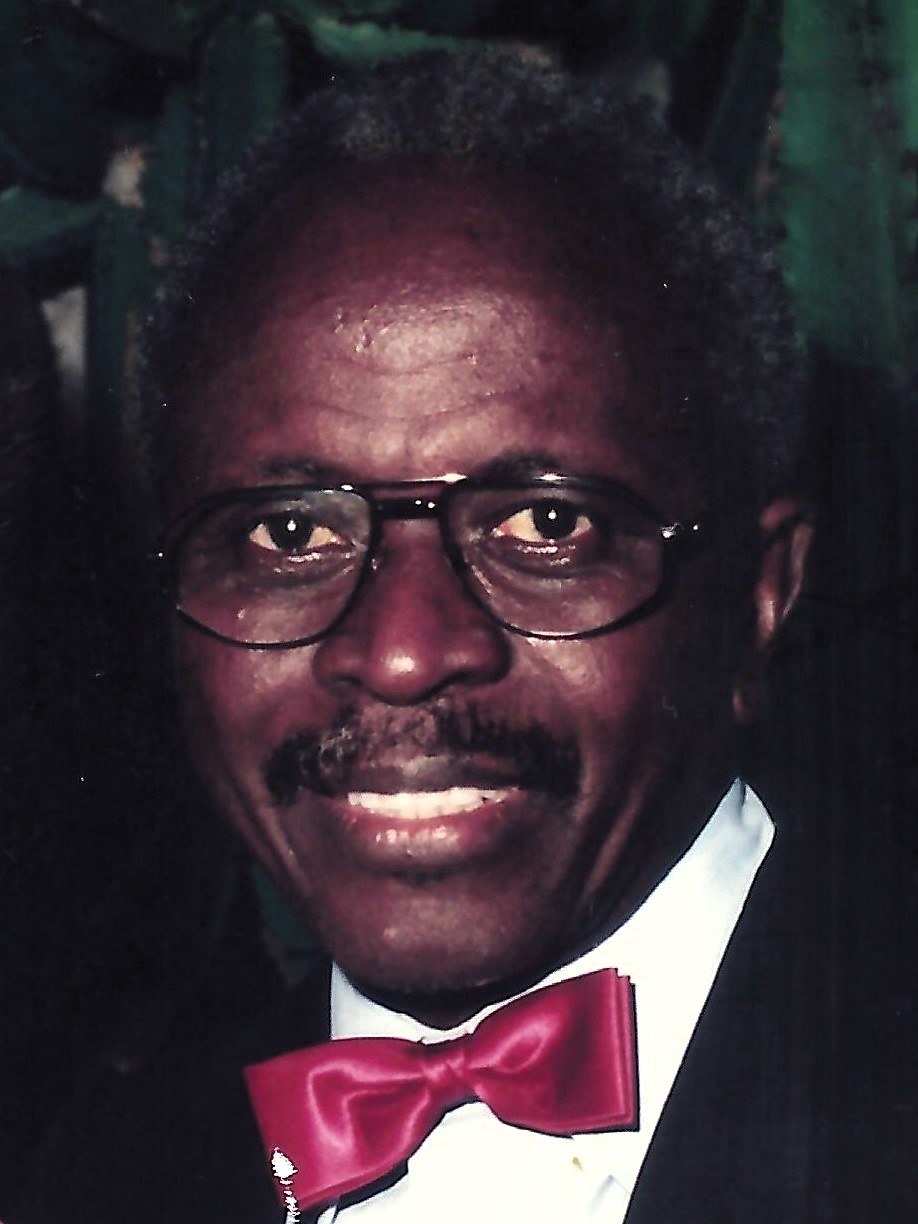
- Jah in 1991

Minister of Health, Sierra Leone
- In office 16 January 1996 – 29 March 1996
- Head of State: Julius Maada Bio
- Preceded by: Jibril
- Succeeded by: Tejan-Jalloh

Minister/Commissioner (Note: The Ministry became a Commission in November 1998, https://www.nacsa.gov.sl/copy-of-home) of National Reconstruction, Resettlement and Rehabilitation, Sierra Leone
- In office 29 March 1996 – 2 November 1999 (Note: Interrupted by coup d'état from 25 May 1997 – 12 February 1998)
- Head of State: Ahmad Tejan Kabbah
- Succeeded by: Kanja Sesay

Minister of Works and Technical Maintenance, Sierra Leone
- In office 2 November 1999 – 2 February 2001
- Head of State: Ahmad Tejan Kabbah

Minister of State for Southern Region, Sierra Leone
- In office 2 February 2001 – 17 September 2007
- Head of State: Ahmad Tejan Kabbah

Personal details
- Born: 22 August 1935 Pujehun, Sierra Leone
- Died: 2 August 2024 (aged 88) Osnabrück, Germany
- Resting place: Pujehun, Sierra Leone
- Party: Sierra Leone People's Party
- Spouse: Betti Elisabeth Beckmann-Jah (m. 1982)
- Children: 2
- Parent(s): Mother: Madam Hawa Bellay Swaray; Father: Mikailu Jah, Paramount Chief of Kpanga Kabonde
- Education: Bo School; University of Bonn
- Profession: Surgeon, politician

Alhaji Dr. med. Sheik-Umarr Mikailu Jah (22 August 1935 – 2 August 2024), commonly known as Dr. S.U.M. Jah, was a Sierra Leonean public servant, trained as a surgeon in Germany and one of the few medical specialists working in Sierra Leone throughout the civil war, and later a politician who served as a minister of Sierra Leone for 11 years, from 1996 to 2007. In 2006 he contracted Lassa fever, was flown to Germany for medical treatment, and never fully recovered. To honor his service, he received a state funeral in Sierra Leone.

== Early life ==
Sheik-Umarr Mikailu Jah was born on 22 August 1935, in Pujehun Hospital, Pujehun District, Southern Province, Sierra Leone. His father was Paramount Chief Mikailu Jah, of Mende and Fula descent, and his mother was Madam Hawa Bellay Swaray, of Mandingo descent. He was delivered by Sir Milton Margai, the first Protectorate Medical Doctor and later the first Prime Minister of Sierra Leone. Born into a Muslim family, Jah learned to recite the Quran in Arabic and practiced Islam throughout his life. However, in order to attend primary school, he was baptized under the name Simion and, as an altar boy, excelled in reciting Christian texts in Latin. Jah, born into a polygamous family, had several brothers and sisters and he was very close to all of them. He had one full sibling, his sister Christiana Salematu Jah (born ~1943, died Dec 2012). In 1983, his brother Abdulai Bu Mikailu Jah succeeded their father as Paramount Chief.

Jah began his primary education at a Quranic school in Pujehun under the guidance of Imam Sidie Yayah Touray from 1944 to 1946, stopping in Yusuf. In 1947 he moved to the Holy Family Primary School in Pujehun, continuing up to Standard 4. He completed Standard 5 and passed the Common Entrance Examination at St. Francis Primary School in Bo in 1950.

For his secondary education, Jah attended the Bo Government Secondary School (commonly known as Bo School), from 1951 to 1959. The school, at that time, was reserved for sons and nominees of Paramount Chiefs. His admission number was 1027. Initially he was at Manchester House, and later at Paris House where he was the Senior Prefect. As a runner he held many longstanding records. Up to Form 5 he completed the Cambridge Higher School Certificate (Marks: “Second Division”). In Form 6 he took exclusively science subjects, completing A-levels in biology, physics, chemistry, and zoology.

He started his career as a science teacher and taught for 3 years in secondary schools: Christ the King's College Bo, Bo School, and Prince of Wales Freetown.

== Medical career ==
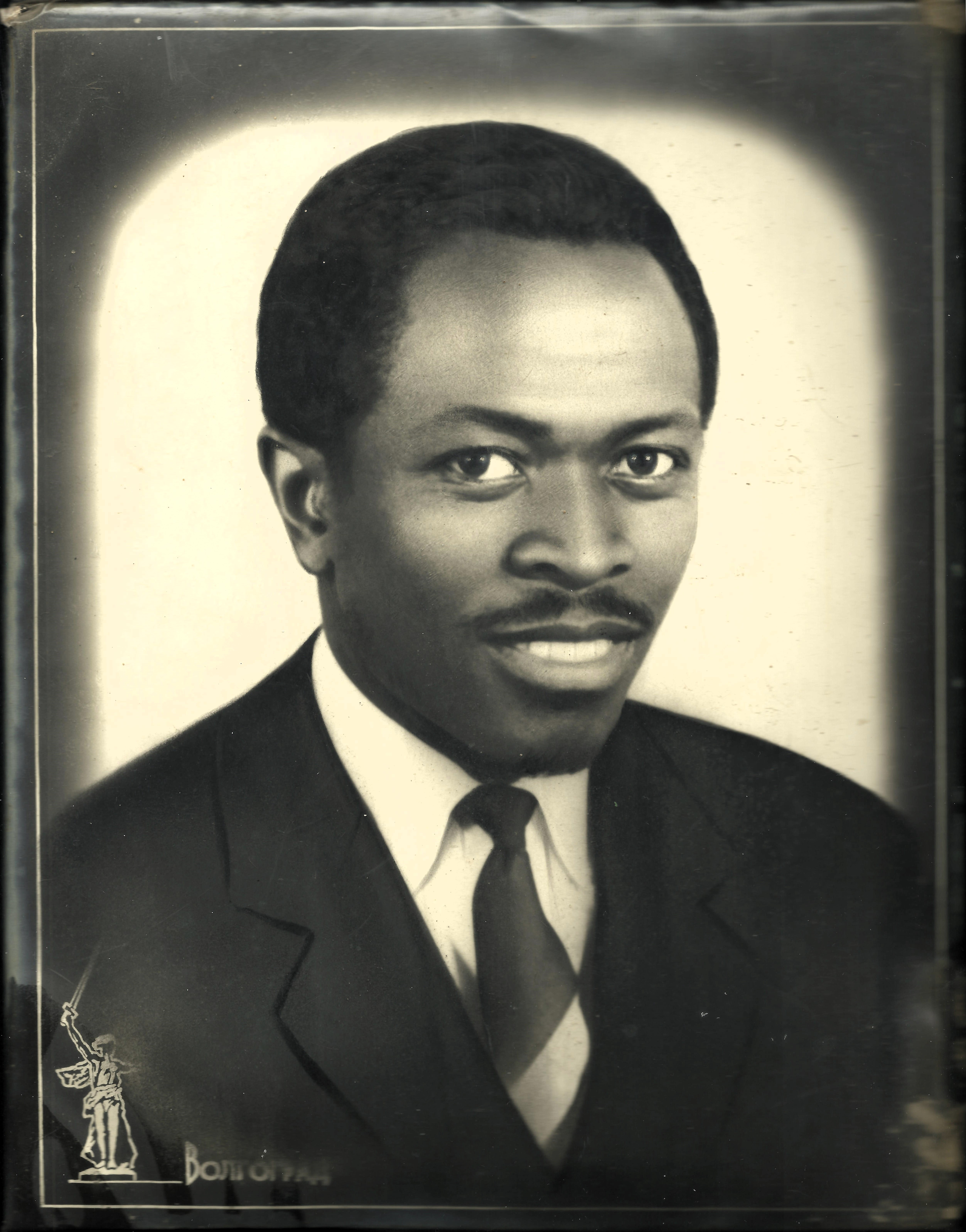
Jah as a final year medical student in Bonn, 1968.

Jah was awarded two scholarships by the Government of Sierra Leone. The first was to study forestry in the United Kingdom, which he declined, and the second was to study medicine in Germany, which he accepted. On 13 December 1961, the year of Sierra Leone's independence, in Freetown he boarded the mail vessel "Apapa" from Lagos. After an eight-day journey, including a stop in Banjul to visit Swaray relatives, he arrived in Liverpool. He then took the Boat Train to London, where he spent New Year's Eve, before flying from Gatwick to Köln Bonn Airport on 2 January 1962. From there, he travelled by train to Bad Aibling, where he completed a four-month German language course at the Goethe-Institut. During this time, he remarked that he “never saw the earth", as it was always covered in snow.

He commenced his medical studies at the University of Bonn, in the summer semester of 1962 and graduated on 19 February 1968, earning a "Note 2" grade in the Staatsexamen. During his studies, he lived at Hermannstraße 1 in Bonn, which was then the capital of West Germany. After completing the Physikum, he spent one semester at Heidelberg University under Professor Lindner, a surgeon.

As a junior house officer (“Medizinalassistent”), Jah worked unpaid for 2 years in Bonn. In 1970, he earned his Doctor of Medicine (Dr. med.) degree with a thesis in ophthalmology titled “Dye detection in tissues and fluids of the bodies and eyes of rabbits after intravenous fluorescein sodium injection”, supervised by Professor Hermann. He graduated with the highest honors, “Note 1, Summa cum laude”.

From 1970 to 1975, he specialized in general surgery with a focus on orthopedics in North Rhine-Westphalia, working under Professor Major, in hospitals across Essen, Solingen, Velbert, Siegburg, and Waldbröl.

He later worked as a senior surgeon in Essen from 1975 to 1979, at Connaught Hospital in Freetown from 1979 to 1981, and at Bo Government Hospital from 1981 to 1996. As a surgeon he performed the first total hip replacement in West Africa and his orthopedic skills were sought after by patients and referring colleagues throughout Sierra Leone and neighboring countries.

Throughout the Sierra Leone Civil War he worked in Sierra Leone serving his people. For two short episodes that he had to flee for his life, he worked for a few months as a visiting surgeon at the Evangelic Hospital Lengerich and in a surgery in Püsselbüren, Germany.

== Political career ==
Jah was a long-time member of the Sierra Leone People's Party and served as its Deputy National Chairman for two terms from 2001 to 2004, under Dr. Sama Banya and Alhadji U. N.S. Jah. He was described as "the people's servant who has over the years championed their cause" and was recognized for the "respect and love he has for his people".

After serving as the chairman of the National Power Authority, he was appointed Minister of Health in the interim government of Julius Maada Bio, holding the position from 16 January 1996 to 29 March 1996.

Following the election of President Ahmad Tejan Kabbah, Jah became the inaugural Minister of National Reconstruction, Resettlement and Rehabilitation. He held this post until November 1998 when the ministry was transformed into a commission, where Jah served as Commissioner until 2 November 1999. His work was interrupted by a coup d'état from 25 May 1997 to 12 February 1998. In his role, Jah made significant contributions to Sierra Leone's post-civil war reconstruction, including reporting to the United Nations: "urgent support was also needed for the return, resettlement and reintegration of nearly 500,000 Sierra Leonean refugees in Guinea and Liberia" and "that over 3,000 villages and towns destroyed by the Revolutionary United Front (RUF) guerrillas and 1,700 educational facilities, 400 health centres and 3,000 wells needed to be rehabilitated or rebuilt."

Jah subsequently served as Minister of Works and Technical Maintenance from 2 November 1999 to 2 February 2001.

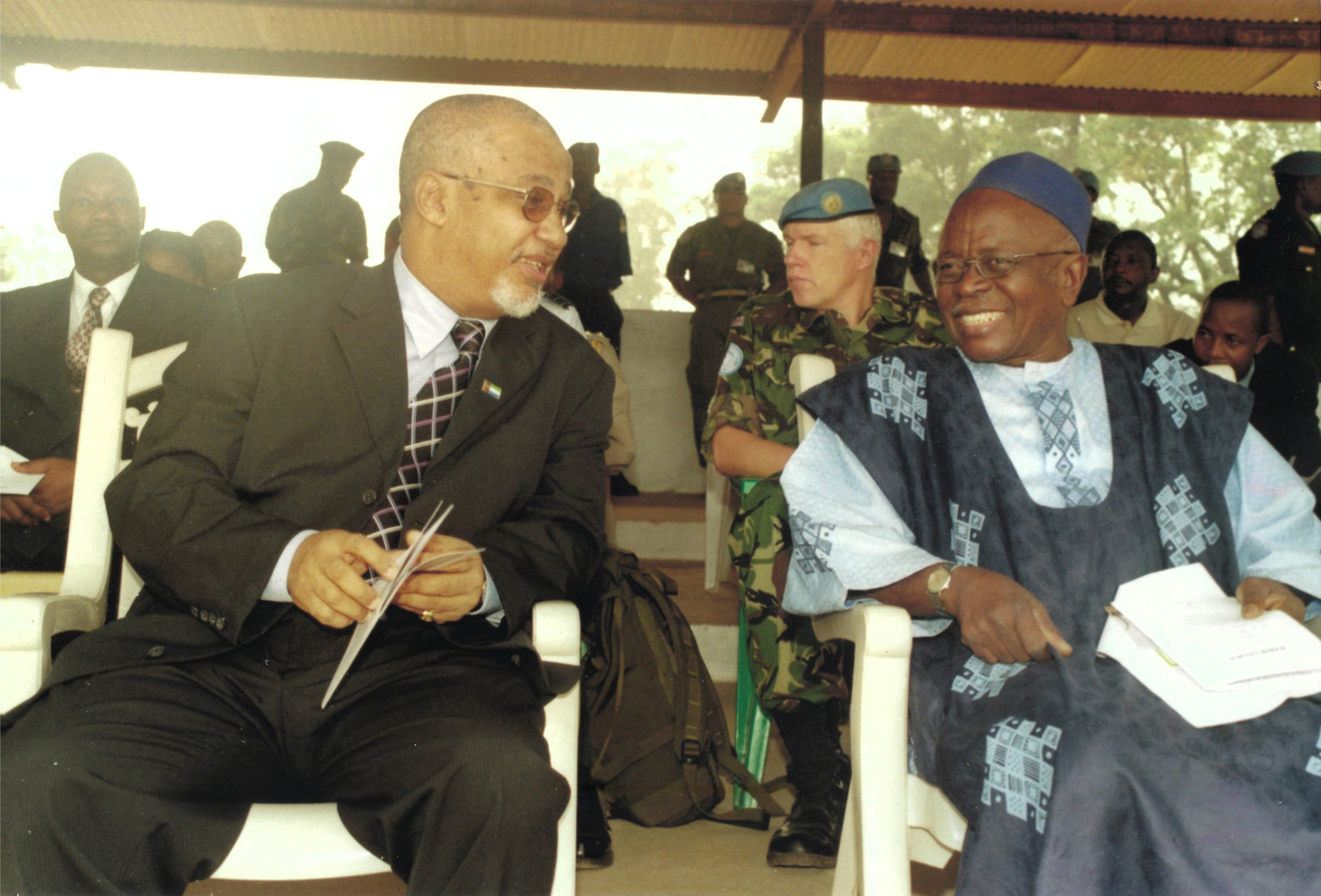
Jah, Minister of State for Southern Region 2001-2007

He later became the Minister of State for the Southern Region, a position he held from 2 February 2001 until 17 September 2007.

== Public service ==
In the early 1950s, Jah was a founding member of what later would be renamed to the Pujehun District Development Association to promote the development of Pujehun District. It has active branches in Sierra Leone, the United States, Canada, the United Kingdom, Ireland, and Germany.

For several years, including 1986, Jah was the Chairman of the Kakua Rangers Football Club and the Bo District Football Association.

In 1987, Jah and his wife co-founded Paupers' Kitchen and Clinic (PKC), a community-based organization in Bo to provide nutritious meals, medical care and educational support to the most vulnerable members of the community. During the civil war the project house served as shelter for people from Pujehun. Since 2010, annually tens of children of PKC members receive school scholarships, of which two entered university in 2024. PKC conducts regular workshops in health education and traditional handicraft, such as weaving. In 2016, PKC organized two international medical missions in both Bo and Pujehun. Throughout the years, Jah, his wife Beckmann-Jah, and mother-in-law Gertrud Beckmann (1912–2009) actively raised funds in Germany.

In 1988, Jah was a founding member of the Rotary Club of Bo, Sierra Leone.

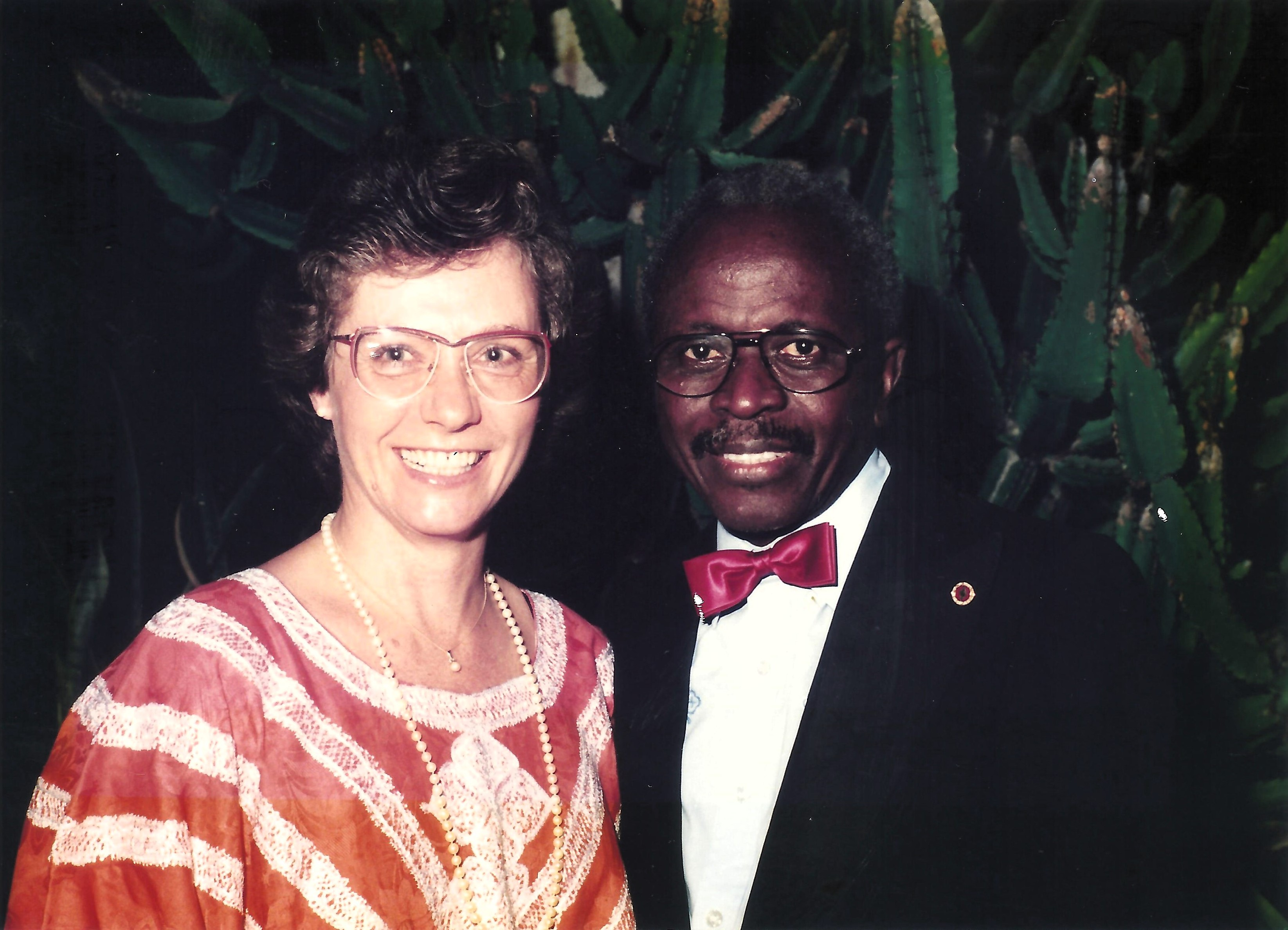
Jah in 1991 with his wife Betti Elisabeth Beckmann-Jah

Between 1991 and 1993, Jah served as president of the Sierra Leone Medical & Dental Association.

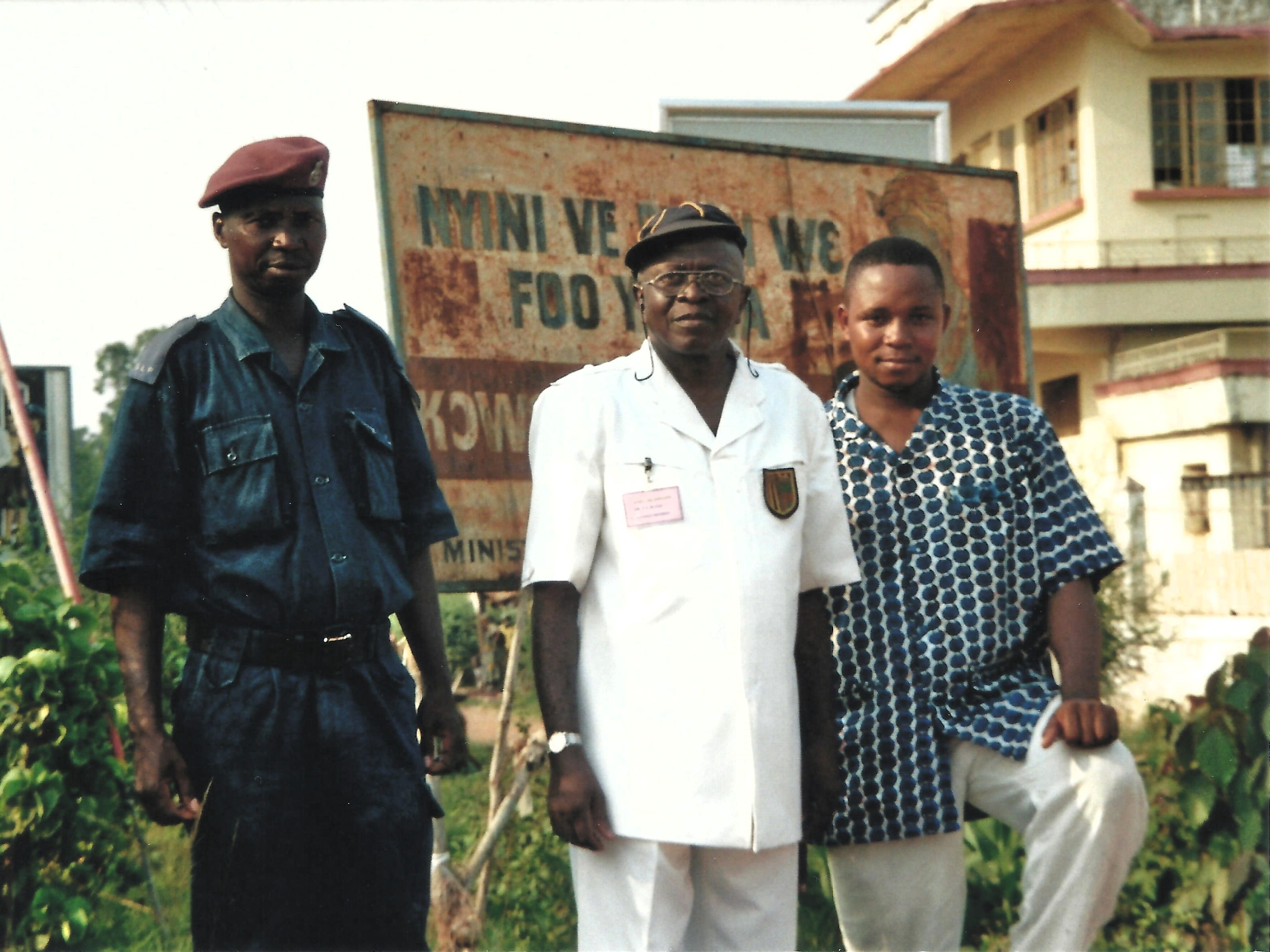
Jah attending OBBA

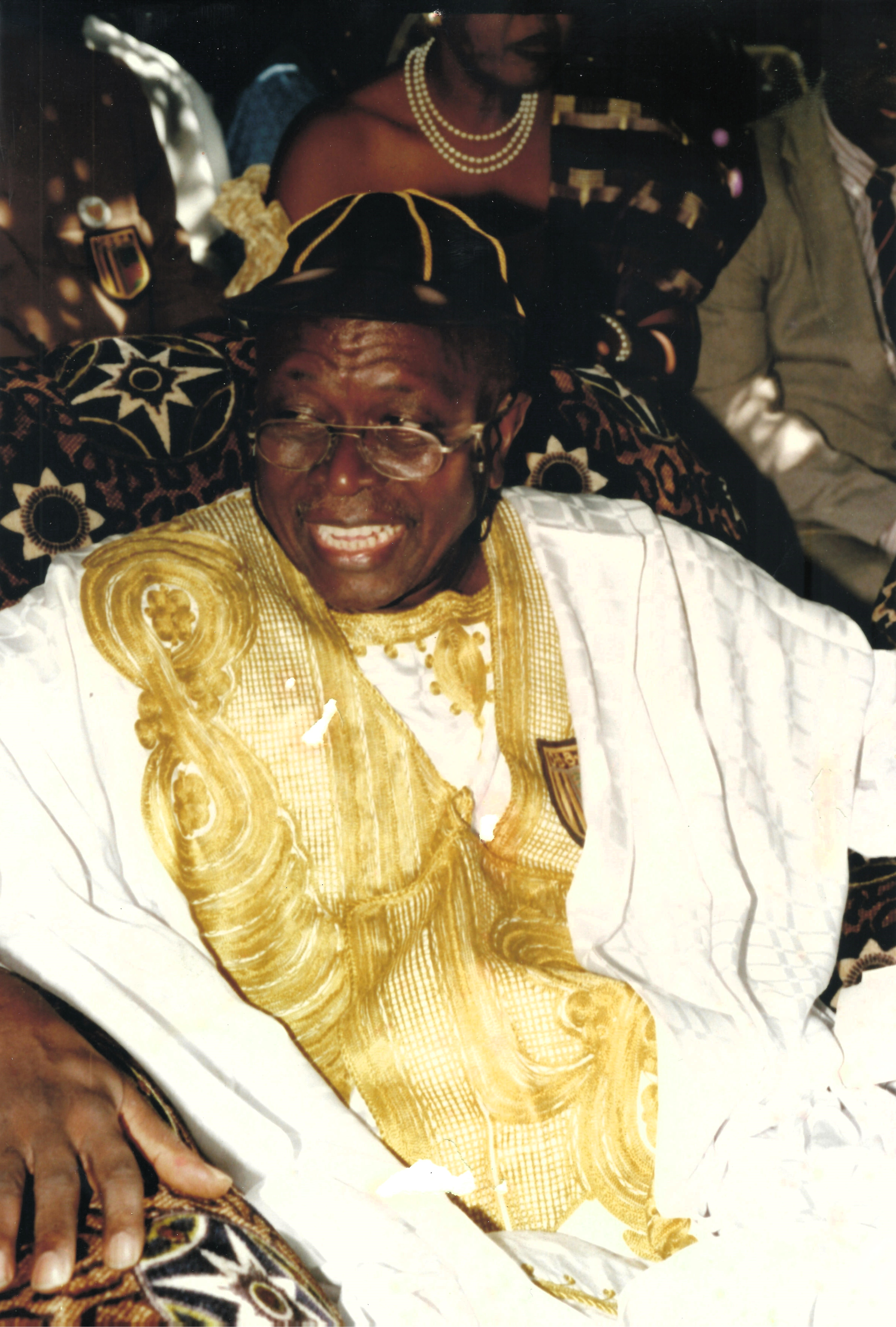
Jah as President of OBBA.

For two terms, from 2001 to 2004, Jah was president of the Old Bo Boys Association (OBBA), the alumni association of the prestigious Bo Government Secondary School in Sierra Leone.

== Personal life ==
Sheik-Umarr Mikailu Jah met Betti Elisabeth Beckmann-Jah at the “Kaiser Café” in Bonn on 13 February 1968, the day of his final medical exam. They married on 19 November 1982 in Lienen, Germany. Together, they had one daughter, Hawanatu Bettina Daniela Jah, and from a previous relationship Jah had another daughter, Zainab Valerie Adenikeh Jah.

Jah and his wife moved back to Sierra Leone in 1979. Their daughter was born in 1982 during a temporary stay in Germany. The family lived together in Sierra Leone until April 1991, when his wife and daughter fled to Germany due to the rebel invasion during the civil war. In November 1991, Jah travelled to Germany and brought them back home to Sierra Leone. However, in 1992, his wife and daughter returned to Germany for health reasons, where they stayed due to the ongoing war and instability in Sierra Leone.

In 1994, Jah was warned by the late M.G. Sillah that Revolutionary United Front soldiers were searching for him with the intent of making him a minister. In the night his nephew Abdul went to Freetown to get Jah's passport. Jah fled the next day, disguised as a market lady, in the back row of a podapoda. At a checkpoint, one of the policemen in charge recognized him as their doctor and allowed him to pass despite receiving orders to detain him. Jah then crossed into Guinea, staying overnight at the border, before continuing to Germany.

In 2001, Jah completed the Hajj pilgrimage to Mecca.

In July 2006, he contracted Lassa fever encephalitis and was flown to Germany by his wife for medical treatment, initially thought to be suffering from cerebral malaria. After a short admission to the Munster University Hospital, where Lassa fever was diagnosed, he was transferred to Frankfurt University Hospital for high-level isolation intensive care. Jah remained in a coma from July to October 2006 and was discharged from hospital just before Christmas of that year. In January 2007, he began rehabilitation at Clinic Hilchenbach. Although he never fully recovered, he regained the ability to walk along the hallway, converse and use the computer. For 16 years, his wife Betti cared for him at their home in Lienen. During this period, under medical supervision, Jah made five more trips to Sierra Leone, with his last visit in 2017. His planned trip in 2020 was cancelled due to the COVID-19 pandemic.

He died on 2 August 2024 at Klinikum Osnabrück following several large brain infarctions. He is survived by his wife Madam Betti Elisabeth Beckmann-Jah, together for 56 years, and their daughter Dr Hawanatu Bettina Daniela Jah, his son-in-law Prof Menno Roderick Smit and his grandchildren Malika Bae Amelia Smit-Jah, Kailu Fredrik Oleander Smit-Jah and Nyota Elisabeth Atlantis Smit-Jah, by his daughter Zainab Valerie Adenikeh Jah and his son-in-law Timothy Sean Naylor. Furthermore he is survived by several brothers, sisters, in-laws, nieces, nephews, colleagues, friends and relatives in his homes in Sierra Leone, Germany and abroad. He received a state funeral on 28 August 2024 in Freetown, which was followed by a laying out ceremony at Bo School on 29 August 2024 and burial on 30 August 2024 in Pujehun.
