= Ibrahim Fofanah =

Sierra Leonean footballer

Personal information
- Full name: Ibrahim K. Fofanah
- Date of birth: 13 February 1994 (age 32)
- Place of birth: Sierra Leone
- Height: 1.78 m (5 ft 10 in)
- Position: Forward

Team information
- Current team: Syrianska Kerburan
- Number: 15

Senior career*
Years	Team	Apps	(Gls)
- Wellington People
2011	→ Kamboi Eagles (loan)	13	(8)
2012	FC Kallon	2	(0)
2012–2013	Djurgårdens IF	0	(0)
2013	→ Arameiska-Syrianska (loan)	14	(5)
2014	HamKam	10	(0)
2014	Oskarshamns AIK		
2015–	Syrianska Kerburan		

International career^{‡}
2012	Sierra Leone	1	(0)
- * Club domestic league appearances and goals as of 05:22, 28 February 2025 (UTC) ‡ National team caps and goals as of 05:22, 28 February 2025 (UTC)

Ibrahim K. Fofanah, also known as Ike Fofanah (born 13 February 1994) is a Sierra Leonean international footballer who plays professionally for Swedish club Syrianska IF Kerburan as a forward.

== Club career ==
Fofanah played for Kamboi Eagles, Wellington People and FC Kallon in Sierra Leone. In 2011, he was the Sierra Leone National Premier League top goal scorer with eight goals during the thirteen game season as well as voted best player of the league. He was also one of three nominees for the "2011 Sierra Leone Best Player" award, alongside European based players Teteh Bangura and Mohamed Bangura.

Despite suffering from a broken leg injury at the start of his time with FC Kallon, he was still signed by Swedish club Djurgården who brought him to Sweden to help with his rehabilitation. In October 2013 Djurgården announced that they would not be extending Fofanah's contract and that he would leave the club at the end of the year. He then signed for Norwegian club HamKam in 2014. He then played for Oskarshamns AIK in Division 1.

In 2015, Fofanah joined Syrianska Kerburan from Oskarshamns AIK.

== International career ==
He made his international debut for Sierra Leone in 2012.
