= Kelfala Marah =

Sierra Leonean footballer

Personal information
- Full name: Kelfala Pekin Marah
- Date of birth: 7 July 1984 (age 42)
- Place of birth: Koidu Town, Sierra Leone
- Height: 1.75 m (5 ft 9 in)
- Position: Attacking midfielder

Senior career*
Years	Team	Apps	(Gls)
2000–2001	Mighty Blackpool		
2001–2002	East End Lions		
2002–2003	Kallon		
2003	Željezničar Sarajevo	0	(0)
2003	→ Bosna Visoko (loan)		
2004–2005	Čukarički	15	(1)
2005	→ Rudar Kostolac (loan)	13	(7)
2005	Reymersholms IK		
2006–2007	Rudar Kostolac		
2007-2008	Panellinios IF	14	(2)
2008-8009	Älvsjö AIK	22	(2)
2012	Reymersholms IK	2	(0)
2014	Danderyds SK	1	(0)
2021	Danderyds United FC	7	(0)

International career
2000–2001	Sierra Leone	2	(0)
- * Club domestic league appearances and goals

Kelfala Marah (born 7 July 1984) is a Sierra Leonian former professional footballer who played as an attacking midfielder. He made two appearances for the Sierra Leone national team.

== Club career ==
Marah arrived in Europe in the summer of 2003 after playing with Mighty Blackpool F.C., East End Lions F.C. and FC Kallon. In September 2002 he was priced as the most expensive player in the Sierra Leone National Premier League.

He first came to Sarajevo where he signed FK Željezničar Sarajevo in the Premier League of Bosnia and Herzegovina but was loaned to another Bosnian club, NK Bosna Visoko playing with them in the first half of the second level, the 2003–04 First League of the Federation of Bosnia and Herzegovina season.

During winter-break, he moved to Belgrade where he played in the First League of Serbia and Montenegro club FK Čukarički. The following winter break, he was loaned to a third-level Serbian League East club FK Rudar Kostolac to get more chances to play.

Next season he moved to Sweden to play with Reymersholms IK. He would later also play with Swedish clubs Älvsjö AIK and Danderyds SK, and in 2021 Danderyds United FC in the Swedish 9th tier.

== International career ==
Marah was part of the Sierra Leone national team from the 2002 World Cup qualifiers.

== Honors ==
Mighty Blackpool

- Sierra Leone National Premier League: 2000, 2001
- Sierra Leonean FA Cup: 2000

Čukarički

- Second League of Serbia and Montenegro: 2003–04
