= Education in Sierra Leone =

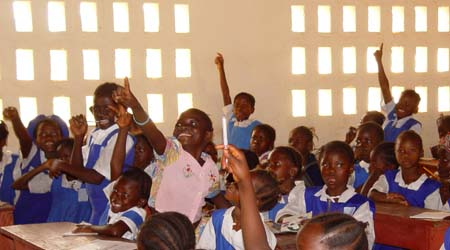
A second grade class in Koidu

Education in Sierra Leone is legally required for all children for six years at primary level and three years in junior secondary education, but a shortage of schools and teachers has made implementation impossible. The Sierra Leone Civil War resulted in the destruction of 1,270 primary schools and in 2001 67 percent of all school-age children were out of school. The situation has improved considerably since then with primary school enrollment doubling between 2001 and 2005 and the reconstruction of many schools since the end of the war. However, there is still a long ways to go. In 2004, Junior secondary school enrollment was only 17% of primary school enrollment, and senior secondary school enrollment was only 8% of primary school education.

The Human Rights Measurement Initiative (HRMI) finds that Sierra Leone is fulfilling only 84.3% of what it should be fulfilling for the right to education based on the country's level of income. HRMI breaks down the right to education by looking at the rights to both primary education and secondary education. While taking into consideration Sierra Leone's income level, the nation is achieving 100.0% of what should be possible based on its resources (income) for primary education but only 68.6% for secondary education.

== History ==
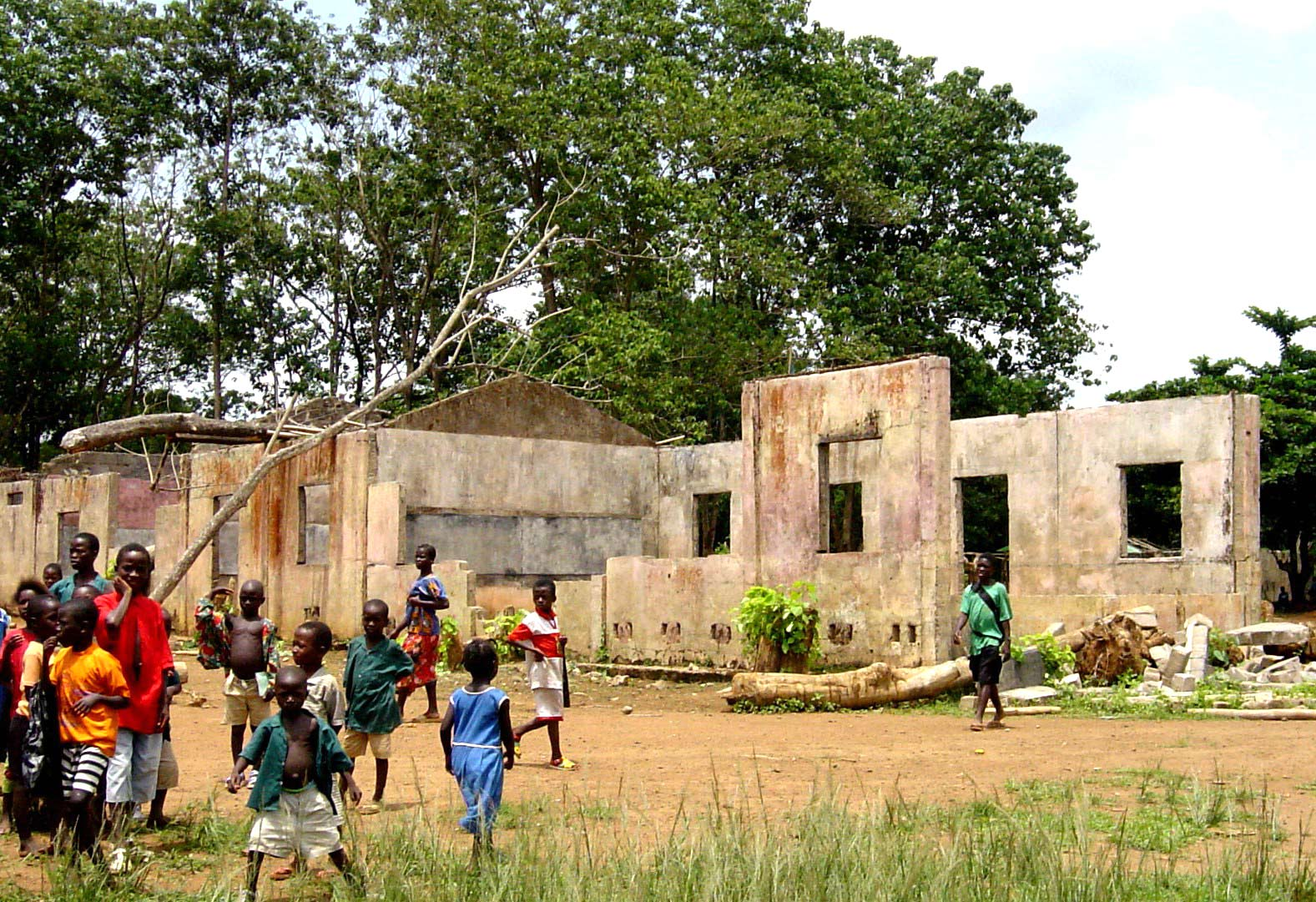
The remains of a school in Koindu damaged during the Sierra Leone Civil War by RUF rebel forces

During the nineteenth century, Sierra Leone was a pioneer of western-style education in sub-Saharan Africa. Fourah Bay College, affiliated with Durham University in the United Kingdom, was founded in 1827 as the first tertiary educational institute in the region. The first boys school, Sierra Leone Grammar School, and the first girls school, Annie Walsh Memorial School, were founded in 1845 and 1849 respectively. The country was an important centre in training teachers, doctors and administrators for whole of West Africa in the first half of the nineteenth century.

The education system that developed in Sierra Leone during the nineteenth and twentieth century was styled on the British education system. It was elitist in nature aimed at urban middle class and focused on the academically gifted who would go on to tertiary education before taking up positions as civil servants in the government. During this period the majority of the population were not formally educated or only a couple of years of primary education. When Sierra Leone declared independence in 1961, under 15% of children aged five to eleven and only five percent of 12- to 16-year-olds attended school.

After independence there was pressure to change the education system, but it wasn't until the 1990s that this grew to the level that led to changes in the system. Reforms were proposed so that the education system would serve the social economic needs of the country more closely, centering on increasing access to education, particularly primary education and placing more emphasis on technical and vocational education. In 1993 the government adopted a four-stage approach to education and created the National Commission for Basic Education.

During the 1990s the Sierra Leone Civil War set these goals back destroying much of the country's infrastructure including schools; for example, 1,270 primary schools were destroyed. This created a shortage in schools which was compounded by a shortage in teachers and so made the legal requirement of universal basic education for all children difficult to obtain. At the end of the war in 2001 67 percent of school-age children were out of school.

The generation of child soldiers that came out of the Sierra Leone Civil War also set these goals back, as they had to be reintegrated into their community. There are thousands of former soldiers in Sierra Leone that have a hard time reintegrating into their communities after experiencing the atrocities of war. Almost 7,000 child soldiers were demobilized during the UN Mission in Sierra Leone (UNAMSIL). At the end of the war, disarmament, demobilization, and reintegration programs (DDR) were introduced to the country. These programs aim to socialize the children in a way that prepares them to return to their communities. The Complementary Rapid Education for Primary Schools (CREPS) program serves children age 16 and older, and at its peak, served 11,663 children from 2002 to 2003. Another DDR program, the Rapid Response Education Program (RREP), ended in 2002 after providing for 7,115 children at its peak from 2001 to 2002. Although the DDR programs in Sierra Leone work towards the reintegration of the generation of child soldiers, there is little evidence to date that long-term reintegration has occurred as a direct result from them.

== Structure ==
Sierra Leone's education system is divided into four stages; primary education lasting six years, junior secondary education of three years, three years of either senior secondary education or technical vocational education and four years of university or other tertiary education.

The 2004 Education act abolished school fees for all children at primary school and at junior secondary school for girls in the northern and eastern areas. Fees were also abolished for the National Primary School Examination (NPSE) that is taken at the end of primary school which, along with the increase in school enrollment, led to 78,000 students taking the exam in 2005 compared with 26,000 in 2001. The NPSE is designed by the West African Examination Council and has to be passed in order to progress to secondary education.

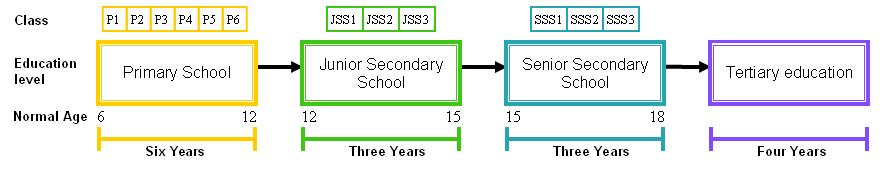
The structure of education in Sierra Leone

=== Primary education ===
The number of children receiving primary education has greatly increased since the end of the civil war. However, in 2007, there were still more than 240,000 children, about 25%-30% of the population of this age group, not receiving education. The rate of completion of primary education is also low with only 64% of children completing their primary education during 2004/05. The educational attainment of girls is below this level partly due to cultural beliefs in some areas of Sierra Leone that do not support the education of girls.

Primary education statistics by district for 2007
Measure	Bo	Bombali	Bonthe	Kailahun	Kambia	Kenema	Koinadugu	Kono	Moyamba	Port Loko	Pujehun	Tonkolili
Number of primary schools	462	437	141	310	294	559	278	236	438	463	291	489
Schools in good condition	302	274	100	119	unknown	302	57	195	unknown	unknown	95	144
Primary enrollment	148,538	121,731	40,728	87,124	45,653	171,885	69,424	67,907	93,497	144,858	71,120	113,926
Male enrollment	77,473	66,237	21,238	45,992	unknown	89,948	38,152	35,240	49,031	73,639	38,328	59,410
Female enrollment	71,065	57,232	19,490	41,132	unknown	81,937	31,272	32,667	44,466	71,219	32,792	54,516
Number of primary teachers	1,597	2,212	632	1,624	unknown	3,135	907	710	1,918	1,595	1,001	2,379
Qualified primary teachers	1,293	898	213	698	unknown	1,589	163	255	582	838	300	683

=== Secondary education ===
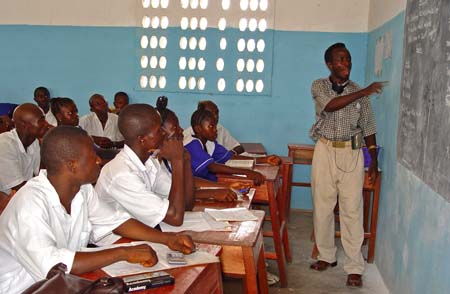
A secondary school class in Pendembu.

Secondary school examinations in government-funded schools (and many private schools) are coordinated by the West African Examinations Council. This council implements the Basic Education Certificate Examination and the West African Senior School Certificate Examination.

=== Tertiary education ===
There are two universities in Sierra Leone: the University of Sierra Leone, founded as Fourah Bay College in 1827; and Njala University which was established as the Njala Agricultural Experimental Station in 1910 and became a university in 2005.

In addition, The Evangelical College of Theology, founded in 1964, is accredited by the University of Sierra Leone and the Tertiary Education Committee for both the Diploma and Bachelor level.

== Adult education ==
Sierra Leone has a low level of literacy among adults with only 37.1% of adults literate in 2006, the level of literacy is higher among 15- to 24-year-old who have a literacy rate of 52.2%. For both groups literacy among women is much lower than that for men. Attendance within the education system is also low among adults with men averaging 4 years of formal education and women 2 years.

== See also ==
Education finance in Sierra Leone

== Bibliography ==
- Wang, Lianqin (2007). Education in Sierra Leone: Present Challenges, Future Opportunities, World Bank Publications, ISBN 0-8213-6868-0
