= José Salomon Cortés =

Chilean football manager

Personal information
- Full name: José Miguel Salomon Cortés
- Date of birth: 11 March 1972 (age 54)
- Place of birth: Vina del Mar, Chile

Team information
- Current team: Sierra Leone Football Association Video Analyst, Sierra Leone National Team & Head Coach Sierra Leone B15 National Team

Managerial career
- Years: Team
- 2010-2013: AIK (Head Coach Academy)
- 2014-2017: Hammarby (Head Coach Academy)
- 2017–2019: Vasalund (Head of Academy)
- 2020: Vasalund (International Scout, first team)
- 2021: Académie Soar (Guinea, Ligue 1)
- 2021–2023: Bo Rangers (Sierra Leone, Premier League)

José Miguel Salomon Cortés (born 11 March 1972), known as José Salomon Cortés, is a Chilean-Swedish football manager.

== Early life ==
Salomon Cortés was born in Valparaíso, Chile, and lived in Viña del Mar, the neighboring commune. He moved to Germany at the age of two before made his home in Sweden.

== Career ==
As a football manager, Salomon Cortés gets a UEFA licence.

He has worked for both Aston Villa and Chelsea as a scouting agent in recruitment of youth players from Africa and Scandinavia, taking part of the development of footballers such as Nathan Aké, Callum Hudson-Odoi, Kurt Zouma and the Chalobah brothers.

In Sweden, he has worked for the youth systems of AIK, Hammarby and Vasalund.

In 2020 he performed as coach of Vasalund and won the 2020 Ettan Norra and got promotion to the Superettan.

He also has personally trained players such as Williot Swedberg and Amadou Diawara.

He spent a year in Guinea coaching at Académie Soar before joining Sierra Leonean club Bo Rangers on 6 September 2021 as head coach, alongside the Guinean goalkeeping coach Allan Sekou Kamata and both Alhaji Foray and Kabineh Kamara as assistants.

He won the 2021–22 season of the Sierra Leone National Premier League and got qualification to the 2022–23 CAF Champions League. He also was honored as the Coach of the Season.

He left Bo Rangers on 17 January 2023.

== Honours ==
Vasalund

- Ettan Norra: 2020

Bo Rangers

- Sierra Leone National Premier League: 2021–22
