= 1979 African Cup Winners' Cup =

Tournament details
- Dates: April - 9 December 1979
- Teams: 28 (from 1 confederation)

Final positions
- Champions: (Cameroon) Canon Yaoundé (1st title)
- Runners-up: (Kenya) Gor Mahia

Tournament statistics
- Matches played: 48
- Goals scored: 124 (2.58 per match)

The 1978 season of the African Cup Winners' Cup football club tournament was won by Canon Yaoundé in two-legged final victory against Gor Mahia. This was the fifth season that the tournament took place for the winners of each African country's domestic cup. Twenty-eight sides entered the competition, with USCA Bangui, Al Ittihad El Iskandary, Al Nil Wad Medani withdrawing before 1st leg of the first round. No preliminary round took place during this season of the competition.

== First round ==
| Team 1 | Agg. | Team 2 | 1st leg | 2nd leg |
|---|---|---|---|---|
| Al Nasr (Benghazi) (Libya) | w/o | (Central African Republic) TP USCA Bangui | — | — |
| Bendel Insurance F.C. (Nigeria) | 6-1 | (Gabon) Petrosport FC | 1-0 | 5-1 |
| Espoirs (Mauritania) | 1-1 (4-5 p) | (The Gambia) Wallidan F.C. | 1-0 | 0-1 |
| SC Gagnoa (Ivory Coast) | 4-1 | (Liberia) Cedar United | 3-1 | 1-0 |
| Gor Mahia (Kenya) | w/o | (Egypt) Al Ittihad Alexandria | — | — |
| Kadiogo FC (Republic of Upper Volta) | 1-1 (4-2 p) | (Ghana) Asante Kotoko | 1-0 | 0-1 |
| Maseru United (Lesotho) | 6-6 (a) | (Botswana) Notwane FC | 2-1 | 4-5 |
| CD Maxaquene (Mozambique) | 0-4 | (Madagascar) AS Sotema | 0-3 | 0-1 |
| Nsambya FC (Uganda) | w/o | (Sudan) Al Neel SC | — | — |
| Pan African FC (Tanzania) | 1-1 (5-4 p) | (Ethiopia) Omedla | 1-0 | 0-1 |
| Deportivo Mongomo (Equatorial Guinea) | 2-8 | (Cameroon) Canon Yaoundé | 1-3 | 1-5 |
| Internacional (Guinea-Bissau) | 2-3 | (Sierra Leone) Bai Bureh Warriors | 1-1 | 1-2 |
| CM Belcourt (Algeria) | bye | | | |
| Horoya AC (Guinea) | bye | | | |
| Requins de l'Atlantique FC (Benin) | bye | | | |
| AS Vita Club (Zaire) | bye | | | |

== Second round ==
| Team 1 | Agg. | Team 2 | 1st leg | 2nd leg |
|---|---|---|---|---|
| Bai Bureh Warriors (Sierra Leone) | 0-4 | (Guinea) Horoya AC | 0-1 | 0-3 |
| Bendel Insurance F.C. (Nigeria) | 2-0 | (Ivory Coast) SC Gagnoa | 1-0 | 1-0 |
| CM Belcourt (Algeria) | 5-2 | (Libya) Al-Nasr (Benghazi) | 4-2 | 1-0 |
| Gor Mahia (Kenya) | 1-1 (a) | (Uganda) Nsambya FC | 0-0 | 1-1 |
| Kadiogo FC (Republic of Upper Volta) | 4-2 | (Benin) Requins de l'Atlantique FC | 3-1 | 1-1 |
| Maseru United (Lesotho) | 1-5 | (Madagascar) AS Sotema | 0-1 | 1-4 |
| Pan African FC (Tanzania) | 2-2 (a) | (Zaire) AS Vita Club | 2-1 | 0-1 |
| Wallidan F.C. (The Gambia) | 1-3 | (Cameroon) Canon Yaoundé | 1-2 | 0-1 |

== Quarterfinals ==
| Team 1 | Agg. | Team 2 | 1st leg | 2nd leg |
|---|---|---|---|---|
| AS Sotema (Madagascar) | 2-2 (3-5 p) | (Nigeria) Bendel Insurance F.C. | 2-0 | 0-2 |
| CM Belcourt (Algeria) | 1-6 | (Guinea) Horoya AC | 0-3 | 1-3 |
| Kadiogo FC (Republic of Upper Volta) | 2-4 | (Kenya) Gor Mahia | 1-2 | 1-2 |
| AS Vita Club (Zaire) | 4-7 | (Cameroon) Canon Yaoundé | 3-1 | 1-6 |

== Semifinals ==
| Team 1 | Agg. | Team 2 | 1st leg | 2nd leg |
|---|---|---|---|---|
| Canon Yaoundé (Cameroon) | 1-0 | (Nigeria) Bendel Insurance F.C. | 1-0 | 0-0 |
| Gor Mahia (Kenya) | 3-0 | (Guinea) Horoya AC | 1-0 | 2-0 |

== Final ==
| Team 1 | Agg. | Team 2 | 1st leg | 2nd leg |
|---|---|---|---|---|
| Gor Mahia (Kenya) | 0-8 | (Cameroon) Canon Yaoundé | 0-2 | 0-6 |

African Cup Winners' Cup Winners
(Cameroon)
Canon Yaoundé
First title
