= Bo School =

Bo Government Secondary School
- Bo; Sierra Leone

Information
- Type: Public School
- Motto: Manners Maketh Man
- Religious affiliations: Both Christian and Muslim rites are observed in the school, but the school is secular.
- Established: 1906
- Gender: Boys
- Age: 11 to 18

The Bo Government Secondary School, commonly known as Bo School, is a secondary school located on a 13.5 acres (5.5 ha) property in the center of Bo, the second largest city in Sierra Leone. The school was founded in 1906 at the behest of the British colonial governor, Leslie Probyn, to educate the sons of Paramount Chiefs or nominees of Paramount Chiefs. The school later evolved to become a public school that is open to boys from all backgrounds.

Bo school is a boys-only boarding school. The pupils live in the four dormitory buildings (called Towns) on the school's campus. The four dormitories are called Manchester, London, Liverpool, and Paris respectively—the first three are named after famous cities in England, and the last is named after capital of France.

== Notable pupils ==
- Ibrahim Inspector Bah, Sierra Leonean football star and former captain of Leone Stars
- John Amadu Bangura, Chief of the Defence Staff of the Sierra Leone Armed Forces from 1968 to 1970.
- Julius Maada Bio, President of Sierra Leone since 2018
- Aluspah Brewah, footballer
- Albert Joe Demby, Vice President of Sierra Leone from 1996 to 2002
- Victor Bockarie Foh, Vice President of Sierra Leone from 2015 to 2018
- Sheik-Umarr Mikailu Jah, Former Minister of Sierra Leone from 1996 to 2007
- Salia Jusu-Sheriff, Vice President of Sierra Leone from 1987 to 1991
- Sorie Ibrahim Koroma, Vice President of Sierra Leone from 1971 to 1986
- Paul Kpaka, footballer
- Tamba Lamina, diplomat and politician
- Kanja Sesay, politician
- Banja Tejan-Sie, Sierra Leonean politician and one of the founding members of the Sierra Leone People's Party (SLPP).
- Julius Wobay, footballer
- Amadu Wurie, Sierra Leonean educationist and politician.
