= Mustapha Bangura =

Sierra Leonean footballer (born 1989)

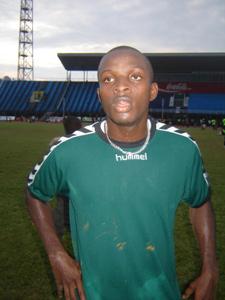
- Bangura in 2008

Personal information
- Date of birth: 24 October 1989 (age 37)
- Place of birth: Freetown, Sierra Leone
- Height: 5 ft 10 in (1.78 m)
- Position: Attacking midfielder

Team information
- Current team: AEZ Zakakiou
- Number: 20

Senior career*
Years	Team	Apps	(Gls)
2004–2006	Old Edwardians		
2006–2008	Nea Salamis Famagusta	45	(9)
2008–2009	Omonia	7	(2)
2009	→ AEP Paphos (loan)	5	(0)
2009–2010	→ Apollon Limassol (loan)	24	(6)
2010–2012	Apollon Limassol	47	(16)
2012–2013	AEK Larnaca	8	(1)
2014	Nikos & Sokratis Erimis	8	(2)
2015–2016	Aris Limassol	16	(1)
2016	Borac Čačak	10	(1)
2016–2017	Zemun	5	(0)
2017	Rodos	10	(3)
2018	Enosi Panaspropyrgiakou Doxas	8	(1)
2018	AO Episkopi	5	(0)
2019–	AEZ Zakakiou	15	(3)

International career
2005–2016	Sierra Leone	17	(4)
- * Club domestic league appearances and goals as of 1 August 2019

Mustapha Bangura (born 24 October 1989) is a Sierra Leonean footballer who plays as an attacking midfielder for AEZ Zakakiou.

== Club career ==
Bangura was born in Freetown, Sierra Leone. In 2005, he joined Old Edwardians in the Sierra Leone National Premier League. He spent a season with Edwards before he moved to Europe and joined the Cyprus First Division club Nea Salamis Famagusta in 2006. In 2008, he joined Omonia. The next year he moved to Apollon Limassol and he helped the team to win the 2009–10 Cypriot Cup, scoring also the opening goal of the final. In 2012, he joined AEK on a two-year deal. In 2014 with joined Nikos & Sokratis Erimis. In the summer of 2015, Bangura joined newly promoted Aris Limassol. He was the second Sierra Leonean player to sign for Aris Limassol after Gibrilla Julius Wobay who joined them on a season loan from Romanian side Universita Craiova.

On 19 February 2016, last day of the Serbian winter transfer window, Bangura signed with FK Borac Čačak, at time a second-placed club at half-season of the 2015–16 Serbian SuperLiga. He thus became the fourth Sierra Leonean to play in the Serbian highest level after Kelfala Marah, Medo and Lamin Suma. On 11 March, in the round 26 of the SuperLiga, Bangura scored his first goal with a header in the 91st minute of the game against Vojvodina. His goal secured Borac a last minutes draw against a direct opponent in the league. Next summer he moved to the Serbian First League club Zemun, but after he made six appearances in both domestic competitions, he was suspended by the club and missed to play any official match for the rest of season. In September 2017, Bangura signed with the Greek side Rodos.

== International career ==
On 14 November 2014, Bangura scored a goal against Côte d'Ivoire.

== Personal life ==
On 24 May 2011, Bangura was involved in a car crash together with his cousin Ibraheem Wahid Sillah. He returned in full action in November 2011 for Apollon Limassol.

== Honours ==
Apollon

- Cypriot Cup: 2009–10 (scored in Cup Final the first goal in the win 2–1 against APOEL)
- Cypriot Cup runner-up: 2010–11 (scored 5 goals in 5 games out 7 in total games including the final)
