= Mohamed Jalloh =

Mohamed Jalloh may refer to:

- Mohamed A. Jalloh, Sierra Leonean politician
- Mohamed Bailor Jalloh (1989–2026), Sierra Leonean-American perpetrator of the 2026 Old Dominion University shooting
- Mohamed Juldeh Jalloh (born 1970), Sierra Leonean politician
- Mohamed Wurie Jalloh (born 1956), Sierra Leonean politician
