= Michael Tommy (footballer) =

Sierra Leonean footballer

Personal information
- Date of birth: June 30, 1979 (age 47)
- Place of birth: Freetown, Sierra Leone
- Height: 6 ft 0 in (1.83 m)
- Position: Goalkeeper

Senior career*
| Years | Team | Apps | (Gls) |
| 2000–2001 | Mighty Blackpool | | |
| 2001–2003 | Mighty Barrolle | | |
| 2004 | Herediano | | |
| 2004–2005 | Belén | | |
| 2005–2006 | Puntarenas | 6 | (0) |
| 2006 | Cartaginés | 3 | (0) |
| 2007 | Liberia Mía | 11 | (0) |
| 2008 | Municipal Puntarenas | | |
| 2010 | Grecia | | |

International career
| 2003 | Sierra Leone | | |
- * Club domestic league appearances and goals

Michael Tommy (born June 30, 1979) is a Sierra Leonean former footballer who played as a goalkeeper.

== Career ==
Tommy was born and raised in Freetown, Sierra Leone's capital city. He started his football career with local club Mighty Blackpool in the Sierra Leone National Premier League before moving to Liberian Premier League giant Mighty Barolle in 2001.
