= Njala =

Njala means several things:

- Njáls saga, a well-known Icelandic saga,
- Njala, Moyamba, a city in Sierra Leone
- Njala, Bo, a city in Sierra Leone
