= Joe Robert Pemagbi =

Sierra Leonean diplomat (born 1945)

Sierra Leone Ambassador to the United Nation
- Incumbent
- Assumed office 4 March 2003

Personal details
- Born: November 22, 1945 (age 80) Bo, British Sierra Leone
- Party: None
- Children: 5
- Education: Njala University: Njala, Moyamba District, Sierra Leone

Joe Robert Pemagbi (born 22 November 1945 in Bo, British Sierra Leone) is a Sierra Leonean diplomat. He has been the Sierra Leonean Ambassador to the United Nations since March 2003. He is also a graduate of Njala University college where he also was a long time staff member: Language department head from 1986 to 1995, Dean from 1988 to 1992, and associate professor from 1991 to 1995). He was also chairperson of the National Commission for Democracy and Human Rights from 1999 to March 2003. He is a member of the Mende ethnic group. During his time as the chairman of the NCDHR, he effortlessly continued lecturing at his Alma Mata. He is still one of Sierra Leone's most renowned linguists. He hols an MPhil in Linguistics from Leeds University.
