= John Ajina Sesay =

Sierra Leonean football coach and manager

Personal information
- Position: Midfielder

Team information
- Current team: Sierra Leone (manager)

Senior career*
Years	Team	Apps	(Gls)
- Old Edwardians

International career
- Sierra Leone

Managerial career
- 2014–2015: Sierra Leone
- * Club domestic league appearances and goals

John Ajina Sesay is a Sierra Leonean football coach who became manager of the national team in October 2014.

He played as a midfielder for Old Edwardians F.C. Sesay was manager of East End Lions and won the league title in 2009. He was also manager at Freetown City F.C.
