= Hassan Sesay =

Hassan Sesay may refer to:

- Hassan Koeman Sesay (1986–), Sierra Leonean international football player
- Hassan Mila Sesay (1987–), Sierra Leonean international football player
