= Ports Authority =

Ports Authority may refer to:

- Gambia Ports Authority F.C., football club based in Gambia
- Nigerian Ports Authority, football club based in Nigeria
- Ports Authority F.C., football club based in Sierra Leone
