= Hassan Koeman Sesay =

Sierra Leonean footballer

Personal information
- Full name: Hassan Koeman Sesay
- Date of birth: 5 September 1981 (age 45)
- Place of birth: Freetown, Sierra Leone
- Height: 1.80 m (5 ft 11 in)
- Position: Central defender

Senior career*
Years	Team	Apps	(Gls)
1998–2002	Goderich United		
2002–2006	F.C. Kallon		
2006–2011	Hà Nội ACB		
2012	Hà Nội ACB II		
2014–2018	Ethio Electric		

International career
2003–2007	Sierra Leone	4	(0)
- * Club domestic league appearances and goals

Hassan Koeman Sesay (born 5 September 1981) is a Sierra Leonean former professional footballer who played as a centre-back. He played for the Sierra Leone national team, for whom he has appeared in a 2010 FIFA World Cup qualifying match. He started his football career with local club Real Republicans in the Sierra Leone National First Division, the highest football league in Sierra Leone. He spent some seasons at the club then moved to Goderich United, then F.C. Kallon, and then Al-Nasr based in Salalah, Oman before he moved to Hà Nội ACB in Vietnam. He spent the last years of his career at Ethio Electric, a club based on Addis Ababa, Ethiopia.
