= Bo, Sierra Leone =

City in Southern Province, Sierra Leone

Bo
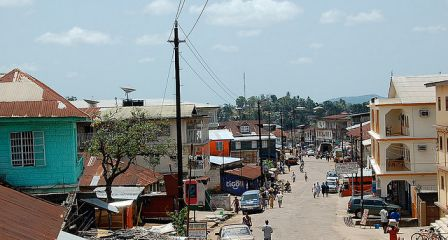

- Location in Sierra Leone
- Coordinates: 7°57′23″N 11°44′24″W
- Country: Sierra Leone
- Province: Southern Province
- District: Bo District

Government
  - Type: City Council
  - Mayor: Kobba Musa
  - Deputy Mayor: Hawa Campbell
  - Governing Body: Bo City Council

Population (2017)
  - Total: 233,684
- Time zone: UTC±00:00 (GMT)

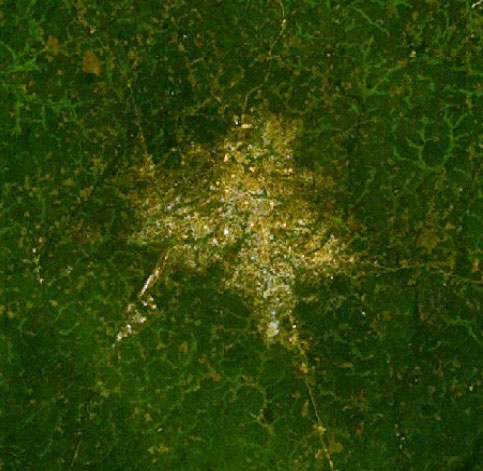
Satellite view of Bo (Landsat image viewed using NASA World Wind software)

Bo, also commonly referred to as Bo Town, is the second largest city in Sierra Leone by population (after Freetown) and the largest city in the Southern Province. It is the capital and administrative centre of Bo District. The city of Bo has a population of 223,075 based on 2021 national mid-term census estimates. It lies approximately 160 miles (250 km) east-southeast of Freetown, and about 40 miles (64 km) from Kenema. Bo is the leading financial, educational and economic centre of southern Sierra Leone..

The city of Bo is one of Sierra Leone's six municipalities and is locally governed by the directly elected Bo City Council, which is headed by a mayor. The Mayor and members of the Bo City Council are directly elected every four years in a municipal election. Kobba Musa, Bo's current mayor, was elected in 2023.

The city is the primary home of Njala University, the second largest university in Sierra Leone, after the Fourah Bay College. Bo is also home to the Bo Government Secondary School, commonly known as Bo School, which is one of the biggest and most prominent secondary schools in West Africa. The school has a history of producing some of Sierra Leone's most gifted students. The city is home to the Bo Stadium, the second largest stadium in Sierra Leone, and is mostly used for football matches.

Bo is one of the most ethnically diverse cities in Sierra Leone. The city is home to a significant population of many of Sierra Leone's ethnic groups, with no single ethnic group forming a majority. Bo is the principal home of the Mende people, who form the plurality of the city's population. As with most parts of Sierra Leone, the Krio language of the Sierra Leone Creole people is by far the most widely spoken language in Bo and is the primary means of communication in the city.

The city's population is religiously diverse, primarily among Muslims and Christians.

== History ==
Bo began its modern development with the coming of the Sierra Leone Government Railway in 1889 and became an educational centre in 1906, when the Bo Government Secondary School was established.

From 1930 until independence in 1961, it was the capital of the Protectorate of Sierra Leone. The city is the administrative centre of the Southern Province. After Freetown, Bo is the leading transportation, commercial, and educational centre of Sierra Leone.

The Sierra Leone Government Railway was closed in 1974.

The inhabitants of Bo are known for their resolve, resistance and hospitality.

=== Etymology ===
According to folklore, the town was named after its generosity. An elephant was killed by a hunter, and people from the surrounding villages came to receive their share. Because the amount of meat was so large, the hunter spent days distributing it. He said "Bi-woo", which in Mende language means "this is yours," (with reference to the meat) was said so much that the area came to be known as "Bi-woo", which became "Bo".

== Government ==
The city of Bo is one of Sierra Leone's six municipalities and is governed by a directly elected city council form of government, headed by a mayor, in whom executive authority is vested. The mayor is responsible for the general management of the city. The mayor and members of the Bo city council are elected directly by the residents of Bo in a municipal election that is held every four years.

Like virtually all parts of the Southern Province, the city of Bo is a reliable political stronghold of the Sierra Leone People's Party. The SLPP has won every Sierra Leone presidential elections in the city and the rest of Bo District by an overwhelming majority. The SLPP has also won virtually every parliamentary, and Local government elections in Bo by an overwhelming majority, including the Sierra Leone general elections held in November 2012. Former mayor Harold Logie Tucker, a SLPP member, was elected mayor with 69.7% of the votes in the 2012 Bo Mayoral election.

With assistance from the Revenue Development Foundation Bo City Council has started to collect property taxes.

== Geography ==
=== Climate ===
Like the rest of Sierra Leone, Bo has a tropical climate, more specifically a tropical monsoon climate (Am) under the Köppen climate classification, with a rainy season from May to November and a dry season from December to April. Average annual precipitation varies with up to 5,080 mm (200 in) in the wettest parts. The prevailing winds are the SW Monsoon during the wet season and the northeastern Harmattan which is a dust-laden wind from the Sahara Desert during the dry season. Average temperature ranges in Bo are from 21 degrees Celsius (73 degrees Fahrenheit) to 31 degrees Celsius (88 degrees Fahrenheit) all year.

Climate data for Bo, Sierra Leone
Month	Jan	Feb	Mar	Apr	May	Jun	Jul	Aug	Sep	Oct	Nov	Dec	Year
Mean daily maximum °C (°F)	32.2 (90.0)	33.8 (92.8)	34.3 (93.7)	33.4 (92.1)	32.0 (89.6)	30.4 (86.7)	28.6 (83.5)	28.4 (83.1)	29.4 (84.9)	30.8 (87.4)	31.2 (88.2)	31.2 (88.2)	31.3 (88.3)
Daily mean °C (°F)	25.4 (77.7)	26.6 (79.9)	27.3 (81.1)	27.3 (81.1)	26.5 (79.7)	25.6 (78.1)	24.7 (76.5)	24.4 (75.9)	24.9 (76.8)	25.5 (77.9)	25.9 (78.6)	25.4 (77.7)	25.8 (78.4)
Mean daily minimum °C (°F)	19.2 (66.6)	20.3 (68.5)	20.5 (68.9)	22.0 (71.6)	22.1 (71.8)	21.9 (71.4)	21.9 (71.4)	21.9 (71.4)	21.7 (71.1)	21.5 (70.7)	21.5 (70.7)	20.3 (68.5)	21.2 (70.2)
Average precipitation mm (inches)	5.8 (0.23)	15.8 (0.62)	41.6 (1.64)	114.2 (4.50)	254.7 (10.03)	328.5 (12.93)	429.3 (16.90)	488.9 (19.25)	428.2 (16.86)	338.4 (13.32)	148.9 (5.86)	22.3 (0.88)	2,616.6 (103.02)
Average precipitation days	1	2	5	9	16	21	25	26	25	24	12	2	168
Average relative humidity (%) (at 15:00 local time)	49	46	47	55	64	72	79	81	76	69	66	59	64
Average dew point °C (°F)	20.4 (68.7)	20.9 (69.6)	21.6 (70.9)	22.6 (72.7)	23.2 (73.8)	23.2 (73.8)	22.8 (73.0)	22.7 (72.9)	22.9 (73.2)	23.0 (73.4)	23.1 (73.6)	21.8 (71.2)	22.3 (72.2)
Mean monthly sunshine hours	198.4	196.0	189.1	183.0	182.9	144.0	99.2	83.7	120.0	179.8	189.0	167.4	1,932.5
Mean daily sunshine hours	6.4	7.0	6.1	6.1	5.9	4.8	3.2	2.7	4.0	5.8	6.3	5.4	5.3
Source: NOAA

== Demographics ==
Bo has an ethnically diverse population, although the Mende make up the largest ethnic group. The city is home to a significant numbers of many of the country's ethnic groups as well as a large Liberian community. The population of the city is about equal in numbers between Muslims and Christians.

Historical population
Year	Pop.	±%
1974	39,371	—
1985	59,768	+51.8%
2004	149,957	+150.9%
2015	174,369	+16.3%

== Culture ==
=== One World Link ===
In 1981 Bo District formed a 'One World Link' (OWL) with Warwick District in the United Kingdom. This was inspired by a desire for justice, equality, human understanding and mutual support. Over the years it has helped to strengthen both communities and their awareness of global and development issues. The many outcomes of the link include women's groups, school links, an online archive, an education programme and the opening, in 2008, of a Community Centre in Bo city. Immediate plans include collaboration on a pilot environmental programme for the collection and disposal of waste. There is also a youth wing which has 20 registered youth groups, that serve over 1,000 young people.

=== BODDA ===
The Bo District Development Association (BODDA - UK) was formed in the United Kingdom on 7 September 2003 by a group of natives from Bo District in Sierra Leone. The primary purpose for the formation of this organization is for its membership to explore every possible lawful avenue to solicit generous donations in cash, food, clothing, educational and agricultural.

Bo District Development Association has been involved in various projects including sponsorships in Sierra Leone and the UK, for example the introduction of the BODDA Civic Award in which the people of Bo are annually awarded for their contributions towards nation building and community development (this is an effort to encourage the people of Bo in national development and citizenship); donation of two hundred computers and other school materials to various schools in Bo in 2007; donation of medical equipment to the Bo Government Hospital and books to the Bo Regional library in January 2010. In August 2006, in partnership with the British Council Sierra Leone, they were able to facilitate a one-month tour for six artists from Bo with the aim of promoting awareness of global issues through music and encouraging global citizenship through the linking of youth groups in the UK and Sierra Leone.

The Organisation also awards scholarship to students from poor family backgrounds who are unable to meet their educational needs.

== Education ==
The city has a campus of Njala University.

As in most parts of Sierra Leone, the Krio language is widely spoken in Bo, although English is the official language spoken at schools and government places. The Mende language is also widely understood by the city's residents, although Krio is by far the most widely spoken language. Bo has one of the highest literacy rates in Sierra Leone.

The city is home to Bo Teacher's College, and hence to many primary schools as well as several secondary schools, including one of the elite secondary schools in West Africa, The Bo Government Secondary School (commonly known as Bo School).

Bo school was founded in 1906 by British educationist Leslie Probyn to educate the children of Bo Town. The school has a long history of producing the elite of Sierra Leone, especially the country's top politicians. It is situated on 5.5 hectares (13.5 acres) of land in the heart of Bo Town. The school itself is situated in pleasant surroundings and within walking distance of the government hospital, government post office, police station, and the main shopping centre of Bo Town. A football field, volleyball court, basketball court, long tennis court, and cricket pitch enrich the recreational facilities the school provides. There are plans to rehabilitate the school swimming pool. Bo School also maintains a unique tradition of seniority which has consistently augured well for social cohesion among the students. Maggots/Greeners/Rustics are either junior or newer members of the school (specifically those with more recent admission numbers). They are expected to always observe all rules of deference association with their positions and comply fully with specific instructions from senior students.

Bo is also home to the Bo Teacher's College, and the newly built Bo Industrial Growth Centre, one of Sierra Leone's largest vocational schools, which was officially opened by Sierra Leone's president Ernest Bai Koroma in April 2013.

=== Notable Secondary Schools ===
- Christ the King College
- Bo Government Secondary School
- Ahmadiyya Muslim Secondary School
- Ark of Hope Modern Academy
- Queen of the Rosary Secondary School
- Comprehensive Secondary School
- St. Andrews Secondary School
- Bo Commercial Secondary school
- SLMB Secondary School
- St. Pauls Junior Secondary School
- Ken Wiebe School
- Njala University Experimental Secondary School
- Tahir Ahmadiyya Junior Secondary School
- Methodist High School

== Media ==
The two main local radio stations in Bo are Kiss FM 104, and Radio New Song 97.5. The local service of the national broadcaster, SLBS, transmits on 96.5 MHz. Commercial station Capital Radio uses 102.3 MHz and BBC World Service also has an FM relay.

== Sport ==
Like the rest of Sierra Leone, football is the most popular sport in the city. Bo has two football clubs in the Sierra Leone National Premier League, Bo Rangers, and Nepean Stars. Both clubs play their home games at the Bo Stadium. Another club from Bo Town called the Kakua Rangers plays in the Sierra Leone National First Division, the second highest football league in Sierra Leone, after the Sierra Leone National Premier League. There are several clubs from Bo Town in the lower divisions of the Sierra Leone league system.

== Transport ==
=== Bo Airport ===
Bo Airport serves the Bo District and the Southern Province. The airport is no longer in regular use.

== Places of worship ==
Places of worship are predominantly Muslim mosques. There are also Christian churches and temples : Roman Catholic Diocese of Bo (Catholic Church), United Methodist Church in Sierra Leone, United Brethren in Christ Church (World Methodist Council), Baptist Convention of Sierra Leone (Baptist World Alliance), Assemblies of God, The Church of Jesus Christ of Latter-day Saints, and Kingdom Halls of Jehovah's Witnesses.

== Notable people ==
- Nabih Berri, speaker of Lebanese parliament
- Sheik-Umarr Mikailu Jah, Surgeon & Politician, Minister of Sierra Leone 1996-2007.
- Matilda Lansana Minah V, Paramount Chief of Pujehun District, lived in Bo during the Sierra Leone Civil War
- Joe Robert Pemagbi, Sierra Leone ambassador to the United Nations
- Kanja Sesay, Financial Secretary of Bo District Students Union and Secretary General of the Fourah Bay College Students Union
- Wusu Sannoh, mayor of Bo
- Sallieu Bundu, Sierra Leonean football player
- Bunturabie Jalloh Sierra Leone's Olympic flag-bearer
