= Harold Logie Tucker =

Sierra Leonean politician (born 1968)

Mayor of Bo
- In office December 21, 2012 – 2023
- Preceded by: Wusu Sannoh
- Succeeded by: Kobba Mussa

Personal details
- Born: 13 December 1968 (age 57) Sierra Leone
- Party: Sierra Leone People's Party (SLPP)
- Education: Fourah Bay College
- Profession: Development consultant

Harold Logie Tucker (born 13 December 1968) is a Sierra Leonean politician and the former mayor of Bo, the second largest city in Sierra Leone. He is a member of the Sierra Leone People's Party (SLPP), the main opposition party in Sierra Leone. He is a development consultant by profession.

Tucker was elected the mayor of the Municipality of Bo, with 69.07%, defeating his closest opponent Sheik Sillah of the All People's Congress (APC) who took 21.37% in the 2012 Sierra Leone Local Council Elections. Tucker was sworn in as Mayor of Bo on December 21, 2012. His inauguration ceremony in Bo was attended by Sierra Leone's President Ernest Bai Koroma, and some senior members of the SLPP and APC parties. Tucker succeeded his fellow SLPP member Wusu Sannoh as mayor of Bo.
