= Bo City Council =

Local government in Southern Province, Sierra Leone

Bo City Council (BCC)

Type
- Type: City Council

History
- New session started: December 2012

Leadership
- Mayor of Bo: Kobba Musa
- Deputy Mayor of Bo: Hawa Campbell
- Chief Administrator of the Bo City Council: Henry Powell

Structure
- Length of term: 4 years
- Authority: Local Government Act, 2004

Elections
- Last election: November 17, 2012
- Next election: 2016

Meeting place
- Bo City Council Hall; Bo, Sierra Leone

Bo City Council is the municipal government of the city of Bo, Sierra Leone's second largest city. The Council is responsible for the general management of the city. The Bo City Council was reestablished in 2004 by the Sierra Leone Parliament under the Sierra Leone Local Government Act The Bo City Council meet at the Bo City Council Hall on Coronation Field Road in Bo, Sierra Leone.

== System ==
Members of the Bo City Council are directly elected every four years by the residents of Bo and they represent different wards throughout the city. Members of the Bo city Council are known as councillors, except the deputy mayor and the Mayor, in whom local executive power is granted within the city of Bo. Former mayor Harold Logie Tucker of the Sierra Leone People's Party was elected with over 69.07% of the vote in the November 2012 Local Council elections.

All officials appointed by the mayor must be approved by the Bo City Council before taking office. Like the rest of the Southern Part of Sierra Leone, Bo city politics is dominated by the Sierra Leone People's Party (SLPP).

Bo City Council powers include, but not limited to:

- Collect local tax
- Responsible for the cleaning the city and trash collection
- Control streets and petty trading
- Issue of business lincense to shop owners and petty traders
- Monitore Motorcycle and bike riders
- Maintain discipline in schools
