= Abu Tommy =

Sierra Leonean footballer

Personal information
- Date of birth: 13 October 1989 (age 37)
- Place of birth: Sierra Leone
- Positions: Defender; midfielder

Senior career*
Years	Team	Apps	(Gls)
-2010/11	Mighty Blackpool F.C.		
2010/11-2012	FC Sheriff Tiraspol	25	(2)
2012/2013	FC Tiraspol	0	(0)
2013	San Jose Earthquakes	0	(0)
- Atlanta Silverbacks FC
- * Club domestic league appearances and goals

Abu Tommy (Russian: Абу Томми; born 13 October 1989 in Sierra Leone) is a Sierra Leonean retired footballer.

== Career ==
Midway through 2010/11, Tommy signed for Sheriff Tiraspol, the most successful team in Moldova, saying that "Moldova has many opportunities, many games, and there are practically no gaps between them".

In 2012, he joined Tiraspol, another Moldovan club, but failed to make an appearance. After that, Tommy joined San Jose Earthquakes in the American top flight but again failed to make an appearance before playing for lower league side Atlanta Silverbacks.

During his professional career, he rubbed oil on himself before games in the belief that God would protect him.
