= Victoria Conteh =

Sierra Leonean footballer

Victoria Conteh is a Sierra Leonean football manager.

== Playing career ==
Conteh played in the Sierra Leone women's national football team's first game in 1994.

== Managerial career ==
In December 2019, Conteh was announced as the new manager of East End Lions, becoming the second woman to manage a top-flight football club in Africa. Her first game as manager of the East End Lions was a 1–1 draw with FC Kallon. She helped the club achieve second place before the league was stopped due to the coronavirus pandemic. She also worked as a CAF coaching instructor.

== Personal life ==
Conteh holds a CAF A License.
