= Alie Badara Mansaray =

Sierra Leonean politician

Commissioner of the Sierra Leone National Commission for Social Action (NaCSA)
- In office December 2014 – 2018
- President: Ernest Bai Koroma

Personal details
- Education: Njala University; University of East Anglia

Alie Badara Mansaray was Commissioner of the Sierra Leone National Commission for Social Action (NaCSA) from December 2014 until 2018.

He graduated from Njala University with a bachelor's degree in Agricultural Education in 1983 and an MA in Development Studies from the University of East Anglia in 2005.
