= Mohamed Wurie Jalloh =

Sierra Leonean politician (born 1956)

Deputy Mayor of Bo
- In office 2012–present

Personal details
- Born: October 3, 1956 (age 69) Bo, British Sierra Leone
- Party: Sierra Leone People's Party

Mohamed Wurie Jalloh (born October 3, 1956) is a Sierra Leonean politician who is currently serving as the deputy mayor of Bo, the second largest city in Sierra Leone. He is an elected councilor in the Bo City Council and a member of the Sierra Leone People's Party.
