= Bo Stadium =

Sports venue in Bo, Sierra Leone

- Interactive map of Bo Stadium
- Full name: Bo Stadium
- Location: Bo, Sierra Leone
- Coordinates: 7°56′54.4″N 11°41′42.5″W
- Owner: Sierra Leone government
- Operator: Sierra Leone Ministry of Sports
- Capacity: 4,000
- Surface: Grass

Construction
- Built: 2014
- Opened: 2014

Tenants
- Occasional home of the Sierra Leone national under 20 and under 17 team football teams; Bo Rangers, Nepean Stars,

The Bo Stadium is a stadium located in Bo, Sierra Leone. The stadium has an all-seated capacity of 4,000, making it the second-largest stadium in Sierra Leone after the Siaka Stevens National Stadium in Freetown. The stadium was planned and constructed by Chinese contractors. It is mostly use for association football games and is the home stadium of Bo Rangers and Nepean Stars. It is also used as the occasional home of the Sierra Leone national under-20 and under-17 teams.
