= Kabba Samura =

Sierra Leonean footballer

Personal information
- Full name: Kabba Samura
- Date of birth: 26 October 1981 (age 45)
- Place of birth: Freetown, Sierra Leone
- Height: 1.77 m (5 ft 10 in)
- Positions: Striker; winger

Team information
- Current team: Hoàng Anh Gia Lai

Youth career
- Old Edwardians F.C.

Senior career*
Years	Team	Apps	(Gls)
1997	Mighty Blackpool	20	(12)
1997–1999	IFK Ölme	33	(34)
1999–2001	IFK Göteborg B	41	(56)
2001–2003	IFK Göteborg	23	(7)
2004–2005	Assyriska FF	69	(27)
2005–2006	OFI	6	(4)
2006	Aalesunds FK	9	(3)
2007	HJK	18	(3)
2008	Bodens BK	19	(2)
2009–2010	Muğan Salyan	14	(9)
2011	Hoàng Anh Gia Lai		

International career
2001	Sierra Leone	5	(1)
- * Club domestic league appearances and goals

Kabba Samura (born 26 October 1981 in Freetown, Sierra Leone) is a Sierra Leonean international soccer player and as well a Swedish Citizen European passport holder.

== Playing career ==
=== Early career ===
Samura began his career with Mighty Blackpool in the Sierra Leonean Premier League. He made his debut at his club where he started his career at the age of 14 years. Was taunted as the best whizkid during his youth age in Sierra Leone, later moved to Europe at a young age to play for IFK Ölme during this same year while playing for IFK Ölme was also under the raiding light of IFK Göteborg.

=== IFK Göteborg ===
Later sign him up to play for IFK Göteborg B team and develop his talent after playing two season for IFK Ölme. While playing for IFK Göteborg B team his ability to hold the ball and run with him caused so many damage in IFK Göteborg B team and was promoted to the IFK Göteborg first team. On his senior debut for IFK Göteborg he scored against AIK – his first and only goal for the club.

=== Assyriska FF ===
After seeing limited playing time in Göteborg. he moved to Assyriska FF in Superettan on a loan in 2003. He scored two goals in the Swedish Cup against his former teammates in IFK Göteborg as Assyriska advanced to the semi-finals. The club also qualified to the finals after a 4–0 win against Djurgårdens IF, but lost against IF Elfsborg. The club made the move permanent after his impressive performances. The next season would prove to be even more successful as he led the team in scoring with 14 league goals, helping the team to a third-place finish. The club lost the qualification bout against Örgryte IS, but would later earn promotion as Örebro SK were relegated due to financial reasons.

Samura also led the team in scoring during the 2005 season with three goals in 22 appearances, but could not help the team avoid relegation as the club finished last. Samura left the team after the season as his contract expired.

=== OFI Crete and loan to Aalesund ===
After several trials at different clubs, Samura finally signed for OFI in the Greek Super League.

Later that year he moved to Aalesunds FK in Norwegian Adeccoligaen 2006 on a short-term loan where he helped the team earn a promotion to the Norwegian Premier League, scoring three goals in nine appearances.

=== HJK Helsinki ===
He played for HJK Helsinki in Finnish football premier in 2007 where he enjoyed a lot of playing time, but unfortunately has a hard time finding the net. The season ended with three goals in 18 appearances as HJK finished in a disappointing seventh place, far away from a title race.

=== Return to Sweden ===
At the start of the 2008 season Samura signed a 3-year contract with Bodens BK in the Swedish Northern Division 1 (third tier) where he joined personal friends Charles Sampson and Aluspah Brewah. Samura's debut could have been better as he was sent off in the 54th minute after hitting an opponent in the face and Boden subsequently lost the game against Gröndals IK 0–1. The rest of the season would not prove to be any better as the team was relegated. Samura featured in the starting line-up in the season. Milosevic left the club during the season, but Samura was unable to lift under new coaches Lars "Brolla" Svensson and Jonas Larsson. He ended the season with only two goals scored and declared that he intended to leave the newly relegated club just as Sampson and Brewah already had done.

=== Later career ===
Samura moved to Azerbaijani club FK Mughan in January 2010. In May 2011, he signed a short-term contract with Vietnam's V-League club Hoàng Anh Gia Lai.

== Personal life ==
Samura has a wife and two children.
