= Bo Teacher's College =

Sierra Leone college

- Type: Public
- Established: 1978
- Students: 534
- Location: Bo, Sierra Leone
- Campus: Bo campus
- Affiliations: University of Sierra Leone

Bo Teacher's College is a three year college located in Bo, the second largest city of Sierra Leone. The college trains prospective teachers for primary and junior secondary school levels (form 1-3). after successfully completing the programme, candidates qualify for the Teachers Certificate (TC) and the Higher Teachers Certificate (HTC). The college offers programmes in several majors, including English studies, social studies, environmental science, agriculture and Mathematics education.

== Current programmes ==
- School of Community Health Services
- School of Social Sciences
- School of Agriculture
- School of Environmental Sciences
- School of Technology
- school of business management
- school of social studies
