= Ibrahim Bundu =

Sierra Leonean politician

Ibrahim Rassin Bundu

Majority Leader of the Sierra Leone Parliament
- Incumbent
- Assumed office January 21, 2014
- Preceded by: Sheku Badara Bashiru Dumbuya

Deputy Majority Leader of Sierra Leone Parliament
- In office 2007–2014

Member of Sierra Leone Parliament from Port Loko District
- In office 2002–present

Personal details
- Born: Gbinti, Dibia chiefdom, Karene District, Sierra Leone
- Party: All People's Congress (APC)
- Education: Fourah Bay College

Ibrahim Rassin Bundu is a Sierra Leonean politician and the current majority leader of the Sierra Leone Parliament. Bundu was previously the minority whip and deputy majority leader of parliament. He is a prominent and senior member of the All People's Congress (APC) party.

Ibrahim Bundu is the younger brother of Sierra Leonean economist and one of the country's most famous politicians Abass Bundu, who is a member of the opposition Sierra Leone People's Party.

Ibrahim Bundu was first elected to parliament during 2002 Parliamentary elections, and has been re-elected twice in 2007 and 2012 by a large margins. Bundu represents Constituency fifty one that comprises Dibia chiefdom, in Port Loko District in the Sierra Leone House of Parliament.

Bundu is a native of Gbinti, Karene District in Northern Sierra Leone; and a member of the Fula ethnic group. He is a close ally of Sierra Leone's president Ernest Bai Koroma.
