= The Evangelical College of Theology =

The Evangelical College of Theology (TECT) is a Christian educational establishment in Sierra Leone. The college offers certificate, diplomas, bachelor degree and Master degree programs. Enrolment for the 2017-18school year was 800 students. The college operates at four locations: the main campus in Jui, the Freetown Extension site, and the Makeni and Bo Distance Education sites.

TECT is partnered with the Global Connection Partnership Network, Overseas Council International, and the European Baptist Mission. These organizations provide short term and long term supportive staff to the college. For the 2012-13 school year, the campus has 37 Sierra Leonean staff and faculty members, with 4 American staff and faculty members in lecturer or administrative support roles.

== History ==
In 1957, an Inter-Missions Bible School Committee was formed by four Christian denominations in Sierra Leone: The Missionary Church of Africa (MCA), United Brethren in Christ (UBC), and the American Wesleyan Methodist Church (AWM) now called the Wesleyan Church of Sierra Leone. This committee formed from the identified need for training pastors and administrators for the Christian churches of Sierra Leone.

During the transition from colonial rule which was finalized in 1961, the committee requested from British government to obtain land for a campus. The British government granted the land and buildings of a former military barracks located on the Jui Peninsula 10 miles east of Freetown, Sierra Leone’s capital city.

On October 12, 1964, the Sierra Leone Bible College was founded and begun offering both diploma and bachelor’s level degrees.

The campus was initially led and run by western missionaries, predominantly from the United States. The missionaries, and their sending denominations, provided funding for all the operations of the campus.

During this time, the enrolment year to year varied between ten and thirty students.

In 1979, the Baptist Convention of Sierra Leone was added as a proprietary body.

In 1998, the Countess of Huntington Connexion was added as a proprietary body and the Missionary Church of Africa (MCA) withdrew its proprietorship.

In 1999, the campus officially changed its name to The Evangelical College of Theology (TECT).

== During the Civil War ==
When the civil war escalated in the 1990s, the western missionary leadership of the college gathered several alumni who were then in positions of church leadership in Sierra Leone. The missionaries informed the Sierra Leoneans that they were withdrawing both their personnel and financial support of the campus and handed full leadership to the Sierra Leoneans.

This presented a challenge to the new national leadership. Enrolment and tuition of ten to thirty students each year did not financially provide for the needs and upkeep of the campus. As a result, additional programs were initiated and the enrolment was grown from thirty to over 200 students each semester at the main campus in Jui outside of Freetown.

== Current programs ==
TECT now offers diplomas and degrees in the following areas:

=== Degrees ===
- Masters in Theology
- Masters in Global Leadership
- Bachelor of Theology (with majors in Missions, Pastoral Studies and Christian Education)
- Bachelor of Adult Education
- Bachelor in Peace & Development Studies
- Bachelor in Community Development Studies
- Bachelor in Business Administration (With Majors in Banking and Finance, and Marketing)

=== Diplomas ===
- Theology
- Christian Ministry
- Community Development Studies
- Peace & Conflict Studies
- Public Administration
- Business Administration
