= Goderich United =

- Full name: Goderich United
- Ground: Goderich Football Field; Goderich, Sierra Leone
- League: Sierra Leone National First Division
Home colours

Goderich United is a Sierra Leonean football club based in Goderich, a suburb of Freetown, Sierra Leone. The Goderich United is currently playing in the Sierra Leone National First Division, the second highest football league.
