= Bai Bureh Warriors =

Association football club in Sierra Leone

- Full name: Bai Bureh Warriors
- Nickname: The Warriors
- Ground: Port Loko Football Field; Port Loko, Sierra Leone
- Owner: Community Team
- Chairman: Santigie Ibrahim Kamara
- League: Sierra Leone National First Division
- 2025–2026: 3rd
Home colours

The Bai Bureh Warriors of Port Loko commonly known as Bai Bureh Warriors is a Sierra Leonean professional football (soccer) club founded in 1954, currently headed by Santigie Ibrahim Kamara as chairman, Honorable Mariatu Rachael Pessima Nee Sesay as club president and Alhaji Salifu Kargbo as club secretary and Issa Ali Tarawallie head of admin, the club is currently based in Port Loko City, Port Loko District, Sierra Leone.

The club is currently playing in the Sierra Leone National First Division, the second highest football league in Sierra Leone.. Bai Bureh Warriors spent many years in the Sierra Leone National Premier League before being relegated to the second division in 2005.

The club is named after Bai Bureh, a great Sierra Leonean warrior and military strategist who led the Temne Uprising against the British in 1898.

Bai Bureh Warriors won the Sierra Leonean FA Cup Cup in 1978 and 1982 and their best performance in any Caf competitions came in 1979 when they reached the second round of the CAF Cup Winners' Cup.

== Achievements ==
- Sierra Leonean FA Cup: 2

1978, 1982

== Performance in CAF competitions ==
- CAF Cup Winners' Cup: 2 appearances

1979 – Second Round
1983 – First Round
