= Wusum Stars =

- Full name: The Wusum Stars FC of Bombali
- Nicknames: The Wusum Boys, The Northern Rock
- Ground: Wusum Stadium; Makeni, Sierra Leone
- Capacity: 10,000
- Chairman: (Sierra Leone) Alhassan Kanu
- Manager: “Abdul “German” Bangura
- League: Sierra Leone National Premier League
- 2025–2026: 14th

The Wusum Stars of Bombali commonly referred to as simply Wusum Stars, is a Sierra Leonean professional football club based in Makeni, Sierra Leone. They are member of Sierra Leone National Premier League, the top football league in Sierra Leone. The club represent the Bombali District. Their home matches are played at Wusum Stadium in Makeni. Wusum Stars won the Sierra Leone FA Cup in 1979.

== Achievements ==
- Sierra Leonean FA Cup: 1

1979

== Performance in CAF competitions ==
- CAF Cup Winners' Cup: 1 appearance

1980 – First Round
