= Njala University =

Public university in Sierra Leone

- Type: Public
- Established: 1964
- Chancellor: Sahr Gevao
- Vice-Chancellor: Bashiru Koroma
- Students: 25,045 total
- Location: Bo, Sierra Leone: Njala, Moyamba District, Sierra Leone
- Campus: Njala and Bo campus (urban)
- Website: http://njala.edu.sl/

Njala University (NU) is a public university located in Njala and Bo, Sierra Leone. It is the second largest university in Sierra Leone (after the University of Sierra Leone). The largest and main campus of Njala University is in Njala, Moyamba District; the other campus is Bo, the second largest city in Sierra Leone.

== History ==
NU was originally created as part of the University of Sierra Leone (USL) in 1964 with the help of USAID and offered degrees in conjunction with the University of Illinois. Subsequent legislation in 1972 paired Fourah Bay and Njala under the University of Sierra Leone act, where the presidents of each institution switched the presidency of the USL on a biennial basis. This continued until 2005, when the university act separated Fourah Bay and NU into distinct institutions independently run.

== Statistics ==
In the 1999–2000 academic year, NU had 722 male students and 98 female, which equated to approximately 27% of Sierra Leonean college students. It had 436 male staff and 98 females.

== Current schools ==
The university commenced in August 2005 with the founding of 6 schools:

- School of Education
- School of Community Health Services
- School of Social Sciences
- School of Agriculture
- School of Environmental Sciences
- School of Technology

== Bo campus ==
Bo campus has three schools, Education, Community Health Services and Social Sciences.

== Njala campus ==
Njala campus has the other three schools, including Agriculture, Environmental Sciences and Technology as well as the university secretariat. However, as of the 2005-2006 year, New England Ville in Freetown was temporarily home to all of Njala's facilities, pending the rebuilding of Njala's campus.

== Notable people ==
- Monty Jones, executive director of FARA "and Co-winner of the prestigious 2004 World Food Prize, awarded for his discovery of the genetic process to create the New Rice for Africa (NERICA)
- Alie Badara Mansaray, commissioner of the Sierra Leone National Commission for Social Action
- S T Matturi, former principal of Njala University College and Sierra Leone's high commissioner to the UK during which time he played a crucial part in the twinning of Hull City and Freetown
- Paul Richards, retired from Wageningen University, teaches and researches at Njala since 2014.
- Joe Robert Pemagbi, current ambassador from Sierra Leone to the United Nations and former dean and head of language department.
- Julius Spencer, Sierra Leonean movie actor and director, poet and playwright, journalist, and former Minister of Information and Broadcasting in the war-years and co-founder of the Campaign for Good Governance
- Kandeh Yumkella, director-general of UNIDO
