= Rashin Wurie =

Sierra Leonean footballer

Personal information
- Full name: Rashin Wurie
- Date of birth: 27 December 1972 (age 53)
- Place of birth: Freetown, Sierra Leone
- Height: 1.64 m (5 ft 5 in)
- Position: Midfielder

Youth career
- Freetown United

Senior career*
Years	Team	Apps	(Gls)
1990–1993	Boom	51	(5)
1993–1997	Beerschot	75	(9)
1997–1999	Mons	22	(0)
1999	Pâturages	12	(2)
2000	Lok Altmark Stendal	12	(0)
2000–2001	Eintracht Braunschweig	2	(0)

International career
1994–2002	Sierra Leone		
- * Club domestic league appearances and goals

Rashin Wurie (born 27 December 1972 in Freetown, Sierra Leone) is a former Sierra Leonean international footballer.

== Career ==
Wurie spent most of his professional career in Belgium, where he played for K. Boom F.C. in the Belgian First Division and Belgian Second Division from 1990 until 1993, as well as K. Beerschot V.A.C. in the Second Division for the 1993–94 through 1996–97 seasons. He also had brief spells with Lok Altmark Stendal and Eintracht Braunschweig in the German Regionalliga.

== International career ==
He was included in the Sierra Leone national team for the 1996 African Nations Cup in South Africa and also took part in Sierra Leone's 1998 FIFA World Cup qualification campaign. During his playing days for the Leone Stars (as Sierra Leone national football team is known), he was one of the most entertaining footballers in the national as well as one of the most popular players among the Sierra Leonean fans.
