= United Methodist Church in Sierra Leone =

The Wesleyan Methodist Church Mission started in 1792 after a request of converted settlers from Nova Scotia. The work was under the care of the British Methodists. The first Wesleyan missionary was Dr. George Warren who arrived in Sierra Leone in 1811. It became autonomous from British Methodism in 1967. Work began in Freetown and spread to the interior of the country. It has 50,000 members, 244 congregations and 14 schools. The United Methodist Church in Sierra Leone is larger than the MCSL.

Both are members of the World Methodist Council.

Whereas the MCSL's origins were in Freetown, spreading to the interior, the UMC's work began in the interior, spreading into Freetown. Though recognisably from the same Methodist stable, the UMC in Freetown has a different feel to the MCSL.
