= Mohamed A. Jalloh =

Sierra Leonean politician

Mohamed A. Jalloh is a Sierra Leonean politician. He is a member of the All People's Congress party and is one of the representatives in the Parliament of Sierra Leone for Koinadugu District, elected in 2002.
