= Regent Olympic F.C. =

- Full name: Regent Olympic Football Club
- Founded: 1924
- Manager: Ayo Macauley
- League: Sierra Leone National First Division

Regent Olympic is a Sierra Leonean football club from Regent Road, a neighborhood in central Freetown, Sierra Leone. They were founded as Sierra Leone Grammar School in 1924. The club is currently playing in the Sierra Leone National First Division, the second highest football league in Sierra Leone. Led by former team manager Ali Wahbi In 1992 regent Olympic qualified for the first time in their history for the Wafu cup and earned 3rd position in the Sierra Leone premier league.

As of 2014 Meleh Bangura was serving as the manager of the team.
