= Murray Town Rovers =

Sierra Leonean football club

Murray Town Rovers is a Sierra Leonean football club from Murray Town, a neighborhood of Freetown, Sierra Leone. The club is currently playing in the Sierra Leone National First Division, the second highest football league in Sierra Leone.
