= Waterloo Strikers =

Football club

- Full name: Waterloo Strikers
- Nickname: The Strikers
- Ground: Waterloo Correctional Ground; Waterloo, Sierra Leone
- League: Sierra Leone National First Division
Home colours

Waterloo Strikers is a Sierra Leonean football club based in Waterloo, a suburb of Freetown, Sierra Leone. The club currently plays in the Sierra Leone National First Division, the second top football league in Sierra Leone.
