= Maseru Brothers FC =

Maseru United
- Full name: Maseru United FC
- Ground: Lesotho High School Grounds, Maseru, Lesotho
- Capacity: 1,000
- League: Lesotho First Division

Maseru United is a Lesotho football club based in Maseru. It is based in the city of Maseru in the Maseru District.

The team currently plays in the Lesotho Second Division.

In 1970 the team won the Lesotho Premier League.

== Stadium ==
Currently the team plays at the 1000 capacity Ratjomose Stadium.

== Honours ==
- Lesotho Premier League: 1970, 1976, 1981

== Performance in CAF competitions ==
- 1971 African Cup of Champions Clubs: 2 appearances
- 1977 African Cup of Champions Clubs
