= Amadu Wurie =

Sierra Leonean educationist and politician

Alhaji Amadu Wurie

Member of the Sierra Leone House of Parliament from Port Loko District
- In office 1961–1967

Personal details
- Born: 27 August 1898 Gbinti, British Sierra Leone
- Died: 13 June 1977 (aged 78–79)
- Party: Sierra Leone People's Party (SLPP)
- Profession: Educationist

Amadu Wurie (27 August 1898 – 13 June 1977) was an early Sierra Leonean educationist and politician.

== Biography ==
Wurie was born in Gbinti, Karene District, in the North West Province of British Sierra Leone, the son of a Fula paramount chief. He was educated at the Bo School in Bo, one of the first set of pupils (Admission Number 55) when the school opened in 1906.

In 1916, he was in the first class of Sierra Leoneans that passed the British civil service exam and was appointed the assistant headmaster of the Bo School that year. By 1935, Wurie rose to the position of Senior assistant headmaster which allowed him to be the first African to serve even temporarily as the Headmaster. From 1935 to 1955, Wurie served in various locations across the colony, primarily as headmaster and inspector of schools.

Upon national independence in 1961, Wurie was elected as an MP under the banner of the Sierra Leone People's Party (SLPP), a party he helped found. He was first appointed Minister of Education and later Minister of Interior, a position he kept until he lost his seat in 1967. He then retired to Mahera in the Port Loko District and later made a Hajj to Mecca. In 1973, Wurie was honoured with an honorary doctorate degree from University of Sierra Leone. Wurie died in June 1977 at the age of 79.
