= Nepean Stars F.C. =

Nepean Stars FC
- Full name: Nepean Stars Football Club
- Ground: Bo Stadium; Bo, Sierra Leone
- Capacity: 25,000
- Manager: Alhaji Alusine Kamara
- League: Sierra Leone National Premier League
- 2011: 13 out of 14 clubs

The Nepean Stars of Bo is a Sierra Leonean football club based in Bo, Sierra Leone. They are currently a member of the Sierra Leone National Premier League, the highest division of football league in Sierra Leone. Nepean Stars have an intense rivalry with city rivals Bo Rangers.
