= Kakua Rangers F.C. =

Kakua Rangers Football Club
- Nickname: The Rangers
- Ground: Bo Correctional Ground; Bo, Sierra Leone
- Capacity: 25,000
- League: Sierra Leone National Premier League
Home colours

The Kakua Rangers of Bo is a Sierra Leonean football club based in Bo, the second largest city of Sierra Leone. The club currently plays in the Sierra Leone National Premier League, the highest football league in Sierra Leone. They are currently one of the favorites to win the ongoing league. The Kakua Rangers have an intense rivalry with city rival Nepean Stars. They have been the most dominant club in Bo.
