= Sierra Leone Football Association =

Governing body of football in Sierra Leone

CAF
- Founded: 1923
- FIFA affiliation: 1960
- CAF affiliation: 1967
- President: Babadie Kamara
- Website: slfa.sl

The Sierra Leone Football Association is the governing body of football in Sierra Leone. It was founded in 1960 (current association), and affiliated to FIFA the same year. It organises and runs the national leagues, including the Sierra Leone National Premier League, Sierra Leonean FA Cup, and the national football teams, including the under-17, under-20, under-23, and the senior national team. The Sierra Leone Football Association is formed of elected executive committee members, led by a president, who is currently Babadie Kamara, who was elected in August 2025.

== Executive committee members ==
- Babadie Kamara, president
- Alie Badara Tarawallie, vice president 1
- Prince Kai Saquee, vice president 2
- Mohamed Sorie Jalloh, executive member
- Kweku Melvin Lisk, ex-officio member
- Ramatulai Kamara, ex-officio member
