= Freetonians SLIFA Football Club =

Freetonians SLIFA FC
- Full name: Freetonians SLIFA Football Club
- Nickname: The Strikers
- Ground: Kingtom KT Field; Freetown, Sierra Leone
- Chairman: Benjimina O. Gordon, Mohamed Yaya Barrie
- League: Sierra Leone National Premier League
- 2025–2026: 12th

Freetonians SLIFA Football Club, until 2022 Mount Aureol SLIFA Football Club is a Sierra Leonean football club from Freetown, Sierra Leone. The club is currently a member of the Sierra Leone National Premier League, the highest division of football in Sierra Leone. Freetonians SLIFA FC, is in The first position on the current Division One League 2020 that is on hold due to the COVID-19 pandemic.
