= Yambatui Stars =

Football club

Yambatue Stars
- Nickname: The Scorpions
- Ground: Moyamba Football Ground; Moyamba, Sierra Leone
- League: Sierra Leone National First Division
Home colours

The Yambatui Stars of Moyamba is a Sierra Leonean football club based in Moyamba, Moyamba District, Sierra Leone. The club represents the Moyamba District and is currently playing in the Sierra Leone National First Division, the second highest football league in Sierra Leone. Yambatui Stars is the biggest and most popular football club from Moyamba and gets almost all of its support from the Moyamba District, where it is based.
