= Wellington People F.C. =

Wellington People F.C
- Full name: Wellington People Football Club
- Nickname: The People
- Ground: Approved School Field, Freetown, Sierra Leone
- Team Manager: M.O. Bangura
- Coach: Mustapha 'Pasaffa' Sama, Former Sierra Leone International and Leone Stars Legend
- League: Sierra Leone National First Division
- 2005/06: 1st

Wellington People Football Club, is a Sierra Leonean football club based in Wellington, a neighborhood in the East End of Freetown, Sierra Leone. The club is currently playing in the Sierra Leone National First Division, the second highest football league. The club was playing in the Sierra Leone National Premier League during the 2005–2006 season but was relegated to the second division at the end of that season.

The club was owned by journalist and cabinet minister Paul Kamara.

In 2024, facing financial difficulties, the club was purchased from Paul Kamara. by E.A. Raddar, a Wellingtonian and a long time fan, who has since revived the clubs hopes and inspire them to compete again at a top level. With the new investment from the new owner brought in, there's been renewed enthusiasm from fans and supporters not only within the community but also in the East End of Freetown.

Wellington People Football Club, is a Sierra Leonean football club based in Wellington, a neighborhood in the East End of Freetown, Sierra Leone. The club is currently playing in the Sierra Leone National First Division, the second highest football league. The club was playing in the Sierra Leone National Premier League during the 2005/2006 season but was relegated to the second division at the end of that season.

== Sources ==
- Sierra Leone
