= Ports Authority F.C. =

Ports Authority FC
- Full name: Ports Authority Football Club
- Nickname: The Water Front Boys
- Ground: National Stadium; Freetown, Sierra Leone
- Capacity: 45,000
- Owner: Sierra Leone Port Authority (SLPA)
- Chairman: Musa Sesay
- Manager: Christian Cole
- League: Sierra Leone National Premier League
- 2025–2026: 6th
Home colours

Ports Authority Football Club is a Sierra Leonean professional football club based in the capital Freetown. The club is a member of the Sierra Leone National Premier League, which is the top football division in Sierra Leone. The club is owned and run by the Sierra Leone Ports and Harbours Authority (SLPHA). Ports Authority play their home games at the National Stadium in Freetown.

== Overview ==
One of the biggest and most popular football clubs in Sierra Leone, they won the Sierra Leone National Premier League championship in 1973 and again in 2008. They have won the Sierra Leonean FA Cup competition on two consecutive times in 1990 and 1991. Ports Authority have an intense rivalry with East End Lions as both clubs come from the east end of Freetown. In 1996, Ports Authority became the first and only Sierra Leonean football club to reach the quarter-final of CAF Confederation Cup.

Ports Authority Football team executives fired three from their technical team on 07/05/2010 after an executive meeting. The three fired were the technical director of the team, Akie Noah, head coach Abu Bakarr Kamara and one of his assistants, Mohamed Kamara (Ahmed Central). According to the chairman of the media team of the club, Musa Sesay, he said the three were asked to quit the club with immediate effect.

For the moment, the team will be coached by Hassan Milla, a former player of the team and supervised by Harold Nat Johnson.

== Achievements ==
- Sierra Leone League: 3

1973, 2008, 2011.

- Sierra Leonean FA Cup: 4

1990, 1991, 2004, 2011.

== Performance in CAF competitions ==
- CAF Champions League: 3 appearances

2000 – Preliminary Round
2009 – Preliminary Round
2012 –

- African Cup of Champions Clubs: 1 appearance

1974 – First Round

- CAF Confederation Cup: 2 appearances

2007 – First Round
2011 – Preliminary Round

- CAF Cup: 1 appearance

1996 – Quarter-Finals

- CAF Cup Winners' Cup: 2 appearances

1991 – disqualified in First Round
1992 – First Round

== Notable players ==
- (Nigeria) Patrick Ogunsoto
- (Sierra Leone) Ibrahim "Inspector" Bah
- (Sierra Leone) Kewullay Conteh
- (Sierra Leone) Obi Metzger
- (Sierra Leone) Osman Bah
