= Kanja Sesay =

Alhaji Kanja Ibrahim Sesay

Commissioner of the Sierra Leone National Commission for Social Action (NaCSA).
- In office 2002–2007
- President: Ahmad Tejan Kabbah

Commissioner of the National Commission for Reconstruction, Resettlement and Rehabilitation (NCRRR)
- In office 1999–2002

Deputy Minister of National Ministry for Reconstruction, Resettlement and Rehabilitation (NCRRR)
- In office 1996–1999

Executive Director of the Association for Rural Development (ARD)
- In office 1990–1996

Personal details
- Born: 1955 (age 70–71) Bo, Sierra Leone
- Party: Sierra Leone People's Party
- Spouse: Fatu Kanja Sesay
- Children: Mohamed, Aisha, Ibrahim
- Education: Fourah Bay College, International Institute of Social Studies
- Profession: Economist

Alhaji Ibrahim Kanja Sesay (born in 1955 in Bo, Sierra Leone) is a politician in Sierra Leone. He served with the previous government of Sierra Leone headed by President Ahmed Tejan Kabbah (1996-2007) in various roles.

== Previous work ==
In 1990, Kanja Sesay founded and served as the executive director of the Association for Rural Development (ARD). ARD is currently a leading microcredit finance institution in Sierra Leone and Kanja Sesay, following his departure from formal government service, serves as the chairman of its board of directors.

He has previously served as the chairman of the executive committee of the Sierra Leone Association of Non-Governmental Organisations (SLANGO) and a member of the board of directors of Sierra Leone Export and Investment Corporation (SLEDIC)

After graduating from university, he taught for several years at the Ahmadiyya Muslim Secondary School and Prince of Wales Secondary School in Freetown before launching a career in the field of development as a projects officer at Catholic Relief Services.

== Education ==
Kanja Sesay holds a B.A. (Hons.) Degree from Fourah Bay College, University of Sierra Leone (1980) and an M.A. in Development Studies from the International Institute of Social Studies in The Hague, The Netherlands (1987). He also holds a certificate in Executive Management and Strategic Leadership from Templeton College, University of Oxford (2002); and a Certificate in Counter-Disaster Planning and Management jointly from the Mananga Agricultural Management Centre in Swaziland and the Disaster Preparedness Centre, Royal Military College of Science in Cranfield, England (1988).

As a student, he served as the financial secretary of the Bo District Students Union at Bo School and secretary general of the Fourah Bay College Students Union.

== Personal life ==
Kanja Sesay is married with three children. His wife, Fatu Kanja Sesay (née Daramy), is the former Commissioner for Democracy with the National Commission for Democracy and Human Rights.

He is a member of the Mandingo ethnic group.
