= Baptist Convention of Sierra Leone =

- Classification: Evangelical Christianity
- Theology: Baptist
- Associations: Baptist World Alliance
- Headquarters: Freetown, Sierra Leone
- Origin: 1974
- Congregations: 49
- Members: 24,000
- Primary schools: 49
- Secondary schools: 17
- Seminaries: Baptist Theological Seminar, Lunsar
- Official website: bcsl-baptist-convention-sierra-leone.com

The Baptist Convention of Sierra Leone is a Baptist Christian denomination in Sierra Leone. It is affiliated with the Baptist World Alliance. The headquarters is in Freetown.

== History ==
The Baptist Convention of Sierra Leone has its origins in a Canadian mission of the preacher David George in 1792 and the support of the Jamaica Baptist Union. It is officially founded in 1974. According to a census published by the association in 2023, it claimed 49 churches and 24,000 members.

== Schools ==
The convention has 49 primary schools, 17 secondary schools.

It has 1 affiliated theological institute, the Baptist Theological Seminar, Lunsar.

== Health Services ==
The convention has 2 health centers.
