= Njala, Moyamba =

Njala
- Location in Sierra Leone
- Coordinates: 8°07′N 12°04′W
- Country: Sierra Leone
- Province: Southern Province
- District: Moyamba District
- Time zone: UTC-5 (GMT)

Njala is a town in Moyamba District in the Southern Province, Sierra Leone. It is 200 km east of Freetown and is home to Njala University, the second largest university in Sierra Leone, after Fourah Bay College. The university attracts student from many West African countries.
