= Goderich, Sierra Leone =

Goderich, Western Area
- Location in Sierra Leone
- Coordinates: 8°26′N 13°17′W
- Country: Sierra Leone
- Region: Western Area
- District: Western Area Rural District

Population (2004)
  - Total: 19,209
- Time zone: UTC-5

Goderich is an affluent suburb in the west end of Freetown, Sierra Leone's capital. Goderich lies about 13 miles (20 kilometers) from downtown Freetown. Goderich had a population 19,209 in the 2004 census Goderich has a high standard of living and is the wealthiest neighborhood in Freetown.

Notable current residents of Goderich include a former president of Sierra Leone, Ernest Bai Koroma, and a former vice president of Sierra Leone, Solomon Berewa.
