= Wusu Sannoh =

Sierra Leonean politician

Wusu Sannoh is a Sierra Leonean politician. Sannoh served as mayor of Bo City Council from 2004 until December 2012. Sannoh was a member of the Sierra Leone People's Party.
