= Bo Rangers F.C. =

Association football club in Sierra Leone

Bo Rangers FC
- Full name: Bo Rangers Football Club
- Nickname: The Elephants of Bo
- Founded: 1954
- Ground: Southern Arena Stadium; Bo, Sierra Leone
- Capacity: 6,000
- Chairman: Babadi Kamara
- Manager: Abdul Karim Bangura
- Coach: John Keister
- League: Sierra Leone National Premier League
- 2025–26: Champions (out of 18 clubs)
Home colours	Away colours

Bo Rangers Football Club commonly known as Bo Rangers is a Sierra Leonean professional football club based in the country's second largest city of Bo. They are currently a member of the Sierra Leone National Premier League, the highest division of football league in Sierra Leone. Bo Rangers have an intense rivalry with city rivals Nepean Stars. The club supporters are primarily from Bo District. Bo Rangers won their first item of silverware in 2022, winning the 2021–22 Sierra Leone National Premier League, and followed it up with another league title in 2023.

== Honours ==
=== Domestic ===
- Sierra Leone National Premier League
  - Champions (3): 2021–22, 2022–23, 2023–24
- Sierra Leone Football Association Cup (FA Cup) 2023-2024
- Community Shield 2023-2024

== Performance in CAF competitions ==
- CAF Champions League: 3 appearance

2022 - 2023 - First Preliminary Round
2023 - 2024 - Second Preliminary Round
2024 - 2025 - First Preliminary Round

== Coaches ==
- Mohammed Regers
- Vandy Massaquoi
- Solomon Williams
- Stephen Morseray
