= Sierra Leonean FA Cup =

Football competition in Sierra Leone

Sierra Leone FA Cup, commonly known as the FA Cup, is the national knockout cup competition in Sierra Leone. It was established in 1967. The competition is run by the Sierra Leone Football Association. Cup winners qualify for the CAF Confederation Cup (from 1975 to 2003 cup winners qualified for the now-defunct African Cup Winners' Cup).

== 2014 FA Cup ==
The 2014 FA Cup began on 9 February 2014 with the matches of Round 1. The winner qualifies for the 2015 CAF Confederation Cup.

== Participants ==
A total of 170 teams; 14 Premier League clubs, 56 Division I and 100 Division II teams will compete in the 2014 competition. The 2014 FA Cup will be organized in two different stages. In the first stage matches will be played among the First and Second Division teams in each of the Districts whilst the second stage, starting from the Round of 32, will involve the 14 Premier League clubs and 18 qualifiers from the first stage (12 District winners and 6 teams from the Western Area).

== Teams qualified for phase II ==
Final 32 teams:

14 Premier League teams, that received a bye to phase II: Bo Rangers (Bo), Kamboi Eagles (Kenema), Gem Stars (Tongo), Diamond Stars (Koidu), East End Lions (Freetown), Mighty Blackpool (Freetown), FC Kallon (Freetown), Central Parade (Freetown), Old Edwardians (Freetown), Ports Authority (Freetown), RSLAF (Freetown), Freetown City (Freetown), Anti Drugs Strikers (Freetown), FC Johansen (Freetown).

18 Division teams qualified from phase I: Edmond Michael Foundation (Bo, 1.Div.), Kahunla Rangers (Kenema, 1.Div.), Sky Eagles (Koidu Town, 1.Div.) Bai Bureh Warriors (Port Loko, 1.Div.), Alan Thababan (Makeni, 1.Div.), Teoma Jagoh (Kailahun, 1.Div.), Kholifa Stars (Magburaka 1.Div.), Wanjama Stars (Pujehun 1.Div.), Bintumani Scorpions (Kabala 1.Div.), Grassfield United (Moyamba 2.Div.), Central Rangers (Moinba Town 2.Div.), Sunday Foundation (Kambia 2.Div.), Nottingham Forest (S/L) (Freetown 2.Div.), Ibrahim FC (Freetown 2.Div.), Dollarosa (Freetown 1.Div.), Real Mack (Freetown 1.Div.), B-Strikers (Freetown 2.Div.), VEM FC (Freetown 2.Div.).

== Winners ==
- 1973 : East End Lions (Freetown)
- 1974-77 : Unknown
- 1978 : Bai Bureh Warriors (Port Loko)
- 1979 : Wusum Stars (Bombali)
- 1980 : East End Lions (Freetown)
- 1981 : Kamboi Eagles (Kenema)
- 1982 : Bai Bureh Warriors (Port Loko)
- 1983 : Mighty Blackpool (Freetown)
- 1984 : Old Edwardians (Freetown)
- 1985 : Kamboi Eagles (Kenema)
- 1986 : Real Republicans (Freetown)
- 1987 : Unknown
- 1988 : Mighty Blackpool (Freetown)
- 1989 : East End Lions (Freetown)
- 1990 : Ports Authority F.C. (Freetown)
- 1991 : Ports Authority F.C. (Freetown)
- 1992 : Diamond Stars (Kono)
- 1993 : Unknown
- 1994 : Mighty Blackpool (Freetown)
- 1995-99 : Not played
- 2000 : Mighty Blackpool (Freetown)
- 2001 : Old Edwardians (Freetown)
- 2002 : Not played
- 2003 : Kallon F.C. (Freetown)
- 2004 : Ports Authority F.C. (Freetown)
- 2005 : Old Edwardians (Freetown)
- 2006 : Unknown
- 2007 : Kallon F.C. (Freetown)
- 2008-13 : Not played
- 2014 : Kamboi Eagles F.C. (Kenema) 1-1 (aet; 3-2 pen.) East End Lions F.C. (Freetown)
- 2015 : Unknown
- 2016 : F.C. Johansen (Freetown) 1-0 RSLAF F.C. (Makeni)
- 2017-22 : Not played
- 2024 : TBD
