= Ibrahim Bah =

Sierra Leonean footballer

Personal information
- Date of birth: 8 March 1969 (age 57)
- Place of birth: Kono District, Sierra Leone
- Position: Defender

Senior career*
Years	Team	Apps	(Gls)
1995–1996	Ports Authority		
1998–2000	Shepshed Dynamo		

International career
1995–2000	Sierra Leone	14	(3)
- * Club domestic league appearances and goals

Ibrahim "Inspector" Bah (born 8 March 1969) is a Sierra Leonean former professional footballer who played as a defender. His nickname amongst Sierra Leonean football fans is 'Inspector' Bah.

== Career ==
Bah played in the Sierra Leone national team's successful 1995 Coupe Amilcar Cabral side, scoring twice in the group stage. He participated in the 1996 African Cup of Nations finals in South Africa, starting all three of Sierra Leone's matches as they were knocked out in the group stage.

In 1995–96 he was playing club football for Ports Authority.

He is now technical director of the Sierra Leone Football Association (SLFA).
