= Freetown City F.C. =

Sierra Leonean football club

Freetown City
- Full name: Freetown City Football Club
- Ground: National Stadium; Freetown, Sierra Leone
- Capacity: 45,000
- Chairman: Abdulai Dumbuya
- Manager: John Ajina Sesay
- League: Second Division (II)
- 2025–2026: 18th in Sierra Leone National Premier League

Freetown City Football Club, formerly known as Freetown United, is a Sierra Leonean football club based in Freetown, Sierra Leone. The club is currently playing in the Sierra Leone National Premier League, the highest football league in Sierra Leone. Freetown United was once one of the biggest football club in Sierra Leone during the 1960s and 1970s.

== Honours ==
- Sierra Leone National Premier League champions: 1

1989

== Performance in CAF competitions ==
- African Cup of Champions Clubs: 1 appearance

1990: First Round
