= East End Lions F.C. =

Association football club in Sierra Leone

East End Lions
- Full name: East End Lions
- Nicknames: Red Roaring Lions, The Killers
- Founded: 1928; 98 years ago
- Ground: Trade Center Field; Freetown, Sierra Leone
- Capacity: 5,000
- Chairman: Amb. Anthony Navo Jnr
- Coach: Isaac Sarfo
- League: Sierra Leone National Premier League
- 2025–2026: 5th
Home colours

East End Lions is a Sierra Leonean professional football club based in the capital Freetown. They play in the Sierra Leone National Premier League, the top football league in Sierra Leone. East End Lions represents the East End of Freetown, and play their home games at the National Stadium. The head coach, appointed in 2018 is John Keister.

East End Lions are one of the two biggest and most successful football clubs in Sierra Leonean football history (along with their main rivalry Mighty Blackpool). The club was founded in 1928 and is one of the oldest football clubs in Sierra Leone.

== Rivalry ==
East End Lions have an intense rivalry with fellow powerhouse Mighty Blackpool who have won the National League 10 times. When these two clubs play each other at the national stadium in Freetown, tickets are often sold out; there is usually a heavy police presence to prevent clashes between their supporters,

== Achievements ==
- Sierra Leone League
  - Champions (13): 1977, 1980, 1985, 1992, 1993, 1994, 1997, 1999, 2005, 2009, 2010, 2019, 2025
- Sierra Leonean FA Cup
  - Winners (3): 1973, 1980, 1989.

== Performance in CAF competitions ==
- CAF Champions League: 4 appearances

1998 – Preliminary round
2006 – Preliminary round
2010 – Preliminary round
2011 – Preliminary round

- African Cup of Champions Clubs: 3 appearances

1981: First Round
1986: withdrew in preliminary round
1994: First Round

- CAF Cup: 1 appearance

1992 – First Round

- CAF Cup Winners' Cup: 1 appearance

1990 – Second Round

== Former managers ==
- (Sierra Leone) Victoria Conteh
