= Sierra Leone National Premier League =

Sierra Leonean association football league

- Founded: 1967; 59 years ago
- Country: Sierra Leone
- Confederation: CAF
- Number of clubs: 18
- Level on pyramid: 1
- Relegation to: Sierra Leone National First Division
- Domestic cup: Sierra Leonean FA Cup
- International cup(s): Champions League; Confederation Cup
- Current champions: Bo Rangers F.C. (2025–2026)
- Most championships: East End Lions (12 titles)
- Broadcaster: AYV
- Website: slpremierleague.com
- Current: 2026-27 Sierra Leone National Premier League

Sierra Leone National Premier League is a professional football league in Sierra Leone. It was founded in 1967. The league is sponsored by Leone Rock Metal Group. East End Lions and Mighty Blackpool are the two biggest and most successful clubs. The National Premier League is controlled by the Sierra Leone Football Association. The season runs from December to July.

== Structure ==
Eighteen clubs compete in the league, playing each other twice, once at home and once away. At the end of the season the bottom three clubs are relegated to the Sierra Leone National First Division, the second highest football league in Sierra Leone. The champions qualify for the CAF Champions League, while the second place team or the winner of the Sierra Leonean FA Cup will qualify for the CAF Confederation Cup. If the winner of the Sierra Leonean FA Cup has already qualify for the CAF Champions League, the Confederations Cup spot will go to the second place team in the table.

== 2024/2025 Clubs ==
Club	City	Stadium	Capacity
Abacha City	Freetown	Approved School	
Bai Bureh Warriors	Port Loko	New PortLoko Field	2,500
Bhantal FC	Freetown	SLFA Academy	2,000
Bo Rangers	Bo	Southern Arena	6,000
Bullum Stars	Lungi	New PortLoko Field	2,500
Diamond Stars	Koidu Town	Koidu Sports Stadium	3,000
East End Lions	Freetown	Approved School	5,000
Freetown City Football Club	Freetown	Approved School	5,000
Kamboi Eagles	Kenema	Kenema Town Field	7,000
Kallon FC	Freetown	Approved School	5,000
Luawa FC	Freetown	SLFA Academy	2,000
Mighty Blackpool	Freetown	SLFA Academy	2,000
SLIFA	Freetown	SLFA Academy	2,000
Old Edwardians	Freetown	SLFA Academy	2,000
Ports Authority	Freetown	Approved School	5,000
Star Sports	Freetown	SLFA Academy	2,000
Wilberforce Strikers	Freetown	SLFA Academy	2,000
Wusum Stars	Makeni	Wusum Field	4,000

== Previous winners ==
Years	Champions
1967	Mighty Blackpool (1)
Not held between 1968 and 1972
1973	Ports Authority (1)
1974	Mighty Blackpool (2)
Not held between 1975 and 1977
1978	Mighty Blackpool (3)
1979	Mighty Blackpool (4)
1980	East End Lions (1)
1981	Real Republicans (1)
1982	Sierra Fisheries (1)
1983	Real Republicans (2)
1984	Real Republicans (3)
1985	East End Lions (2)
1986	Sierra Fisheries (2)
1987	Sierra Fisheries (3)
1988	Mighty Blackpool (5)
1989	Freetown City (1)
1990	Old Edwardians (1)
1991	Mighty Blackpool (6)
1992	East End Lions (3)
1993	East End Lions (4)
1994	East End Lions (5)
1995	Mighty Blackpool (7)
1996	Mighty Blackpool (8)
1997	East End Lions (6)
1998	Mighty Blackpool (9)
1999	East End Lions (7)
2000	Mighty Blackpool (10)
2001	Mighty Blackpool (11)
Not held between 2002 and 2004
2005	East End Lions (8)
2006	Kallon (4)
2007	Not held
2008	Ports Authority (2)
2009	East End Lions (9)
2010	East End Lions (10)
2011	Ports Authority (3)
2012	Diamond Stars (1)
2013	Diamond Stars (2)
2014	East End Lions (11)
2015	Not held
2016	Not finished
2017	Not held
2018	Not held
2019	East End Lions (12)
2020	Not finished due to COVID-19
2021–22	Bo Rangers (1)
2022–23	Bo Rangers (2)
2023–24	Bo Rangers (3)
2024–25	East End Lions (13)

== Performance by club ==
Club	City	Titles	Last title
East End Lions	Freetown	13	2024–25
Mighty Blackpool	Freetown	11	2000–01
Kallon (includes Sierra Fisheries)	Freetown	4	2005–06
Bo Rangers	Bo	3	2023–24
Real Republicans	Freetown	3	1984
Ports Authority	Freetown	3	2010–11
Diamond Stars	Koidu	2	2012–13
Freetown City (includes Freetown United)	Freetown	1	1989
Old Edwardians	Freetown	1	1990

== Top goalscorers ==
Season	Player	Club	Goals
2000–01	(Sierra Leone) Kelfala Marah	Mighty Blackpool	5
2000–01	Abdulai K. Conteh	Old Edwardians	5
2007–08	(Sierra Leone) Lahai "Chandus" Freeman		10
2011–12	(Sierra Leone) James Bangura	Central Parade	8
2019	(Sierra Leone) Musa Noah Kamara	East End Lions	15
2021–22	(Sierra Leone) Musa Noah Kamara	Bo Rangers	19
2022–23	(Sierra Leone) Alie Conteh	Kallon	14
2023–24	(Sierra Leone) Musa Noah Kamara	Bo Rangers	15

Most time goalscorers

- 3 times
  - Musa Noah Kamara (2019, 2021–22, 2023–24)
