= Gbara =

Governing body of the Mali Empire

The Gbara (Bambara pronunciation: [ɡ͡baɽa]; now spelled and pronounced as Bara or Gara in those Manding languages lacking /ɡ͡b/) or Great Assembly was the deliberative body of the Mali Empire, which ruled much of West Africa during the Middle Ages. It was first formed in 1235 on the orders of Sundiata in the Mandinka constitution known as the Kouroukan Fouga.

== Function ==
The Gbara was made up of 32 members from around 29 mostly Mandinka clans. Members of these clans had aided Sundiata in his overthrow of Soumaoro Kante and were given a voice in the government of a new Manden federation, the Manden Kurufa. The descendants of these clans occupied posts in the Gbara, and checked the power of the federal emperor, the Mansa. It was presided over by a belen-tigui (or master of ceremonies) who recognized anyone who wanted to speak, including the Mansa.

The first Gbara decreed that the Emperor comes from the line of Sundiata, while the Princess are mandated to take a wife from the Conde clan.

== Clans ==
The Gbara was divided into four voting blocs divided among military, political, religious and economic lines. The Djon-Tan-Nor-Woro (sometimes cited as the Ton-Ta-Jon), meaning carriers of quivers, were the military wing of the Gbara, responsible for leading the army and sometimes governing provinces (tinkurus) or counties (kafos). The purely political bloc of the Gbara was the clans of Maghan (literally 'Princely Clans'). This group included the imperial clans and related clans that could also ascend to the throne. The constitution of the empire also included religious (that is traditional African religion) clans serving as marabouts (or Islamic guides to the nobility). This group also functioned as diviners able to interpret omens and other happenings. Lastly, there were the clans of Nyamakala ('wielders of Nyama'). Nyama is the power or energy that flows within and between everything, and its skilled manipulation is necessary to perform certain functions, especially smithing or serving as a chronicler/bard/griot (jeli / djeli).

The 16 Djon-Tan-Nor-Woro ('Carriers of Quivers') clans responsible for defense, and the descendants of Sundiata Keita's generals and best soldiers, are:

- Dansouba
- Diaby (Jab(b)y)
- Diakité (Jakite)
- Diallo (Jallow)
- Diawara (Jawara)
- Fofana
- Kamara (Camara)
- Kamissoko
- Koita
- Kondé (the clan of the Sankar-Zouma)
- Koroma
- Magassouba
- Sako
- Sangaré (Sankareh)
- Sidibé
- Traoré (Trawore/Trawally)

The 4 Maghan (Princely) clans, responsible for leadership, are:

- Danhou/Douno/Dan/Somono/Soumano/Mano (the clan of the Dyi-Tigi or "master of waters", responsible for river travel and fishing)
- Keita (the clan of the mansas)
- Konaté
- Koulibaly (Coulibaly/Krubally/Kora)

The 5 Mori-Kanda-Lolou ('Guardians of the Faith'), clans responsible for traditional African religion teaching and advice, are:

- Bérété
- Cissé (Ceesay/Sesay)
- Diané (Janneh)
- Koma
- Sylla (Sillah)

The 7 Nyamakala ('Wielders of Nyama, the power of life/creative force), clans responsible for products, are:

- Diabate (Jeliw / Djeliw; chroniclers and praise singers)
- Kanté (Numun-Fin; blacksmiths, whose wives are often potters)
- Kamara (Numun-Siaki; these men work precious metals into jewellery)
- Kamara (Finè; mediators of disputes and announcers; talkers without music)
- Koroma (Noumoun-Kule; these men work wood to make art)
- Kouyaté (Jeliw / Djeliw of the Mansa and Belen-Tigui of the Gbara)
- Sylla (Garanke = 'leatherworkers' or makers of shoes, harnesses, and cushions)

== See also ==
- Mali Empire
- Kouroukan Fouga
- Majlis
- Shura
- Majlis ash-Shura
- Jirga
- Kurultai
- Divan
