= List of senators of French West Africa =

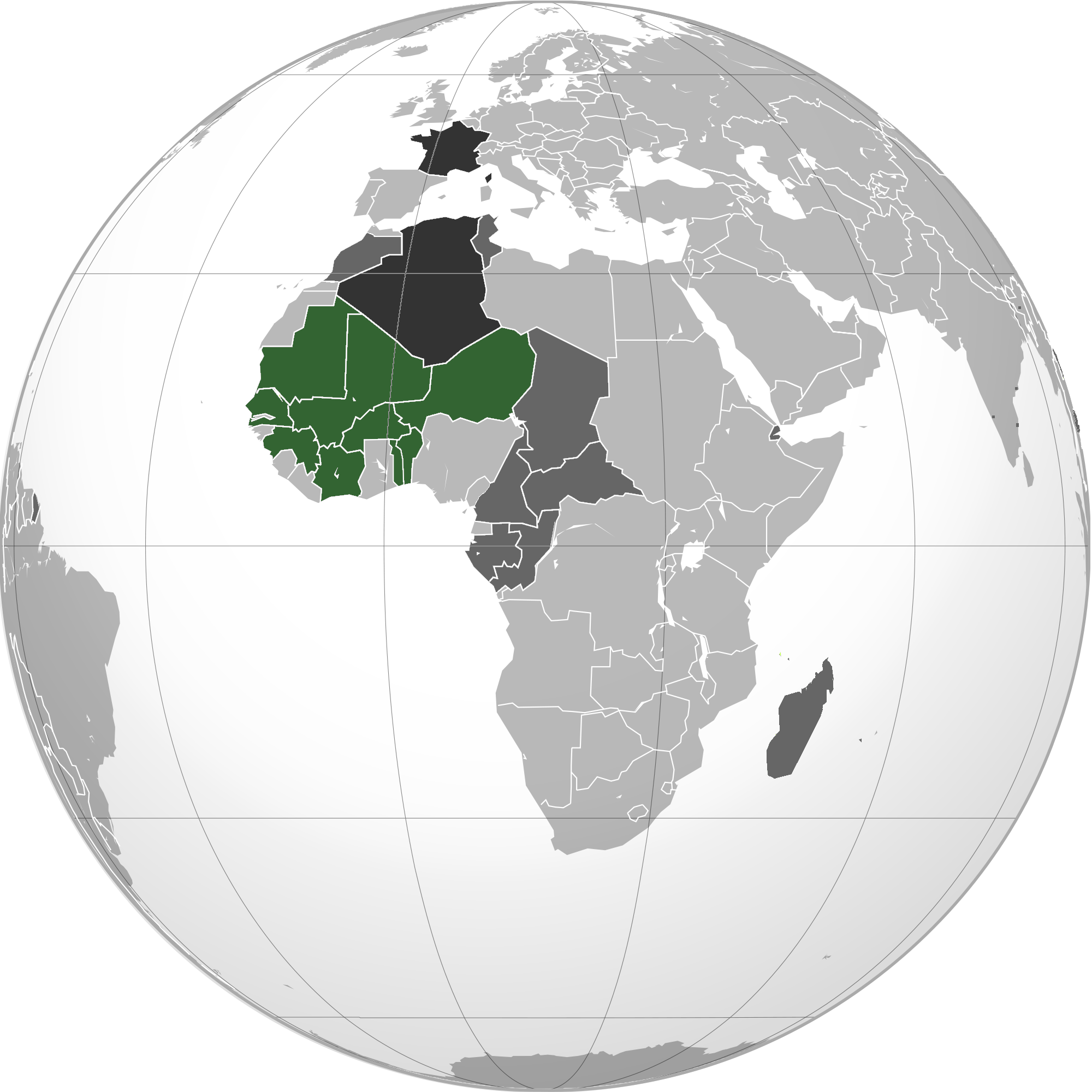
French African colonies after World War II. French West Africa in dark green.

Following is a list of senators of French West Africa, people who represented the colonies in French West Africa in the Senate of France during the French Fourth Republic (1945–1959). All of these colonies became independent countries between 1958 and 1960.

== Dahomey ==
Location of Dahomey

Senators for Dahomey (now Benin) under the French Fourth Republic were:

In office	Name	Group	Notes
1947–1955	Louis Ignacio-Pinto	Indépendants d'Outre-Mer	
1947–1948	Émile Poisson	Mouvement Républicain Populaire	
1948–1949	Albert Marescaux	Action Démocratique et Républicaine	Election invalidated 25 January 1949
1948–1955	Émile Poisson	Mouvement Républicain Populaire	
1955–1959	Maximilien Quenum-Possy-Berry	Républicains Indépendants	
1955–1959	Émile Derlin Zinsou	Indépendants d'Outre-Mer	

France granted autonomy to the Republic of Dahomey in 1958 and full independence on 1 August 1960.

== Guinea ==
Location of Guinea

Senators for French Guinea under the French Fourth Republic were:

In office	Name	Group	Notes
1947–1950	Jean-Baptiste Ferracci	Socialiste	Died in office 9 December 1950
1947–1948	Fodé Mamadou Toure	Socialiste	
1948–1955	Raphaël Saller	Indépendants d'Outre-Mer	
1951–1953	Louis-Désiré Marcou	Gauche Démocratique / Rassemblement des Gauches Républicaines	Died in office 31 July 1953
1953–1958	Raymond Susset	Républicains Sociaux	
1955–1958	Fodé Mamadou Toure	Socialiste	

On 2 October 1958 Guinea proclaimed itself a sovereign and independent republic with Ahmed Sékou Touré as president.

== Ivory Coast ==
Location of Ivory Coast

Senators for the Ivory Coast under the French Fourth Republic were:

In office	Name	Group	Notes
1947–1948	Henri Guissou	Communiste	Until 26 June 1948 (elected deputy)
1947–1948	Étienne Djaument	Union Républicaine et Résistante pour l'Union Française	
1947–1958	Marc Rucart	Gauche Démocratique / Rassemblement des Gauches Républicaines	
1947–1953	Gaston Lagarosse	Gauche Démocratique / Rassemblement des Gauches Républicaines	Died in office 21 March 1953
1947–1955	Philippe Franceschi	Union Républicaine et Résistante pour l'Union Française	
1948–1950	Victor Biaka-Boda	Rassemblement Démocratique Africain	Died in office 28 January 1950
1953–1959	Armand Josse	Républicains Indépendants	
1953–1956	Daniel Ouezzin Coulibaly	not aligned	Until 2 January 1956 (elected deputy)
1955–1959	Loubo Augustin Djessou	Rassemblement Démocratique Africain	
1956–1959	Joseph Perrin	Union Démocratique et Socialiste de la Résistance / Rassemblement Démocratique Africain	

In 1958 Ivory Coast became an autonomous member of the French Community and in 1960 the country became independent.

== Mauritania ==
Location of Mauritania

Senators for Mauritania under the French Fourth Republic were:

In office	Name	Group	Notes
1946–1948	Richard Brunot	Socialiste	
1948–1959	Yvon Razac	Mouvement Républicain Populaire	

Mauritania became an independent nation in November 1960.

== Niger ==
Location of Niger

Senators for Niger under the French Fourth Republic were:

In office	Name	Group	Notes
1947–1948	Mohamadou Djibrilla Maïga	Union Républicaine et Résistante pour l'Union Française	
1947–1948	Raoul Streiff	Républicains Indépendants	
1948–1959	Gaston Fourrier	Rassemblement d'Outre-Mer	
1948–1952	Oumar Ba	not aligned	
1952–1958	Yacouba Sido	Indépendants d'Outre-Mer	
1958–1959	Issoufou Saidou Djermakoye	Rassemblement Démocratique Africain	

Niger became an autonomous state within the French Community on 4 December 1958. The country acquired full independence on 3 August 1960.

== Senegal ==
Location of Senegal

Senators for Senegal under the French Fourth Republic were:

In office	Name	Group	Notes
1946–1948	Alioune Diop	Socialiste	
1946–1952	Charles Cros	Socialiste	
1946–1952	Ousmane Diop Socé	Socialiste	
1948–1956	Mamadou Dia	Indépendants d'Outre-Mer	Until 7 February 1956 (elected deputy)
1952–1958	André Fousson	Indépendants d'Outre-Mer	
1952–1958	Louis Le Gros	Indépendants d'Outre-Mer	
1956–1959	Ibrahima Diallo	Socialiste	
1958–1959	André Guillabert	Socialiste	
1958–1959	Amadou Lamine-Gueye	Socialiste	

On 4 April 1959 Senegal and the French Sudan merged to form the Mali Federation, which became fully independent on 20 June 1960. The Federation broke up on 20 August 1960, when Senegal and French Sudan (renamed the Republic of Mali) each proclaimed independence.

== Sudan ==
Location of French Sudan (Mali)

Senators for the French Sudan (now Mali) under the French Fourth Republic were:

In office	Name	Group	Notes
1947–1948	Marius Moutet	Socialiste	Then senator for Drôme (1948–1959)
1947–1953	Félicien Cozzano	Action Démocratique et Républicaine	Died in office 10 September 1953
1947–1959	Amadou Doucoure	Socialiste	
1947–1958	Mamadou M'Bodje	Socialiste	Died in office 2 September 1958
1948–1959	Mahamane Haidara	not aligned	
1953–1955	Pierre Bertaux	not aligned	
1955–1959	René Fillon	Républicains Sociaux	

On 4 April 1959 Senegal and the French Sudan merged to form the Mali Federation, which became fully independent on 20 June 1960. The Federation broke up on 20 August 1960, when Senegal and French Sudan (renamed the Republic of Mali) each proclaimed independence.

== Togo ==
Location of Togo

Senators for French Togoland under the French Fourth Republic were:

In office	Name	Group	Notes
1946–1952	Lucius-Duquesnes Gustave	Socialiste	
1946–1952	Louis Siaut	Socialiste	
1952–1958	Robert Ajavon	Indépendants d'Outre-Mer	
1952–1958	Jacques Zele	Indépendants d'Outre-Mer	

French Togoland became an autonomous republic within the French union in 1955. On 27 April 1960 Togo became fully independent.

== Upper Volta ==
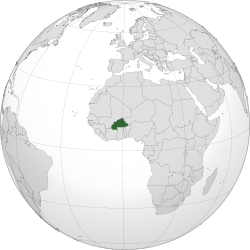
Location of Upper Volta

Senators for French Upper Volta (now Burkina Faso) under the French Fourth Republic were:

In office	Name	Group	Notes
1948–1959	Christophe Kalenzaga	Indépendants d'Outre-Mer	
1948–1952	Nouhoun Sigue	Républicains Indépendants	
1952–1958	Diongolo Traore	Indépendants d'Outre-Mer	
1958–1959	Blaise Bassoleth	Parti du Regroupement Africain et des Fédéralistes	
1958–1959	Bégnon-Damien Kone	Rassemblement Démocratique Africain	

Upper Volta became an autonomous republic in the French community on 11 December 1958. The country became fully independent on 5 August 1960.

== Sources ==
- Liste des anciens sénateurs de la IVème République par circonscription: Côte d'Ivoire (in French), Sénat de France
- Liste des anciens sénateurs de la IVème République par circonscription: Dahomey (in French), Sénat de France
- Liste des anciens sénateurs de la IVème République par circonscription: Guinée (in French), Sénat de France
- Liste des anciens sénateurs de la IVème République par circonscription: Haute-Volta (in French), Sénat de France
- Liste des anciens sénateurs de la IVème République par circonscription: Mauritanie (in French), Sénat de France
- Liste des anciens sénateurs de la IVème République par circonscription: Niger (in French), Sénat de France
- Liste des anciens sénateurs de la IVème République par circonscription: Sénégal (in French), Sénat de France
- Liste des anciens sénateurs de la IVème République par circonscription: Soudan (in French), Sénat de France
- Liste des anciens sénateurs de la IVème République par circonscription: Togo (in French), Sénat de France
