= Diawara =

Diawara may refer to:

== Place ==
- Diawara, Senegal

== People with the surname ==
Diawara is the French transcription of a surname of Manding origin (the English transcription is Jawara). Notable people with this name include:

- Abdoulaye Diawara (footballer, born 1981) (born 1981), Ivorian footballer
- Abdoulaye Diawara (footballer, born 1983) (born 1983), French-born Malian footballer, brother of Fousseni and Samba
- Abdourahamane Diawara (born 1978), Guinean swimmer
- Aïsseta Diawara (born 1989), French athlete
- Amadou Diawara (born 1997), Guinean footballer
- Ange Diawara (1941–1973), Congolese politician and military figure
- Baba Diawara (born 1988), Senegalese footballer
- Banou Diawara (born 1992), Burkinabé footballer
- Daba Diawara (born 1951), Malian politician
- Demba Diawara (born 1931), imam and village leader in Senegal
- Diéné Diawara (born 1988), Malian basketball player, sister of Lamine and Nare
- Djeli Moussa Diawara (aka Jali Musa Jawara; born 1962), Guinean musician
- Djibril Diawara (born 1975), French-Senegalese footballer
- Fatoumata Diawara (born 1982), Malian folk musician
- Fousseni Diawara (born 1980), French-born Malian footballer, brother of Abdoulaye and Samba
- Hamidou Diawara (born 1960), Senegalese sprinter
- Ismael Diawara (born 1994), Swedish-born Malian footballer
- Kaba Diawara (born 1975), French-born Guinean footballer
- Kadidia Diawara (born 1986), Malian footballer
- Kandet Diawara (born 2000), French footballer
- Lamine Diawara (born 1971), Malian basketball player, brother of Diéné and Nare
- Lamine Diawara (footballer) (born 1986), Malian footballer
- Mahamadou Diawara (born 2005), French footballer
- Mamadou Diawara (ethnologist) (born 1958), Malian-German ethnologist at the Goethe University Frankfurt
- Mamadou Diawara (born 1989), French footballer
- Manthia Diawara (born 1953), Malian professor of comparative literature
- Mariam Sy Diawara, Ivorian businesswoman
- Mohamed Diawara (born 2005), French basketball player
- Moussa Diawara (born 1994), Guinean footballer
- Nare Diawara (born 1983), Malian basketball player, sister of Diéné and Lamine
- Noom Diawara (born 1978), French actor
- Ousmane Diawara (born 1999), Swedish-Malian footballer
- Samba Diawara (born 1978), Malian footballer, brother of Abdoulaye and Fousseni
- Sankhoun Diawara (born 2006), French footballer
- Sekou Diawara (born 2004), Belgian footballer
- Souleymane Diawara (born 1978), Senegalese football defender
- Viktoras Diawara (born 1978), Lithuanian-Malian musician
- Yakhouba Diawara (born 1982), French basketball player in the National Basketball Association
