= Cissé =

Cissé is a common West African name of Soninke origin, meaning "white horse".

Notable people with the surname include:

== Sports ==
- Abdoulaye Cissé (born 1983), Burkinabé footballer
- Aboubacar Cissé (born 1969), Ivorian footballer
- Aliou Cissé (born 1976), Senegalese footballer and coach
- Alphadjo Cisse (born 2006), Italian footballer
- Amadou Cissé (born 1985), French-Guinean footballer
- Amadou Cissé (footballer, born 2006), Guinean football centre-back
- Babacar Cissé (born 1975), Senegalese basketball player
- Brahima Cissé (born 1976), Burkinabé footballer
- Djibril Cissé (born 1981), French footballer
- Édouard Cissé (born 1978), French footballer
- Fousseyni Cissé (born 1989), French footballer
- Ibrahima Cissé (born 1994), Belgian-Guinean footballer
- Kalifa Cissé (born 1984), Malian footballer
- Mangué Cissé (1945–2009), Ivorian footballer
- Mohamed Cissé (born 1982), Guinean footballer
- Morlaye Cissé (born 1983), Guinean footballer
- Ousmane Cissé (born 1982), Malian basketball player
- Papiss Cissé (born 1985), Senegalese footballer
- Salim Cissé (born 1992), Guinean footballer
- Sarah Cissé (born 2007), French basketball player
- Sekou Cissé (born 1985), Ivorian footballer

== Others ==
- Abdoulkader Cissé (born 1955) Burkinabé politician
- Amadou Cissé (born 1948), Nigerien politician, former Prime Minister of Niger (1995; 1996–97)
- Boubou Cissé (born 1974), Malian politician
- Mohamed Cissé (born 1998), Ivorian/Malian investor
- Inna Sissoko Cissé, Malian government official
- Madjiguène Cissé (1951–2023), Senegalese activist
- Massata Cissé (born 1961), Burkinabé woman, first female truck driver in West Africa
- Shaykh Hassan Cissé (1945–2008), Senegalese Islamic scholar
- Souleymane Cissé (1940–2025), Malian film director
- Soumaïla Cissé (1949–2020), Malian politician
- Tanja Cissé (born 1980), Liechtenstein politician
- Youssouf Tata Cissé (1935–2013), Malian ethnologist and historian

== See also ==
- Cisse (disambiguation)
- Ceesay
