= Diallo =

Diallo (pronounced jah-loh; Fula: 𞤔𞤢𞤤𞥆𞤮, romanized: Jallo, [dʒalo, ɟalo]) is a French pronunciation of a Fulani surname of Fula origin (English transcriptions are Jalloh and Jallow; the Portuguese and Creole transcription is Djaló). It is one of several common surnames used among the Fula.

Notable people with the name include:

== People ==
=== Surname ===
- Abdul Diallo (born 1996), Burkinabé footballer
- Alpha Yaya Diallo, Guinean-Canadian guitarist, singer and songwriter
- Amad Diallo (born 2002), Ivorian footballer
- Amadou Diallo (1975–1999), victim of police shooting in New York City
- Amadou Diallo (born 1994), French-Guinean footballer
- Amadou Diallo (born 2003), English footballer
- Aminata Diallo (born 1995), French footballer
- Anthony Diallo (born 1956), Tanzanian politician
- Assane Diallo (born 1975), Senegalese runner
- Ayuba Suleiman Diallo (1701–1773), Muslim victim of the Atlantic slave trade
- Boubacar Diallo, Burkinabé filmmaker and writer
- Boubacar Biro Diallo (1922–2025), Guinean politician
- Boubacar Telli Diallo (1926–1976), Guinean Minister of Justice, magistrate and lawyer
- Boubacar Yacine Diallo (born 1955), Guinean journalist, writer and government minister
- Boubacar Diallo (born 1985), Guinean footballer
- Boubacar Diallo (born 1960), Senegalese sprinter
- Boubou Diallo, (born 2003), Malian footballer
- Boucader Diallo, Malian footballer
- Cellou Dalein Diallo, Guinean former Prime Minister, Economist and politician
- Cheick Diallo (born 1996), Malian basketball player
- Delphine Diallo (born 1977), French-Senegalese photographer
- Djenabou Diallo-Hartmann (born 1985), German politician
- Drissa Diallo, Guinean-French footballer
- Gabriel Diallo, Canadian tennis player
- Hama Arba Diallo, Burkinabé politician
- Hamed Modibo Diallo (born 1976), Ivorian footballer
- Hamidou Diallo (born 1998), American basketball player
- Ibrahim Diallo (born 1996), Malian footballer
- Ibrahima Diallo (1915–1958), Senegalese politician
- Ibrahima Diallo (born 1959), Senegalese judoka
- Ibrahima Diallo (born 1985), Guinean footballer
- Ibrahima Diallo (born 1993), English Paralympic footballer
- Ibrahima Diallo (born 1999), French footballer
- Khadidiatou Diallo, Senegalese activist
- Lassana Diallo (born 1984), Malian footballer
- Mamadou Alimou Diallo (born 1984), Guinean footballer
- Mamadou Diallo (born 1971), Senegalese football striker
- Mamadou Diallo (born 1954), Senegalese triple jumper
- Mamadou Diallo (born 1982), Malian retired footballer
- Mamadou Sylla Diallo (born 1994), Senegalese footballer
- Marcel Diallo (born 1972), American musician, poet, artist and activist
- Mariam Aladji Boni Diallo Beninese politician
- Marie Madeleine Diallo (born 1948), Senegalese actress
- Mohamed Ali Diallo (born 1978), Burkinabé footballer
- Mohammed Diallo (born 1983), Ivorian footballer
- Nafissatou Niang Diallo (1941–1982), Senegalese writer
- Omar Diallo (born 1972), Senegalese footballer
- Rabiatou Sérah Diallo (1949–2023) Guinean trade unionist
- Rokhaya Diallo (born 1978), French journalist, author, filmmaker, and activist
- Saifoulaye Diallo (1923–1981), Guinean politician
- Salif Diallo (1957–2017), Burkinabé politician
- Samba Diallo (born 2003), Senegalese footballer
- Sea Diallo (1958–2025), Senegalese painter and plastic artist
- Sidibé Aminata Diallo (born 1950, Malian academic and politician
- Yaya Diallo (born 1946), Malian musician and author
- Youssouf Diallo (born 1984), Guinean footballer
- Zoom Diallo (born 2005), American basketball player
- Zoumana Diallo (born 2005), French footballer

=== First name ===
- Diallo Guidileye (born 1989), Mauritanian-French footballer
- Diallo Telli (1925–1977), Guinean diplomat and politician
