= Abdoulaye Diawara =

Abdoulaye Diawara may refer to:

- Abdoulaye Diawara (footballer, born 1981) (1981–2024), Ivorian football defender
- Abdoulaye Diawara (footballer, born 1983), Malian football midfielder
