= Diané =

Diané can be a feminine given name or a surname. Notable people with the name include:

== Given name ==
- Diané Mariam Koné, Malian politician

== Surname ==
- Amara Diané (born 1982), Ivorian football forward
- Arafan Diané (born 2007), Guinean basketball center
- Karim Diané, American actor and singer
- Lansana Diané, Guinean general and minister
- Moustapha Diané, Guinean politician
- Nasseneba Touré Diané, Ivorian politician
- Taifour Diané (born 1972), Guinean football manager and former football forward

== See also ==
- Diane (given name)
