= Djaló =

Djaló is the Portuguese and Creole transcription of a surname of Fula origin (English transcriptions are Jalloh and Jallow; the French transcription is Diallo). Notable people with the surname include:

- Adiato Djaló Nandigna (born 1958), Bissau-Guinean politician
- Aldair Baldé (Aldair Adulai Djaló Baldé, born 1992), Bissau-Guinean/Portuguese footballer
- Aliu Djaló (born 1992), Bissau-Guinean footballer
- Álvaro Djaló (born 1999), Spanish footballer
- Bacari Djaló (born 1983), Bissau-Guinean footballer
- Bobó Djalo (born 1963), Bissau-Guinean footballer
- Bubacar Djaló (born 1996), Bissau-Guinean footballer
- Idrissa Djaló (born 1962), Bissau-Guinean politician
- Malcom Adu Ares (Malcom Abdulai Ares Djaló, born 2001), Spanish footballer
- Mamadú Iaia Djaló (c. 1962–2021), Bissau-Guinean politician
- Mamadu Saliu Djaló Pires, Bissau-Guinean politician
- Marcelo Amado (Marcelo Amado Djaló Taritolay, born 1993), Bissau-Guinean/Spanish footballer
- Tiago Djaló (Tiago Emanuel Embaló Djaló, born 2000), Portuguese footballer
- Umaru Djaló (1940–2014), Bissau-Guinean politician
- Yannick Djaló (born 1986), Bissau-Guinean footballer
