= Isatou =

Isatou is a given name. People with the name include:

- Isatou Ceesay (born 1972), Gambian recycling activist
- Isatou Njie-Saidy (born 1952), former vice-president of the Gambia (1997–2017)
- Isatou Nyang (born 1984), Gambian Paralympic athlete
- Isatou Touray (born 1955), former vice-president of the Gambia (2019–2022)
- Satou Sabally (Isatou Sabally; born 1998), German-American basketball player
