= Konde =

Konde may refer to:

== Places ==
- Kondé, Benin
- Kondey or Kondē, Maldives
- Micheweni District (formerly Konde District), Tanzania

== Ethnic groups and languages ==
- Nyakyusa people
- Nyakyusa language
- Konde, a dialect of the Ronga language

== People with the surname ==
- Agnes Konde, Ugandan businesswoman
- Fundi Konde (1924–2000), Kenyan musician
- Oumar Kondé (born 1979), Swiss footballer of Congolese descent
