= Coulibaly =

Coulibaly is a common Bambara language surname in West Africa, especially in Mali and Ivory Coast. It may refer to:

== People ==
- Any of the Bambara Empire's founding Coulibaly dynasty, following Bitòn Coulibaly (1689–1755)
- Adama Coulibaly (born 1980), Malian footballer
- Adamo Coulibaly (born 1981), French footballer
- Aicha Coulibaly (born 2001), Malian basketball player
- Amadou Coulibaly (born 1984), Burkinabé footballer
- Amadou Gon Coulibaly (1959–2020), Prime Minister of the Ivory Coast
- Amedy Coulibaly (1982–2015), assailant in shootings related to the Hypercacher kosher supermarket siege
- Daniel Ouezzin Coulibaly (1909–1958), president of governing council of the French colony of Upper Volta
- Bilal Coulibaly (born 2004), French basketball player
- Bréhima Coulibaly, Malian diplomat, Ambassador of Mali to Russia in 2009–2022
- David Coulibaly (born 1978), Malian footballer
- Djibril Coulibaly (footballer, born 1987), Malian footballer
- Djibril Coulibaly (footballer, born 2008), French footballer
- Dramane Coulibaly (born 1979), Malian footballer
- Elimane Coulibaly (born 1980), Senegalese footballer
- Fatoumata Coulibaly, Malian actress and women's rights activist
- Fernand Coulibaly (born 1971), Malian former footballer
- Fousseny Coulibaly (born 1989), Ivorian footballer
- Gary Coulibaly (born 1986), French footballer
- Harouna Coulibaly (1962–2025), Nigerien writer and film director
- Ibrahim Coulibaly, rebel leader in Côte d'Ivoire during 1999 and 2002
- Kalifa Coulibaly (born 1991), Malian footballer
- Karim Coulibaly (footballer, born 1993) (born 1993), Senegalese-born French footballer
- Koman Coulibaly, Malian football referee
- Mamadou Coulibaly, several people
- Mamoutou Coulibaly (born 1984), Malian footballer
- Micheline Coulibaly (1950–2003), Ivorian writer
- Moussa Coulibaly, several people
- Souleymane Coulibaly, Ivorian footballer
- Soumaila Coulibaly (born 1978), Malian footballer
- Tanguy Coulibaly (born 2001), French footballer of Malian descent

== Other ==
- Coulibaly, a track from the 2003 album Dimanche à Bamako, a collaboration between Malian singers Amadou & Miriam and Franco-Spanish performer Manu Chao

== See also ==
- Koulibaly
