= Louis Gros =

Louis Gros may refer to:

- Louis Prosper Gros (1893–1973), flying ace during World War I
- Louis Le Gros (1893–1969), politician from Senegal
