= Sesay =

Sesay is a common surname among the Mandingo, Temne, Loko, Limba and Kuranko people of Sierra Leone, and may refer to:

- Alimamy Sesay (1987–), Sierra Leonean football player
- Ansu Sesay (1976–), American professional basketball player
- Benjamin Sesay (1981–), Sierra Leonean international football player
- Brima Sesay (1981–2009), Sierra Leonean international football goalkeeper
- David Sesay (1998–), British football player
- Hassan Koeman Sesay (1986–), Sierra Leonean international football player
- Hassan Mila Sesay (1987–), Sierra Leonean international football player
- Ibrahim Sesay, member of parliament of Sierra Leone
- Isha Sesay, British journalist of Sierra Leonean descent and anchor of CNN International
- Issa Hassan Sesay (1970–), served as senior officer and commander in the Revolutionary United Front and AFRC/RUF forces in their insurrection against the government of Sierra Leone
- Kadi Sesay, formally Kadiatu Sesay, former Sierra Leone Minister of Trade and Industry and mother of CNN International anchor Isha Sesay
- Kadija Sesay, also called Kadija George, is a British writer and poet of Sierra Leonean descent
- Lamin-Sullay Sesay (1965–2004), also called Lammin Sullay, Sierra Leonean writer and journalist
- Maria Sesay, Sierra Leonean media host and culture curator
- Muwahid Sesay (1984–), Sierra Leonean international football striker
- Sulaiman Sesay Fullah, Sierra Leonean international footballer
- Zainab Bangura (born Zainab Hawa Sesay, 1959–), Sierra Leone minister of foreign affairs
