= Abdoulaye Diabaté (pianist) =

Senegalese jazz pianist (1959–2025)

- Born: 1959
- Died: 16 January 2025 (aged 65); Boulogne-Billancourt, France
- Education: National School of Arts of Senegal
- Occupation: Jazz pianist

Abdoulaye Diabaté (1959 – 16 January 2025) was a Senegalese jazz pianist.

== Biography ==
Born in 1959, Diabaté studied at the National School of Arts of Senegal for 10 years. He developed a passion for jazz and became the leader of the Orchestre National du Sénégal. In 1990, he left Senegal for Europe, leaving the orchestra to his brother, Madou Diabaté. In 2002, he founded the Kora Jazz Trio alongside Djeli Moussa Diawara and Moussa Sissokho, producing three albums and touring across concert venues and jazz clubs. In 2010, Diawara left the trio.

Abdoulaye Diabaté died in Boulogne-Billancourt on 16 January 2025, at the age of 65.

== Discography ==
- Kora jazz trio (2003)
- Part II (2005)
- Part III (2008)
- Part IV (2018)
