= Girl (O'Brien novel) =

2019 novel by Edna O'Brien

- First edition
- Author: Edna O'Brien
- Language: English
- Publisher: Faber & Faber
- Publication date: 3 September 2019
- Media type: Print (Hardback)
- Pages: 240
- ISBN: 9-780-57134116-0

Girl is a 2019 novel by Irish author Edna O'Brien. The book's plot is inspired by the Chibok schoolgirls kidnapping in Nigeria, and is narrated by a fictional victim, Maryam.

== Background ==
O'Brien first conceived of the novel after reading about a girl kidnapped by Boko Haram in a magazine at a doctor's office. and the plot is inspired by the Chibok schoolgirls kidnapping in Nigeria. She travelled to Nigeria twice to do research, which included interviewing "escaped girls, their mothers and sisters, to trauma specialists, doctors and Unicef". She later said that she had tried to create a "kind of mythic story from all this pain and horror".

O'Brien regarded Girl as a continuation of the focus of her career, "to chart and get inside the mind, soul, heart and emotion of girls in some form of restriction, some form of life that isn't easy, but who find a way to literally plough their way through and come out as winners of sort – maybe not getting prizes – but come through their experiences and live to tell the tale. It is a theme I have lived and often cried with".

O'Brien does not type her books, and as with others wrote Girl on loose paper, periodically dictating pages to a typist.

== Plot ==
The narrator, Maryam, a victim of kidnapping, is given as a prize to a Boko Haram soldier Mahmoud, and bears his baby. Her feelings towards him are complex, especially after he tells her that he joined the group to protect his mother. The story describes horrors in great detail, and is tough to read. Maryam escapes with another girl, but upon returning home is punished by her family, but the closing lines give hope.

== Publication ==
Girl was published on 3 September 2019.

In 2020 O'Brien opened the Avignon theatre festival with a reading from the novel, later described by the French ministry as "a moving story about violence against women, one of her lifelong concerns".

== Reception ==
Writing for The Guardian, Alex Clark praised the novel, saying: "Everything that O'Brien does memorably throughout her novels, she does here." Charles Taylor of the Los Angeles Times wrote "...the book is the product of a writer thinking of misogyny as a global force, and what's more a force able to reach the fanatic heights represented by Boko Haram because the misogyny of everyday life gives that fanaticism something in which to take root... Girl is a superb example what fiction is supposed to be: an act of empathetic imagination".

Francine Prose of The New York Times praised the book, saying "Let's give O’Brien credit for her energy and passion, for reminding us that at every moment girls are being abused and exploited with unconscionable cruelty and malice. Let's honor her for the grit that inspired her, a woman in her 80s, to travel to Nigeria to listen to people's stories". She said that it also led her to reading moved to begin Beneath the Tamarind Tree, a non-fiction account of the release of some of the Chibok kidnapping victims by CNN reporter Isha Sesay.

Girl was shortlisted for the Prix Femina étranger in France in November 2019, and in that year O'Brien won the Prix Femina spécial for her entire body of work.

Poet Imtiaz Dharker, judge for the 2019 David Cohen Prize, a lifetime achievement award won by O'Brien, said about Girl: "I thought I had the course of O'Brien's work mapped out before the judging came around, and then, towards the end of the process, another great tome dropped through the letterbox, changing the whole terrain".

O'Brien said in a 2020 interview that she had been disappointed by the novel's poor reception in the US, although it was well-received in France and Germany.
