= Jalloh =

Jalloh is a surname which is a variant of the Fula name Diallo. Notable people with the surname include:

- Abubakarr Jalloh, Sierra Leonean politician
- Adama Jalloh (born 1993), British photographer
- Alimamy Jalloh (born 1987), Sierra Leonean professional footballer
- Amadu Jalloh, Sierra Leonean politician
- David Jalloh (born 2012), Sierra Leonean and Tanzanian basketball player
- Mamadou Jalloh (born 2006), Danish-born Sierra Leonean footballer
- Mariama Jalloh (born 1986), singer-songwriter of Sierra Leonian birth who lives in Cologne, Germany
- Mohamed A. Jalloh, Sierra Leonean politician
- Oury Jalloh (born 1968), Sierra Leonean asylum seeker who died in Germany - see Death of Oury Jalloh
- Yayah Jalloh (born 1981), Sierra Leonean international footballer

== See also ==
- Diallo
- Djaló
- Jallow
