= Jarawa language =

Jarawa language may refer to:

- Jarawa language (Andaman Islands), an Ongan (Andamanese) language of the tribal Jarawa people of the Andaman Islands in India
- Jarawa-Onge languages or Ongan languages, a subfamily of languages within the Andamanese group
- Jarawa language (Nigeria), a Bantu language of Nigeria

== See also ==
- Jarawa people (disambiguation)
- Jarawa (disambiguation)
