= Mamadou M'Bodje =

Malian politician

Mamadou M'Bodje (19 July 1910 in Diaby, Mali – 2 September 1958 in Bamako) was a Malian politician who was elected to the French Senate in 1947.
