= Jawara =

Jawara is the English transcription of a surname of Manding origin (the French transcription is Diawara). Notable people with the name include:

== People ==
- Augusta Jawara (1924-1981), Gambian nurse, playwright and activist for women's rights
- Bomba Jawara, Sierra Leonean politician
- Dawda Jawara (1924-2019), prime minister and president of Gambia
- Jali Musa Jawara (aka Djeli Moussa Diawara; born 1962), Guinean musician
- Fatim Jawara, Gambia footballer
- Karamo Jawara (born 1991), Norwegian basketball player

== Arts and entertainment ==
- Jawara (TV series), a 2016 Indonesian soap opera television series

== See also ==
- Diawara (disambiguation)
- Jarawa
