= Ceesay =

Ceesay is a common Gambian surname of Mandinka origin. As well as the family name Touray, it originally indicated the descent of its bearer from a Marabout, a West African Muslim teacher.

Notable people with the name Ceesay include:

- Ali Ceesay (born 1992), Gambian footballer
- Assan Ceesay (born 1994), Gambian footballer
- Babou Ceesay (born 1979), English actor
- Hassoum Ceesay(born 1971), Gambian historian
- Isatou Ceesay (born 1972), Gambian recylcing activist
- Jatto Ceesay (born 1974), former Gambian footballer
- Jesper Ceesay (born 2003), Gambian footballer
- Kebba Ceesay (born 1987), Gambian footballer
- Madi Ceesay (born 19??), Gambian journalist
- Momodou Ceesay (born 1988), Gambian footballer
- Momodou Ceesay (artist) (born 1945), Gambian artist and writer
- Saffie Lowe Ceesay (born 19??), Gambian politician and civil servant
- Yankuba Ceesay (born 1984), Gambian footballer
- Yaya Ceesay (born 1937), Gambian politician and former cabinet minister during the first republic (1965–1994).
