= Beneath the Tamarind Tree =

2019 novel by Isha Sesay

- First edition
- Author: Isha Sesay
- Language: English
- Subject: 2014 Chibok schoolgirls kidnapping/Boko Haram insurgency
- Genre: Non-fiction
- Publisher: HarperCollins
- Publication date: 7 September 2019
- Publication place: Nigeria
- Pages: 382(first edition)
- ISBN: 978-0062686671

Beneath the Tamarind Tree styled as Beneath the Tamarind Tree — A Story of Courage, Family, and the Lost Schoolgirls of Boko Haram is a 2019 non-fiction social novel by Isha Sesay. The novel was written when Sesay was a journalist at CNN International. It gave the details about the 2014 Chibok schoolgirls kidnapping by Boko Haram.

== See also ==
- Girl (2019), a fictional account of one of the Chibok victims by Edna O'Brien
