= Jarawa people =

Jarawa people may refer to:

- Jarawa (Andaman Islands), a tribal people of the Andaman Islands of India
- Jarawa (Berber), a Berber tribe

== See also ==
- Jarawa language (disambiguation)
- Jarawa (disambiguation)
