= Jallow =

Jallow is an English transcription of the surname of Fula origin, Diallo. Notable people with the surname include:

- Antouman Jallow (born 1981), Gambian/Swedish professional footballer
- Chernow Jallow QC (born 1962), former Attorney General of the British Virgin Islands
- Haddy Jallow (born 1985), Gambian-Swedish non-professional actress
- Hassan Bubacar Jallow (born 1950), Gambian lawyer, politician, and jurist
- Lamin Jallow (born 1994), Gambian footballer
- Momodou Lamin Jallow (born 1995) Gambian-British rapper and singer better known as J Hus
- Momodou Malcolm Jallow (born 1975), Gambian-born Swedish politician
- Ousman Jallow (born 1988), Gambian football striker
- Pierre Jallow (born 1979), Gambian basketball player

== See also ==
- Jalloh, another English transcription of the surname
- Diallo, a French transcription
- Djaló, a Portuguese and Creole transcription
