= Dabola =

- Town and sub-prefecture
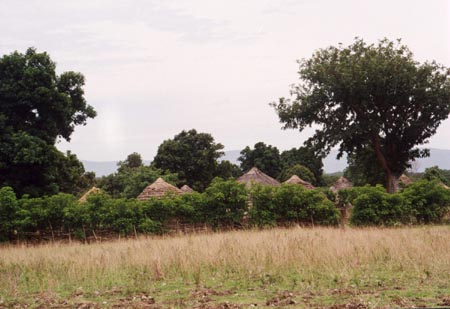

- Location in Guinea
- Coordinates: 10°45′N 11°07′W
- Country: Guinea
- Region: Faranah Region
- Prefecture: Dabola Prefecture
- Elevation: 363 m (1,191 ft)

Population (2014 census)
  - Total: 38,617

Dabola (N’ko: ߘߊߓߏߟߊ߫) is a town in central Guinea. As of 2014 it had a population of 38,617 people. It grew around the railway line from Conakry to Kankan and is known for the Tinkisso Falls and for its important dam.

== Transport ==
While the main line is metre gauge, the branch to Tougué is standard gauge.

== Mining ==
Development of iron ore deposits was proposed in 1994. This would require upgrading of the understrength line from the port of Conakry or a new heavy duty line to a new port at Matakan. There are also deposits of bauxite.

== Notable people ==
- Djely Karifa
- Moustapha Diané

== See also ==
- Transport in Guinea
- Railway stations in Guinea
