= Yasimika =

Studio album by Djeli Moussa Diawara
- Released: 1983
- Genre: Mande
- Length: 33:14
- Labels: A.S Records (Abidjan); Tangent (FR); Go Records (UK); Oval (UK); Hannibal Records (USA)

Djeli Moussa Diawara chronology
Yasimika (1983)	Soubindoor (1988)

Professional ratings
Review scores
Source	Rating
Allmusic	4.5/5 stars
Robert Christgau	(A−)

Yasimika is the first studio album by Djeli Moussa Diawara (aka Jali Musa Jawara), Guinean Kora player (Korafola), released in 1983.

== Background ==
Djeli Moussa Diawara recorded his first LP, now known as Yasimika, in Abidjan in 1982. He was 20 years old and came to the city following his half-brother Mory Kante. This album is still nowadays considered a great piece of African music, and many music lovers consider it changed their appreciation of traditional music, specifically the second track (Haidara), that would appear on many compilations, like The Rough Guide To The Music Of Mali & Guinea released by World Music Network in 2000. During the 80s, Mande pop was starting to lose its folk origins and was becoming a kind of dance music, even topping the European charts. At the same time, a kind of roots revival occurred, led by Djeli Moussa, already an accomplished acoustic singer and Kora player, with the release of this acclaimed album.

Charlie Gillett told the following story in January 2009:

Under the French spelling of his name, the Guinean kora player Djeli Musa Diawara recorded his debut album in 1982 in Abidjan, Ivory Coast, where he had been playing in restaurants. Released on Tangent, a label run by an American in Paris, the album inspired me to dip my toe into this new music by releasing it in the UK on my Oval label, with Anglicised spelling of his name as suggested by Lucy Duran – Jali Musa Jawara. Billy Bragg’s enthusiasm led to his Go Discs label boss Andy McDonald licensing the album for release under the title Direct from West Africa, while World Circuit’s boss Anne Hunt brought Jali Musa to play on two double bills in London with the Malian guitarist (and Andy Kershaw favourite), Ali Farka Toure. Amusingly (to all except those who had to deal with the problem), neither Jali Musa nor Ali had heard of each other, and each assumed he should be top of the bill. Fortunately, as there were two concerts, the bills could be reversed. Both artists recorded new albums for World Circuit while they were in the UK, but only Ali sold enough records to justify making more albums. Meanwhile the original Jali Musa album was issued yet again, this time on Joe Boyd’s Hannibal label, but that license lapsed long ago, and at the moment the album is scandalously unavailable. "Haidara" was included in Ian Anderson’s excellent compilation for Nascente, Routes: 20 years of Essential Folk, Root and World Music.

— Charlie Gillett, World of Music,

== Quotes ==
(...) the flowing grace of Jali Musa Jawara's classic "Haidara". (...)

== Releases, reissues and remastering ==
Yasimika cover (CD - 1991)

This album was released under various names and record labels, with the artist being either referenced as Djeli Moussa Diawara or Jali Musa Jawara.

- 1983 : LP - no title - A.S. Records (Côte d'Ivoire) - ref. AS016
- 1983 : LP - no title - Tangent Records (UK) - ref. TAN7002
- 1983 : LP - "Direct From West Africa" - Go Records (UK) - ref. GGLP1
- 1986 : LP - unknown title - Oval (UK) - ref. OVLP51
- 1991 : CD - "Yasimika" - Hannibal (USA) - ref HNCD1355

The original masters were sold in March 2010 to CybearSonic, a new French label. On 10/01/2010, the fully restored and remastered version was released on digital platforms as "Yasimika (Abidjan 1982)".

== Track listing ==
All lyrics are written by Djeli Moussa Diawara.

Side one
No.	Title	Length
1.	"Foté Mogoban"	6:32
2.	"Haidara"	10:54

Side two
No.	Title	Length
1.	"Yekeke"	7:46
2.	"Yasimika"	8:04

== Personnel ==
- Djeli Moussa Diawara – vocals, Kora
- Kissiman – guitar
- Lamine Kouyate – guitar
- Kouyate Djelimoridjan – Balafon
- Djanka Diabate, Fanta Kouyate & Djenin Doumbia – chorus
