= Koroma =

Koroma is a common surname among the Mende, Temne, Limba, Kuranko and Loko people of Sierra Leone. The word Koroma originates from the Hassaniya Arabic word كوروما, kurumana. People with the surname Koroma are predominantly Muslim. Notable people with the name include:

- Abdul Koroma, former Sierra Leonean judge at the International Court of Justice
- Abdul Karim Koroma, Sierra Leonean politician
- Alimamy Koroma, Sierra Leone's minister of trade and industry
- Brima Koroma, Sierra Leonean footballer
- Ernest Bai Koroma, president of Sierra Leone from 2007 until 2018
- Francis Koroma, former Sierra Leonean footballer
- Johnny Paul Koroma, Sierra Leonean Head of State 1997-1998
- Josh Koroma, English footballer
- Momodu Koroma, Sierra Leone's foreign minister from 2002-2007
- Sorie Ibrahim Koroma, former Vice President of Sierra Leone
- Tejan Koroma, American football player
