= Kadi Sesay =

Sierra Leonean politician

Deputy Chairperson of the Sierra Leone People's Party
- Incumbent
- Assumed office 2007

Sierra Leone Minister of Trade and Industry
- In office 2002–2007
- Preceded by: Osman Kamara
- Succeeded by: Alimamy Koroma

Sierra Leone Minister of Development and Economic Planning
- In office 1999–2002
- Preceded by: James Jonah
- Succeeded by: Mohamed B. Daramy

Personal details
- Born: 4 March 1949 (age 77) Rotifunk, Moyamba District, British Sierra Leone
- Died: 15 June 2025 (aged 75–76) USA
- Party: Sierra Leone People's Party (SLPP)
- Relations: Isha Sesay (daughter)
- Children: two children
- Education: Fourah Bay College: University of Sheffield; University of London
- Profession: Lecturer, University professor

Kadi Sesay (4 March 1949 - 2025) was a Sierra Leonean politician, feminist, pro-democracy advocate and the vice presidential candidate of the Sierra Leone People's Party (SLPP). She served as Sierra Leone Minister of Trade and Industry from 2002 to 2007. She was the founder and Managing Director of Leone Consulting & Advisory Services – for Trade, Investment and Development. She is the mother of CNN International news anchor Isha Sesay.

== Early life and academic career ==
Kadi Sesay was born on 4 March 1949 in Rotifunk, Moyamba District, in Southern Sierra Leone, then a British Crown Colony, to parents from the Temne ethnic group from rural chieftaincy town of Rhombe, Lokomasama Chiefdom, Port Loko District in the Northern Province of Sierra Leone. She received her primary education from the EUB Primary School in Rotifunk, Moyamba District.

Sesay graduated from Fourah Bay College in Freetown in 1973 with a BA (Hons) degree in English Language and Literature. In 1974, she earned an MA degree in African literature at the University of Sheffield in the United Kingdom and took her PhD degree in Applied Linguistics at the University of London.

== Political career ==
Sesay was a lecturer at Fourah Bay College for 20 years and became Head of the English Department. She spent 6 years as chairperson of the National Commission for Democracy and Human Rights (NCDHR). She was the first woman in Sierra Leonean history to head a national commission. She left this post to serve as Minister of Development and Economic Planning which she did for 3 years. She was the Presidential running mate to Rtd. Brigadier Gen. Julius Madda Bio for the 2012 General Elections. Sesay was the first woman to run for the office of vice-president in the history of Sierra Leone.

== Feminism ==
Sesay championed local campaigns for more women to participate in politics. She was the running mate of the opposition party for the 2012 General Elections.

== Private life ==
Sesay was a widow and the mother of two adult children; son Mamud and daughter Iesha. She lived in Freetown and was hailed in the local media as "one of the most beautiful women Sierra Leone ever produced". She was the mother of former CNN International news anchor Isha Sesay.

She died 15 June 2025 after a prolonged illness.
