= Tinkisso Falls =

Waterfall in Guinea

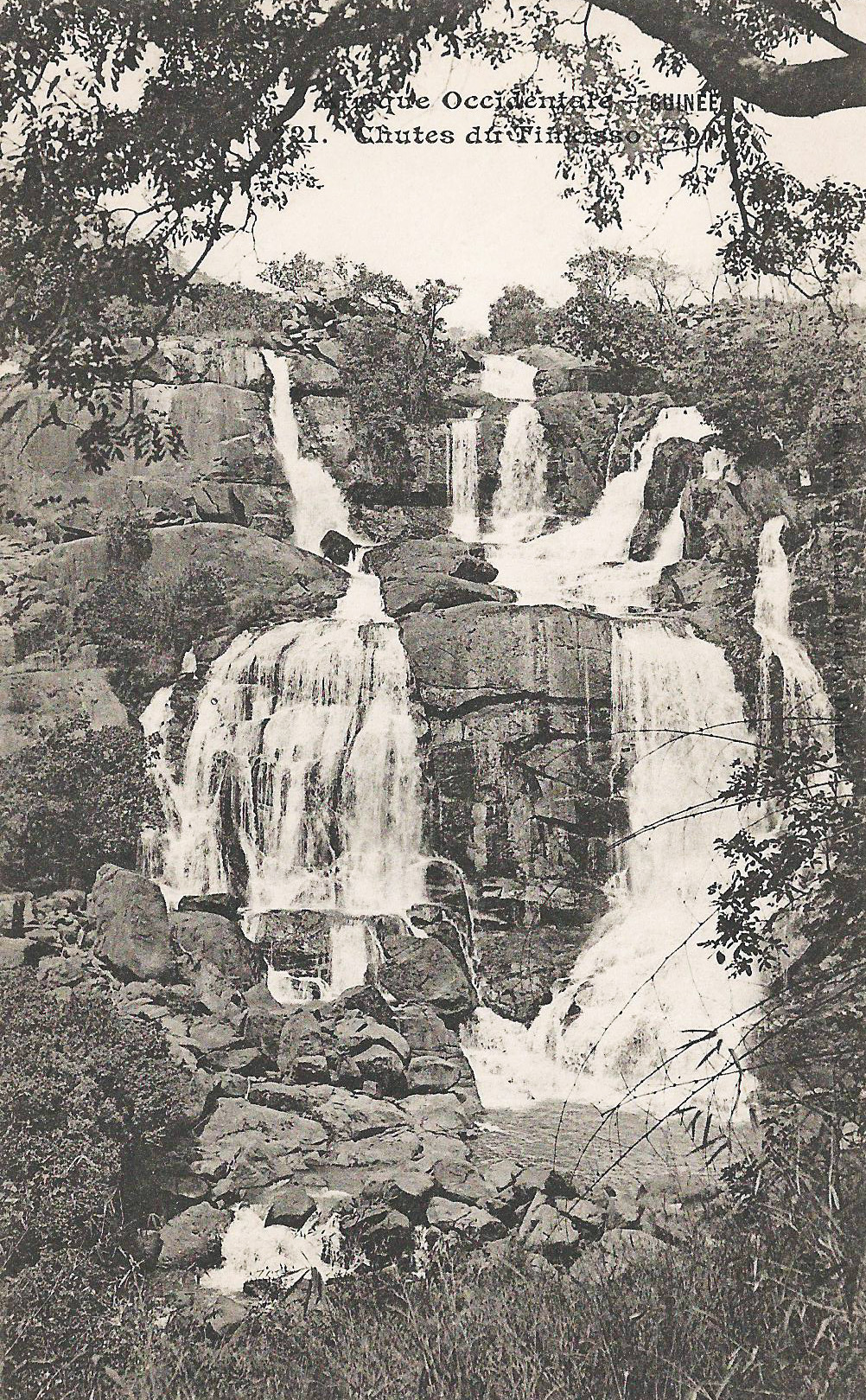
- Tinkisso Falls in 1905

- Location within Guinea
- Location: near Dabola, Guinea
- Coordinates: 10°43′45″N 11°10′12″W

Tinkisso Falls is a waterfall on the Tinkisso River located near Dabola in central Guinea. The falls are 70 m (230 ft) wide and 45 m (148 ft) high. The flow is highest during the rainy season, when the river flows close to ten times as strongly as in the dry season.

== See also ==
- List of waterfalls
