= Djely Karifa =

Guinean activist

Djely Karifa is a Guinean human rights activist. Born in Dabola into an affluent family, he has been Guinean secretary general of CAPSDH, President of the African Peace Academy ACAP based in Algiers and also of Coordination of African Human Rights NGOs in Geneva, his current place of residence.
