= Kora Jazz Trio =

African musical group

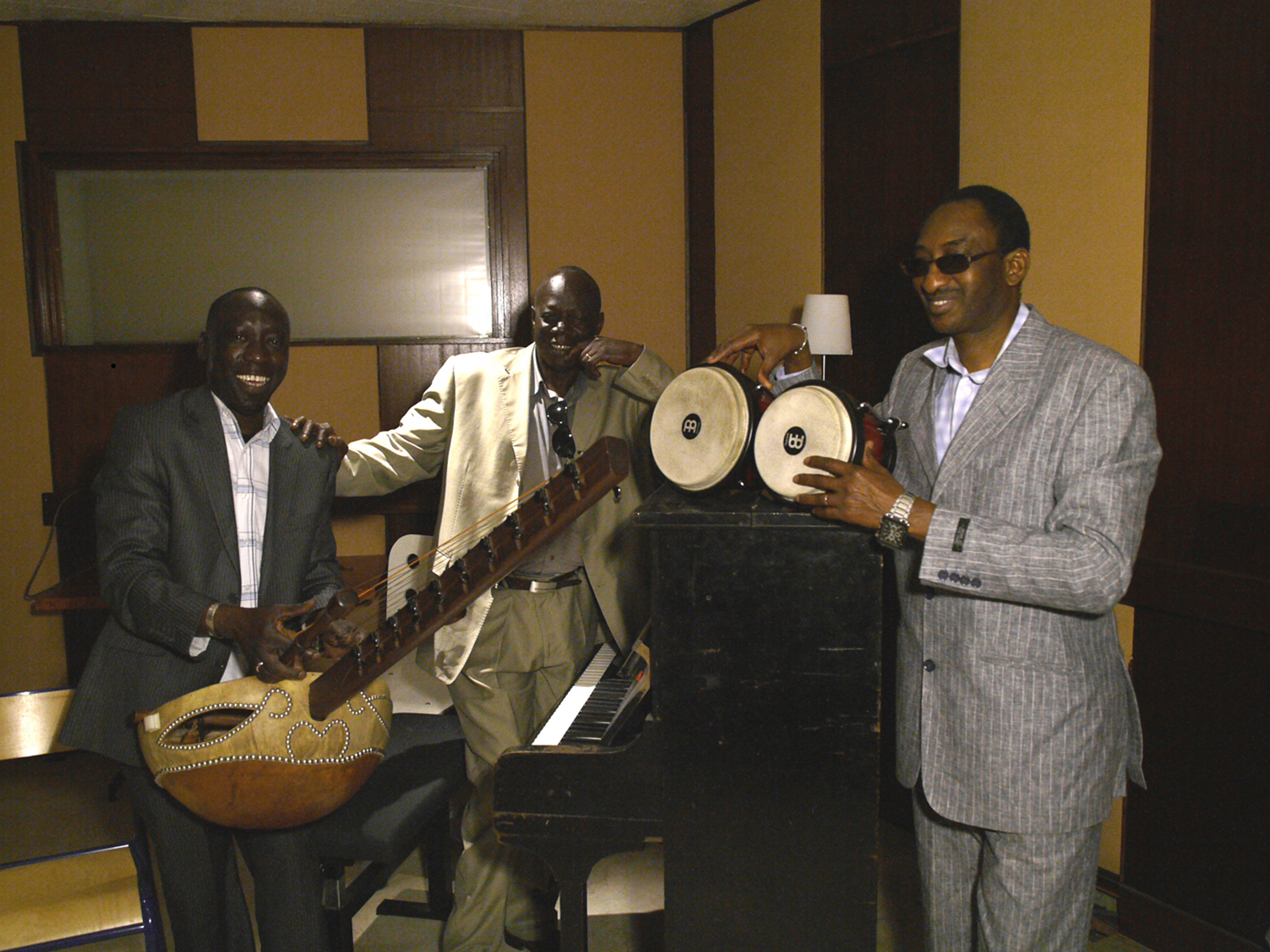

Background information
- Origin: Guinea; Senegal
- Genres: Jazz, Mandingo
- Years active: 2002-2010
- Members: Djeli Moussa Diawara; Abdoulaye Diabaté; Moussa Sissokho

Kora Jazz Trio is a three piece African musical group, founded in 2002 by Djeli Moussa Diawara, Guinean Korafola, with Abdoulaye Diabate and Moussa Sissokho, best known for producing a music that is a mix of American jazz with traditional African music. Described as "the encounter between mandinga musical tradition and the freedom of jazz, between West African percussion and Afro-American swing", they have been recognized for their focus on sharing their cultural heritage, without doing so for the sake of mainstream success or in an effort to create a movement.

After three albums, Djeli Moussa Diawara left the band to focus on personal projects and was replaced by Soriba Kouyaté. The Kora Jazz Trio was replaced by the Kora Jazz Band in 2010, and the release of the album "Kora Jazz Band & Guests".
In 2018 a new album was released, Part IV, with Chérif Soumano replacing Kouyaté on kora, plus guests Manuel Marchès (double bass), Adama Conde (balafon), Boris Caicedo (percussion), Woz Kaly (vocals) and Hervé Morisot (guitar).

== Original members ==
- Djeli Moussa Diawara - vocals, guitar, kora
- Abdoulaye Diabaté - piano
- Moussa Sissokho - percussion

Both Diabaté and Sissokho are from Senegal.

== Discography ==
- Part I (2003)
- Part II (2005)
- Part III (2008)
- Part IV (2018)
