= Jarawa =

Jarawa may refer to:

- Jarawas (Andaman Islands), one of the indigenous peoples of the Andaman Islands
  - Jarawa language (Andaman Islands)
- Jarawa (Berber tribe), a Berber tribal confederacy that flourished in northwest Africa during the seventh century
- Jarawa (Nigeria), an ethnic group in Plateau State, Nigeria
  - Jarawa language (Nigeria), a Bantoid language of Nigeria

== See also ==
- Jarawa people (disambiguation)
- Jarawa language (disambiguation)
- Jarawa-Onge languages or Ongan languages, a subfamily of languages within the Andamanese group
- Jarawan languages, a dialect cluster that is closely related to, or perhaps a branch of, the Bantu languages
- Jawara, a surname
- Jarwa, a village in Uttar Pradesh, India
- INS Jarawa, a naval base in the Andaman Islands, India
