= Inna Sissoko Cissé =

Malian politician

Moussoumakan "Inna" Sissoko Cissé, (née Sissoko, December 11, 1933 in Macina, Mali), is a Malian politician, nurse, and social worker who served as Secretary of State for Social Affairs (secrétaire d’Etat aux Affaires sociales) from 1968 to 1972. She was the first woman to be a member of Mali's government.

== Biography ==
Inna Sissoko was born into a family of teachers. She went to school in Ségou and Bamako. In 1953, she began working as an assistant teacher. She then studied nursing from 1957 to 1959 in Dakar. In 1959, she moved to Paris and worked as a social worker until 1962, then became a teacher of social work. She attended the University of Paris and graduated in 1967 with a degree in social sciences.

Although Sissoko did not belong to the governing party, Sudanese Union – African Democratic Rally, she was selected as Secretary of State for Social Affairs after the 1968 Malian coup d'état, making her Mali's first female member of government. She held this position until 1972, when the management of social affairs was taken over by the Ministry of Health. Beginning in 1985, she worked as an advisor for the Ministry of Labour and Civil Service (ministère du Travail et de la Fonction publique).

In 1971, she launched Mali's first campaign for sex education and family planning. As a result, Moussa Traoré's military government ended the colonial-era ban on contraception; Mali was the first Francophone country in Africa to take this measure. Sissoko was an advocate of women's organizations, and supported the founding of the National Association of Malian Women (l'Association nationale des femmes du Mali) in 1974.

Inna Sissoko is a Muslim. She is divorced from professor Django Cissé. She has adopted children. Sissoko was the first woman named a Grand Officer of the National Order of Mali.
