= Khadidiatou Diallo =

Senegalese advocate

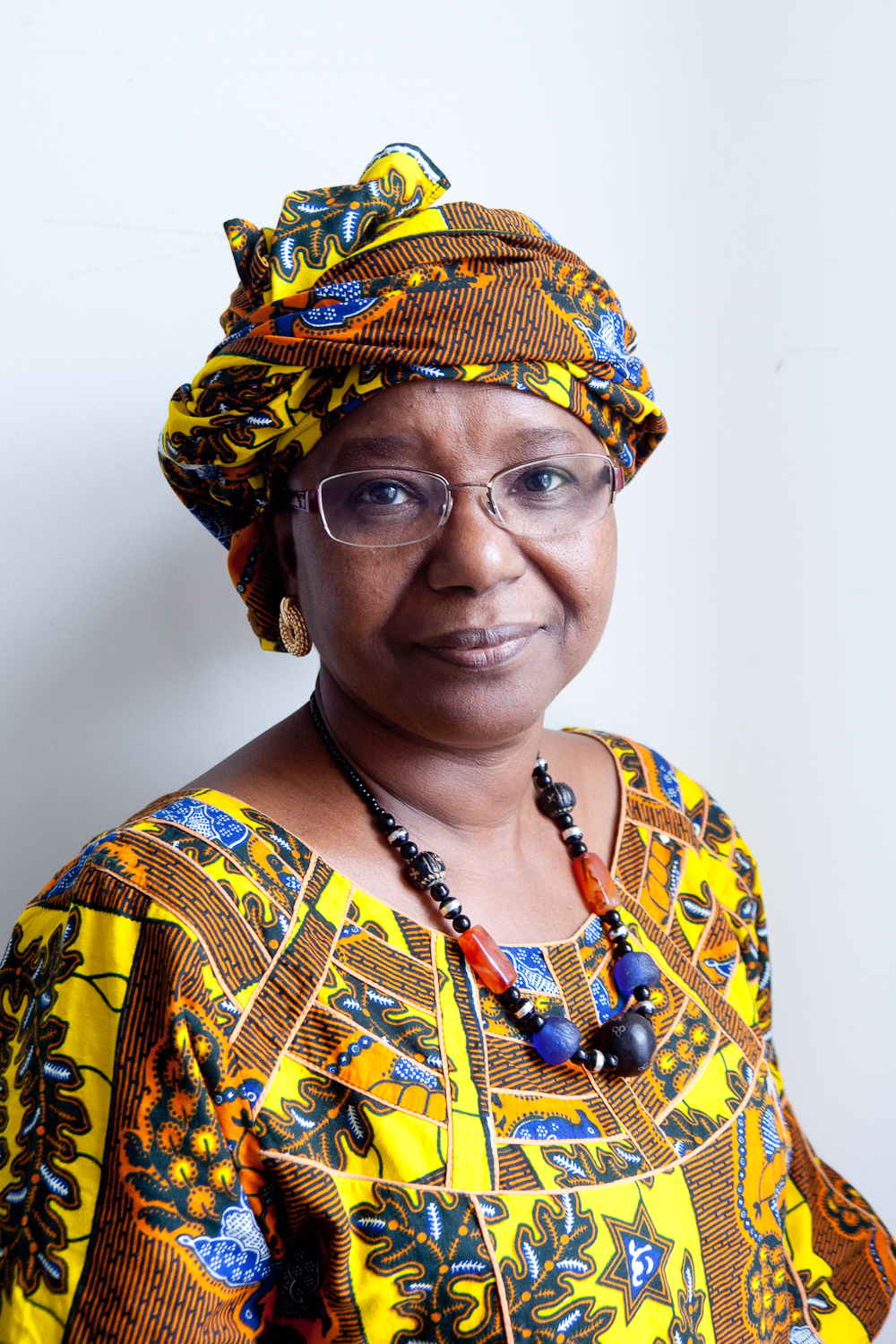
- Diallo in 2016
- Born: Senegal
- Occupation: Advocate against female genital mutilation
- Organization: Groupe de femmes pour l'Abolition des Mutilations Sexuelles
- Website: gams.be

Khadidiatou Diallo (born in Senegal) is a Senegalese advocate and the founder of the Groupe de femmes pour l'Abolition des Mutilations Sexuelles (GAMS) in Belgium.

== Biography ==
Diallo underwent excision at the age of seven. At 12, she was married without her consent to a man 33 years older than her.

She arrived in Belgium in the 1980s. At 24, she learned how to read and write, and began writing her life story. Writing was an emotional outlet for her to help overcome her traumatic past.

To fight against excision and female genital mutilation, Khadidiatou Diallo founded the Groupe de femmes pour l'Abolition des Mutilations Sexuelles (GAMS) in 1996.

== Awards ==
In 2005, she was awarded the "Prix femme de l'année Marie Popelin" from the Conseil des femmes francophones de Belgique.

== Publications ==
- Khadidiatou Diallo, Mon destin entre les mains de mon père, Bruxels, Ed. Collectif Alpha, 2016
