= Youssouf Diallo =

Guinean footballer

Personal information
- Date of birth: 4 April 1984 (age 42)
- Place of birth: Conakry
- Position: Midfielder

Youssouf Diallo (born 4 April 1984 in Conakry) is a Guinean football midfielder.

Diallo played two seasons in the Segunda División with Racing de Ferrol, making his league debut on 28 August 2004.

== Clubs ==
- 2003-04 : (Netherlands) RKC Waalwijk
- 2004-07 : (Spain) Racing de Ferrol
- 2004-04 : (Spain) O Val (loan)
- 2007-08 : (Spain) La Soledad
- 2008-09 : (Spain) UD Villa de Santa Brígida
- 2009- : (Spain) SD Tenisca
