= Mohamed Cissé =

Guinean footballer

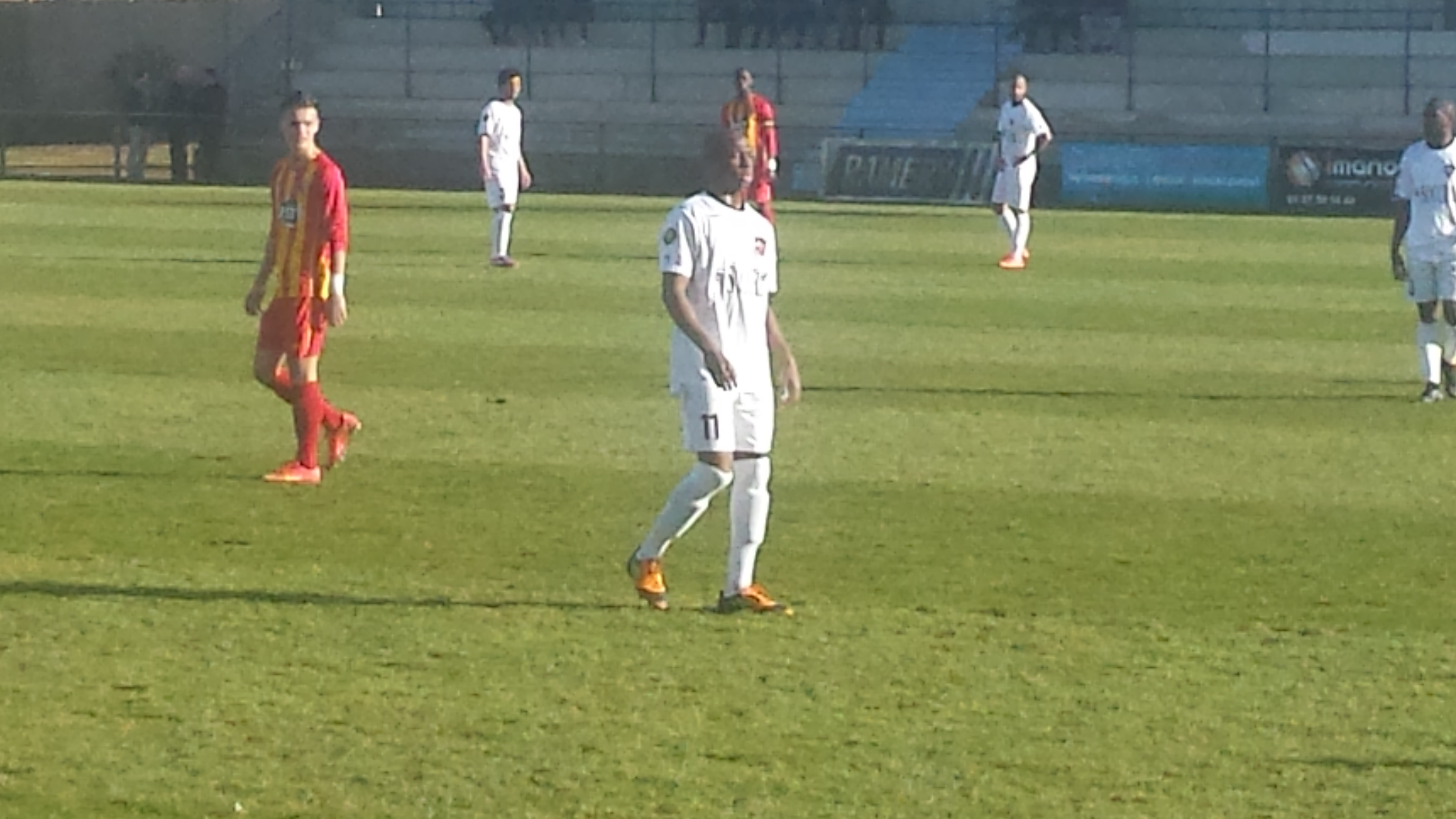

Personal information
- Full name: Mohamed Lamine Cisse
- Date of birth: 10 February 1982 (age 44)
- Place of birth: Conakry
- Height: 1.79 m (5 ft 10 in)
- Position: Defender

Team information
- Current team: SK Lokeren-Doorslaar

Senior career*
Years	Team	Apps	(Gls)
1999–2003	Horoya AC		
2003–2007	Royal Antwerp F.C.		
2007–2008	Bursaspor		
2009–2012	KRC Mechelen		
2012–2013	RFC Tournai		
2015–2016	KVV Laarne-Kalken		
2016–2019	Sparta Waasmunster		
2019–	SK Lokeren-Doorslaar		

International career^{‡}
1999–2008	Guinea MNT	11	(2)
- * Club domestic league appearances and goals as of 19:30, 20 March 2023 (UTC) ‡ National team caps and goals as of 19:30, 20 March 2023 (UTC)

Mohamed Cisse (born 10 February 1982) is a Guinean footballer who currently plays for SK Lokeren-Doorslaar in Belgium, as a central defender.

After starting his football career with Horoya AC, Cisse made his professional debuts in 2003, with Belgium's Royal Antwerp FC. In the 2007 summer transfer window, he signed for Turkish side Bursaspor, being almost unheard of over the course of one season - the team could only rank in 13th position - and being released.
