= Moussa Coulibaly =

Moussa Coulibaly may refer to:

- Moussa Coulibaly (footballer born 1981), Malian football player for Libyan Premier League club Darnes
- Moussa Coulibaly (footballer born 1993), Iranian football defender of Malian descent
- Moussa Coulibaly (Islamic militant), perpetrator of the 2015 Nice stabbing attack
