= Koulibaly =

Koulibaly is a surname. Notable people with the surname include:

- Abdulai Koulibaly (born 1995), Liberian footballer
- Kalidou Koulibaly (born 1991), French/Senegalese footballer
- Mamadou Koulibaly (born 1957), Ivorian politician
- Paul Koulibaly (born 1986), Burkinabé footballer
- Pierre Koulibaly (born 1986), Burkinabé footballer

== See also ==
- Coulibaly
