= Momodou Ceesay (artist) =

Gambian visual artist and author (born 1945)

- Born: 1945 (age 79–80); Banjul, Gambia
- Other names: Momadou Ceesay
- Education: Wesleyan University; University of Poitiers; La Sorbonne
- Occupation(s): Visual artist, writer
- Known for: Painting, printmaking

Momodou Ceesay (born 1945) is a Gambian visual artist and author.

== Early life ==
Momodou Ceesay was born in 1945, in Banjul, Gambia. Ceesay's early education was in Banjul, followed by scholarships and academic studies at Suffield Academy and Wesleyan University, Connecticut (USA). In 1970, he received a bachelor's degree with majors in languages and literature. He continued his studies in France at the University of Poitiers and La Sorbonne. For his studies of the French language, Ceesay received diplomas from each of these universities.

== Career ==
After graduation, Ceesay decided to become an artist. Essentially self-taught, he creates acrylics, watercolors, and serigraphs. In his printmaking, Momodou produces small editions by hand, without a mechanized studio. One of his earlier serigraphs entitled "Evening Works" was selected by UNICEF as one of their 1976 designs.

== Exhibitions ==
Solo exhibitions

- Goethe Institute, Lagos, Nigeria
- La Gruta Galeria, Bogota, Colombia
- National Museum of History, Teipei, Taiwan
- Theatre National Sorano, Dakar, Senegal
- University of Massachusetts Library, Boston
- Galerija Likovnih Samorastnikov, Trebnje, Slovenia
- Ille-lfe Museum, Philadelphia, Pennsylvania

Group exhibitions

- Gallery of Art, Howard University, Washington, D.C.
- Canterbury Museum, Christchurch, New Zealand
- Studio Museum in Harlem, New York City, New York
- ISC Art Gallery, UCLA, Los Angeles, California
- International Biennial of Color Graphics, Switzerland
- Museum of African American Art, Los Angeles, California
- Golden State Mutual Insurance Company, Los Angeles, California
- National Center for Afro-American Artists, Boston
- "Africa Now!", World Bank, Washington, D.C. (2007–09)
- "Voices of Courage", Freedom To Create Prize Exhibition (2010)
- Mojo Gallery, Dubai (2011): "As It Is! Contemporary Art from Africa & the Diaspora"

== Bibliography ==
Books and articles about Momodou Ceesay

- Donahue, Benedict. "The Cultural Arts of Africa", Washington, D.C.: University Press of America, 1979. See page 167.
- Fosu, Kojo. "20th Century Art of Africa", Zaria: Gasklya Corporation, 1986. Illus. See pp. 155–156. (Addit.Ref: Contemporary African Art, 1977)
- Gardella, David. "Momodou Ceesay of the Gambia", African Arts (Los Angeles) 7(4): 40–41, Summer 1974. illus.
- "Massachusetts: African Contemporary Art"; [exhibition, Gallery of Art, Howard University, Washington, D.C., 30 April – 31 July 1977]. Washington, D.C.: The Gallery, 1977. [31]pp. illus.
- Harper, Mary. "A Distinctive Style", [review of Exhibition of Gambian artist Momodou Ceesay at Safari Afro-Gallery, London (1989)]. West Africa (London) no. 3755: 1314, 7–13 August, 198. illus.
- Kennedy, Jean. "New Currents, Ancient Rivers: Contemporary African Artists in a Generation of Change". Washington, D.C.: Smithsonian Institution Press, 1992. illus. See p. 94.
