= Loubo Augustin Djessou =

Ivorian politician

Loubo Augustin Djessou (born 1917 in Soubre, Côte d'Ivoire; died 29 November 1986) was a politician from Côte d'Ivoire who served in the French Senate from 1955 to 1958.
