= Massata Cissé =

Burkinabé female truck driver

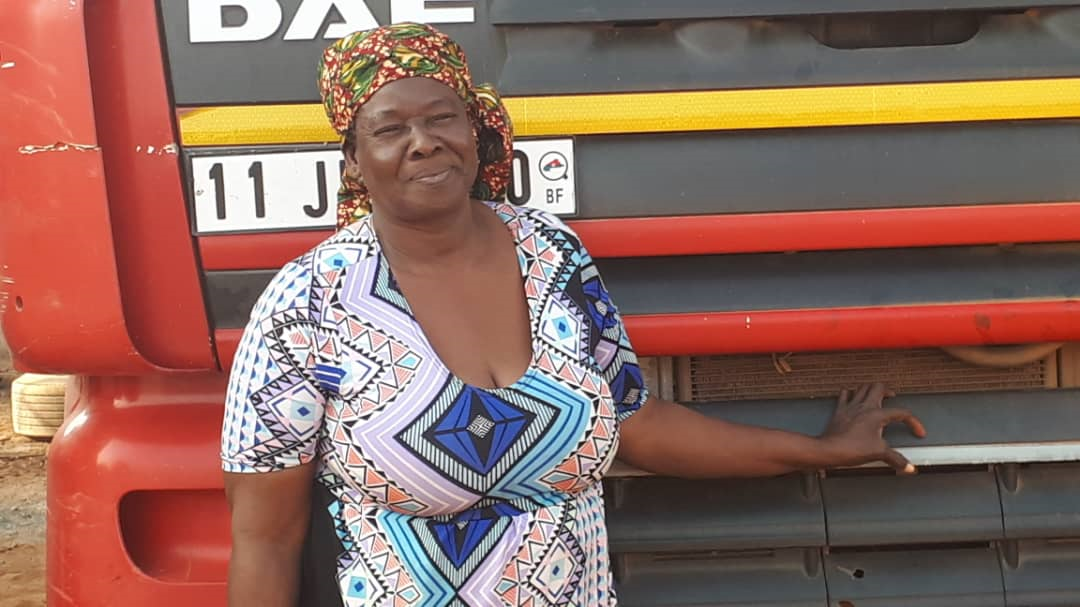
Cissé in 2020

Massata Cissé (alternatively spelled Maïssata; born 1961), nicknamed Mama Afrika (for the various countries on the African continent she has visited) is a woman from Burkina Faso, notable for being the first female truck driver in West Africa, driving since 1981. She gained media attention in the late 2010s and early 2020s in french-language news outlets and currently works for a logistics company named Kanis Logistic.

Cissé is considered a pioneer and advocate for woman's rights, especially in the muslim world and personally thanks her parents for her fighting spirit.

In 2017, she was awarded the Trophée international de la Femme Active d’Afrique (TIFAA).

She has grand-children and a sister, Aminata Cissé.

== Film ==
A documentary about her was announced in 2017 under director Dieudonné Alaka.
