= Moustapha Diané =

Guinean politician

Deputy in the National Assembly, 1st Vice-President of the Commission of Law, General Administration, Justice and Human Rights
- President: Alpha Conde
- Preceded by: Bakary Nabé
- Constituency: Dabola

Personal details
- Born: Dabola, Guinea
- Party: Rally of the Guinean People
- Education: University of Conakry, Université de Genève

Moustapha Diané is a Guinean politician who represents the constituency of Dabola in the National Assembly. He is a member of the Majority Rally of the Guinean People Party of former president Alpha Conde. He is the president of the committee for monitoring the digitalisation work of the Assembly.
