= Micheline Coulibaly =

Ivorian writer (1959–2003)

Micheline Coulibay
- Born: Trabi-Yrie Micheline; 1950; Xuân Lai, State of Vietnam (present-day Vietnam)
- Died: 19 March 2003 (aged 52–53); Houston, Texas, U.S.
- Occupations: Writer, administrator
- Spouse: Lacina Coulibaly
- Children: 3

Micheline Coulibaly (1950 – 19 March 2003) was an Ivorian writer of short stories and children's books.

== Biography ==
Coulibaly's father was Ivorian, while her Vietnamese mother was a widow and businesswoman. They met in Saigon during World War II, where her father was stationed with the French army. Her maternal grandfather was a Mandarin and she was part of the large Tra-Bi family. Coulibaly was born in Xuân Lai, Vietnam and her first language was Vietnamese. The family moved to Ivory Coast in 1956, where she spent nearly 40 years. Coulibaly obtained a degree in public relations, then started working at a computer company in Abidjan in 1974. She was appointed Head of Supplies and Purchasing in 1980. In the early 1990s, she was part of the Association des Écrivains de Côte d'Ivoire. Coulibaly left the Ivory Coast in 1993 after her husband was offered a job in Mexico. She became a stay-at-home mom, which she found difficult at first, but ultimately felt is strengthened family ties. They remained there for six years until June 1999, when her husband accepted a job offer in Dubai. They moved there with their youngest daughter in 2001.

Mé, the main character of Les Larmes de cristal, is based on Coulibaly's mother, who was living with her in Abidjan in the early 1990s. In 1995, she received an honourable mention in the José Martí Foundation's International Competition for Children's Literature.

Coulibaly met her husband Lacina at university. He is Ivorian. The couple had three daughters: Mariame, Sandra, and Kandidia. In 2003, Coulibaly died from illness while visiting her oldest daughter in Houston, United States, where she was studying.

== Publications ==
- Nan la Bossue. Abidja: CEDA. 1988. ISBN 2-86394-157-7.
- Le Prince et La Souris Blanche. Abidja: CEDA. 1988. ISBN 978-286-394-158-4.
- Le Chien, le chat et le tigre. Abidja: CEDA. 1988. ISBN 978-2-86394-156-0.
- Embouteillage. Abidja: Edilis. 1992. ISBN 2-909238-00-8.
- L'Écureuil et Le Cochon. Quebec: Hurtubise. 1994. ISBN 2-89428-037-8.
- Les Confidences de Médor. Abidja: Edilis. 1996. ISBN 2-909238-09-1.
- Les Larmes de cristal. Abidja: Edilis. 2000. ISBN 2-909238-72-5.
- Kaskou l'intrépide. Abidjan: Edilis. 2002. ISBN 2-84487-159-3.
- Kamba la sorcière. Abidjan: Nouvelles Editions Ivoiriennes. 2004. ISBN 2-84487-213-1.
