= Samba Diawara =

Football manager (born 1978)

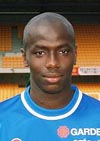
- Diawara during the 2002–03 season

Personal information
- Date of birth: 15 March 1978 (age 48)
- Place of birth: Paris, France
- Height: 1.84 m (6 ft 0 in)
- Position: Defender

Team information
- Current team: Reims (assistant)

Senior career*
Years	Team	Apps	(Gls)
1995–1999	Red Star	58	(0)
1999–2001	Troyes	18	(0)
2001–2002	Istres	24	(1)
2002–2004	Louhans-Cuiseaux	54	(3)
2004–2007	Tubize	86	(4)
2007–2010	Charleroi-Marchienne	89	(4)
2010–2011	Union SG	32	(3)
2011–2014	Tubize	56	(3)
Total		417	(18)

International career
2000–2003	Mali	7	(2)

Managerial career
- 2014: Tubize (assistant)
- 2018–2022: Charleroi (assistant)
- 2022: Anderlecht (assistant)
- 2022: RSCA Futures
- 2022–2025: Reims (assistant)
- 2024: Reims (caretaker)
- 2025: Reims
- 2025–: Reims (assistant)
- * Club domestic league appearances and goals

Samba Diawara (born 15 March 1978) is a former professional footballer who played as a defender. Born in France, he played for the Mali national team. He is an assistant manager at Ligue 2 club Reims.

== Club career ==
Diawara started his career with Parisian club Red Star. He moved to Troyes in 1999 and made his debut against Lyon in August.

== International career ==
Diawara has also played international matches for the Mali national team.

== Personal life ==
He is the brother of the footballers Fousseni and Abdoulaye.

== Honours ==
Reims

- Coupe de France runner-up: 2024–25
