= Diabaté =

Diabaté is a surname. It can be found in Mali, Côte d'Ivoire, France, and Burkina Faso.

Notable people with the surname include:

- Abdoulaye Diabaté (singer) (born 1956), Malian singer and guitarist
- Cheick Diabaté (born 1988), Malian football player
- Cheick Mamadou Diabaté (born 2004), Ivorian footballer
- Cyrille Diabaté (born 1973), French mixed martial arts fighter
- Henriette Diabaté (born 1935), Ivorian politician and writer
- Kélétigui Diabaté (1931–2012), Malian musician
- Lassina Diabaté (born 1974), former Ivorian football player
- Mamadou Diabaté (born 1973), Burkinabé balafon player
- Mamadou Diabaté (born 1975), Malian kora player
- Massa Makan Diabaté (1938–1988), Malian historian, author and playwright
- Mohamoud Diabate (born 2001), American professional football linebacker
- Moussa Diabaté (born 2002), French basketball player
- Sidiki Diabaté, Malian kora player
- Solo Diabate (born 1987), Ivorian basketballer
- Toumani Diabaté (1965 – 2024), Malian kora player
- Zié Diabaté (born 1989), Côte d'Ivoire football defender
