= Djenabou Diallo-Hartmann =

German politician (born 1985)

Member of the Landtag of Lower Saxony
- Incumbent
- Assumed office 8 November 2022

Personal details
- Born: 11 April 1985 (age 41) Conakry, Guinea
- Party: Alliance 90/The Greens (since 2012)

Djenabou Diallo-Hartmann (born 11 April 1985) is a Guinean-born German politician serving as a member of the Landtag of Lower Saxony since 2022. She has served as treasurer of the Alliance 90/The Greens group in the Landtag since 2022.
