= Mohamadou Djibrilla Maïga =

Nigerien politician (1908–1975)

Mohamadou Djibrilla Maïga (July 8, 1908 in Colman Niger – November 23, 1975 in Paris) was a communist politician from Niger who was elected to the French Senate in 1947.
