= Janneh =

Janneh is a surname. Notable people with the surname include:

- Abdoulie Janneh, Gambian diplomat and economist
- Amadou Scattred Janneh (born 1962), Gambian politician
- Gibril B. Semega-Janneh, Gambian judge
- Jocelyn Janneh (born 2002), Sierra Leonean footballer
- Karamba Janneh (born 1989), Gambian footballer
- Saikou Janneh (born 2000), Gambian footballer
