= Diané Mariam Koné =

Malian politician

Diané Mariam Koné (born 26 August 1953 in Ségou) is a Malian politician. She was a Minister of Livestock and Fisheries from December 2012 to September 2013. She was previously Director of the Center for Practical Training in Livestock (1991-1994), Coordinator of the Support Project for the Advancement of Women (1997-2001), and Director of the National Center for Documentation and Information on Women and the Child (2004 to 2010).

She is a biologist, and also studied the Management of Development Projects at the University of Pittsburgh.
