= Maximilien Quenum-Possy-Berry =

Beninese politician

Maximilien Quenum-Possy-Berry, Légion d'honneur (December 5, 1911, in Cotonou, Dahomey, now Benin – October 21, 1988, in Paris) was a politician who served as a senator of the Fourth Republic, representing Dahomey in the French Senate from 1955 to 1958. He was also a teacher of philosophy and a writer on ethnology.

== Personal life ==
He was married to Marie-Antoinette Aubert ( Montélimar ) and had five children with her.

== Writings ==
His book Légendes africaines: Côte d'Ivoire, Soudan, Dahomey (1946) was a collection of historical legends he recalled being told in his childhood by the elders of his village. The book, aimed at children, won an award from the Académie française. Most of his other books were academic ethnological studies; of particular note is his Au Pays du Fons: Us et Coutumes de Dahomey (1938), which was also lauded by the Académie.
