= Lucius-Duquesnes Gustave =

Guadeloupean politician

French Senator for Togo
- In office 23 December 1946 – 18 May 1952

Personal details
- Born: Lucius-Duquesnes Gustave; 24 September 1883 Sainte-Anne, Guadeloupe
- Died: 15 July 1972 (aged 88) Sainte-Anne, Guadeloupe

Lucius-Duquesnes Gustave (24 September 1883 - July 15, 1972) was a politician from Guadeloupe who represented and served Togo in the French Senate from 1946 to 1952.

== Biography ==
In 1917, after graduating from high school, Lucius-Duquesnes Gustave began working in Guadeloupe as an assistant clerk in public works. He earned his degree from the ESTP, began his career as a site supervisor for public works in the French Colonies, and became an engineer in 1933.

Gustave Lucius-Duquesnes became district chief in Basse-Terre, then head of the Guadeloupe department from 1935 to 1939. In 1942, he was appointed head of the industrial production department in Dakar, then deputy director of public works in Togo.

Lucius-Duquesnes Gustave ran for the Council of the Republic in 1946 as a candidate of the French Section of the Workers' International. He was elected to the Senate on December 23, 1946. He served on the Overseas France Committee as a member of the Socialist Group. In 1947, he served as rapporteur for the Production Committee on the proposed law regarding social security for miners. He was also tasked by the France Committee with drafting a report on the protection of submarine cables.

His term ended on May 18, 1952. He then retired from political life.

== Sources ==
- page on the French Senate website
