= Diaby =

Diaby is a surname, and may refer to:

- Cheikh Moustapha Diaby Alias Diaby Koweït (1951-2008), President of the African institutions presidium.

President du conseil supérieur islamique de Côte d’Ivoire [Islamic Affairs-Awqaf]. A former counsel for both presidents - Félix Houphouet Boigny et Henri Konan Bédié. He was also a leading candidate for president of the Ivory Coast in election which were to be scheduled later in 2009. He was also a great humanitarian and family man. He was known for his generosity.

- Abdoulay Diaby (born 1991), Malian football player
- Abou Diaby (born 1986), French football midfielder
- Aboubakar Diaby Ouattara, Ivorian diplomat
- Alassane Diaby (born 1995), French-born Malian football player
- Karamba Diaby (born 1961), Senegalese-born German chemist and politician
- Kariata Diaby (born 1995), Ivorian basketball player
- Karim Coulibaly Diaby (born 1989), French-Ivorian football striker
- Lassina Diaby (born 1992), Ivorian footballer
- Mohamed Diaby (born 1990), Ivorian football midfielder
- Moussa Diaby (born 1999), French football forward
- Oumar Diaby (born 1990), French football forward
- Sékana Diaby (born 1968), former Ivorian football defender
- Souleymane Diaby (born 1987), Ivorian football striker of Guinean descent
- YaYa Diaby (born 1999), American football player
