= Fofana =

Fofana is a surname. Notable persons with that name include:

- Bangaly Fofana (born 1989), French basketball player
- Cédric Fofana (born 2003), Canadian diver
- Datro Fofana (born 2002), Ivorian footballer
- Fodé Fofana (born 2002), Dutch footballer
- Gahité Fofana (born 1965), Guinean film director, producer, editor, actor and screen writer
- Gueïda Fofana (born 1991), French footballer
- Ibrahima Fofana (1952–2010), Guinean trade unionist
- Ibrahima Kalil Fofana (born 1998), Guinean basketball player
- Ibrahima Kassory Fofana (born 1954), Guinean politician
- Malick Fofana (born 2005), Belgian footballer
- Mike Fofana (born 1997), Ivorian basketball player
- Mohamed Fofana (footballer, born March 1985), Malian footballer
- Mohamed Fofana (footballer, born May 1985), French footballer
- Mohamed Fofana (footballer, born October 1985), Guinean footballer
- Moinina Fofana (born 1950), Sierra Leonean general
- Moryké Fofana (born 1991), Ivorian footballer
- Rayan Fofana (born 2006), French footballer
- Seko Fofana (born 1995), French-born Ivorian footballer
- Sékou Fofana (born 1980), Malian footballer
- Tiemoko Fofana (born 1999), Ivorian footballer
- Vafessa Fofana (born 1992), Ivorian basketball player
- Wesley Fofana (rugby union) (born 1988), French rugby union player
- Wesley Fofana (footballer) (born 2000), French footballer
- Yahia Fofana (born 2000), French-born Ivorian footballer
- Youssouf Fofana (Ivorian footballer) (born 1966), Ivorian footballer
- Youssouf Fofana (French footballer) (born 1999), French footballer
