= Nasseneba Touré Diané =

Ivorian politician

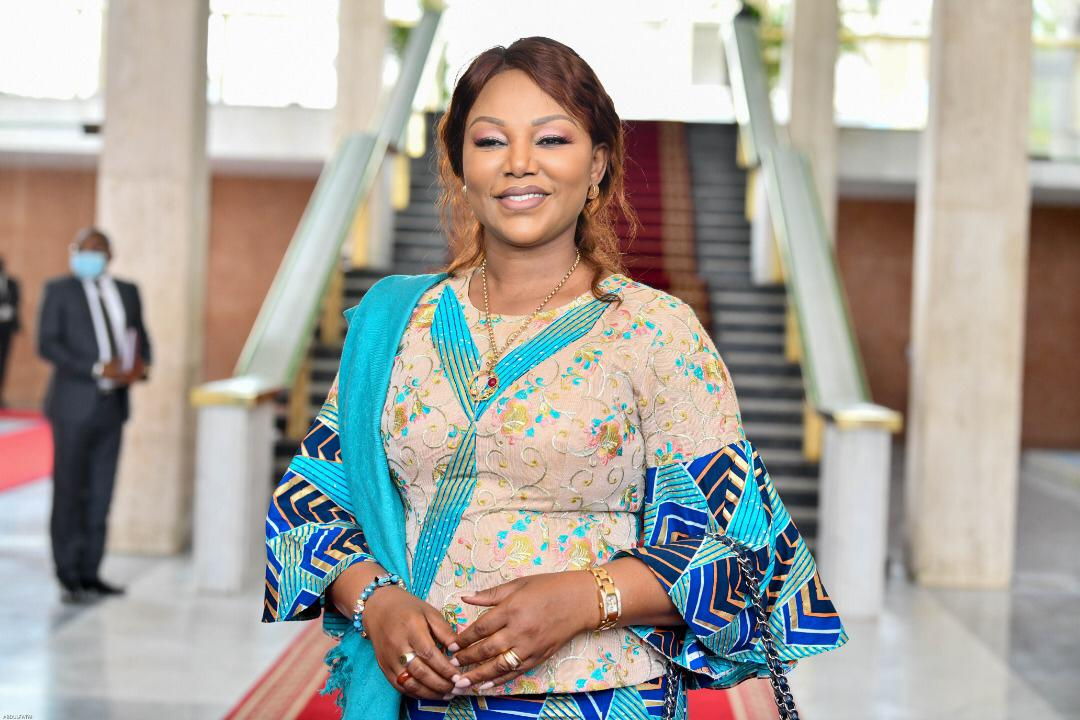
Nasseneba Touré Diané

Nasseneba Touré Diané is an Ivory Coast politician.

Diané was born on 24 September 1972 in Korhogo.

Diané is Minister of Women, Family and Children; mayor of the municipality of Odienné; and member of the Rally of Republicans (RDR).
