= Kadidia Diawara =

Malian footballer (born 1986)

Kadidia Fofana Diawara (born May 16, 1986, in Bamako, Mali) is a Malian football player who plays in France for FC Vendenheim.

== Biography ==
Diawara started her career in Mali with the FC Amazones Boulkassoumbougou, and moved in 2006 to the French women's football club STAPS Strasbourg. She started her professional career in 2008 in Alsace with FC Vendenheim. In February 2012, she was voted best by the French Association among five defensive players in the league. Since 2003, Diawara has played for the Malian national women's football team, and has taken part twice in the African Women's Cup of Nations, in 2006 and 2010.

Since June 2010, Diawara has worked as a trainer for the E-Youth girls on FC Vendenheim. In addition to football, she has studied finance and accounting in Bamako, where she graduated in 2006 with a diploma from the Universitaire de Technologie.
