= Mariam Sy Diawara =

Ivorian-Canadian publicist

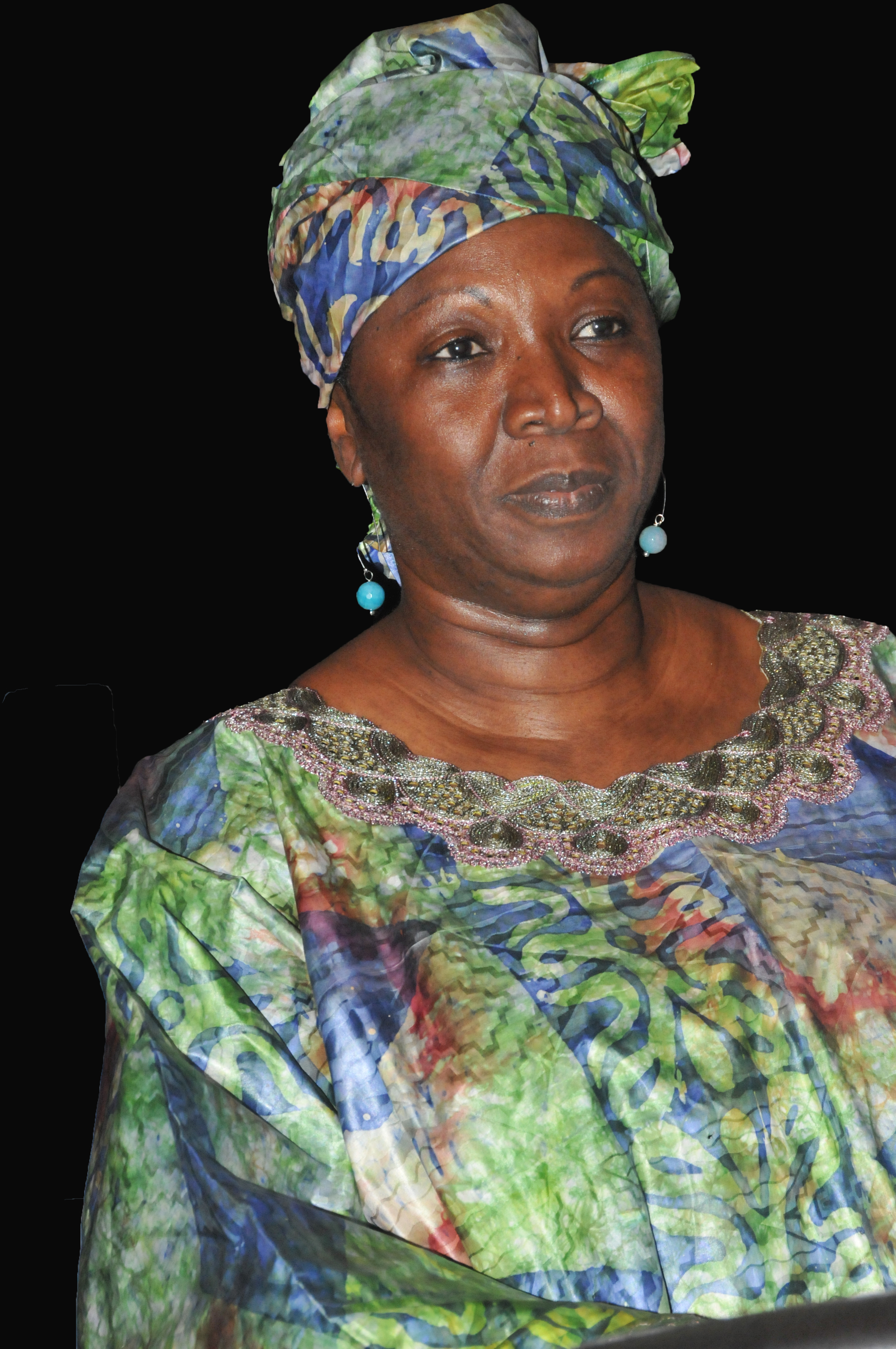
Mariam Sy Diawara

Mariam Sy Diawara is an Ivorian businesswoman specializing in communication and advertising, as well as a philanthropist. She is the founder and president of the House of Africa Mandingo, a house of culture and a museum, in Montreal, Quebec, Canada.

== Biography ==
Diawara was born in Abidjan, Ivory Coast. She is known in the world of advertising in Francophone Africa for creating the communication organization, Universe Group, which includes various advertising agencies, publishing, education and tourism in Ivory Coast. Diawara worked in the field of advertising in Ivory Coast and first came to Quebec in 1982. "I encouraged my children to study here. I arrived in Montreal in 2000 for a year, a political uprising in the country forcing my stay in Canada. It was during her stay in Montreal that the idea came to Diawara to create the House of Africa Mandingo. Since its creation, it has become a place of importance to Africans who live in Montreal as well as to Montrealers interested in Africa.

Diawara is the founder and president of the House of Africa Mandingo, an organization based in Montreal, with a presence in Burkina Faso, Ivory Coast, Mali and the United States. Since 2001, she directs the Canadian law firm, the Covenant/INC Universe Group. Diawara spent several years in communications. She founded media agencies, and worked in consulting, publications, events, and tourism in West Africa. From 1973 to 1993, she served as CEO in Ivory Media (Havas Africa), the national advertising agency (and head of Ivory advertising Media / Havas Africa (1973-1992)). She led companies in Ivory Coast, including the Universe group she founded and directed from 1993 to 2000. She has represented Africa on the board of the Francophone World Advertising. She is the initiator of the first African Book Fair held in Abidjan in 1993. She was President of the Association of Publishers in Ivory Coast from 1991 to 2000. She created the International Exhibition of leisure and tourism Abidjan (SITLA) held for the first time in November 1998. It is also the founder of the first edition of the Web Africa festival, held from 24 to 26 November 2014 in Abidjan. A philanthropist, Diawara supports various causes, especially for young people in Côte d'Ivoire and Africa. She founded Young Universe, the first youth newspaper in Cöte d'Ivoire and supported the creation of the Association of student entrepreneurs clubs from Ivory Coast in 2000. Diawara lives in Quebec since 2000 and has Canadian citizenship. She is the initiator of the Prix Afrikenous, which rewards the best image of Africa in the FESPACO.
