= Kanté =

Kanté is a surname. Notable people with the surname include:

- Abdoulaye Kanté (born 2000), French footballer
- Abdoulaye Kanté (born 2005), Ivorian footballer
- Aboubakary Kanté (born 1994), Gambian-French footballer
- Cédric Kanté (born 1979), Malian-French footballer
- Daouda Kanté (born 1978), Malian footballer
- Guyan Kanté (born 1982), Ivorian footballer
- José Kanté Martínez (born 1990), Spanish footballer
- Koly Kanté (born 1982), Malian footballer
- Lamine Kanté (born 1987), French basketball player
- Massiré Kanté (born 1989), French footballer
- Mohamed T. Kanté (born 1985), Malian-American technologist and social entrepreneur
- Mory Kanté (born 1997), Guinean footballer
- Mory Kanté (1950–2020), Guinean-Malian musician
- N'Golo Kanté (born 1991), French footballer
- Ousmane Kanté (born 1989), Guinean-French footballer
- Seydou Badjan Kanté (born 1981), Ivorian footballer
- Soumaoro Kanté (13th century), king of the Sosso people
- Youssouf Kanté (born 1984), French footballer
