= Fousseni Diawara =

Malian footballer (born 1980)

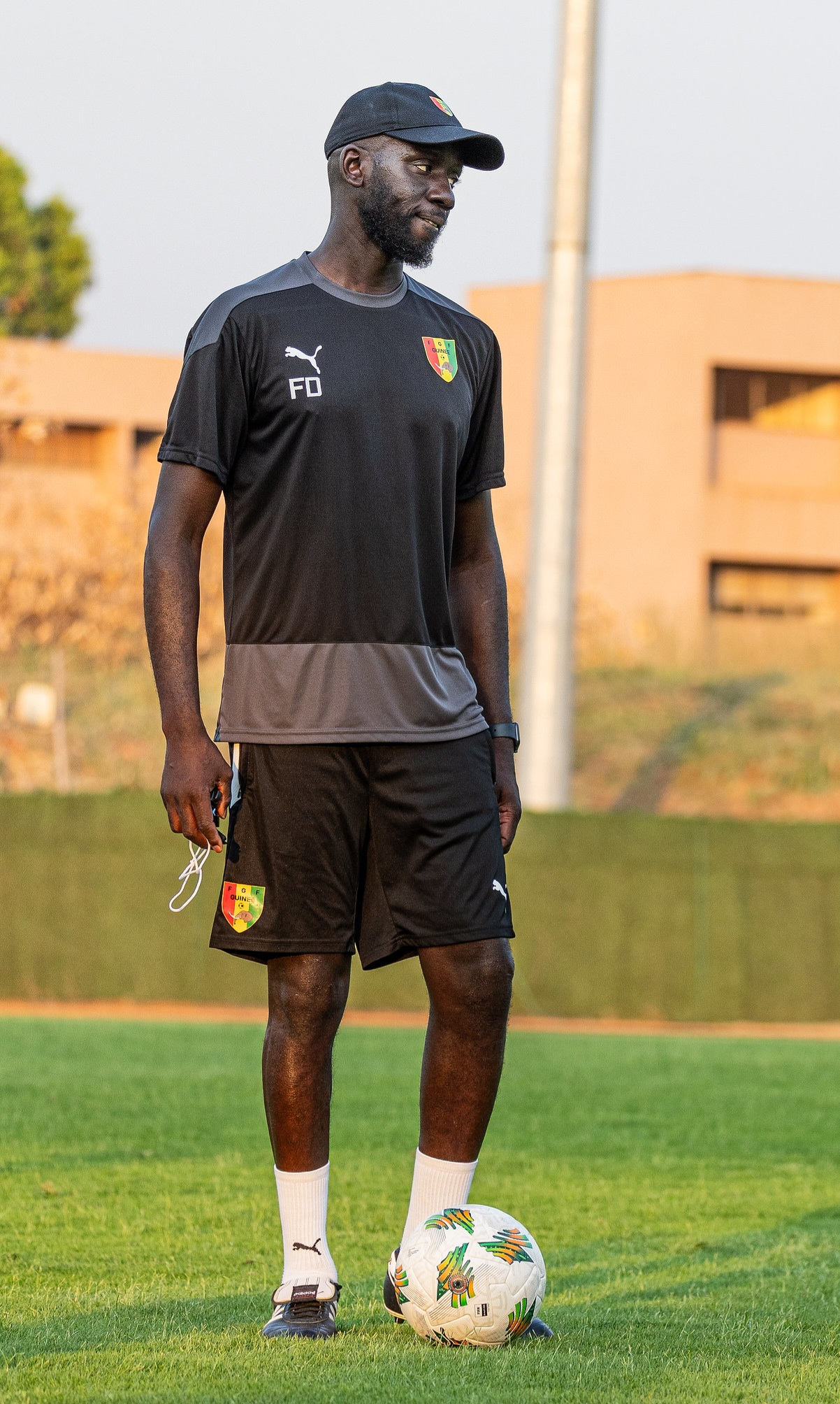
- Diawara in 2024 with Guinea

Personal information
- Date of birth: 28 August 1980 (age 46)
- Place of birth: Paris, France
- Height: 1.83 m (6 ft 0 in)
- Position: Right-back

Senior career*
Years	Team	Apps	(Gls)
1996–2001	Red Star	26	(0)
2000–2007	Saint-Étienne	119	(3)
2003–2004	→ Laval (loan)	20	(3)
2007	→ Sochaux (loan)	2	(0)
2007–2010	Panionios	21	(1)
2010	Istres	20	(0)
2010–2013	Ajaccio	70	(7)
2013–2015	Tours	44	(2)
Total		322	(16)

International career
2001–2015	Mali	53	(0)

Managerial career
- 2016–2019: Mali U23
- 2019–2022: Mali (assistant)
- 2023–2024: Guinea (assistant)
Medal record
Men's football
Representing Mali
Africa Cup of Nations
Third place	2013 South Africa
- * Club domestic league appearances and goals

Fousseni Diawara (born 28 August 1980) is a professional football manager and former player who played as a right-back. Born in France, he played for the Mali national team between 2001 and 2015.

== Club career ==
Starting his career in Parisien club Red Star, Diawara moved to Saint-Étienne in 2000 and made his debut against Rennes in September.

In January 2008, Diawara signed a 2.5-year deal with Panionios

On 10 September 2009, he signed a one-year deal with Istres. He signed for Ajaccio on 16 June 2010.

== International career ==
Diawara played international matches for the Mali national team.

== Managerial career ==
Diawara began his career as Mali national team coordinator at the end of his professional career after 2014–15 season.

On 12 December 2023 he was named assistant coach of Guinea national team, to support the coach, Kaba Diawara.

== Personal life ==
Diawara holds both French and Malian nationalities. He is the brother of footballers Samba and Abdoulaye.

== Honours ==
Mali

- Africa Cup of Nations bronze: 2013
