= Cisse =

Cisse may refer to:

- Cisse (river), a river flowing into the Loire at Vouvray, France
- Cisse, Poland, a Polish village
- Cisse Cameron, American actress (Space Mutiny)
- Brandon Cisse (born 2005), American football player
- Cisse, a snout moth genus nowadays considered a junior synonym of Herculia

Cissé may refer to

- Cissé, Vienne, a French commune
- Cissé (surname)
