= Kamissoko =

Kamissoko is a surname. Notable people with the surname include:

- Biagui Kamissoko (born 1983), French footballer
- Fousseny Kamissoko (born 1983), Equatoguinean footballer
- Mamadou Kamissoko (born 1993), French footballer
- Nouhoum Kamissoko (born 2004), Malian footballer
- Ousmane Kamissoko (born 1998), Malian footballer
