= Mohamed Diaby =

Ivorian footballer (born 1990)

Personal information
- Full name: Mohamed Ibrahim Diaby
- Date of birth: April 2, 1990 (age 36)
- Height: 1.85 m (6 ft 1 in)
- Position: Midfielder

Senior career*
Years	Team	Apps	(Gls)
- USC Bassam
2009	FC Shinnik Yaroslavl	1	(0)
2010–	USC Bassam	?	(1)
- * Club domestic league appearances and goals as of 01:59, 23 August 2010 (UTC)

Mohamed Ibrahim Diaby (born April 2, 1990) is an Ivorian football midfielder. He currently plays for USC Bassam in the Côte d'Ivoire Premier Division. In 2009, he played for FC Shinnik Yaroslavl in the Russian First Division.

== Career ==
Diaby made his debut for FC Shinnik on 24 June 2009 as a late substitute against FC Baltika Kaliningrad.

After leaving Shinnik, he returned to Bassam in 2010.

As of 2015, he's still on the books of USC Bassam.
