= Koma =

Koma may refer to:

== People ==
- Koma clan, a Japanese clan descended from the royal family of Goguryeo
- Koma (rapper), French rapper of Algerian origin
- David Koma, Georgian fashion designer based in London
- Gaolese Kent Koma (1918-2006), Botswana politician, statesman, and businessman
- Jaroslav Koma (born 1985), Czech ice hockey player
- Matthew Koma (born 1987), American musician and singer-songwriter
- Koma Otake (born 1948), Japanese dancer
- Koma Mayu (born 2002), a member of the South Korean girl group tripleS

== Places ==
- Koma, Egypt, a village in Egypt in late antiquity
- Koma, Iran
- Koma tou Gialou, Cyprus
- Koma Shrine, Shinto shrine in Saitama, Japan.

== Languages ==
- Koma language, a member of the Duru branch of Savanna languages of Cameroon
- Koma language (Bantu), a dialect of Simaa spoken in Zambia
- Koma language (Gur), also known as Konni, a language of Ghana

== Transportation ==
- Eppley Airfield in Omaha, Nebraska, United States
- Kōma Station (Iwate), in Morioka, Japan
- Koma Station (Saitama), in Hidaka, Saitama, Japan

== Other uses ==
- KOMA (FM), a radio station (92.5 FM) licensed to Oklahoma City, Oklahoma, United States
- KOKC (AM), a radio station (1520 AM) licensed to Oklahoma City, Oklahoma, United States, formerly known as KOMA
- Koma (film), a 2004 Hong Kong film
- Koma (cicada), a genus of cicadas
- Hyphaene, a genus of palms commonly called koma in Swahili
- Koma in Adamawa, a Nigerian ethnic group
- Koma Unwind, a beverage

== See also ==
- Coma (disambiguation)
- KOMU
