= Yacouba Sido =

Nigerien politician

Yacouba Sido (1910 in Maine Soroa, Niger – November 15, 1988 in Tanout) was a Nigerien politician who served in the French Senate from 1952-1958 .
