= Mariama Jalloh =

mari.ama
- Born: Freetown, Sierra Leone
- Genres: Folk, Soul, Afro pop
- Occupations: Singer, songwriter, moderator, curator, entrepreneur
- Instrument: Guitar
- Works: Easy Way Out, 2012 Moments Like These, 2015 Love, Sweat and Tears, 2018 A Woman Alone, 2021
- Labels: cinq7, Bendo, the Orchard, the Heart.Work
- Website: mariama-music.com

Mariama Jalloh (born 1986 in Sierra Leone) is a singer–songwriter.

== Life ==
Mariama Jalloh was born in Freetown, Sierra Leone. At the age of one she moved with her family to Germany, Bergisch Gladbach, the home of her mother. At sixteen, she began to write her own songs accompanied with her acoustic guitar. Two years later, she gained her first stage experience by performing in a musical.

== Music career ==
Her first important career steps were centered on the projects of Adé Bantu: Brothers Keepers, Afrobeat Academy and Afropean Express. Starting in 2008, she worked with the rapper Curse, thereby taking part in the project "Diversidad European Urban Experience". A year later she supported Max Herre on his tour for the album "Ein Geschenkter Tag". In the same year she embarked on her solo career, releasing her first EP, Listen To Mariama. Mariama was chosen from over 300 bands as one of the nine talents who were supported by the Volkswagen Sound Foundation in 2009. In 2010 she signed with the French label Cinq7 / Wagram Music and started working on her first album, The Easy Way Out. The debut was finally recorded at RAK Studios, London, where she worked with the production team Bacon & Quarmby, which had already produced Ziggy Marley and Finley Quaye, among other artists.

== Discography ==
=== EP ===
- Still Waiting/Fall in Love (2008)
- Listen to Mariama (2009)
- No Way (2013)
- Moments Like These (2015)

=== LP ===
- Easy Way Out (2012)
- Love, Sweat and Tears (2019)
