= Abdoulaye Diawara (footballer, born 1983) =

Malian footballer

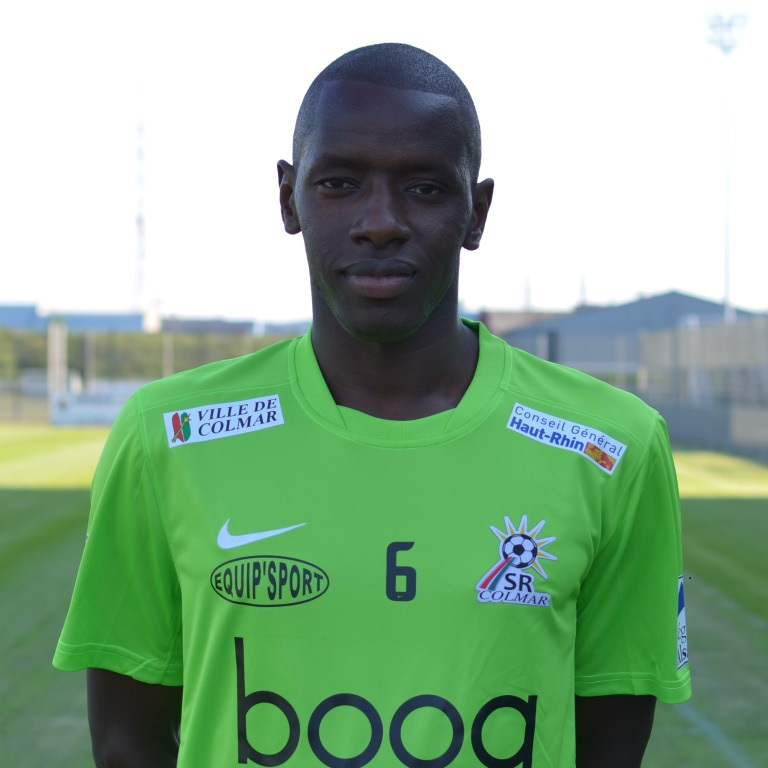
- Diawara with SR Colmar in 2014

Personal information
- Full name: Abdoulaye Diawara
- Date of birth: 26 January 1983 (age 43)
- Place of birth: Paris, France
- Height: 1.87 m (6 ft 2 in)
- Position: Midfielder

Team information
- Current team: SR Colmar

Youth career
- –2004: Paris Saint-Germain

Senior career*
| Years | Team | Apps | (Gls) |
| 2004–2005 | Sint-Truiden | 13 | (1) |
| 2005–2007 | RCS Visé | 74 | (4) |
| 2007–2013 | Paris | 151 | (8) |
| 2010–2011 | → AS Beauvais (loan) | 22 | (0) |
| 2013–2015 | SR Colmar | 67 | (8) |
| 2015–2016 | CA Bastia | 24 | (0) |
| 2016–2018 | SAS Épinal | 30 | (1) |
| 2018–2019 | C'Chartres | 23 | (0) |
| 2019–2020 | Haguenau | 21 | (0) |
| 2020– | SR Colmar | 36 | (1) |

International career
| 2001–2003 | Mali U23 | | |
- * Club domestic league appearances and goals as of 20:11, 27 October 2022 (UTC)

Abdoulaye Diawara (born 26 January 1983) is a professional footballer who plays as a midfielder for SR Colmar. Born in Paris as the younger brother of Fousseni and Samba, he represented Mali at the youth level and started his career at PSG. He played for Paris FC from 2007 to 2013. In June 2013, he signed with SR Colmar.
