= Kondé =

Coordinates: 9.6268°N 1.4515°E

- Arrondissement
- Interactive map of Kondé
- Country: Benin
- Department: Donga Department
- Commune: Ouaké

Population (2002)
  - Total: 5,472
- Time zone: UTC+1 (WAT)

Kondé is an arrondissement in the Donga department of Benin. It is an administrative division under the jurisdiction of the commune of Ouaké. According to the population census conducted by the Institut National de la Statistique Benin on February 15, 2002, the arrondissement had a total population of 5,472.
