= Isha Sesay =

Journalist and TV presenter

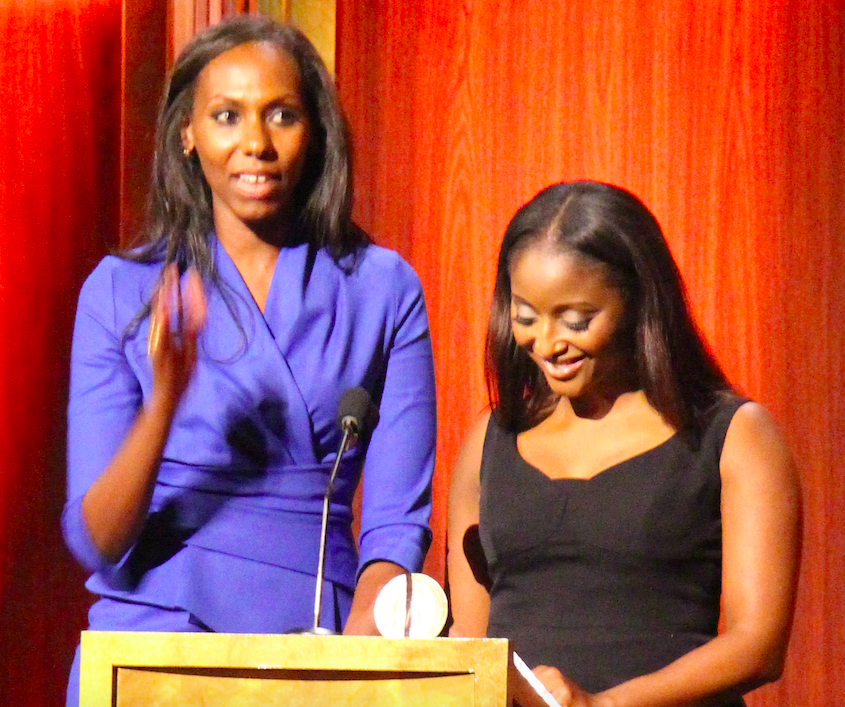
- Isha Sesay (right) and Nima Elbagir (left) at the 2015 Peabody Awards
- Born: Isha Isatu Sesay; 6 January 1976 (age 50); London, England
- Education: English
- Alma mater: Trinity College, Cambridge
- Occupation: News presenter journalist
- Years active: 1998–present
- Relatives: Kadi Sesay (mother)
- Website: Isha Sesay on X

Isha Isatu Sesay (/ˈaɪʃə səˈseɪ/ EYE-shə sə-SAY; born 6 January 1976) is a British journalist of Sierra Leonean descent. From 2005 to 2018, she worked as an anchor and correspondent for CNN International. She was originally based at CNN's world headquarters in Atlanta, Georgia, U.S. and now based in Los Angeles, California, where she hosted the news programs CNN Newsroom Live from Los Angeles. She was the presenter of the "360 Bulletin" on Anderson Cooper 360°. In 2012, Sesay joined HLN as a co-anchor for Evening Express. She left CNN in 2018 to support an Africa girls' education project called W.E. Can Lead, write a book and pursue various other personal projects.

== Youth and education ==
Born in London, England in 1976 to Temne parents from Sierra Leone, Sesay returned with them at the age of seven to their homeland. Raised in their Muslim faith, she lived in Sierra Leone for most of her childhood. She is one of three children, with an older sister and a younger brother. Isha's mother is Dr. Kadi Sesay, a former lecturer at Fourah Bay College. Dr. Sesay, in 1992, was appointed as an advisor to the government of Valentine Strasser. Isha's father worked as a legal advisor to the SLPMB (Sierra Leone Produce Marketing Board), a national regulatory institution; he died in 1988.

Sesay studied at the private Fourah Bay College School in Freetown. She also attended St. Joseph's Secondary School in Freetown. At the age of 16, in 1992 she moved to the UK for further study and college. After completing her A-levels, she was accepted into Trinity College, Cambridge, where she read English. She worked as a waitress in a bar while studying. She decided to become a television journalist, having previously aspired to become an actress. During her final year, she began writing to media groups seeking work.

== Career ==
=== Postcollege ===
After graduating, Sesay began her television career as a researcher for the BBC talk show Kilroy, initially as an unpaid intern. She later was hired as a full-time paid employee. In 1998, she moved to Glasgow to work for BBC Scotland, and, after a period behind the camera, got her first job as a TV announcer on BBC Choice. She went on to present a variety of programmes for the BBC, CNN and TWI, before joining Sky in March 2002.

=== Sky ===
At Sky, Sesay spent over three years as an anchor on Good Morning Sports Fans for Sky Sports News. She considers the high points of this period to be meeting former boxer Michael Watson, interviewing Ellen MacArthur, and travelling with members of the Arsenal football team following an exhibition match at Reebok Stadium in Manchester in support of Nwankwo Kanu's heart foundation. She later moved to ITN, where she anchored the ITV Morning News programme, and was also a newsreader on the breakfast programme GMTV.

=== CNN ===
In November 2005, Sesay became a news anchor and correspondent at CNN International, based at the network's global headquarters in Atlanta, Georgia, in the United States. She travelled to Nigeria in April 2007 to cover the presidential election, where she conducted one-on-one interviews with both outgoing president Olusegun Obasanjo, and the newly-elected president Umaru Yar'Adua. Later that year, she was in South Africa to cover the launch of the Global Elders.

==== International Desk ====
In 2009, Sesay became the host of the first edition of the weekday news program International Desk.

==== BackStory ====
In 2011, she swapped roles with Michael Holmes, and was assigned as the presenter of BackStory.

==== CNN NewsCenter ====
On 16 April 2012, BackStory was changed to a weekend-only show. Sesay was assigned as the anchor of a new show, CNN NewsCenter.

In addition to her duties as an anchor on CNN International, Sesay contributed to Anderson Cooper 360° on CNN as presenter of the 360 Bulletin, a position she held from 17 January 2011. The following year, she also took up the role of presenter on Evening Express on HLN. She is currently based in Los Angeles, United States.

==== Leaving CNN ====
On 2 August 2018, Sesay announced that she was leaving CNN after 13 years. She cited the media's focus on United States President Donald Trump as a reason for her decision. Sesay announced that she would be writing a book about the abduction of Chibok girls in Nigeria, and that she planned to continue her engagement with African issues.

=== W.E. Can Lead ===
W.E. Can Lead
- Established: 2014; 12 years ago
- Legal status: Active
- Headquarters: Atlanta, Georgia, USA
- Staff: Sharon Debary, Natalie Au, Robin Cutshaw, Stacey Brice Washington, William Asiko, Judithe Registre, Iris Kargbo, Rosaline Kargbo, Haja Koroma
- Website: we-canlead.org

External videos
- Isha Sesay (14 May 2016). "Isha Sesay on the vision behind W.E. Can Lead". Isha Sesay.

In 2014, Sesay launched W.E. Can Lead (Women Everywhere Can Lead), an educational, humanitarian 501(c)(3), non-profit organization. It was created to support African girls in receiving educational support to become future leaders. In August 2018, the program was mostly working with Nigerian girls, but it is open for girls from everywhere in Africa.

It is a two-tiered program comprising a base and a specialization phase. After one year in which the girls learn basic skills like financial literacy, critical thinking and good health practices as well how to build self-esteem and self-awareness, they can apply to take part in the Young Leader development program. Those who do not gain a place may attend annual empowerment camps and an inspirational speaker series. The attendees receive financial support to cover tuition, uniforms and other supplies. In August 2018 there were more than 600 girls from ages 12 to 18 participating in the program.

In January 2017, actor Idris Elba auctioned a date with him to raise money for W.E. Can Lead. They cooperated again in 2019, when they started a tombola in which donors could win a McLaren 720S Coupé.

=== Independent activities since 2018 ===
Sesay works as a freelance presenter and speaker (whereby this list is not intended to be complete).

Sesay partnered with Bellanaija and AWB for a five-day series, “#ENDSARS: The Struggle to Save Nigeria” which investigated the core of the youth-led movement and stories of heroism, patriotism, and defiance associated to the fight for Nigeria’s future.

Sesay, alongside the Senegalese journalist Aboubacry Ba, was the emcee of the Aiteo CAF Awards 2018, celebrated at the Centre international de conférences Abdou Diouf (CICAD) on Tuesday, 8 January 2019 in Dakar, Senegal.

In June 2018, she led a Q&A round with the director of the documentary Youth uUnstoppable, Slater Jewell-Kemker, and her executive producer Adrian Grenierdes. The documentary is about the green youth movement.

On the occasion of the 2018 World Refugee Day, Sesay spoke with Samantha Nutt, founder of War Child the USA, an organization to help and protect children from warzones.

In April 2019, she hosted a public discussion with Michelle Obama under the name Becoming: an intimate conversation with Michelle Obama in front of 20.000 guests at the Accor Hotel Arena in Paris and in Amsterdam.

Her book Beneath the Tamarind Tree about the abduction of Chibok girls in 2014 was published in July 2019 by HarperCollins and as an audiobook on different platforms.

In June 2019, Sesay was a speaker at the Women Deliver Conference in Vancouver, Canada. The Women deliver conference is an international conference around topics like gender equality, health and wellbeing of girls in the 21st century.

She was a speaker at the 2019 Brilliant minds event in Stockholm, Sweden. The event was initiated in 2015 by Spotify founder and CEO Daniel Ek and serial entrepreneur Arash Pournouri. The event claims to support open thinking in the music and technology industry.

In September 2019, Sesay was invited as a guest speaker in the BBC program Africa today for two days, where she talked on women's representation in the media.

In September 2019, she was one of the hosts of the Global Citizen Festival together with Bozoma Saint John. This event connects live music with speeches and discussions on actual global problems of society, environment, and politics and is closely related to the Global Poverty Project.

Also in September 2019, she was a speaker at the Whitaker Peace & Development Initiative "Place for Peace" event.

== Books ==
- Sesay, Isha (7 September 2019). Beneath the Tamarind Tree — A Story of Courage, Family, and the Lost Schoolgirls of Boko Haram. Harper. ISBN 978-0062686671.

== Personal life ==
Sesay was married to Leif Coorlim, a CNN staffer. The couple are divorced. She gave birth to her daughter on February 17, 2023, through IVF, after two unsuccessful IVFs.
