= Abdoulaye Diawara (footballer, born 1981) =

Ivorian footballer (1981–2024)

Personal information
- Date of birth: 10 April 1981
- Place of birth: Abidjan, Ivory Coast
- Date of death: 15 April 2024 (aged 43)
- Place of death: Bingerville, Ivory Coast
- Height: 1.77 m (5 ft 10 in)
- Position: Defender

Youth career
- 2003–2004: JMG Academy Abidjan

Senior career*
Years	Team	Apps	(Gls)
2004–2008	KSK Beveren	118	(3)
2008–2009	KSK Hasselt	30	(0)
2009	KSK Kallo	12	(0)
2010–2012	KSK Hasselt	41	(1)
2012–2014	Paris FC	6	(1)
2012–2014	Paris FC B	10	(0)
- * Club domestic league appearances and goals

Abdoulaye "Diabis" Diawara (10 April 1981 – 15 April 2024) was an Ivorian footballer who played as a defender.
