= Louis Le Gros =

Senegalese politician

Louis Le Gros (31 December 1893 in Gorée, Senegal – 10 September 1969 in Nice, France) was a politician from Senegal who served in the French Senate from 1952–1958.
