= Isatou Ceesay =

Gambian recycling activist

Isatou Ceesay (born 1972) is a Gambian activist and social entrepreneur, sometimes referred to as the Queen of Recycling. She initiated a recycling movement called One Plastic Bag in the Gambia. Through this movement, she has trained women in The Gambia to recycle plastic waste into sellable products, providing them with a source of income.

== Early years and education ==
Ceesay grew up on a farm in the small village of N’jau in Gambia. Following her father's death and due to social and economic constraints affecting women at the time, she was unable to complete a formal education and left school for financial reasons. She subsequently began making and selling toys from scraps of clothing and wood, which were sold locally.

Using her earnings and a small inheritance, Ceesay enrolled at the Gambia Technical Institute, where she trained as a secretary. She later participated in a U.S. Peace Corps program, through which she gained knowledge relevant to community-based development initiatives.

Career

Nearly twenty years later, Ceesay observed that even the main streets of N’jau were heavily affected by waste accumulation, including discarded plastics, tins, tires, household waste, and especially plastic bags, often surrounded by standing water that attracted malaria-carrying mosquitoes. Public spaces such as playgrounds, food markets, and animal feeding areas were located near these waste sites, with residents largely unaware of the associated health and environmental risks. As a result, the village experienced livestock deaths caused by the ingestion of plastic, as well as recurring outbreaks of malaria and other diseases, due to the absence of an organized waste disposal system beyond dumping refuse behind homes.

In addition, economic hardship led some residents to burn plastic waste for cooking and warmth, further contributing to health and environmental concerns. These conditions prompted Ceesay to take action. Drawing on her experience with recycling and upcycling acquired through the Peace Corps, and working with a local women’s group, she developed a method of reusing plastic bags to create purses for sale. Participants collected, cleaned, and cut plastic bags into yarn-like strands, commonly referred to as “plarn,” which were then woven into small handbags. Approximately ten plastic bags were required to produce each item.

Despite these efforts, the initiative initially faced social resistance, as prevailing norms discouraged women from engaging in income-generating work outside the household, and participants were criticized for collecting waste materials. Doubts were also raised regarding the women’s ability to manage the project. Nevertheless, Ceesay transported the products to a nearby city, where the first batch sold out, enabling the project to expand. The initiative began generating income for participating women, contributing to household financial stability, and ultimately led to the establishment of the N’jau Recycling and Income Generation Group (NRIGG).

Ceesay continued to support the group’s development by assisting members with financial literacy, including opening bank accounts, and by establishing a skills center in N’jau focused on vocational, professional, and life skills training. The center and its operating model have since expanded, producing a range of goods from different types of waste, including compost, jewelry, beads, armchairs, and stools, and selling products in larger markets, including the United States.

The project was later formally recognized as a community-based organization in The Gambia under the name NRIGG. As of recent reports, Ceesay works with more than 11,000 people, and NRIGG operates in four communities across The Gambia.

== Awards and recognition ==
- In 2012, Ceesay was honored with the International Alliance for Women Difference Maker Award in Washington, D.C., United States
- Her story was published in a book authored by Miranda Paul and Illustrated by Elizabeth Zunon
- Ceesay was recognized as one of the 100 Most Reputable Africans for 2025 by Reputable Poll International.
