= Alimamy Koroma =

Sierra Leonean politician

Alimamy I.B. Koroma is a Sierra Leonean politician from the All People's Congress (APC) and the current Sierra Leonean Minister of Trade and Industry. He was appointed to the position by president Ernest Bai Koroma in October 2007.
