= Guinea-Bissau Creole =

Portuguese-based creole of Guinea-Bissau, Senegal and The Gambia

- Kiriol, Crioulo
- guinensi, kriyol, kiriol, purtuguis 'kriolo'
- Native to: Guinea-Bissau, Cape Verde, Senegal, The Gambia
- Native speakers: L1: 350,000 (2013–2022); L2: 1.5 million (2013–2022)
- Language family: Portuguese Creole: Afro-Portuguese Creole; Upper Guinea Creole; Guinea-Bissau Creole

Language codes
- ISO 639-3: pov
- Glottolog: uppe1455
- Linguasphere: 51-AAC-ab

Guinea-Bissau Creole, also known as Kiriol or Crioulo, is a creole language whose lexicon derives mostly from Portuguese. It is spoken in Guinea Bissau, Senegal and The Gambia. It is also called by its native speakers as guinensi, kriyol, or portuguis.

Guinea-Bissau Creole is spoken as a native tongue by 250,000 Bissau-Guineans and as a second language by 1,000,000.

A variant of Guinea-Bissau Creole is also spoken in southern Senegal, mainly in the region of Casamance, a former Portuguese colony, which is known as Portuguis Creole or Casamance Creole. Creole is the majority language of the inhabitants of the Casamance region and is used as a language of commerce.

Standard Portuguese is the official language of Guinea-Bissau, but Guinea-Bissau Creole is the language of trade, informal literature and entertainment. It is not used in either news media, parliament, public services or educational programming.

== History ==
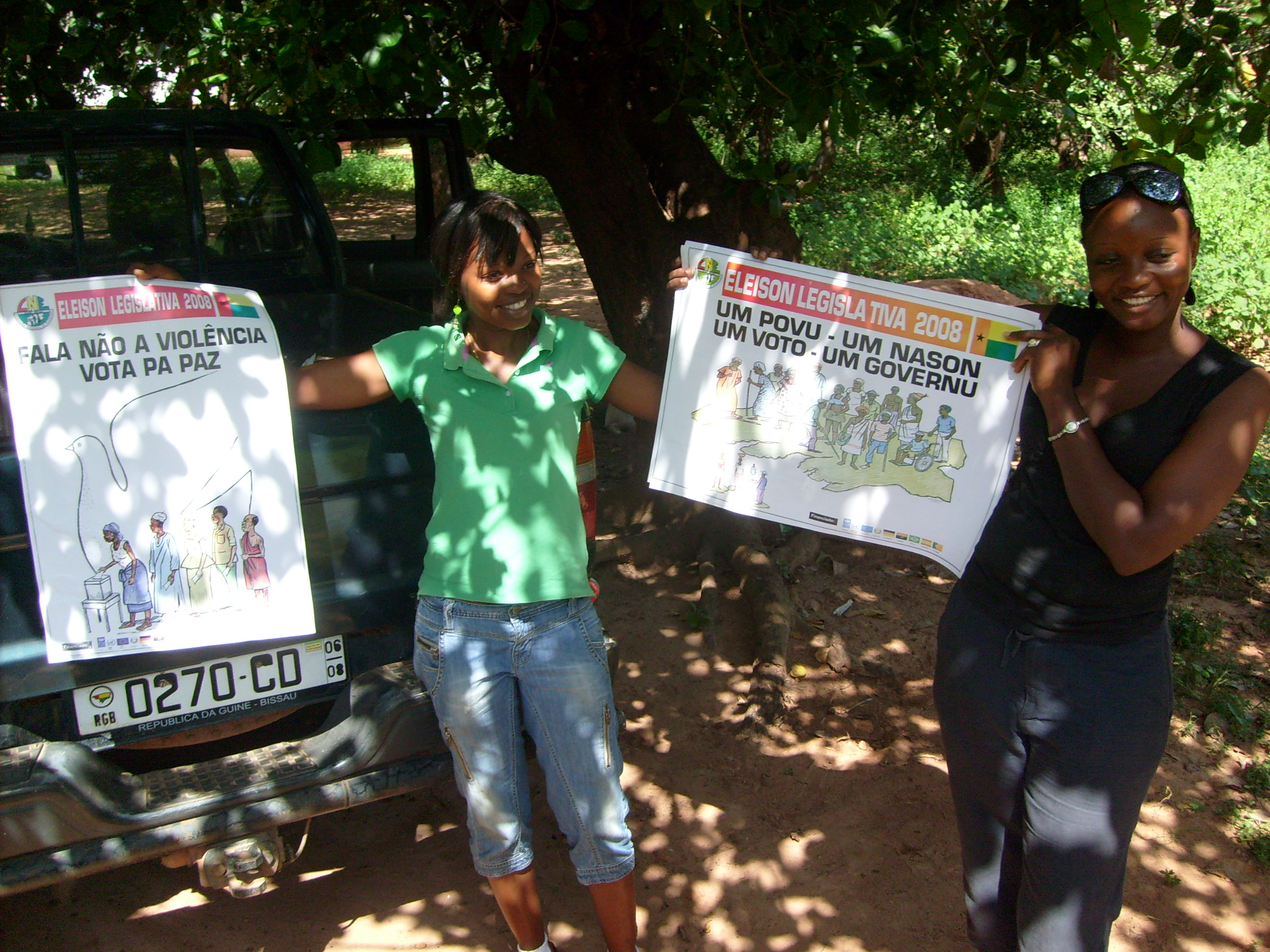
Election signs in Guinea-Bissau Creole.

The creoles of Upper Guinea are among the oldest attested Portuguese-based creoles. Their origins lie in the context of the first Portuguese settlements along the coasts of Northwest Africa, beginning in the 15th century. Guinea-Bissau Creole, in particular, derives from the creole initially formed on the island of Santiago, in Cape Verde, before undergoing a process of diffusion to the African continent. This expansion resulted from the mobility and social interactions of various Cape Verdean groups: the "lançados" —people of mixed race or descendants of Portuguese who settled outside colonial control—as well as traders, artisans, and administrative employees from Cape Verde, whose presence was crucial in the region's economic and political landscape. Through their exchanges, marriage alliances, and roles as linguistic and cultural intermediaries, these actors contributed to the lasting establishment and stabilization of the creole in local societies. These historical and sociolinguistic dynamics have thus laid the foundations of contemporary Bissau-Guinean Creole.

There are three main varieties of this creole in Guinea-Bissau and Senegal: Bissau and Bolama, Bafata, and Cacheu–Ziguinchor.

The creole's substrate language is the language of the local peoples: Mandingas, Manjacos, Pepéis and others, but most of the lexicon (around 80%) comes from Portuguese.

The Portuguese-influenced dialect of Casamance, known as Portuguis Creole or Casamance Creole, similar to the one of Cacheu (Guinea-Bissau) has some influence of French. Fijus di Terra (Filhos da Terra, English: Children of the Land) and Fijus di Fidalgu (Port. Filhos de Fidalgo, Eng. Children of Nobles) speak it, all of them are known, locally, as Purtuguis because they adopt European habits, are Catholics and speak a Creole. They are descendants of Portuguese men and African women. Most of them have Portuguese surnames, such as da Silva, Carvalho or Fonseca. The former Casamance Kingdom made a friendly alliance with the Portuguese and the local king adopted European lifestyle, and there were Portuguese in his court. In 1899, the city was ceded to France and in the middle of the 20th century, the language spread to the surrounding area. After Senegal's independence from France, the Creole people were seen as friends of the French, and discrimination by the more numerous northern Wolof-speaking community started, which has caused Casamance to struggle for independence since 1982. Today, although they continue to struggle, the movement is more placid and learning Portuguese is popular in Casamance because they see it has a link to their past. It is also learned across Senegal since the independence of the country from France. In Senegal, the creole is the first language of at least 46,500 people (1998); it is mainly spoken in Ziguinchor, but there are also speakers in other Casamance cities and in The Gambia.

The use of Guinea-Bissau Creole is still expanding but with growing interference from Portuguese (due to television, literacy, prestige and emigration to Portugal) and African languages (through the migration of speakers of native African languages to the main urban centres of Guinea-Bissau, where the creole is prevalent). Because Standard Portuguese is the official language in Guinea-Bissau, there is a code switching between the creole and standard Portuguese and/or native African languages.

== Example ==
Language	Text
Creole	Tudu pekaduris ta padidu libri i igual na balur suma na diritus. Suma e dadu motivu e di konsiensia, e dibi di sempri azi un pa nutru suma ermons.
Portuguese	Os seres humanos nascem livres e iguais em dignidade e em direitos. Dotados de razão e de consciência, devem agir uns para com os outros em espírito de fraternidade.
English	All human beings are born free and equal in dignity and rights. They are endowed with reason and conscience and should act towards one another in a spirit of brotherhood.

== Literature ==
- Biagui, Noël-Bernard; Quint, Nicolas (2013). "Casamancese Creole". In Michaelis, S. M.; Mauer, P.; Haspelmath, M.; Huber, M. (eds.). The Survey of Pidgin & Creole Languages. Vol. II, Portuguese–based, Spanish based and French-based Languages. Oxford: Oxford University Press. pp. 40–49.
- Biagui, Noël Bernard (2018). Description générale du créole afro-portugais de Ziguinchor (Sénégal) (in French). Paris: Karthala. ISBN 978-2-8111-1907-2.
- Jacobs, Bart (2010). "Upper Guinea Creole: Evidence in Favor of A Santiago Birth" (PDF). Journal of Pidgin and Creole Languages. 25 (2): 289–343. doi:10.1075/jpcl.25.2.04jac.
- Kihm, Alain (1994). Kriyol Syntax: The Portuguese-Based Creole Language of Guinea-Bissau. Amsterdam: J. Benjamins. ISBN 9789027276674 – via Google Books.
- Nicoleti, Elizabeth Colleen (2011). Body-Part Idioms in Crioulo of Guinea-Bissau (PDF) (Master's thesis). The Graduate Institute of Applied Linguistics.
- Wilson, William André Auquier (1962). The Crioulo of Guiné. Johannesburg: Witwatersrand University Press – via Google Books.
- Sabou Almeida – Crioulu Grammar Made Simple (Peace Corps 1991)
- Luigi Scantamburlo – Dicionário Do Guineense (Fasbeti 2003) Archived 2019-08-29 at the Wayback Machine
