= Djeli Moussa Diawara =

- Born: February 1962 (age 64); Kankan, Guinea
- Genres: Mandingo, salsa, flamenco, blues, jazz
- Occupations: Musician, songwriter
- Instruments: Kora, guitar, balafon
- Label: CybearSonic
- Formerly of: Kora Jazz Trio

Djeli Moussa Diawara (born February 1962) is a kora player, composer and singer from Guinea.

== Biography ==
Djeli Moussa Diawara (also spelled as Jali Musa Jawara) was born to a Griot family in Kankan, Guinea. His father was a balafon player, and his mother a singer. His half-brother, sharing the same mother, was Mory Kanté. He is a "jali," or "djeli", a Mandinka word for griot. He learnt to play the balafon, the kora and the guitar.

At 18 he played with his half-brother, who left the Rail Band, in Abidjan, Ivory Coast. Starting his solo career, he worked with Djenne Doumbia, a singer who later joined Salif Keita's group.

In 1983, his first LP Yasimika was recorded and published in Abidjan. It was then re-released in Europe on various record and was positively reviewed, particularly in France and the United Kingdom.

His Flamenkora album was published in 1998, offering a rich blend of styles, from his Mandingo roots to Flamenco.

In 2000, Djeli Moussa recorded the album Ocean Blues – from Africa to Hawaï with Bob Brozman. The album, which was recorded in single day in Santa Cruz, combined the styles of West African music and Hawaiian music. The album received good reviews.

Since then, he founded Kora Jazz Trio, joined by Abdoulaye Diabaté (sénégal) (piano) and Moussa Cissoko (drums). Djeli Moussa composed most of the tracks, particularly those on which he sings, and he played the kora and sometimes the guitar on the three albums released so far (Part I, II, & III).

Diawara left the Kora Jazz Tio in 2010.

Singer and musician, Djeli Moussa developed an intimate relationship with his 32-stringed kora, which is unique and was adapted at his request from the 21-stringed traditional Kora. He is able to adapt to many different rhythms, from traditional mandingo to salsa, flamenco, blues and jazz.

He has worked with many artists, including Ali Farka Touré, Carlos Santana, Manu Dibango, Janice deRosa, Stephan Eicher, and Cheick Tidiane Seck.

== Discography ==
=== Solo ===
- 1983 – Yasimika (LP – republished as CD in 1991)
- 1988 – Soubindoor (World Circuit)
- 1992 – Cimadan
- 1996 – Sobindo
- 1998 – Flamenkora
- 2000 – Ocean Blues – from Africa to Hawaï with Bob Brozman
- 2006 – Sini
- 2010 – Yasimika (Abidjan 1982), remastered version of Djeli Moussa's first album
- 2011 – Yékéké (Paris 2010)

=== With Kora Jazz Trio ===
- 2003 – Part I
- 2005 – Part II
- 2008 – Part III

=== Miscellaneous ===
- 1985 – Johnny Copeland – Djeli Moussa composed and played Djeli, Djeli Blues as Johnny's Special Guest, on "Bringin' It All Back Home"
- 2009 – Mayra Andrade "Stória, stória..."
- 2006 – OST for Eliane de Latour movie "Après l'océan" – song Kanta
- 2005 – OST by Manu Dibango for Michel Ocelot French animated feature film "Kirikou et les bêtes sauvages"
