= Mandinka people =

West African ethnic group

Mandinka
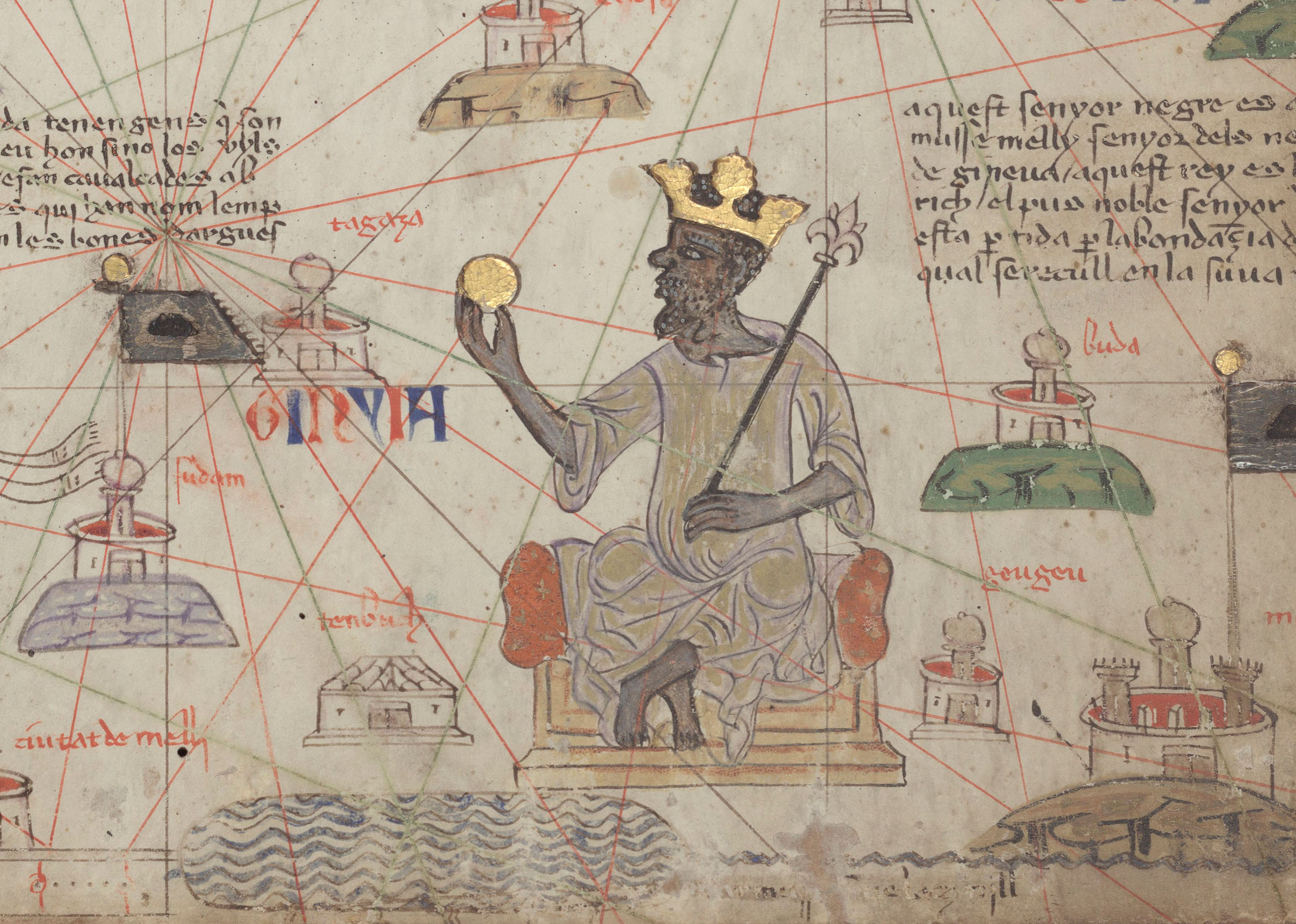
- A 14th-century European depiction of Mansa Musa, the famous Mandinka ruler of the Mali Empire, from the Catalan Atlas (1375). This image reflects a medieval European artistic style and perspective.

Total population
- c. 11 million

Regions with significant populations
- Guinea: 3,786,101 (29.4%)
- Mali: 1,881,221 (8.4%)
- Senegal: 900,617 (5.6%)
- The Gambia: 700,568 (34.4%)
- Sierra Leone: 360,080 (4.1%)
- Guinea-Bissau: 212,269 (14.7%)
- Liberia: 166,849 (3.2%)
- Ghana: 6,600

Languages
- Manding languages (primary); Western Maninka, Eastern Maninka, Kita Maninka language, Mandinka: English; French; Portuguese; Arabic

Religion
- Islam

Related ethnic groups
- Other Mandé peoples, especially the Bambara, Dioula, Yalunka, and Khassonké

The Mandinka or Malinke (Note: Alternative spellings include Maninka, Manding, Mandinga, Mandingo and Mandinko. Forms with g are generally considered archaic and are mostly found in 19th-century and early-20th-century literature. They have been sometimes erroneously referred to as Dioula or Bambara, which are other closely related Mandé peoples.) are a West African ethnic group indigenous to southern Mali, The Gambia, southern Senegal and eastern Guinea. Numbering about 15 million, they are the largest subgroup of the Mandé peoples and one of the largest ethnolinguistic groups in Africa. They speak the Manding languages in the Mande language family, which are a lingua franca in much of West Africa. They are predominantly subsistence farmers and live in rural villages. Their largest urban center is Bamako, the capital of Mali. In Mali, the Mandinka people are especially concentrated in the regions of Kita (49%), Kayes (25%), and Koulikoro (14%).

The Mandinka are the descendants of the Mali Empire, which rose to power in the 13th century under the rule of king Sundiata Keita, who founded an empire that would go on to span a large part of West Africa. They migrated west from the Niger River in search of better agricultural lands and more opportunities for conquest. Nowadays, the Mandinka inhabit the West Sudanian savanna region extending from The Gambia and the Casamance region in Senegal, Mali, Guinea and Guinea Bissau. Although widespread, the Mandinka constitute the largest ethnic group only in the countries of Mali, Guinea and The Gambia. Most Mandinka live in family-related compounds in traditional rural villages. Their traditional society has featured socially stratified castes. Mandinka communities have been fairly autonomous and self-ruled, being led by a chief and group of elders. Mandinka has been an oral society, where mythologies, history and knowledge are verbally transmitted from one generation to the next. Their music and literary traditions are preserved by a caste of griots, known locally as jalolu (singular, jali), as well as guilds and brotherhoods like the donso (hunters).

Between the 16th and 19th centuries, many Mandinka people, along with numerous other African ethnic groups, were captured within Africa, often by African polities and traders, and sold to European slavers who transported them across the Atlantic to the Americas. They intermixed with slaves and workers of other ethnicities, creating a Creole culture. The Mandinka people significantly influenced the African heritage of descended peoples now found in Brazil, Cape Verde, the Southern United States and, to a lesser extent, the Caribbean.

== History ==
=== Origins ===
The history of Mandinka, as with many Mandé peoples, begins with the Ghana Empire, also known as Wagadu. Mande hunters founded communities in Manden, which would become the political and cultural center of the Mandinka, but also in Bambuk and the Senegal River valley. The Mande diaspora from Ghana extended from the Atlantic Ocean to Gao.

The mythical ancestors of the Malinké people are Kontron and Sanin, the founding "hunter brotherhood". Manden was famous for the large number of animals and game that it sheltered, as well as its dense vegetation, so was a very popular hunting ground. The Camara (or Kamara) are believed to be the oldest family to have lived in Manden, after having left Wagadou, due to drought. They founded the first village of Manding, Kiri, then Kirina, Siby, Kita. A very large number of families that make up the Mandinka community were born in Manden. Manding is the province from which the Mali Empire started, under the leadership of Sundiata Keita. The Manden were initially a part of many fragmented kingdoms that formed after the collapse of Ghana Empire in the 11th century.

=== Mali Empire ===
During the rule of Sundiata Keita, these kingdoms were consolidated, and the Mandinka expanded west from the Niger River basin under Sundiata's general Tiramakhan Traore. This expansion was a part of creating a region of conquest, according to the oral tradition of the Mandinka people. This migration began in the later part of the 13th century.

The beginnings of Mandinka
We originated from Tumbuktu in the land of the Mandinka: the Arabs were our neighbours there... All the Mandinka came from Mali to Kaabu.

— Mandinka de Bijini, Transl: Toby Green
The oral traditions in Guinea-Bissau

Another group of Mandinka people, under Faran Kamara – the son of the king of Tabou – expanded southeast of Mali, while a third group expanded with Fakoli.

With the migration, many gold artisans and metal working Mandinka smiths settled along the coast and in the hilly Fouta Djallon and plateau areas of West Africa. Their presence and products attracted Mandinka merchants and trading caravans from north Africa and the eastern Sahel, but also brought conflicts with other ethnic groups, such as the Wolof people, particularly the Jolof Empire.

The caravan trade to North Africa and Middle East brought Islamic people into Mandinka people's original and expanded home region. The Muslim traders sought presence in the host Mandinka community, and this likely initiated proselytizing efforts to convert the Mandinka from their traditional religious beliefs into Islam. In Ghana, for example, the Almoravids had divided its capital into two parts by 1077, one part was Muslim and the other non-Muslim. The Muslim influence from North Africa had arrived in the Mandinka region before this, via Islamic trading diasporas.

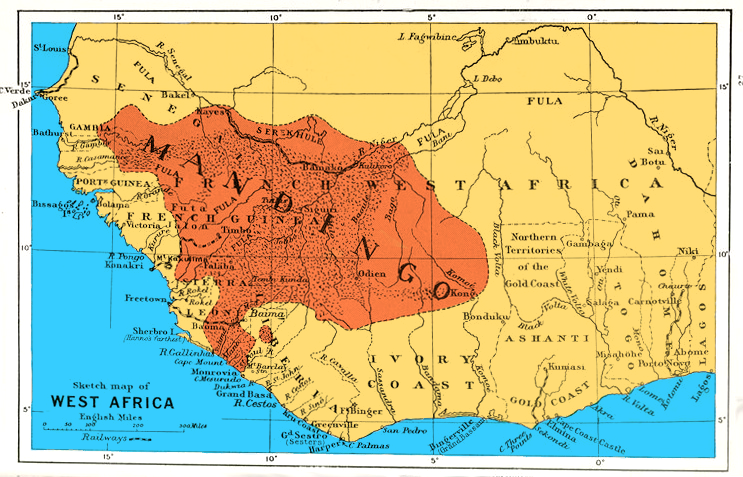
A map of West Africa showing Mandinka peoples, languages and influence, 1906

In 1324, Mansa Musa who ruled Mali, went on Hajj pilgrimage to Mecca with a caravan carrying gold. Shihab al-Umari, the Arabic historian, Musa built mosques in his kingdom, established Islamic prayers and took back Maliki school of Sunni jurists with him. According to Richard Turner, a professor of African American Religious History, Musa was highly influential in attracting North African and Middle Eastern Muslims to West Africa.

=== Western Branch ===
Regional oral traditions and historical scholarship, documented by historians like Djibril Tamsir Niane, indicate an early foundational presence of Mande-speaking groups who moved westward into the Senegambian landscape over centuries of regional shifts, having moved southward and westward from the drying of the Sahara long before modern imperial identities crystallized. Babacar Sedikh Diouf, a Serer scholar, attributes the construction of the region's iconic megalithic stone circles to these early Mande-speaking Soos or Soce groups, who also inhabited areas like the Dakar peninsula before establishing themselves in the river basins. Consequently, the Mandinka populations in The Gambia, Senegal, and Guinea-Bissau are viewed in this framework as primarily descendants of this foundational western Mande branch.

While the 13th-century military campaigns of general Tiramakhan Traore linked the region to the Mali Empire, scholars emphasize this expansion was primarily a small-scale, elite military migration rather than a wholesale population replacement. As historian Donald R. Wright notes, indigenous kings would frequently claim historical or genealogical ties to the Mali Empire purely for political prestige. Local autonomy and deep roots are instead evidenced by distinctively regional matrilineal traditions and prominent surnames like Manneh, Sanneh, and Sanyang that are largely absent in inland Mali.

The Mandinka people of Mali converted early, but those who migrated to the west did not convert and retained their traditional religious rites. One of the legends among the Mandinka of western Africa is that the general Tiramakhan Traore led the migration, because people in Mali had converted to Islam and he did not want to. Another legend gives a contrasting account, saying that Traore himself had converted and married Muhammad's granddaughter. According to Toby Green, Traore's marriage with Muhammad's granddaughter is fanciful, but these conflicting oral histories suggest that Islam had arrived well before the 13th century and had a complex interaction with the Mandinka people.

Through a series of conflicts, primarily with the Fula-led jihads under Imamate of Futa Jallon, many Mandinka converted to Islam. In contemporary West Africa, the Mandinka are predominantly Sunni Muslim, including in religiously diverse countries such as Guinea Bissau.

=== Trans-Saharan and Trans-Atlantic Slavery ===
Slave raiding, capture and trading in the Mandinka regions existed in significant numbers before the European colonial era, as is evidenced in the memoirs of the 14th century Moroccan traveller and Islamic historian Ibn Battuta. Slaves were part of the socially stratified Mandinka people, and several Mandinka language words, such as Jong or Jongo refer to slaves. There were fourteen Mandinke kingdoms along the Gambia River in the Senegambia region during the early 19th century, for example, where slaves were a part of the social strata in all these kingdoms.

Slave shipment between 1501 and 1867, by region (Note: This slave trade volume excludes the slave trade by Swahili-Arabs in East Africa and North African ethnic groups to the Middle East and elsewhere. The exports and imports do not match, because of the large number of deaths and violent retaliation by captured people on the ships involved in the slave trade.)
Region	Total embarked	Total disembarked
West central Africa	5.69 million	
Bight of Benin	2.00 million	
Bight of Biafra	1.6 million	
Gold Coast	1.21 million	
Windward Coast	0.34 million	
Sierra Leone	0.39 million	
Senegambia	0.76 million	
Mozambique	0.54 million	
Brazil (South America)		4.7 million
Rest of South America		0.9 million
Caribbean		4.1 million
North America		0.4 million
Europe		0.01 million

According to Toby Green, selling slaves along with gold was already a significant part of the trans-Saharan caravan trade across the Sahel between West Africa and the Middle East after the 13th century. With the arrival of Portuguese explorers in Africa as they looked for a sea route to India, the European purchase of slaves had begun. The shipment of slaves by the Portuguese, primarily from the Jolof people, along with some Mandinka, started in the 15th century, states Green, but the earliest evidence of a trade involving Mandinka slaves is from and after 1497 CE. In parallel with the start of the trans-Atlantic slave trade, the institution of slavery and slave-trading of West Africans into the Mediterranean region and inside Africa continued as a historic normal practice.

Slavery grew significantly between the 16th and 19th centuries. The Portuguese considered slave sources in Guinea and Senegambia parts of Mandinka territory as belonging to them; their 16th to 18th-century slave trade-related documents refer to "our Guinea" and complain about slave traders from other European nations superseding them in the slave trade. Their slave exports from this region nearly doubled in the second half of the 18th century compared to the first, and most of these slaves disembarked in Brazil.

Scholars have offered several theories on the source of the transatlantic slave trade of Mandinka people. According to Boubacar Barry, a professor of History and African Studies, chronic violence between ethnic groups such as the Mandinka people and their neighbours, combined with weapons sold by slave traders and lucrative income from slave ships to the slave sellers, fed the practice of groups raiding for captives, conducting manhunts, and taking slaves. The victimised ethnic group felt justified in retaliating. Slavery was already an accepted practice before the 15th century, when most enslaved people were taken on routes to North Africa and western Asia by Arab traders.

As the demand grew, states Barry, Futa Jallon, led by an Islamic military theocracy, became one of the centers of this slavery-perpetuating violence. Farim of Kaabu (the commander of Mandinka people in Kaabu) energetically hunted for slaves on a large scale. Martin Klein (a professor of African Studies) states that Kaabu was one of the early suppliers of African slaves to European merchants.

The historian Walter Rodney states that Mandinka and other ethnic groups already held slaves who had inherited slavery by birth, and who could be sold. The Islamic armies from Sudan had long established the practice of slave raids and trade. Fula jihad from Futa Jallon plateau perpetuated and expanded this practice.

These jihads captured the highest number of slaves to sell to Portuguese traders at the ports controlled by Mandinka people. The insecure ethnic groups, states Rodney, stopped working productively and tried to withdraw for security, which made their social and economic conditions more desperate. Though less powerful, such groups also joined the retaliatory cycle of slave raids and violence.

Walter Hawthorne (a professor of African History) states that the Barry and Rodney explanation was not universally true for all of Senegambia and Guinea, where high concentrations of Mandinka people have traditionally lived. Hawthorne says that numerous Mandinka were not exported to the various European colonies in North America, South America and the Caribbean until the period between the mid-18th through to the 19th century. During these years, slave trade records show that nearly 33% of the slaves from Senegambia and Guinea-Bissau coasts were Mandinka people. Hawthorne suggests three causes of Mandinka people being taken captive as slaves during this era: small-scale jihads by Muslims against non-Muslim Mandinka, non-religious reasons such as the economic greed of Islamic elites who wanted imports of goods and tools from the coast, and attacks by the Fula people on the Mandinka's Kaabu, with consequent cycle of violence.

== Economy ==
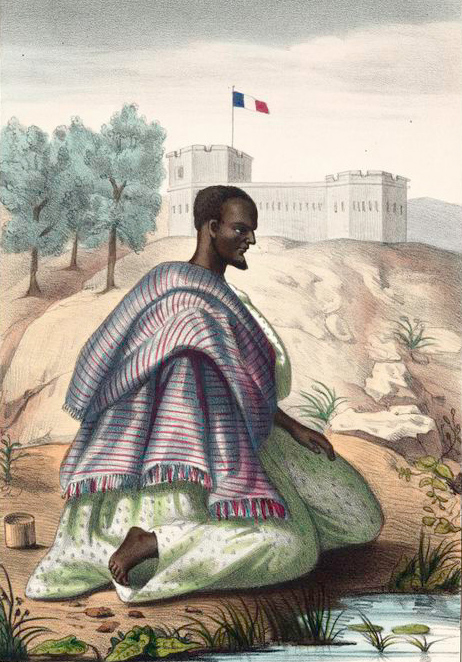
A Mandinka marabout

In the 21st century, the Mandinka continue as rural subsistence farmers who rely on peanuts, rice, millet, maize, and small-scale husbandry for their livelihood. During the wet season, men plant peanuts as their main cash crop. Men also grow millet. The women grow rice (traditionally, African rice), tending the plants by hand. This is extremely labour-intensive and physically demanding work. Only about 50% of the rice consumption needs are met by local planting; the rest is imported from Asia and the United States.

The oldest male is the head of the family, and marriages are commonly arranged. Small mud houses with conical thatch or tin roofs make up their villages, which are organised on the basis of clan groups. While farming is the predominant profession among the Mandinka, men also work as tailors, butchers, taxi drivers, woodworkers, metalworkers, soldiers, nurses, and extension workers for aid agencies.

== Religion ==
Today, most Mandinka people practice Islam.

Some Mandinka syncretise Islam and traditional African religions. Among these syncretists, it is believed that spirits can be controlled mainly through the power of a marabout, who knows the protective formulas. In most cases, the people do not make important decisions without first consulting a marabout. Marabouts, who have Islamic training, write Qur'anic verses on slips of paper and sew them into leather pouches (talisman); these are worn as protective amulets.

The conversion of the Mandinka to Islam took place over many centuries. According to Robert Wyndham Nicholls, Mandinka in Senegambia started converting to Islam as early as the 17th century, and most of Mandinka leatherworkers there converted to Islam before the 19th century. Mandinka musicians, however, were last, converting to Islam mostly in the first half of the 20th century. As in other locales, these Muslims have continued some of their pre-Islamic religious practices as well, such as their annual rain ceremony and "sacrifice of the black bull" to their past deities.

== Society and culture ==
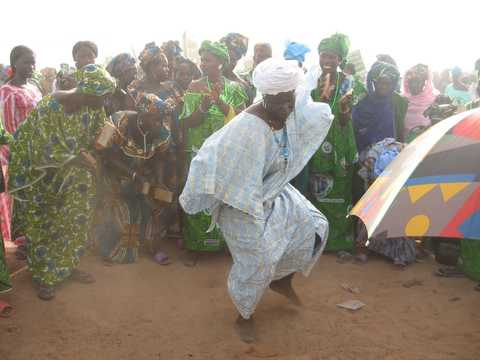
Mandinka dancing

Most Mandinka live in family-related compounds in traditional rural villages. Mandinka villages are fairly autonomous and self-ruled, being led by a council of upper-class elders and a chief who functions as a first among equals.

=== Family and political organisation ===
In Mandinka society the lu (extended family) is the basic unit, and is led by a fa (family head) who manages relations with other fa. A dugu (village) is formed by a collection of lu, and the dugu is led by the fa of the most important lu, aided by the dugu-tigi (village head or fa of the first lu that settled there). A group of dugu-tigi form a kafu (confederation) headed by a kafu-tigi. The Keita clan initially held the status of kafu-tigi before Sundiata's expansion and the creation of the mansa (king/emperor).

=== Social stratification ===
The Mandinka people have traditionally been a socially stratified society, as are many West African ethnic groups with castes. The Mandinka society, states Arnold Hughes, a professor of West African Studies and African Politics, has been "divided into three endogamous castes – the freeborn (foro), slaves (jongo), and artisans and praise singers (nyamolo). The freeborn castes are primarily farmers. The enslaved strata included labor providers to the farmers, as well as leather workers, pottery makers, metal smiths, griots, and others.

The Mandinka Muslim clerics and scribes have traditionally been considered a separate occupational caste called Jakhanke, with their Islamic roots traceable to about the 13th century.

The Mandinka castes are hereditary, and marriages outside the caste was forbidden. Their caste system is similar to those of other ethnic groups of the African Sahel region. These castes are also common across Mandinka communities such as those in The Gambia, Mali, Guinea, and other countries.

=== Rites of passage ===
The Mandinka practice a rite of passage, kuyangwoo, which marks the beginning of adulthood for their children. At an age between four and fourteen, the youngsters have their genitalia ritually mutilated (see articles on male and female genital mutilation), in separate groups according to their sex. In years past, the children spent up to a year in the bush, but that has been reduced now to coincide with their physical healing time, between three and four weeks.

During this time, they learn about their adult social responsibilities and rules of behaviour. Preparation is made in the village or compound for the return of the children. A celebration marks the return of these new adults to their families. As a result of these traditional teachings, in marriage a woman's loyalty remains to her parents and her family; a man's to his.

==== Female genital mutilation ====
The women among the Mandinka people, like other ethnic groups near them, have traditionally practiced female genital mutilation (FGM), traditionally referred to as "female circumcision." According to UNICEF, the female genital mutilation prevalence rates among the Mandinka of The Gambia is the highest at over 96%, followed by FGM among the women of the Jola people at 91%, and Fula people at 88%.

Among the Mandinka women of some other countries of West Africa, the FGM prevalence rates are lower, but still range between 40% and 90%. This cultural practice, locally called Niaka or Kuyungo or Musolula Karoola or Bondo, involves the partial or total removal of the clitoris, or alternatively, the partial or total removal of the labia minora with the clitoris.

Some surveys, such as those by the Gambia Committee on Traditional Practices (GAMCOTRAP), estimate FGM is prevalent among 100% of the Mandinka in Gambia. In 2010, after community efforts of UNICEF and the local government bodies, several Mandinka women's organization pledged to abandon the female genital mutilation practices.

=== Marriage ===
Marriages are traditionally arranged by family members rather than by either the bride or groom. This practice is particularly prevalent in the rural areas. The suitor's family formally sends Kola nuts, a bitter nut from a tree, to the male elders of the bride-to-be. If they accept the nuts, the courtship may begin.

Polygamy has been practiced among the Mandinka since pre-Islamic days. A Mandinka man is legally allowed to have up to four wives, as long as he is able to care for each of them equally. Mandinka believe the crowning glory of any woman is the ability to produce children, especially sons. The first wife has authority over any subsequent wives. The husband has complete control over his wives and is responsible for feeding and clothing them. He also helps the wives' parents when necessary. Wives are expected to live together in harmony, at least superficially. They share work responsibilities of the compound, such as cooking, laundry, and other tasks.

=== Music ===
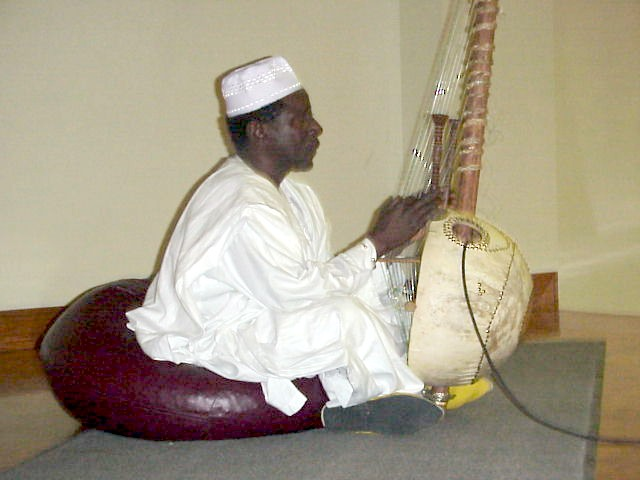
A Mandinka Griot Al-Haji Papa Susso performing songs from the oral tradition of The Gambia on the kora

Mandinka culture is rich in tradition, music, and spiritual ritual. The Mandinka continue a long oral history tradition through stories, songs, and proverbs. In rural areas, the influence of western education is minimal; the literacy rate in Latin script among these Mandinka is quite low. But, more than half the adult population can read the local Arabic script (including Mandinka Ajami). Small Qur'anic schools for children where this is taught are quite common. Mandinka children are given their name on the eighth day after their birth. The children are almost always named after a very important person in their family.

The Mandinka have a rich oral history that is passed down through sung versions by griots. This passing down of oral history through music has made the practice of music one of the most distinctive traits of the Mandinka. They have long been known for their drumming and also for their unique musical instrument, the kora. The kora is a twenty-one-stringed West African harp made from a halved, dried, hollowed-out gourd covered with cow or goat skin. The strings are made of fishing line (these were traditionally made from a cow's tendons). It is played to accompany a griot's singing or simply on its own.

A Mandinka religious and cultural site under consideration for World Heritage status is located in Guinea at Gberedou/Hamana.

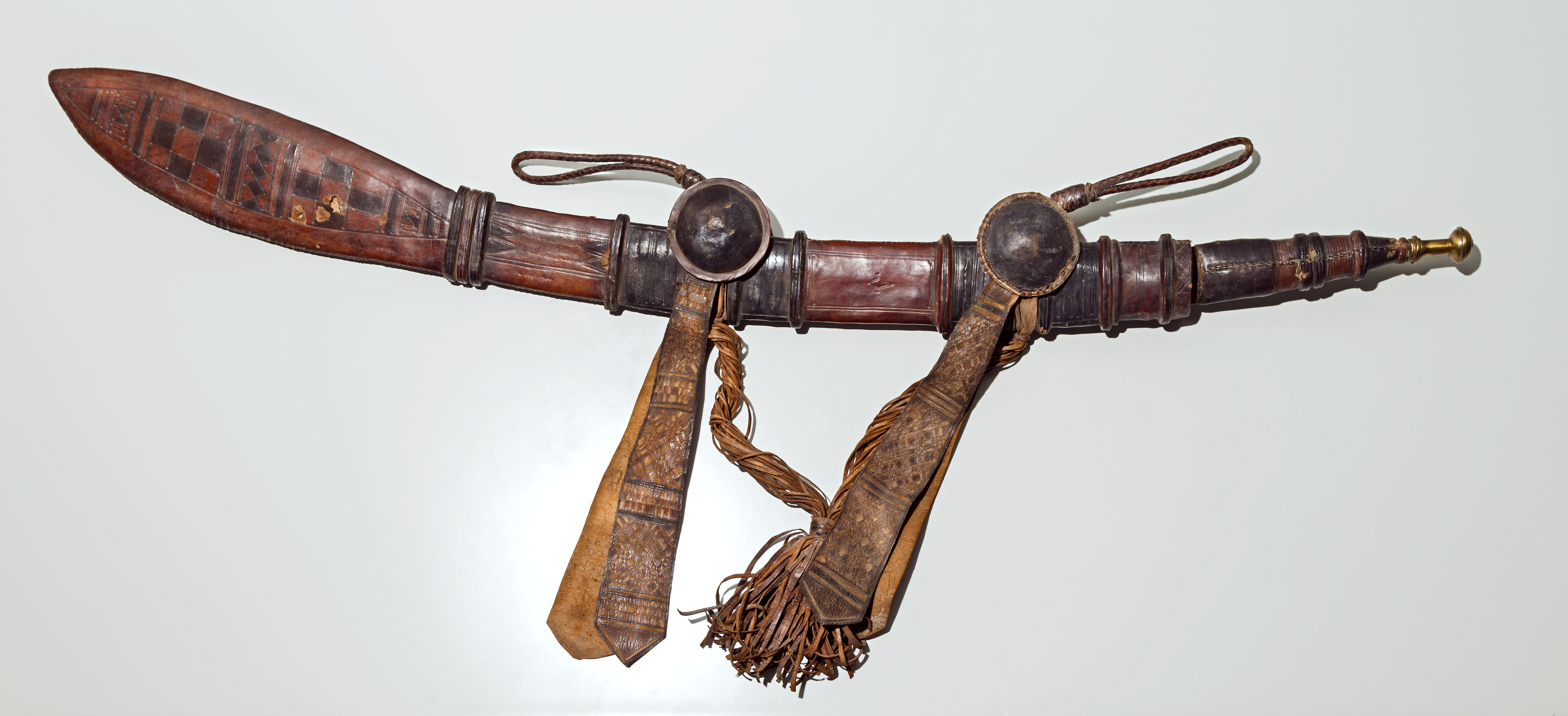
Mandinka saber, Gallieni collection MHNT

==== The kora ====
The kora has become the hallmark of traditional Mandinka musicians. The kora with its 21 strings is made from half a calabash, covered with cow's hide fastened on by decorative tacks. The kora has sound holes in the side which are used to store coins offered to the praise singers, in appreciation of their performance. The praise singers are called jalibaa or jalolu in Mandinka.

== In literature and other media ==
- Malian author Massa Makan Diabaté wrote novels that refer to Mandinka legends, including Janjon, which won the 1971 Grand prix littéraire d'Afrique noire. His novels The Lieutenant of Kouta, The Barber of Kouta and The Butcher of Kouta attempt to capture the proverbs and customs of the Mandinka people.
- In 1976 American writer Alex Haley published his novel Roots: The Saga of an American Family, tracing his family connections through free and enslaved generations to an 18th-century ancestor taken captive and brought to North America, a Mandinka man known as Kunta Kinte. In the course of his research, he traveled to West Africa and heard about his people from a griot. The book was on the New York Times bestseller list for many weeks and was also adapted as a popular TV mini-series. Many professional historians and at least one genealogist commented that this familial link was highly improbable (see D. Wright's The World And A Very Small Place).
- Martin R. Delany, a 19th-century abolitionist, military leader, politician and physician in the United States, was of partial Mandinka descent.
- Sinéad O'Connor's 1988 hit "Mandinka" was inspired by Alex Haley's book.
- Mr. T, of American television fame, once claimed that his distinctive hairstyle was modelled after a Mandinka warrior that he saw in National Geographic magazine. In his motivational video Be Somebody... or Be Somebody's Fool!, Mr. T states: "My folks came from Africa. They were from the Mandinka tribe. They wore their hair like this. These gold chains I wear symbolize the fact that my ancestors were brought over here as slaves." In a 2006 interview, he reiterated that he modeled his hair style after photographs of Mandinka men he saw in National Geographic.

== Notable people ==
=== Australia ===
- Mohamed Touré, Australian footballer

=== Burkina Faso ===
- Joffrey Bazié, Burkinabé footballer
- Amadou Coulibaly, Burkinabé footballer
- Djibril Ouattara
- Joseph Ki-Zerbo, political leader and historian
- Bakary Koné, Burkinabé footballer
- Cheick Kongo, Burkinabé mixed martial artist
- General Sangoulé Lamizana, former president 1966–1980
- Oumarou Nébié
- Gustavo Sangaré
- Dr. Lassina Zerbo, scientist and former prime minister
- Colonel Saye Zerbo, former President 1980–1982

=== The Gambia ===
- Francisco Menéndez (Black soldier),Afro-Spanish military leader and privateer.
- Adama Barrow, politician; third president of The Gambia since 2017
- Modou Barrow
- Musa Barrow
- Assan Ceesay
- Jatto Ceesay, footballer
- Ousainou Darboe, Foreign Minister of The Gambia
- Sheriff Mustapha Dibba, veteran politician and the First vice President of The Gambia
- Alieu Fadera
- Abdoulie Janneh, former UN under-secretary general
- Sidia Jatta, opposition politician
- Alhajj Sir Dawda Kairaba Jawara, first president of The Gambia
- Sona Jobarteh, first female kora artist (musician)
- Modou Jobe
- Jaliba Kuyateh, kora artist and celebrated musician in the Mandinka language
- Alasana Manneh
- Kekuta Manneh
- Yankuba Minteh
- Professor Lamin O. Sanneh, academician and author
- Abdoulie Sanyang
- Amadou Sanyang
- Ebrima Sohna
- Alagie Sosseh
- Foday Musa Suso, international musician.
- Mohamadou Sumareh
- Momodou Touray
- Saikou Touray

=== Guinea ===
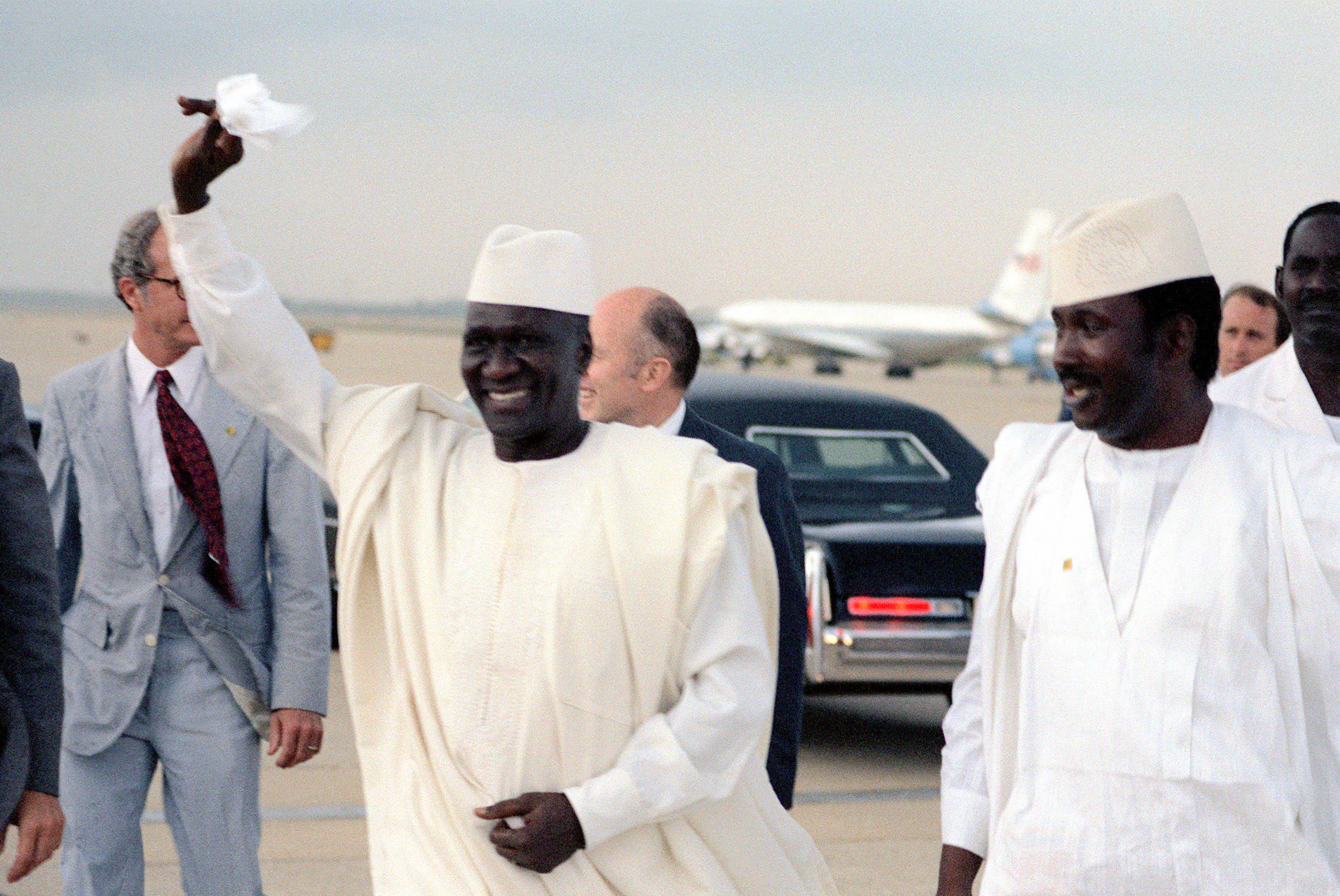
Ahmed Sékou Touré, the President of Guinea from 1958 to 1984

- Sekouba Bambino, Guinean musician
- Abdoul Camara
- Moussa Camara
- Ibrahima Cissé
- Momo Cissé
- Seydouba Cissé
- Alpha Condé, former Guinean President
- Cheick Condé
- Mamady Condé, Guinean foreign minister from 2004 to 2007
- Sékou Condé, Guinean footballer
- Sona Tata Condé, Guinean musician
- Vincent Coulibaly, Guinean archbishop of Conakry
- Amadou Diawara
- Djeli Moussa Diawara, Guinean musician (also known as Jali Musa Jawara - 32-stringed Kora player)
- Kaba Diawara, Guinean footballer
- Mamady Doumbouya, Guinean military officer
- Daouda Jabi, Guinean footballer
- Mamadi Kaba, Guinean footballer
- Sory Kaba, Guinean footballer
- Mamadou Kane
- Mory Kanté, Guinean kora musician
- Alhassane Keita, Guinean footballer
- Mamady Keïta, Guinean musician
- Naby Keita, Guinean footballer
- Kabiné Komara, former prime minister of Guinea
- Famoudou Konaté, Guinean musician
- Mory Konaté
- General Sékouba Konaté, former Head of State of Guinea
- Lansana Kouyaté, former prime minister of Guinea
- N'Faly Kouyate, Guinean musician
- Fodé Mansaré, Guinean footballer
- Petit Sory, Guinean footballer
- Morlaye Sylla
- Sekou Touré, President of Guinea from 1958 to 1984; grandson of Samory Touré
- Diarra Traoré, former prime minister of Guinea
- Samori Ture, founder of the Wassoulou Empire, an Islamic military state that resisted French rule in West Africa
- Mohamed Yattara

=== Guinea Bissau ===
- Aladje
- Yalany Baio, Bissau-Guinean footballer
- Mamadi Camará
- Romário Baró
- Mimito Biai, Bissau-Guinean footballer
- Sana Canté, Bissau-Guinean activist
- Rui Dabó, Bissau-Guinean footballer
- Tomás Dabó, Bissau-Guinean footballer
- João Jaquité, Bissau-Guinean footballer
- Jorginho
- Madi Queta, Bissau-Guinean footballer
- Neemias Queta, Bissau-Guinean basketball player
- Alfa Semedo
- Panutche Camará, Bissau-Guinean footballer

=== Ivory Coast ===
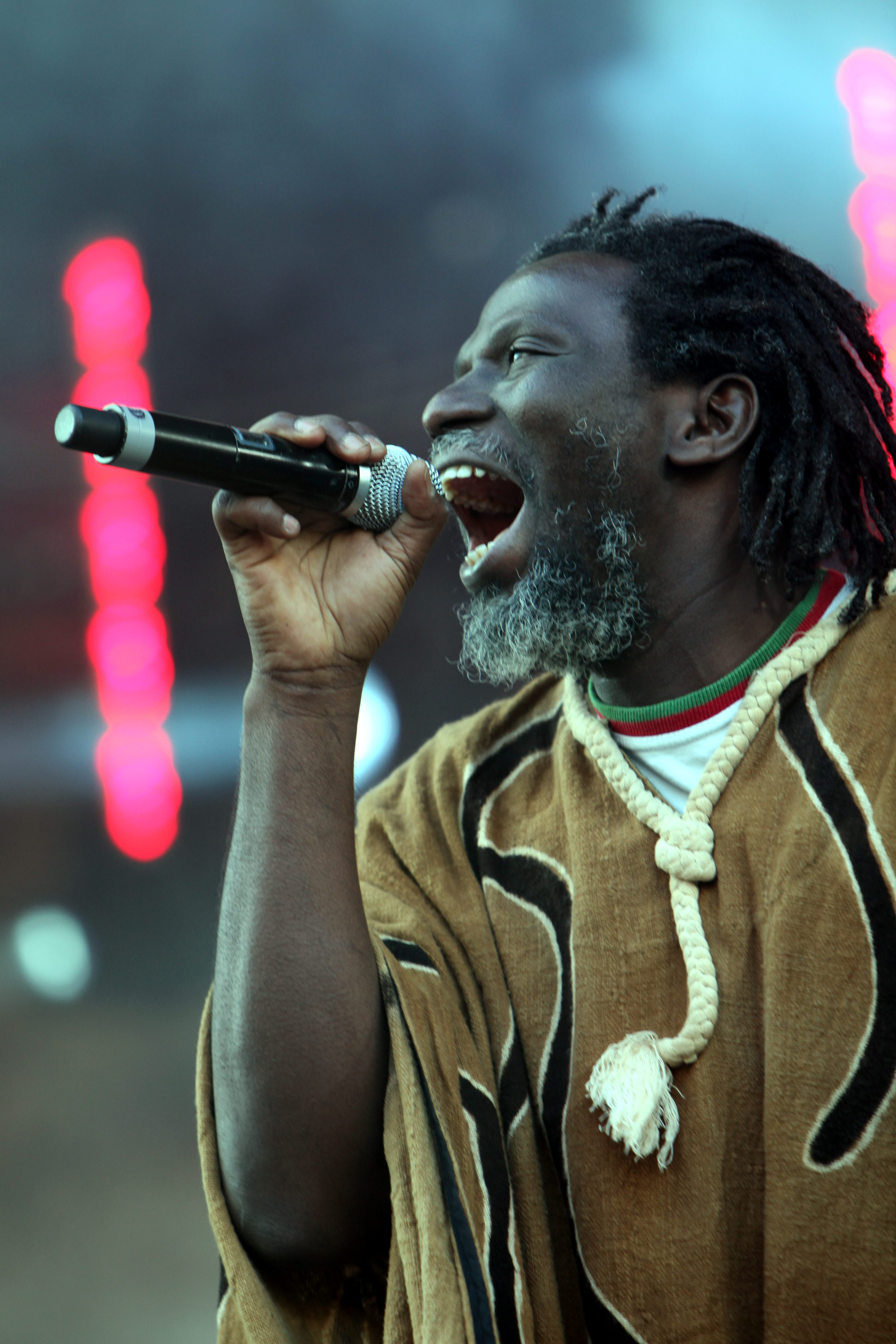
Tiken Jah Fakoly

- Sidiki Bakaba, Ivorian actor and filmmaker
- Jonathan Bamba, footballer
- Alpha Blondy, Ivorian (reggae) musician
- Ibrahim Cissé, Ivorian footballer
- Sekou Cissé, Ivorian footballer
- Fousseny Coulibaly, footballer
- Kafoumba Coulibaly, footballer
- Souleymane Coulibaly
- Siriki Dembélé, Ivorian footballer
- Henriette Diabaté, former Ivorian politician
- Oumar Diakité
- Ismaël Diomandé
- Sinaly Diomande, footballer
- Cheick Doukouré
- Emmanuel Eboué, footballer
- Tiken Jah Fakoly, Ivorian (reggae) musician
- Moryké Fofana
- Hassane Kamara, Ivorian Footballer
- Abdul Kader Keïta, Ivorian footballer
- Fadel Keïta
- Karim Konaté, footballer
- Arouna Koné, Ivorian footballer
- Bakari Koné, Ivorian footballer
- Moussa Koné
- Tiassé Koné, Ivorian footballer
- Ahmadou Kourouma, Ivorian writer
- Alassane Ouattara, Côte d'Ivoire president since 2010; Prime Minister of Côte d'Ivoire, 1990–1993
- Badra Ali Sangaré
- Ibrahim Sangaré
- Alpha Sissoko
- Guillaume Soro, Ivorian politician
- Kolo Touré, Ivorian footballer
- Sékou Touré Ivorian politician, environmental engineer, former UN Executive
- Yaya Touré, Ivorian footballer
- Abdou Razack Traoré
- Adama Traoré
- Hamed Traorè
- Lacina Traoré
- Marco Zoro, footballer

=== Liberia ===
- Prince Balde
- Momolu Dukuly, former Liberian foreign minister
- Abu Kamara
- Mohammed Kamara
- Nohan Kenneh
- Amara Mohamed Konneh, Minister of Finance
- G. V. Kromah, member of the defunct Liberian Council of State
- Alex Nimely
- Sylvanus Nimely
- Mohammed Sangare
- Ansu Toure

=== Mali ===
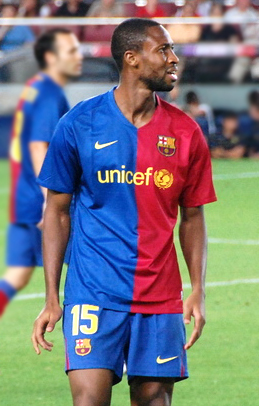
Seydou Keita in action for FC Barcelona in 2008

- Zoumana Camara
- Soumaila Coulibaly, Malian footballer
- Bako Dagnon, Malian female griot singer
- Souleymane Dembélé
- Cheick Diabaté, Malian footballer
- Massa Makan Diabaté, Malian historian, writer and playwright
- Mamadou Diabate, Malian musician
- Toumani Diabaté, Malian musician
- Drissa Diakité
- Yoro Diakité, former Malian prime minister
- Aboubacar Diarra
- Mahamadou Diarra
- Fatoumata Diawara, Malian musician
- Fousseni Diawara, Malian footballer
- Daba Diawara, Malian politician
- Moussa Djenepo
- Diaranké Fofana
- Youssouf Fofana
- Aoua Kéita, Malian politician and activist
- Ibrahim Boubacar Keïta, President of Mali, September 2013 – August 2020
- Habib Keïta
- Modibo Keïta, President of Mali from 1960 to 1968
- Salif Keita, Malian musician
- Seydou Keita, Malian footballer
- Sundiata Keita, founder of the Mali Empire
- Tiécoro Keita
- Amy Koita, Malian musician
- Ibrahima Konaté
- Pa Konate
- Sidy Koné
- Makan Konaté
- Moussa Kouyate, Malian musician
- Mansa Musa, (c. 1280 – c. 1337), the ninth, especially renowned, Mansa (emperor) of the Mali Empire
- Hadi Sacko
- Oumou Sangaré, Malian musician
- Djibril Sidibé, Malian footballer
- Mamady Sidibé, Malian footballer
- Modibo Sidibé, Prime Minister of Mali, 2007–2011
- Baba Sissoko, Malian musician
- Mohamed Sissoko, Malian footballer
- Adama Soumaoro
- Almamy Touré
- Amadou Toumani Touré, President of Mali from 2002 to 2012
- Birama Touré
- Adama Traoré
- Djimi Traoré
- Dramane Traoré
- Kalilou Traoré
- Mahamane Traoré
- Sidiki Diabaté

=== Senegal ===
- Brancou Badio
- Ibrahima Baldé
- Keita Baldé, Senegalese footballer
- Dawda Camara
- Lamine Camara
- Papa Demba Camara, Senegalese footballer
- Souleymane Camara
- Pathé Ciss
- Aliou Cissé, former Senegalese footballer
- Pape Abou Cissé
- Papiss Cissé, Senegalese footballer
- Aly Cissokho
- Issa Cissokho
- Abdou Diakhaté
- Pape Diakhaté
- Lamine Diatta
- Krépin Diatta, Senegalese footballer
- Souleymane Diawara, Senegalese footballer
- Baba Diawara
- Boukary Dramé, Senegalese footballer
- Lamine Gassama, Senegalese footballer
- Sidiki Kaba, Justice Minister of Senegal
- General Balla Keita, MiNUSCA Force Commander
- Seckou Keita, Senegalese musician
- Kalidou Koulibaly
- Moussa Konaté, Senegalese footballer
- Cheikhou Kouyaté, Senegalese footballer
- Moustapha Mbow
- Opa Nguette, Senegalese footballer
- Amadou Onana
- Abdoulaye Sané
- Lamine Sané, Senegalese footballer
- Boubakary Soumaré
- Tony Sylva
- Amara Traoré, former Senegalese footballer
- Aminata Touré, former prime minister of Senegal
- Zargo Touré, Senegalese footballer

=== Sierra Leone ===
- Amadou Bakayoko
- Ibrahim Jaffa Condeh, Sierra Leonean journalist and news anchor
- Kanji Daramy, journalist and spokesman for former Sierra Leone's president Ahmad Tejan Kabbah. He is also the former chairman of Sierra Leone National Telecommunications Commission
- Mabinty Daramy, current Sierra Leone's deputy minister of trade and industry
- Mohamed B. Daramy, former minister of development and economic planning from 2002 to 2007, former ECOWAS commissioner of income tax
- Kemoh Fadika, current Sierra Leone's high commissioner to the Gambia and former high commissioner to Nigeria, former ambassador to Egypt and Iran.
- Lansana Fadika, Sierra Leonean businessman and former SLPP chairman for the Western Area. He is the younger brother of Kemoh Fadika
- Saidu Fofanah
- Bomba Jawara, former MP of Sierra Leone from Koinadugu District (SLPP)
- Ahmad Tejan Kabbah, President of Sierra Leone from 1996 to 2007
- Haja Afsatu Kabba, former Sierra Leone's Minister of Marine Resources and Fisheries; Energy and Power; Lands
- Karamoh Kabba, Sierra Leonean author, writer and journalist
- Mohamed Kakay, former MP of Sierra Leone from Koinadugu District (SLPP)
- Alhaji Kamara
- Glen Kamara
- Musa Noah Kamara
- Saidu Bah Kamara
- Kadijatu Kebbay, Sierra Leonean model; Miss University Sierra Leone 2006 winner and representative of Sierra Leone at the Miss World 2006 contest
- Brima Dawson Kuyateh, journalist and the current president of the Sierra Leone Reporters Union
- Sidique Mansaray, Sierra Leonean footballer
- Tejan Amadu Mansaray, former MP of Sierra Leone representing Koinadugu District (APC)
- Shekuba Saccoh, former Sierra Leone's ambassador to Guinea and former Minister of Social Welfare
- K-Man (born Mohamed Saccoh), Sierra Leonean musician
- Alhaji A. B. Sheriff, former MP from Koinadugu District (SLPP)
- Sheka Tarawalie, Sierra Leonean journalist and former State House Press Secretary to president Koroma. Former Deputy Minister of Information and current Deputy Minister of Internal Affairs.
- Mohamed Buya Turay
- Sitta Umaru Turay, Sierra Leonean journalist

=== Togo ===
- Mohamed Kader Toure
- Assimiou Touré

=== United States ===
- Aboubacar Keita
- Mo Bamba, professional basketball player
- Martin Delany, abolitionist, journalist, physician and writer (had two Mandinka grandparents brought to America as slaves)
- Alex Haley, writer, author of the 1976 book Roots: The Saga of an American Family
- Kunta Kinte, documented captured Mandinka warrior during the last years of the Atlantic slave trade. He is Alex Haley's ancestor and the key character in Haley's book Roots, and is also portrayed in the record-breaking TV miniseries Roots.
- Gabourey Sidibe, actress
- Foday Musa Suso, griot musician and composer
- Sheck Wes, rapper and professional basketball player.

== See also ==
- Djembe
- Gravikord
- Mande languages
- Mandingo people of Sierra Leone
- Mane people
- N'Ko alphabet
