= Mandingo people of Sierra Leone =

Mandé ethnic group in Sierra Leone

Mandinka of Sierra Leone
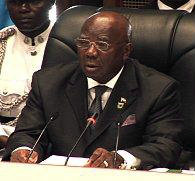
- Ahmad Tejan Kabbah, the president of Sierra Leone from 1996 to 2007, was an ethnic Mandingo

Total population
- 360,080

Languages
- Maninka, Krio

Religion
- Sunni Islam (over 99%)

Related ethnic groups
- Bambara, Konyake

Mandingo people of Sierra Leone (commonly referred to as the Mandinka, Mandingo or Malinke) is a major ethnic group in Sierra Leone and a branch of the Mandinka people of West Africa. The Mandinka people of Sierra Leone are the direct descendants of the Mandinka people from Guinea. The Mandingo first settled in what is now Sierra Leone from Guinea over 650 years ago as farmers, traders and Islamic clerics in the time of the Mali Empire, a Mandinka ruling West African Islamic empire. About 500 years later, Beginning in the late 1870s to the 1890s under the rule of prominent Mandinka Muslim cleric Samori Ture, an even larger group of Mandingo immigrated from Eastern Guinea settled in northeastern Sierra Leone on lands conquered by the Mandinka Muslim ruler Samori Toure as part of the Wassoulou Empire (in the modern nation of Guinea).

The Mandingo are partly responsible for the spread of Islam in Sierra Leone. The Mandingo people of Sierra Leone have a very close friendly and allied relationship with their neighbors the Mandingo people of Guinea and Liberia, as they share almost identical Mandinka dialect, tradition, culture and food.

The Mandingo constitute about 5% of Sierra Leone's population. Like the larger Mandinka people, the Sierra Leonean Mandingo are virtually all Muslims at over 99% and they follow the Sunni branch of Islam based on the Maliki Jurisprudence, largely influence by Sufi tradition of Islam. Islam is the center of the religious and cultural practices of the Mandinka. The Mandingo are well known for their conservative Islamic tradition.

The Mandingo people of Sierra Leone are historically predominantly traders and rural subsistence farmers. The most famous Mandingo from Sierra Leone is Ahmad Tejan Kabbah, the president of Sierra Leone from 1996 to 2007.

Other famous Mandingo from Sierra Leone include Sierra Leone former vice president Sorie Ibrahim Koroma, current Sierra Leone first lady Fatima Maada Bio, and former chairman of the Sierra Leone national electoral commission Mohamed Nfa Alie Conteh.

The Mandingo people of Sierra Leone speak the Maninka language as their native language. The Mandingo dialect of Sierra Leone is Virtually identical to the Mandingo dialect of Guinea and Liberia. Like other Sierra Leonean ethnic groups, the overwhelming majority of the Mandingo people in Sierra Leone also speak the Krio language, the de facto national language of Sierra Leone.

== History ==
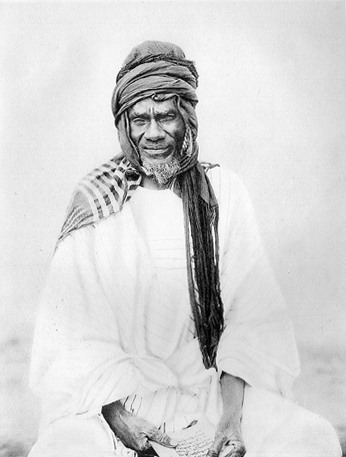
Samori with the Qur'an in his hands

In 1875, Samori Ture, an ultra conservative hardline Muslim cleric and Mandinka leader in Guinea, imported breech-loading rifles through the British colony Sierra Leone and supplied his warriors with them. By 1876, his Mandinka warriors had enslaved many African Tribes within the region, including the Limba led by Almamy Suluku and had conquered a large territory in Limba areas in northern Sierra Leone (present day Koinadugu and Kambia District). The Mandinka warriors moved into the northeastern part of British colony Sierra Leone, where they occupied lands of the local indigenous Temne and Loko people.

Ture took the title of Imam, chief of all Believers. By late 1876, the Mandinka warriors had occupied a large section in northeastern Sierra Leone, possibly due to wars with France and intentions to spread the teachings of Islam.

Samori Ture established Islamic rule in parts of Northeastern Sierra Leone under his control, as part of the Wassoulou. He founded many Islamic Madrassa schools based on the Suffi tradition of the Maliki school within Sunni Islam. Ture ordered the local Sierra Leonean people, who were living under the Mandinka control territory in Northeastern Sierra Leone to abandon their animist beliefs and to convert to Islam or they must pay a tax known as Jizya for not converting to Islam.

Samori Ture brought many ethnic Mandinka marabout Sunni Muslims clerics from the Sufi tradition of Islam from Guinea to Northeastern Sierra Leone to teach the Quran and the life of the Islamic Prophet Muhammad. Ture banned some indigenous practices by the local Sierra Leone people that he viewed as un Islamic. Ture also imposed an Islamic dress code in Northeast Sierra Leone under his rule. Although most part of Northern Sierra Leone had been Muslim even before Samori's conquest, a minority of the local Sierra Leonean people under Samori Ture's rule were not Muslims at the time. But faced with the powers of the new hardline Muslim rulers, they abandoned their animist beliefs and converted to Islam. Many of the local peoples joined the Mandinka in enrolling in the Islamic Madrassa schools established by Samori Ture. Within a short period of time after Ture conquered part of northern Sierra Leone, part of the region, once dominated by Indigenous religion, rapidly became an overwhelmingly Muslim majority, and has remained an overwhelmingly Muslim majority to present.

In 1878, Ture sent thousands of Mandinka people from the Wassoulou in central Guinea to Mandinka-occupied northeastern Sierra Leone as traders, farmers, and settlers to colonize the area. By late 1878, the Mandinka population had tripled in British-controlled Sierra Leone.

By the late 19th century, many of the Mandinka had begun to have large families. And by 1900, most of the Mandinka population in Sierra Leone were first generation Sierra Leonean born. The British government considered the Sierra Leonean born Mandinka as citizens of the colony of Sierra Leone by birth. The British called them Mandingo. While they were concentrated in the North and East, the Mandinka traders and businesspeople also settled in the capital Freetown. Since the late eighteenth century, it had been dominated by the Krio people, an ethnic group made up of descendants of black colonists from Great Britain and Nova Scotia, and slaves liberated from ships by the British Navy. The settlers from Nova Scotia were mostly freed United States slaves, known as Black Loyalists, who were resettled in Nova Scotia after the American Revolutionary War. Many had left rebel masters and joined the British to gain freedom.

== Politics ==
The Mandingo have played an important role in the politics of Sierra Leone. The Mandingo have traditionally supported the Sierra Leone People's Party (SLPP), which ruled the country as recently as 2007. Sierra Leone's third president Ahmad Tejan Kabbah, who is ethnic Mandingo, was very popular in the Mandingo community across Sierra Leone during his presidency. During Kabba's administration, the Mandingo enjoyed strong influence in the government and the civil service.

- Alhaji Ahmad Tejan Kabbah, President of Sierra Leone from 1996 to 2007
- Sorie Ibrahim Koroma, Vice president of Sierra Leone (1971 to 1985)
- Alhaji Chief A.MucktarruKallay, First chairman and Leader of the All Peoples Congress (APC) Mar-Oct1960.
- Usman Boie Kamara, an ethnic Mandingo, ran unsuccessfully for the SLPP presidential candidate in the 2012 Sierra Leone presidential election. He finished second, after the former military ruler Julius Maada Bio, who won the SLPP nomination at the party's convention held on 31 July 2011 at the Miatta Hall in Freetown.

Under the current Sierra Leone government of president Ernest Bai Koroma of the All People's Congress (APC), serving since 20xx (year), several prominent Mandingo have been appointed to senior government and civil service positions. These include deputy Minister of Finance, Mabinty Daramy; Ambassador to the Gambia Mohamed Kemoh Fadika; and Minister of Mines, Mineral Resources Minkailu Mansaray;

== Culture ==
Mandingo culture is rich in tradition, music, and spiritual ritual. Mandingo continue a long oral history tradition through griots, who tell stories, songs and proverbs. This passing down of oral history through music has made music one of the most distinctive traits of the Mandinka. In rural areas, western education's impact is minimal; the literacy rate in Latin script among these Mandinka is quite low. But, more than half the adult population can read the Arabic script used locally; small Qur'anic schools for children are quite common.

The Mandingo have long been known for their drumming and also for their unique musical instrument, the kora. The kora is a 21-stringed guitar-like instrument made out of a halved, dried, hollowed-out gourd covered with cow or goat skin. The strings are made of fishing line. It is played with traditional songs to accompany a dying person into the meaning of death, so the deceased can go in peace to the phantom place.

== Customs ==
Most Mandinka live in family-related compounds in traditional rural villages. Mandinka villages are fairly autonomous and self-ruled, being led by a council of upper-class elders and a chief who functions as a first among equals.

=== Marriage ===
Family members traditionally arrange marriages between prospective spouses. This practice is particularly prevalent in the rural areas. The suitor's family sends kola nuts, a bitter nut from a tree, to the male elders of the bride-to-be. If the gift is accepted, the courtship begins. The Mandinka have practiced polygamy since pre-Islamic days. A Mandinka man is legally allowed to have up to four wives, as long as he is able to care for each of them equally.

Mandinka believe the crowning glory of any woman is the ability to produce children, especially sons. The first wife has authority over any subsequent wives. The husband has complete control over his wives and is responsible for feeding and clothing them. He also helps the wives' parents when necessary. Wives are expected to live together in harmony, at least superficially. They share work responsibilities of the compound, cooking, laundry, etc.

=== Passage into adulthood ===
Mandingo children are named on the seventh day after their birth, and are almost always named after a very important person in their family. The Mandinka practise rites of passage to mark the beginning of adulthood for their children.

At an age between four and fourteen, the children of each gender are subjected to ritual cutting of genitalia (see articles on male and female genital cutting), in separate groups according to their gender. In years past, the boys spent up to a year in the bush, but that has been reduced to coincide with their physical healing time. It is now generally between three and four weeks. The children who have been through the ritual together form a special, internal bond, one which remains throughout life.

During this time, the children of each gender are taught about their adult social responsibilities and rules of behaviour by elders of the same gender, who become their lifelong sponsors. They learn secret songs about being Mandinka. These songs teach them how they are to relate to members of the opposite sex, including their parents, their siblings, their relatives, and eventually their spouses, as well as their elders and their peers.

Great preparation is made in the village or compound for the return of the children. A huge celebration marks the return of the new adults to their families. The children are given new clothes and treated with new respect by their elders. Boys and girls are honoured with a dance. Tradition teaches children that, even after marriage, a woman's loyalty remains to her parents and her family; a man's to his.

== Religious and spiritual beliefs ==
In the early 21st century, more than 99% of Mandinka are Muslim. Logon, Roberta A. (May 2007). "Sundiata of mali". Calliope. 17 (9): 34–38.Quinn, Charlotte A.; Quinn, Charlotte A. (December 1973). "Mandingo Kingdoms of the Senegambia: Traditionalism, Islam and European Expansion". The American Historical Review. 78 (5). American Historical Association: 1506–1507. doi:10.2307/1854194. JSTOR 1854194. Many Mandinkas children, particularly those in the rural areas who attend madrassas, learn to recite chapters of the Qu'ran in Arabic.

Most Mandinka continue to practise a mix of Islam and traditional animist practices. They believe that the spirits can be controlled only through the power of a marabout, who knows the protective formulas. No important decision is made without first consulting the marabout. Marabouts, who also have Islamic training, write Qu'ranic verses on slips of paper and sew them into leather pouches. They sell them as protective amulets, which are bought and worn by men, women and children. The few Mandinka who have converted to Christianity are often viewed as traitors by the others. Often communities drive out converts from the compound and village; they are rejected by their families.

== Economy ==
Mandinka are rural subsistence farmers who rely on groundnuts, rice, millet, and small-scale husbandry for their livelihood. The oldest male is the head of the family. Small mud houses with conical thatch or tin roofs make up their villages, which are organized on the basis of clan groups of related individuals. During the rainy season men plant peanuts as their main cash crop; peanuts are also a staple of the Mandinka diet. Men also plant millet and corn, mostly for family consumption. Women work in the rice fields, tending the plants by hand. This is extremely labour-intensive and physically demanding work. Only about 50% of the rice consumption needs are met by local planting; the rest is imported from Asia and the United States. While farming is the predominant profession among the Mandinka, men also work as tailors, butchers, taxi drivers, woodworkers, metalworkers, soldiers, nurses, and extension workers for aid agencies. However, most women, probably 95%, remain in the home as wives and mothers because their labor is integral to the survival of families.

== Notable people ==
=== Politicians ===
- Alhaji Ahmad Tejan Kabbah, President of Sierra Leone from 1996 to 2007
- Sorie Ibrahim Koroma, Vice president of Sierra Leone (1971 to 1985)
- Alhaji Chief Mucktarru-Kallay, former Chairman of the All Peoples Congress(APC)
- Sheku Bockarie Kawusu-Konte, former minister of Mines, Lands and Labour,former Minister of Trade and Industry, former Acting Prime Minister of Sierra Leone, former Ambassador to China, first Organizing Secretary of the APC and founding member of the All Peoples Congress party.
- Usman Boie Kamara, former Sierra Leone minister of trade
- Ibrahim Kanja Sesay, current Sierra Leone minister of Energy, and former commissioner of the Sierra Leone National Commission for Social Action (NaCSA)
- Kanji Daramy, former spokesman for former Sierra Leone's president Ahmad Tejan Kabbah.
- Mabinty Daramy, former Sierra Leone's Deputy Minister of Finance& Economic Development
- Shekuba Saccoh, former Sierra Leone's ambassador to Guinea
- Mohamed Fode Dabo, former Sierra Leone Ambassador to Belgium
- Alhaji Mohamed Kakay, former member of parliament of Sierra Leone from Koinadugu District (SLPP).
- Isata Jabbie Kabbah, Sierra Leonean National Women's Leader of the SLPP and wife of former Sierra Leone's president Ahmad Tejan Kabbah

=== Journalists ===
- Sheka Tarawalie, Sierra Leonean journalist and writer
- Ibrahim Jaffa Condeh, Sierra Leonean journalist and news anchor
- Sitta Umaru Turay, Sierra Leonean journalist
- Karamoh Kabba, Sierra Leonean author, writer
- Brima Dawson Kuyateh, Sierra Leonean journalist and the current president of the Sierra Leone Reporters Union
- Jarrah Kawusu-Konte, former Director of Communications, Office of the President, State House.
- Abdulai Bayraytay, former Presidential Spokesman

=== Football stars and entertainers ===
- Khalifa Jabbie, Sierra Leone footballer
- Sidique Mansaray, Sierra Leonean football star
- K-Man (born Mohamed Saccoh), musician
- Steady Bongo, (born Lansana Sheriff), musician
- Kadijatu Kebbay, model; won Miss University Sierra Leone 2006 and represented the country at the Miss World 2006 contest.
- Lansana Baryoh, football star
- Brima Keita, football manager
