= Daramy =

Daramy (surname) is a common surname among the Mandinka people of West Africa, and may refer to:

- Kanji Daramy, Sierra Leonean journalist and spokesman for former Sierra Leone's president Ahmad Tejan Kabbah from 2002 to 2007
- Mabinty Daramy, Sierra Leone's deputy foreign minister
- Mohamed Daramy, Danish football player for Stade de Reims
- Mohamed B. Daramy, Sierra Leone minister of Trade and industry from 2002 to 2007
