= LGBTQ rights in Sierra Leone =

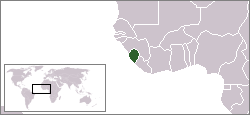
- Sierra Leone
- Legal status: Male illegal since 1861 (as Colony of Sierra Leone). Female always legal.
- Penalty: Life imprisonment.
- Gender identity: No
- Military: No
- Discrimination protections: Sexual orientation protections in employment.

Family rights
- Recognition of relationships: No
- Adoption: No

Lesbian, gay, bisexual, and transgender (LGBT) people in Sierra Leone face legal challenges not experienced by non-LGBTQ residents. Male same-sex sexual activity (whether in public or private) is illegal in Sierra Leone and carries a possible penalty of life imprisonment (with hard labor), although this law is seldom enforced.

In 2011, Sierra Leone was one of five African countries to join the United Nations' "Joint Statement on Ending Acts of Violence Related Human Rights Violations Based on Sexual Orientation and Gender Identity", which called for an end to "acts of violence, criminal sanctions and related human rights violations committed against individuals because of their sexual orientation or gender identity".

Since 2023, the Employment Act (2023) bans discrimination based on sexual orientation.

== Law regarding same-sex sexual activity ==
Male same-sex sexual activity is illegal under Section 61 of the Offences against the Person Act 1861, and imprisonment for life is possible. Female same-sex sexual activity is legal.

Sodomy ... : Whosoever shall be convicted of the abominable crime of buggery, committed ... with mankind ... , shall be liable..... to be kept in penal servitude for life.

This law was colonial inheritance from the British Empire.

In 2011, Sierra Leone was one of five African countries to join the United Nations' "Joint Statement on Ending Acts of Violence Related Human Rights Violations Based on Sexual Orientation and Gender Identity", which called for an end to "acts of violence, criminal sanctions and related human rights violations committed against individuals because of their sexual orientation or gender identity".

== Recognition of same-sex relationships ==
There is no recognition of same-sex relationships.

== Adoption and family planning ==
According to the U.S. Department of State, "A single male may not adopt a child unless there are exceptional circumstances or the child is a son of the prospective adoptive father. Only married couples may adopt jointly."

== Discrimination protections ==
The Sierra Leone constitution does not protect against discrimination based on sexual orientation or gender identity.

The Sierra Leone Human Rights Commission does not work on LGBT rights because, according to its communications director in 2011, "the law of Sierra Leone does not give the Commission mandate to advocate and support LGBT human rights".

The Employment Act (2023) bans discrimination based on "sexuality" and unfair dismissal based on an employee’s sexual orientation (92.1.f).

Section 9.29(b) of the Sierra Leone Civil Aviation Regulation, issued in 2024, states that "the State shall not use Passenger Name Record data revealing an individual’s racial or ethnic origin, political opinions, religious or philosophical beliefs, trade union membership or data concerning their health, sexual life or sexual orientation, other than in exceptional and immediate circumstances to protect the vital interests of the data subject or of another natural person. In circumstances where such information is transferred, The State shall delete such data as soon as practicable."

== Living conditions ==
According to a report filed by the U.S. embassy in Sierra Leone in 2011,

Many Sierra Leoneans believe that homosexuality is practiced exclusively by, or through inducements from, foreigners -- it is assumed that homosexuals are either copying Western practices, or motivated by economics. A number of Sierra Leoneans, even those with considerable exposure to Western culture, said that homosexuality does not exist locally, and any cases were due directly to Western influence. ... The few Sierra Leoneans who admitted knowing someone they believed to be homosexual said that in no case would anyone openly admit it, and if they did, they would be shunned by their families and friends and possibly threatened by community members. ... While societal stigmas keep homosexuality in the closet, there are no "witch hunts" demanding tougher legislation or enforcement of the 1861 law, either, and this in a country where communities do have actual witch hunts.

Politicians, political parties, and other political organizations in Sierra Leone avoid making public statements on LGBT rights or come out in opposition to them on religious grounds. Members of the LGBT community in Sierra Leone began to campaign for LGBT rights in 2002, with the creation of the Dignity Association.

In 2004, FannyAnn Eddy was murdered. She was the founder of the first LGBT rights organization in Sierra Leone, the Sierra Leone Lesbian and Gay Association. According to initial reports, several men brutally raped and murdered her at her office. Many human rights activists believed that she was targeted for being gay and because of her work on behalf of women and the LGBT community. The criminal investigation division of the Sierra Leone police force, however, said in 2005 that there was no evidence of sexual violence and that the murder could not be blamed on homophobia. The person charged with the murder was a "disgruntled janitorial worker whom Ms. Eddy had fired weeks prior to the murder" and who was reported to have "threatened to take revenge" on her.

In 2011, the government, through the National AIDS/HIV Control Program (NACP), conducted its first ever study of men who have sex with other men (MSM). The study found that although society may be very quick to label these men as "gay", many of them do not connect their sexual practices with being "gay", instead insisting on a heterosexual identity. The study also found that having multiple male sexual partners and bisexuality are very common among MSM. The HIV infection rate among MSM was 7.5 percent, more than five times the national HIV prevalence, "which means that MSM communities are important drivers of [the] HIV epidemic in the country. MSM are mostly found to have concurrent sexual relationships with the opposite sex. This enables a cycle of HIV transmission in the most likely occurrence of multiple sexual partnering. This is a great threat to public health in general and has become a priority concern of [the National HIV/Aids Secretariat of Sierra Leone] ... and NACP. High HIV prevalence amongst MSM cannot be blamed on their sexual practices per se."

British Prime Minister David Cameron said in October 2011 that the United Kingdom may withhold aid from countries that do not recognise LGBT rights. In response, Deputy Information Minister Sheka Tarawalie told the news media in November 2011 that "it is not possible that we will legalise same sex marriages as they run counter to our culture". The president of the Methodist Church in Sierra Leone, Bishop Arnold Temple, said, "The church in Sierra Leone will do everything possible to protect democracy but our values will not accept the call from ... Mr Cameron for countries in the Commonwealth ... to accept the practice of lesbianism and gayism. We call on the government ... to inform the British leader that such practices are unacceptable and we condemn it totally. Africa should not be seen as a continent in need to be influenced by the demonic threat as our values are totally different."

The U.S. Department of State's 2012 Human Rights Report found:

A law from 1861 prohibits male homosexual acts ("buggery" and "crimes against nature"); however, there is no legal prohibition against female-to-female sex. The 1861 law carries a penalty of life imprisonment for "indecent assault" upon a man or 10 years for attempting such an assault. However, the law was not enforced in practice. During the country's Universal Periodic Review before the UN Human Rights Council in May 2011, the attorney general told the Working Group that all persons in the country would be protected regardless of their sexual orientation. However, the government subsequently rejected three of 129 Working Group recommendations, two calling for decriminalizing all sexual activity between consulting adults and one calling for legislation to prohibit discrimination based on sexual orientation and gender identity. Despite the lack of enforcement of the 1861 law, police continued to harass, detain, beat, and denounce persons perceived to be members of the LGBT community. Men dressed as women were singled out for detention, harassment, and public humiliation but were not formally charged with any crime or misdemeanor. A few organizations, including DignitySL and the local chapter of Why Can't We Get Married.com, worked to support LGBT persons, but they maintained very low profiles. Gay pride parades and other public displays of solidarity could not safely take place. Social discrimination based on sexual orientation occurred in nearly every facet of life for known gays and lesbians, and many chose to have heterosexual relationships and family units to shield them. In the areas of employment and education, sexual orientation was the basis for abusive treatment, which led individuals to leave their jobs or courses of study. It was difficult for gay men and lesbians to receive health services due to fear that their confidentiality rights would be ignored if they were honest about their ailments; many chose not to be tested or treated for sexually transmitted infections. Secure housing was also a problem for LGBT persons. The families of LGBT persons frequently shunned their gay children, leading some children to turn to prostitution to survive. Adults could lose their leases if their sexual orientation became public. Lesbian girls and women were also victims of "planned rapes" that were initiated by family members in an effort to change their sexual orientation. Religious groups reportedly promoted discrimination against the LGBT community.

== Summary table ==
Same-sex sexual activity legal	No Male illegal. (Penalty: Life imprisonment); Yes Female always legal.
Equal age of consent	No
Anti-discrimination laws in employment only	Yes (Since 2023)
Anti-discrimination laws in the provision of goods and services	No
Anti-discrimination laws in all other areas (Incl. indirect discrimination, hate speech)	No
Same-sex marriages	No
Recognition of same-sex couples	No
Step-child adoption by same-sex couples	No
Joint adoption by same-sex couples	No
Gays and lesbians allowed to serve openly in the military	No
Right to change legal gender	No
Access to IVF for lesbians	No
Commercial surrogacy for gay male couples	No
MSMs allowed to donate blood	No

== See also ==
- Human rights in Sierra Leone
- LGBT rights in Africa
- Human rights in Africa
