= Brima (name) =

Brima or Brimah is an African name that may refer to the following people:

Given name

- Brima Bangura (born 1981), Sierra Leonean football goalkeeper
- Brima Dawson Kuyateh, Sierra Leonean journalist
- Brima Kamara (disambiguation) – multiple people
- Brimah Kebbie (born 1965), English rugby league and rugby union player of Sierra Leonean descent
- Brima Koroma (born 1984), Sierra Leonean footballer
- Brima Pepito (born 1985), Sierra Leonean footballer
- Brimah Razak (born 1987), Ghanaian footballer
- Brima Sesay (1981–2009), Sierra Leonean football goalkeeper

Surname

- Amida Brimah (born 1994), Ghanaian basketball player
- Alex Tamba Brima (1971–2016), Sierra Leonean military commander
