= Fadika =

Fadika is both a given name and a surname. Notable people with the name include:

- Fadika Kramo-Lanciné (born 1948), Ivorian film director
- Fadika Sarra Sako, Ivorian politician
- Kemoh Fadika, Sierra Leonean diplomat
- Lansana Fadika, Sierra Leonean businessman
