= Lansana =

Lansana is a given name. Notable people with the name include:

Surname:

- Alpha Lansana (born 1980), Sierra Leonean international footballer
- David Lansana (1922–1975), appointed army commander of Sierra Leone in 1964
- Komeh Gulama Lansana, the widow of Brigadier David Lansana, former Commander of the Sierra Leone Armed Forces

Given name:

- Lansana Baryoh (born 1987), Sierra Leonean international footballer
- Lansana Conté (1934–2008), the President of Guinea from 3 April 1984 until his death on 22 December 2008
- Lansana Fadika, Sierra Leonean international businessman, youth activist and politician
- Lansana Kouyaté (born 1950), Guinean diplomat and political figure who served as Prime Minister of Guinea from 2007 to 2008
- Louis Lansana Beavogui (1923–1984), Guinean politician
