= Balla Keita =

Balla Keita may refer to:

- Balla Moussa Keïta (1934–2001), Malian actor and comedian
- Balla Keita (Lieutenant General), United Nations Force Commander
