= Massa Makan Diabaté =

Malian historian, author, and playwright (1938–1988)

- Born: June 12, 1938; Kita, Mali
- Died: January 27, 1988 (aged 49)
- Occupations: Historian; author; playwright
- Awards: Grand prix littéraire d'Afrique noire Grand prix international de la Fondation Léopold Sédar Senghor

Massa Makan Diabaté (June 12, 1938 – January 27, 1988) was a Malian historian, author, and playwright.

== Biography ==
Born in 1938 in Kita, Mali, Massa Makan Diabaté was the descendant of a long line of West African poets (griots). His uncle, Kélé Monson Diabaté, was considered a master griot, and Massa Makan Diabaté once said that he owed much to his uncle's teaching: "I am what Kèlè Monson wanted me to be when he initiated me into the Malinké oral tradition. And I'll say that I betrayed him by writing novels. I'm the child of Kélé Monson, but a traitorous child." Diabaté began training as a griot at the age of seven, though his training would later be interrupted to allow him to study in Guinea. He eventually moved to Paris, France, where he studied history, sociology, and political science, before working for a number of international organisations such as UNICEF or UNESCO.

Returning to Mali, Diabaté settled into an administrative post in Bamako. His early works – Janjon et autres chants populaires du Mali (Janjon and other popular songs of Mali, 1970), Kala Jata (1970), and L'aigle et l'épervier ou la geste du Soundjata (The Eagle and the Sparrowhawk or the Gest/Epic of Soundjata, 1975) – were French-language versions of Malinké epics and folktales. In 1971, Janjon was awarded the Grand prix littéraire d'Afrique noire, bringing Diabaté his first international recognition. His trilogy of novels Le lieutenant, Le coiffeur, and Le boucher de Kouta (The Lieutenant, The Barber, and The Butcher of Kouta, 1979–1982) won the 1987 Grand prix international de la Fondation Léopold Sédar Senghor.

Massa Makan Diabaté died in Bamako on January 27, 1988. The Malian government has named two high schools after him, one in Bamako and the other in his home region of Kayes.

== Redefining and reclaiming the griot ==
Although a griot himself, Diabaté came to see his contemporaries as parasites and beggars who often perverted history and abused their roles in pursuit of wealth: "After Mali's independence, griots became, in my opinion, what I would a call a parasite." The state of griots was a key theme in his work. In L'assemblée des djinns, he elucidates his concerns through one of his characters:

"The griots died before the arrival of the Whites, when our kings, instead of uniting against a common danger, tore each other to shreds. Today's griots are nothing more than public entertainers who sing the praises of just about anybody… Chief of the Griots!...But griots no longer exist."

However, Diabaté also believed that the image of the griot was reparable, and he saw literature as a catalyst to achieving that end. While he perhaps derived his initial legitimacy due to his belonging to the Malinké oral tradition, he sought to return the role of the griot to its former glory by betraying that tradition in favour of the written word.

== Fasiya and Fadenya ==
Diabaté's biographer, Cheick M. Chérif Keïta, views Diabaté's life, and many of his works, as the result of a dialectic between two opposing forces, Fasiya and Fadenya:

Fasiya represents the artist's attachment to the forms and practices that existed in society before his birth… Fasiya is a centripetal force in that it drives the artist to create within a tradition in accordance with the canons embodied by his father and paternal lineage. The second force is Fadenya, the instinct to compete with and rebel against those models of past times, embodied by the father and paternal lineage… it is this desire to distinguish oneself from one's ancestors that promotes the creation of new forms of expression and the individual discovery of new aesthetics.

Diabaté took on the role of griot as this was assigned to him by his lineage. In his younger years, as is often the case, Fasiya was dominant. But given Diabaté's evaluation of contemporaneous griots, it is no surprise that he sought distinction by abandoning the oral tradition, and temporarily his homeland. Fadenya is, however, ultimately positive, as competition is a creative force. When he returned to Mali, drawn back by his commitment to the community and country that raised him, his Fasiya, that which he created was incorporated into the tradition. By introducing the written word to the keepers of the oral tradition, Diabaté effectively changed the canons.

This dialectic of Fasiya and Fadenya is a defining characteristic of the Malian hero, the paradigm of which being the Epic of Sundiata Keita, and Diabaté features it prominently in his own novels. For example, in Le boucher de Kouta, the protagonist, a butcher, sells donkey meat to his clients without telling them despite the fact that it is against Muslim norms to eat donkey meat. The butcher is, in this sense, abandoning his traditional role and responsibilities. However, the residents of Kouta benefit greatly from the availability of affordable meat. Diabaté demonstrates that sometimes norms must be broken, and tradition must be betrayed, in order to effect positive change.

== Bibliography ==
- 1967: Si le feu s'éteignait (Bamako: Editions Populaires du Mali)
- 1970: Janjon et autres chants populaires du Mali (Paris: éditions Présence Africaine)
- 1970: Kala Jata (Bamako: Editions Populaires du Mali)
- 1975: L'aigle et l'épervier ou la geste de Soundjata (Paris: éditions Oswald)
- 1973: Une si belle leçon de patience (play) (Paris: O.R.T.F / D.A.E.C)
- 1979: Le lieutenant de Kouta (Paris: Editions Hâtier)
- 1980: Le coiffeur de Kouta (Paris: Editions Hâtier)
- 1980: Comme une piqûre de guêpe (Paris: éditions Présence Africaine)
- 1982: Le boucher de Kouta (Paris: Editions Hâtier)
- 1985: L'assemblée des djinns (Paris: éditions Présence Africaine)
- 1986: Le Lion à l'arc (Paris: Editions Hâtier)
