= FannyAnn Eddy =

Sierra Leonean LGBT activist (1974–2004)

FannyAnn Viola Eddy
- Born: June 14, 1974; Sierra Leone
- Died: September 28, 2004 (aged 30); Freetown, Sierra Leone
- Cause of death: Murder
- Known for: Founded the Sierra Leone Lesbian and Gay Association
- Spouse: Esther Chikalipa
- Children: 1

FannyAnn Viola Eddy (14 June 1974 – 29 September 2004) was a Sierra Leonean LGBT activist who founded the Sierra Leone Lesbian and Gay Association (SSLGA) in 2002, the country's first LGBT organisation. Eddy advocated for LGBT rights in Sierra Leone as well as throughout Africa, and in April 2004 addressed the United Nations in Geneva to advocate for the passing of the Brazilian Resolution. She was murdered in her office in Freetown in September 2004, in a crime that remains unsolved.

== Personal life ==
Eddy was born on 14 June 1974 in Sierra Leone, though spent a significant part of her early life in refugee camps in southern Africa due to the Sierra Leone Civil War. At the time of her death, Eddy had a 10-year-old son, Valentine, and a partner, Esther Chikalipa.

== Activism ==
In 2002, after spending time working with GALZ, an LGBT organisation in Zimbabwe, Eddy established the Sierra Leone Lesbian and Gay Association (SLLGA), the first of its kind in the country. The group offered social and psychological support to LGBT people, in addition to documenting harassment, detention and arbitrary arrests of LGBT Sierra Leoneans.

While the LGBT scene in Sierra Leone was described as "underground" due to widespread persecution, Eddy was noted as a visible, openly gay public figure who lobbied government ministers to address the rights and needs of LGBT people in what she called her "beloved Sierra Leone".

In April 2004, Human Rights Watch and the International Gay and Lesbian Rights Commission supported a group of LGBT activists, including Eddy, to attend an annual United Nations session in Geneva, Switzerland. Eddy addressed the UN Commission on Human Rights directly, where she testified on the "constant harassment and violence" experienced by LGBT people in Sierra Leone, and advocated for the passing of the Brazilian Resolution, which sought to recognise the human rights of LGBT people.

Shortly before her death, Eddy became a founding member of the Coalition of African Lesbians.

== Death ==
On 29 September 2004, a group of at least three men broke into the SLLGA's office in Freetown, where Eddy was raped and stabbed, with her neck eventually being broken.

== Legacy ==
Following her death, Human Rights Watch described Eddy as "a person of extraordinary bravery and integrity", and called on the Sierra Leonean government to investigate her murder "fairly and fully". The Joint United Nations Programme on HIV/AIDS released a statement describing its "deep shock" at her death.

Eddy's death was reported on internationally by LGBT media; The Advocate mourned the "silencing" of "a powerful voice", while Out described her as a "tireless" campaigner for LGBT rights.

As of 2022, Eddy's murder remains unsolved. The official investigation concluded that her death was not linked to her politics or sexuality.

Since Eddy's death, the SLLGA has continued to operate, now under the name Dignity Association. In 2005, the book Tommy Boys, Lesbian Men and Ancestral Wives: Female Same-Sex Practice in Africa, by Ruth Morgan and Saskia Wieringa, was dedicated to Eddy.

The Hirschfeld Eddy Foundation, a human rights organisation, was founded in 2007, and was named for her and German sexologist Magnus Hirschfeld. The following year, the FannyAnn Eddy Poetry Award was established in her honour.

== See also ==
- Violence against LGBT people
- LGBT rights in Sierra Leone
