= Sékou Touré (Ivory Coast) =

Ivorian diplomat (born 1957)

Sékou Touré Sékou Touré
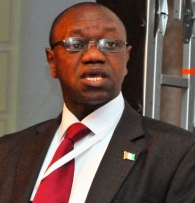
- Sékou Touré in July 2011
- Born: Sékou Touré; July 11, 1957 (age 69); Duékoué, Ivory Coast
- Education: University of New Hampshire University of Cincinnati
- Occupations: Environmental Engineer, UN Executive, Politician
- Title: Conflict Resolution Commissioner, GEF
- Term: September 2007 - December 2012
- Successor: William Ehlers

Sékou Touré (born July 11, 1957, in Duékoué, Ivory Coast) is the director of the Compliance Review and Mediation Unit (CRMU) of the African Development Bank (AFDB) and former Conflict Resolution Commissioner of the Global Environment Facility (GEF).

== Early life and family ==
Touré was born on July 11, 1957, in Duékoué, a town in the western region. His parents were Malinké from Odienné, in the Denguélé District, which lies in the northern part of Ivory Coast. Sékou Touré is married and has 2 children.

== Education ==
- 1989 - Ph.D. Civil & Environmental Engineering, University of New Hampshire
- 1985 - M.Sc. Civil & Environmental Engineering, University of Cincinnati
- 1982 - B.Sc. Civil Engineering, "École Nationale Supérieure des Traveaux Publics- ENSTP, Ivory Coast

== Career ==
- February 2001 to September 2007 - Director of the Regional Office for Africa, United Nations Environmental Programme (UNEP), Nairobi, Kenya
- March 2000 to January 2001 - Special adviser to the prime minister of Ivory Coast
- February 2000 to March 2000 - Special Adviser to the Minister of State for Development Planning and Coordination of the Government of Ivory Coast
- January 1996 to December 1999 - Junior Minister (High Commissioner for Hydraulics) of Ivory Coast.
- Additionally, Sékou Touré has taught in the United States and Ivory Coast

== Tenure at GEF ==
In September 2007, Sékou Touré joined the Global Environment Facility (GEF), as the Conflict Resolution Commissioner. In his role, Dr. Touré provides advice and intellectual leadership on the resolution of conflicts and disputes among countries and the Global Environment Facility (GEF) agencies or its secretariat.

Dr. Touré received recognition for his contribution to the work of the Intergovernmental Panel on Climate Change (IPCC) (Nobel Peace Prize received by IPCC and Former US Vice President Al Gore Jr. in December 2007).

Sékou Touré was one of the lead authors on the IPCC Special Report on the Regional Impacts of Climate Change and Assessment on vulnerability (He is the co-author of chapter 2: Africa). He also collaborated with IPCC to develop methodologies to estimate greenhouse gas emissions. His contribution to the work of IPCC date back to when he was a professor in Ivory Coast.

== Awards and honours ==
- Research and Teaching Assistantship, University of New Hampshire
- Summer Graduate Teaching Assistantship
- Central University Research Fund
- Fund for Dissertation Research, Sigma Xi
- Fellowship, African American Institute, New York City
- "Prix de la Recherche", Ivory Coast
- "Chevalier de l'ordre du Mérite Agricole", Ivory Coast
- "Diplôme d'Honneur, Fédération Nationale des Mouvements de Jeunesse Communale", Ivory Coast
