= Le lieutenant de Kouta =

1979 novel by Massa Makan Diabaté

- First edition (French)
- Author: Massa Makan Diabaté
- Language: French
- Genre: Novel
- Publisher: Hatier
- Publication date: 1979
- Publication place: Mali
- Media type: Print (Paperback)
- Pages: 127
- ISBN: 978-2-218-04645-2 (1st ed)
- OCLC: 6091008
- Dewey Decimal: 843
- LC Class: PQ3989.2.D44
- Preceded by: Une si belle leçon de patience (play)
- Followed by: Le coiffeur de Kouta

Le lieutenant de Kouta ("The Lieutenant of Kouta") is a 1979 novel by Malian author Massa Makan Diabaté. Loosely based on the author's hometown of Kita, Mali, the novel tells the story of a recently returned lieutenant from the French Colonial Army, Siriman Keita, and his struggle to adjust to his village's changing customs. It is the first book in Diabaté's "Kouta trilogy," followed by Le coiffeur de Kouta ("The Barber of Kouta," 1980) and Le boucher de Kouta ("The Butcher of Kouta," 1982), which feature many of the same characters.

== Plot ==
Lieutenant Siriman Keita has returned from a long service in the French Colonial Army (during which he was awarded the Croix de Guerre) to Kouta, a market village near his smaller home village of Kouroula. In Kouta, he at first plots to ascend to the canton chiefdom while avoiding his envious older brother, Faganda. However, his plans are scrapped when he humiliates himself in a horse-riding accident before the village, and he withdraws to his fortress-like "square house." After a time, he adopts a fatherless boy who he had once punished for stealing, and marries Awa, a Senegalese woman of questionable reputation. Disaster strikes the lieutenant again, however, when the French commandant incites him to lead a punitive expedition against the pro-independence village of Woudi. When the expedition fails, the lieutenant is stripped and humiliated before the people of Kouta and, after the commandant denies his own involvement, is sent to jail in the country's capital for disturbing the peace. He returns to find Awa pregnant by a young pro-independence activist, but having changed during his incarceration, the lieutenant forgives her betrayal and adopts the coming child as his own. He reconciles with the imam of the local mosque, formerly a bitter enemy, and eventually becomes the village muezzin, only to die mysteriously following an injection by his envious brother. The imam does him the honor of burying him in the mosque, while the French administrators, concerned by the example of his conversion, hastily and posthumously award him the Legion of Honour.

== Historical inspiration ==
According to Mamadou Sangaré, the character of Siriman Keita was inspired by the real-life figure of Mamadou Keita, a Colonial Army lieutenant who retired to Kita. Though many incidents of the novel, such as the punitive expedition to Woudi, are entirely of Diabaté's creation, Mamadou Keita did finish his life by converting to Islam shortly before his death in 1959.

== Criticism ==
The novels of Kouta trilogy are often named as Diabaté's finest works. The Encyclopedia of African Literatures for example, praises the novels' "colorful humor and . . . style worthy of a griot."

Cheick M. Chérif Keïta sees the novel as representative of the tension between fadenya—the pull of innovation—and fasiya—the pull of tradition—in Diabaté's work. In this reading, Siriman Keita is both oppressed by tradition in the form of his aggressive (and likely homicidal) brother, but also resents the changes that the youth-led independence movement are bringing to his country. Ultimately, however, the lieutenant comes to see that tradition "is not a monolith, but rather an edifice of which the fissures must always furnish an outlet for the creative energies of individuals and young innovators."

The novel itself can be read as a blending of traditions, joining the proverbs and customs of Maninka culture to the European form of the novel. As Diabaté himself commented to one interviewer, "J'essaie de donner à mon français, qui n'est pas le français de France, une coloration africaine, en y mêlant des proverbes, des récits et surtout en faisant, comme je l'ai toujours dit, "quelques petits bâtards à la langue française" ("I try to give my French, which isn't the French of France, an African coloring, mixing in proverbs, stories, and above all in making, as I always say, 'some little bastards of the French language'").

J.R. McGuire reads a similar tension in the Kouta trilogy, though using the terms fadenya and badenya. Austen argues that in this respect, the novels are highly influenced by Diabaté's early writings on the similarly structured Epic of Sundiata, which he calls "an inescapable intertext" for works from Maninke culture.
