= Fadenya =

West African familial concept

Fadenya or “father-childness” is a word used by Mande peoples, originally to describe the tensions between half-brothers with the same father and different mothers. The concept of fadenya has been stretched and is often used to describe the political and social dynamism of the Mande world. Fadenya is often discussed in contrast to badenya, or mother-childness.

== Definition ==
Fadenya originally described the conflicts between half-siblings with the same father, but different mothers. In the traditionally polygamous Mande world, half-brothers would often compete for control of their father's lineage and claim to his wealth and land. In order to do so, these brothers would have to set out on their own, leaving the safety of their community, in order to achieve recognition independently and claim the lineage of their father or to “[overcome] paternal and ancestral reputations”.

This setting out to make a name for oneself was particularly common among younger brothers, who were less likely to receive anything from their father and therefore more motivated to overhaul the system through their own actions. These younger brothers have more to gain and much less to lose if they leave the family to seek their own fortunes.

Although the term originally refers specifically to the conflict between brothers, the concept of fadenya is much larger than intra-familial conflict. In addition to its meaning of “father-childness", fadenya is also used as a word for conflict in general. Fadenya can also extend beyond immediate family and affect an entire clan.

Fadenya is seen as the source of political and social change in the Mande world, for upheaval of the existing social order occurs due to the tension of fadenya. Fadenya is associated with “centrifugal forces of social disequilibrium: envy, jealousy, competition, self-promotion”. Fadenya is the catalyst and root of all sociopolitical changes in the Mande world, “the conceptual vehicle of dynamism in Mande society”, and thus carries with it all of those connotations.

Fadenya itself requires a departure from society, whether literal or not. In many traditional tales, one leaves one's family and the safety it provides in order to make one's own name and fortune. Fadenya does not always imply a physical journey, however. One may also figuratively leave one's family and village by deviating in opinion or values.

Because fadenya describes paternal ties, and almost always describes tensions between men, fadenya is often considered a decidedly masculine force. This creates an interesting cultural phenomenon, in which men are seen as the forces of change and advancement or decline. The masculinization of change creates interesting gender roles within the Mande world.

== Positive and Negative Fadenya ==
=== Positive Fadenya Leading to Innovation ===
Because it is defined as rivalry and tension between half-siblings, fadenya may seem like an intrinsically destructive force. However, in reality, it is often tremendously positive. Fadenya is the means through which “the innovative actions of the young hero can lead to a modification of norms within the tradition of a community.” Through a positive form of fadenya, one can improve society through the evolution and growth of customs. It is only through innovation that a society can survive and thrive, and positive fadenya provides the impetus for such change.

This positive fadenya is “predicated on commitment to society’s traditions and social mores and describes how such traditions and mores are reproduced or ‘’reinvented’’ to meet the demands of, and even develop and improve, modern social life”. The emphasis in positive fadenya is a respect for the existing elements of society and a recognition that traditions should be “reinvented” as opposed to essentially changed. For fadenya to be positive, it must place value in the current society and badenya, and change elements only to innovate, not to destroy or severely alter.

As seen in the figure, positive fadenya necessitates reintegration. One must return from one's experience of the outside world or of other views, and bring this new knowledge to the community, using it to innovate and adapt existing customs.

=== Negative Fadenya Leading to Destruction and Shame ===
In contrast to positive fadenya, negative fadenya harms society. In instances of negative fadenya, one does not return with positive methods of integrating and innovating. A “dissociate breakdown into wildness” occurs, leaving family members shamed and society worse off.

One may use cruel force to impose different and self-serving values, rejecting years of societal progress and disrespecting the innovations and work of those who came before. That is, of course, if one returns at all. Negative fadenya can also signal an individual's complete break from society, in which one leaves and never returns with anything to benefit one's own family and people. This also brings about great shame.

== Relationship with Badenya ==
=== Badenya ===
Badenya refers to “mother-childness” or the relationship between siblings of the same mother within the polygamous structure. Because these siblings often share a closer bond, and do not compete among themselves as half siblings with the same father, badenya is a source of safety and security. Badenya is often what saves one from the tensions and competitiveness of fadenya. One can always rely on a full sibling because of badenya.

When expanded, badenya is a uniting, community-oriented force; it promotes stasis and security. Just as badenya is used to mean mother-childness or sibling-hood, it is also used to mean harmony. It “connotes devotion to home, family and tradition” and “conveys a sense of community, social solidarity, and shared intimacy”. Within the community, badenya represents the “centripetal forces of society: submission to authority, stability, cooperation”. The “strong forces in Mande society [which] emphasize group norms, decisions and success over those of the individual…are reflected in the term badenya.

=== Interactions between Fadenya and Badenya ===
Badenya is the reason which communities stay together despite fadenya; it is the strong link that acts against the weaker ones of fadenya. Badenya acts as the status quo to the change represented by fadenya and “carries with it a strong moral valence; there is a sense of an essential ‘goodness’ and ‘rightness’ to the familial collectivity badenya implies".

Fadenya is the “ ‘paternal’ corollary to the ‘maternal’ mores of badenya”. Just as fadenya is masculinized, badenya is feminized, as it represents maternal connection. It is also worth noting that it is through badenya that women often display their influence in society, for they have the power to protect their children from the forces of fadenya. By placing security and stability into the realm of women, badenya emphasizes their important role in society.

In the Mande world, both badenya and fadenya are integral to the survival of a community. While “Mande peoples focus much socialization activity on the fostering of fadenya behavior, recognizing that it is only through this force of change that their community will be able to survive trials and a changing world; they also recognize that without the stability badenya provides, their societies would be plunged into constant chaos." The tension between badenya and fadenya represents the tensions between the group and the individual. This tension is not dichotomous, but rather an “intersection of two axes”.

== Cultural Examples of Fadenya ==
=== Sunjata ===
The story of Sunjata, the founder of the Mali Empire, is a tremendously important aspect of Mande culture and provides not only historical information, but cultural information as well. Traditionally told through Griots, Sunjata contains many examples of fadenya, badenya, and their interactions.

==== Summary ====
The story, as told by Balle Fasseke, begins with the birth of Sunjata to the King, Maghan Kon Fatta, and his mother, Sogolon Kedjou. Sunjata is the second son born to his father but a wise hunter predicts Sunjata to be the founder of the Mali empire and ultimately the successor of his father.

When his father eventually dies, his father's first wife seeks to destroy him to eliminate any threat of competition between sunjata and her son (the king's first born son). At this point, Sunjata decides to leave his people, and sojourns to find his destiny. Through a series of events in which his mother, sister, and younger half-brother provide tremendous help, eventually Sunjata is able to become King and rule.

==== Examples of Fadenya and Badenya ====
Examples of fadenya are numerous in the story of Sunjata: from the way he is exiled and later comes to rule the Mande kingdom to his relationship with his mother. From the beginning of the tale, strong fadenya is established between Sunjata and his half-brothers, one of whom has stolen his place as the first born. This fadenya returns later, after the death of his father, when “his brothers got together,/ and then they went to a sorcerer/ and told him, ‘Attack [Sunjata] with a korte till he dies”. *** In response to this fadenya, Sunjata leaves his home to set out to make a destiny of his own, a classic element of fadenya.

Through Sunjata's journey, we see many examples of badenya. Even as a child, when he could not walk, it is his mother who comes to his aid when Sunjata proclaims “Call my mother:/ when a child has fallen down, it is his mother who picks him up” reflecting the deeply maternal and supportive essence of badenya ***. Later, when Sunjata is plotting to overthrow the rival who has stolen his homelands, it is Sunjata's sister who stands by his side and charms the tyrant into revealing his secrets. The fact that it is Sunjata's sister who plays such a significant role in his rise to power is reflective of the strong relationship between full siblings as described by badenya.

=== The Kouta Trilogy ===
Twentieth-century Malian author Massa Makan Diabaté's "Kouta trilogy" is often interpreted as demonstrating the conflict between fadenya and badenya. In Le lieutenant de Kouta, for example, the titular lieutenant struggles against the tyranny of his traditional animist elder brother, while seeking to preserve other traditions in the face of a youth-driven independence movement. In Le coiffeur de Kouta ("The Barber of Kouta"), the trilogy's second novel, the elders of the village similarly cite tradition in plotting against the village's young people, only to later realize that they must step aside so that the village can evolve and grow.
