= Mohamed Kakay =

Sierra Leonean politician

Alhaji Mohamed Kakay is a Sierra Leonean politician who is a member of parliament of Sierra Leone representing his hometown of Koinadugu District, one of the five districts that make up the Northern Province. Kakay is from the Mandingo ethnic group.
