= Kita Maninka language =

Manding language of Mali

Kita Maninkakan
- Central Malinke
- Native to: Mali
- Ethnicity: Mandinka
- Native speakers: 449,000 (2001-2014)
- Language family: Niger–Congo ?: Mande; Western Manding; Manding; West Manding; Kita Maninkakan

Official status
- Recognised minority language in: Mali

Language codes
- ISO 639-3: Either: mwk – Kita Maninka xkg – Kagoro
- Glottolog: kita1248
- ELP: Kagoro

Kita Maninkakan, or Central Malinke, is a Manding language spoken by about a million people in Mali, where it is a national language. About 10% are ethnically Fula.

The Kagoro variety is 86% lexically similar according to Ethnologue, and is being replaced by Bambara.
