= Alhaji A. B. Sheriff =

Sierra Leonean politician

Alhaji A. B. Sheriff is a Sierra Leonean politician. He is a member of the Sierra Leone People's Party and is one of the representatives in the Parliament of Sierra Leone for Koinadugu District, elected in 2002.
