= Lansana Fadika =

Sierra Leonean politician

Lansana Fadika is a Sierra Leonean international businessman, youth activist and politician. He is the current Sierra Leone People's Party (SLPP) chair of the Western Area region of Sierra Leone. He won the SLPP chairman for the Western Area at the party's national convention held in Kenema on March 6 and 7, 2009. His older brother Kemoh Fadika is the current Sierra Leone's ambassador to the Islamic Republic of Iran and a member of the SLPP'S bitter political rival, the All People's Congress (APC). They both belong to the famous Fadika family and members of the Mandigo ethnic group.
