= Brazilian Resolution =

The Brazilian resolution was presented to the Economic and Social Council of the United Nations in 2003. The resolution covered human rights and sexual orientation. It came under the Commission on Human Rights, fifty-ninth session, item 17 on the agenda.

Discussion of the resolution was postponed in 2004 because it was felt that it would not be passed. A formal UN declaration on sexual orientation and gender identity was discussed in the General Assembly on 18 December 2008.

== The draft resolution ==
The draft resolution was backed by Austria, Belgium, Brazil, Canada, Czech Republic, Denmark, Finland, France, Germany, Greece, Ireland, Italy, Liechtenstein, Luxembourg, Netherlands, Norway, Portugal, Spain, Sweden and the United Kingdom.

The resolution reaffirmed the Universal Declaration of Human Rights, the International Covenant on Economic, Social and Cultural Rights, the International Covenant on Civil and Political Rights, the International Convention on the Elimination of All Forms of Racial Discrimination, the Convention on the Elimination of All Forms of Discrimination against Women, the Convention against Torture and Other Cruel, Inhuman or Degrading Treatment or Punishment and the Convention on the Rights of the Child. It affirmed the equal and inalienable rights of all people, that the Universal Declaration of Human Rights affirms the principle of the inadmissibility of discrimination, and that human rights education is a key to changing attitudes and behaviour and to promoting respect for diversity in societies.

== Resolution ==
The resolution featured the following six statements

1. Expresses deep concern at the occurrence of violations of human rights in the world against persons on the grounds of their sexual orientation;
2. Stresses that human rights and fundamental freedoms are the birthright of all human beings, that the universal nature of these rights and freedoms is beyond question and that the enjoyment of such rights and freedoms should not be hindered in any way on the grounds of sexual orientation;
3. Calls upon all States to promote and protect the human rights of all persons regardless of their sexual orientation;
4. Notes the attention given to human rights violations on the grounds of sexual orientation by the special procedures in their reports to the Commission on Human Rights, as well as by the treaty monitoring bodies, and encourages all special procedures of the Commission, within their mandates, to give due attention to the subject;
5. Requests the United Nations High Commissioner for Human Rights to pay due attention to the violation of human rights on the grounds of sexual orientation;
6. Decides to continue consideration of the matter at its sixtieth session under the same agenda item.

== See also ==
- Human rights#Lesbian, Gay, Bisexual, Transgender (LGBT) rights
- LGBT social movements
- UN declaration on sexual orientation and gender identity
- The Yogyakarta Principles
