= Kita, Mali =

Kita
- Commune and town
- Location in Mali
- Coordinates: 13°2′20″N 9°29′15″W
- Country: Mali
- Region: Kayes Region
- Cercle: Kita Cercle
- Elevation: 330 m (1,080 ft)

Population (2018 census)
  - Total: 463,787

Kita is a town and urban commune in western Mali. The town is the capital of the Kita Cercle in the Kayes Region. It lies on the eastern slope of Mount Kita (Bambara: "Kita-kulu"), known for its caves and rock paintings. Today, the town is known for its music, its annual Roman Catholic pilgrimage and its role as a processing center for the surrounding cotton- and peanut-growing region. Kita lies on the Dakar-Niger Railway and is the largest transit hub between Bamako (180 kilometres or 112 miles) and Kayes (330 kilometres or 205 miles). In the 2018 census, the urban commune had a population of 463,787.

In November 1955, Kita became a commune of average exercise. On March 2, 1966, Kita became a commune of full exercise. The town grew in the 1990s around the cotton industry, but this has since declined.

A fictionalized version of Kita features as the setting for Malian author Massa Makan Diabaté's "Kouta Trilogy" (Le lieutenant de Kouta, Le coiffeur de Kouta, and Le boucher de Kouta).

== History ==
=== Name ===
Kita proper has been called with different names throughout history. One of its earliest names was "Guénou Kourou".

However, a second name "Sediousaba" had been used for the small village, or rather an area in the town.

=== Birth & Settlements ===
Two major settlements have been considered the birth of the town of Kita, however the order of these settlements are still subjects to debate. One of the settlements was attributed to the Tounkara traders from Ouagadou, the Ghana empire. Their chief, Diouna Tounkara, created "Sediousaba", which means "Three shea trees" as mentioned above. The second settlement was attributed to a Guinea trader, Siema Toloba Kamara, who created a village called "Fatali. Later, Siema Toloba Kamara and Diouna Tounkara allied with each other to form a new village called "Linguékoto".

== Population ==
In the Health Minister's 2018 census, Kita had a population of 463,787, while in 2020, the urban area of Kita counted 65,908.

== Climate ==
Kita has a fairly dry tropical savanna climate (Köppen Aw) with a hot to sweltering and arid dry season from November to late May and a hot, steamy wet season from late May to October. There is negligible rain and very low humidity in the dry season, whilst in the wet season rainfall totals around 900 millimetres or 35 inches with oppressive and uncomfortable humidity.

Climate data for Kita climate station (334 metres or 1,096 feet elevation) 1991-2020 averages
Month	Jan	Feb	Mar	Apr	May	Jun	Jul	Aug	Sep	Oct	Nov	Dec	Year
Mean daily maximum °C (°F)	33.6 (92.5)	36.0 (96.8)	39.1 (102.4)	40.6 (105.1)	39.3 (102.7)	35.8 (96.4)	32.1 (89.8)	30.1 (86.2)	32.1 (89.8)	34.6 (94.3)	35.8 (96.4)	34.2 (93.6)	35.2 (95.4)
Mean daily minimum °C (°F)	19.5 (67.1)	22.1 (71.8)	25.4 (77.7)	28.0 (82.4)	27.5 (81.5)	25.3 (77.5)	23.5 (74.3)	22.9 (73.2)	22.9 (73.2)	22.8 (73.0)	20.2 (68.4)	19.1 (66.4)	23.1 (73.6)
Average rainfall mm (inches)	0.6 (0.02)	6.2 (0.24)	7.6 (0.30)	9.8 (0.39)	39.6 (1.56)	121.9 (4.80)	200.5 (7.89)	254.5 (10.02)	195.2 (7.69)	60.1 (2.37)	2.1 (0.08)	0.4 (0.02)	930.0 (36.61)
Average rainy days (≥ 1.0 mm)	0.16	0.05	0.29	1.17	4.43	9.23	13.19	15.55	13.59	5.73	0.37	0.15	64.24
Mean monthly sunshine hours	249.7	250.6	290.4	269.5	262.3	243.4	202.9	191.0	217.0	268.2	254.3	254.4	2,931.7
Source: Meteo Climat

== Notable residents ==
- Sekou Koita, International Soccer player
- Bako Dagnon, female griot
- Cheick Hamala Diabate, griot and Afropop musician
- Mamadou Diabate, master kora player
- Massa Makan Diabaté, historian, author, and playwright
- Kandia Kouyaté, musician
- Djelimady Tounkara, musician and one of the foremost guitarists in Africa

== See also ==
- Railway stations in Mali
