= Brima Kamara =

Brima Kamara may refer to:

- Brima Acha Kamara, Inspector General of the Sierra Leone Police
- Brima Bazzy Kamara (born 1968), military commander during the Sierra Leone Civil War who was convicted of crimes against humanity
- Brima Kamara (footballer) (1972–1999), Sierra Leonean football goalkeeper
