= Sana Canté =

Guinean jurist and activist

- Occupation(s): lawyer, activist
- Movement: Vigilant Non-Compliant Citizen's Movement

Sana Canté is a Guinean jurist and activist. He chaired the Vigilant Non-Compliant Citizen's Movement over the years of the political and parliamentary crisis and was one of the most critical voices to the presidency of José Mário Vaz.
