= LGBTQI+ rights at the United Nations =

LGBTQI+ rights at the United Nations: Neither / States which did not support either declaration; Non-member states / States that are not voting members of the United Nations; Oppose / States which supported an opposing declaration in 2008 and continued their opposition in 2011; Subsequent member / South Sudan, did not exist in 2008; Support / States which supported the LGBTQ rights declaration in the General Assembly or on the Human Rights Council in 2008 or 2011

Discussions of LGBTQI+ rights at the United Nations have included resolutions and joint statements in the United Nations General Assembly and the United Nations Human Rights Council (UNHRC), attention to the expert-led human rights mechanisms (such as the United Nations Treaty Bodies and Special Procedures), as well as by the UN Agencies.

As of 2025, same-sex marriage is legally performed and recognized in 38 UN member states.

== History ==
Since its founding in 1945, the United Nations political bodies had not discussed LGBTQ rights (regarding equality regardless of sexual orientation or gender identity) until 1994 through the favorable resolution of the Toonen v. Australia case by the UN Human Rights Committee.

In April 2003, Brazil presented a resolution prohibiting discrimination on the basis of sexual orientation to the United Nations Commission on Human Rights. However, in the ensuing debates the Commission voted to postpone discussions on the resolution until 2004.

In December 2006, the discussions expanded to include gender identity, when Norway presented a joint statement on human rights violations based on sexual orientation and gender identity at the Commission on Human Rights on behalf of 54 states. This was followed by a joint statement presented at the General Assembly by Argentina on behalf of 66 states in December 2008. The 2008 statement in support of LGBTQ rights in the General Assembly prompted a statement backed by the Arab League and the Organisation of Islamic Cooperation in opposition to LGBTQ rights. Both statements remain open for signature, and neither has been officially adopted by the General Assembly.

On 17 June 2011, South Africa led a resolution at the UNHRC requesting that the United Nations High Commissioner for Human Rights (OHCHR) draft a report "documenting discriminatory laws and practices and acts of violence against individuals based on their sexual orientation and gender identity" to follow-up and implementation of the Vienna Declaration and Programme of Action. The resolution passed with 23 votes in favour to 19 against, with 3 abstentions. It was the first such resolution and was hailed as "historic".

The report, which came out in December 2011, documented human rights violations based on sexual orientation and gender identity, including hate crimes, criminalization of homosexuality, and discrimination. High Commissioner Navi Pillay called for equitable ages of consent; comprehensive laws against discrimination based on sexual orientation; prompt investigation and recording of hate crime incidents; the repeal of laws criminalizing homosexuality; and other measures to ensure the protection of the rights of LGBTQ persons. The text of the report from the UNHRC is dated on 17 November 2011.

In July 2014, the United Nations (as an employer) announced it would extend equal benefits to employees in same-sex unions entered into in jurisdictions where they are legal.

In September 2014, Brazil, Chile, Colombia and Uruguay led on a follow-up resolution at the UNHRC. This second resolution on "human rights, sexual orientation and gender identity" passed with an increased vote margin (25 to 14, 7 abstentions), reflecting the trend for increased support by member states to address these issues at the international level. It requested the UN High Commissioner for Human Rights to update the 2011 report "with a view to sharing good practices and ways to overcome violence and discrimination, in application of existing international human rights law and standards". The update was presented to the Human Rights Council in June 2015.

In 2016, the UNHRC passed a resolution to appoint an Independent Expert to find the causes of violence and discrimination against people due to their gender identity and sexual orientation, and discuss with governments about how to protect those people. This long-term OHCHR-based mandate has been seen as the UN's "most overt expression of gay rights as human rights".

Also in 2016, the UN Security Council condemned the Orlando nightclub shooting; this statement marked the first time the U.N. Security Council used language recognizing violence targeting the LGBT community.

== Background ==
Worldwide laws regarding same-sex intercourse, unions and expression. Same-sex intercourse legal. Recognition of unions: Marriage / Extraterritorial marriage^{2}; Civil unions / Limited domestic; Limited foreign / Optional certification; Same-sex intercourse illegal. Penalties: Death / Prison; death not enforced; Death under militias / Prison, with arrests or detention; Prison, not enforced^{1}; Same-sex intercourse Restricted/Ambiguous. Depends are: None / Restriction of expression, not enforced; Restriction of association with arrests or detention^{1}No imprisonment in the past three years or moratorium on law.^{2}Marriage not available locally. Some jurisdictions may perform other types of partnerships.

In the 1980s, early United Nations reports on the HIV/AIDS pandemic made some reference to homosexuality.

In its 1994 decision in Toonen v. Australia, the UN Human Rights Committee—which is responsible for the International Covenant on Civil and Political Rights (ICCPR)—declared that laws criminalizing consensual same-sex relations between adults are in violation of international human rights law.

In September 1995, sexual orientation became a topic of debate in the negotiations on the Draft of the 1995 Beijing Platform for Action at the 4th World Conference on Women. While the proposed language on "sexual orientation" was eventually dropped from the text, it was the first time governments took a public and explicit stance for or against the inclusion and recognition of sexual orientation as part of women's right to control their sexuality. At this conference, Beverley Palesa Ditsie became the first openly lesbian person to address the United Nations regarding LGBT issues, calling for States to adopt resolutions that recognized sexual diversity.

In 2003, Brazil tabled a Resolution at the UN Commission on Human Rights, stressing that human rights apply to all human beings regardless of sexual orientation. The resolution was indefinitely deferred (the Commission itself ceased in 2006 when the UN replaced it with the Human Rights Council). Since 2008, the 34 member countries of the Organization of American States have unanimously approved a series of resolutions affirming that human rights protections extend to sexual orientation and gender identity. Since 2002, the UN General Assembly has included a reference to sexual orientation in its biennial resolutions on extrajudicial, summary and arbitrary executions, as did the former Commission on Human Rights in the year 2000 and from 2002 to 2005. The latter had also addressed the use of the death penalty for sexual relations between consenting adults in its annual resolutions on the death penalty between 2002 and 2005.

As of 2010, same-sex relationships were illegal in 76 countries and punishable by death in five.

In recent years, the General Assembly resolution on executions also covered gender identity as a ground for protection.

== Joint statements ==
A series of joint statements on sexual orientation and gender identity by Member States at the UN General Assembly and Human Rights Council between 2006 and 2011 provides evidence of increasing support for the issues among UN Member States.

Following meetings between international advocacy leader Louis-Georges Tin and French Minister of Human Rights and Foreign Affairs Rama Yade in early 2008, Yade announced that she would appeal at the UN for the universal decriminalization of homosexuality; the appeal was quickly taken up as an international concern. Co-sponsored by France (which then held the rotating presidency of the EU) and the Netherlands on behalf of the EU, the declaration had been intended as a resolution; it is decided to use the format of a declaration of a limited group of states because there was not enough support for the adoption of an official resolution by the General Assembly as a whole. The declaration was read out into the General Assembly Record by Ambassador Jorge Argüello of Argentina on 18 December 2008—the first declaration concerning gay rights read in the General Assembly. The statement includes a condemnation of violence, harassment, discrimination, exclusion, stigmatization, and prejudice based on sexual orientation and gender identity that undermine personal integrity and dignity. It also includes condemnation of killings and executions, torture, arbitrary arrest, and deprivation of economic, social, and cultural rights on those grounds. The statement asserts: "we recall the statement in 2006 before the Human Rights Council by fifty four countries requesting the President of the Council to provide an opportunity, at an appropriate future session of the Council, for discussing these violations". Additionally, it says "we commend the attention paid to those issues by special procedures of the Human Rights Council and treaty bodies and encourage them to continue to integrate consideration of human rights violations based on sexual orientation and gender identity within their relevant mandate", indicating the Yogyakarta Principles, which provide definitions in detail on sexual orientation and on gender identity as a document on international human rights law.

=== Support ===
Several speakers addressing a conference on the declaration noted that in many countries laws against homosexuality stemmed as much from the British colonial past as from alleged religious or tradition reasons. Voicing France's support for the draft declaration, Rama Yade asked: "How can we tolerate the fact that people are stoned, hanged, decapitated and tortured only because of their sexual orientation?" UK-based activist Peter Tatchell said of the declaration:

This was history in the making… Securing this statement at the UN is the result of an inspiring collective global effort by many LGBT and human rights organisations. Our collaboration, unity and solidarity have won us this success. As well as IDAHO, I pay tribute to the contribution and lobbying of Amnesty International; ARC International; Center for Women's Global Leadership; COC Netherlands; Global Rights; Human Rights Watch; International Committee for IDAHO (the International Day Against Homophobia); International Gay and Lesbian Human Rights Commission (IGLHRC); International Lesbian and Gay Association (ILGA); International Service for Human Rights; Pan Africa ILGA; and Public Services International.

==== Signatories ====
96 member-states of the United Nations have sponsored the declaration in support of LGBTQ+ rights in the General Assembly, in the UNHRC, or in both. Sponsoring nations are listed below.

Africa

- Cape Verde
- Central African Republic
- Gabon
- Guinea-Bissau
- Mauritius
- Rwanda (formerly opposition)
- São Tomé and Príncipe
- Seychelles
- Sierra Leone (formerly opposition)
- South Africa (initiative)

Americas

- Argentina
- Bahamas
- Bolivia
- Brazil
- Canada
- Chile
- Colombia (initiative)
- Costa Rica
- Cuba
- Dominica
- Dominican Republic
- Ecuador
- El Salvador
- Guatemala
- Honduras
- Mexico
- Nicaragua
- Panama
- Paraguay
- Peru
- United States (initiative)
- Uruguay
- Venezuela

Asia

- Armenia
- Cyprus
- Georgia
- Israel
- Japan
- Mongolia
- Nepal
- Philippines
- South Korea
- Thailand
- Timor-Leste
- Vietnam

Europe

- Albania
- Andorra
- Austria
- Belgium
- Bosnia and Herzegovina
- Bulgaria
- Croatia
- Czech Republic
- Denmark
- Estonia
- Finland
- France (initiative)
- Germany
- Greece
- Hungary
- Iceland
- Ireland
- Italy
- Latvia
- Liechtenstein
- Lithuania
- Luxembourg
- Malta
- Moldova
- Monaco
- Montenegro
- Netherlands (initiative)
- North Macedonia
- Norway
- Poland
- Portugal
- Romania
- San Marino
- Serbia
- Slovakia
- Slovenia (initiative)
- Spain
- Sweden
- Switzerland
- Ukraine
- United Kingdom

Oceania

- Australia
- Federated States of Micronesia
- Fiji (formerly opposition)
- Marshall Islands
- Nauru
- New Zealand
- Palau
- Samoa
- Tuvalu
- Vanuatu

=== Opposition ===
Among the first to voice opposition for the declaration, in early December 2008, was the Holy See's Permanent Observer at the United Nations, Archbishop Celestino Migliore, who claimed that the declaration could be used to force countries to recognise same-sex marriage: "If adopted, they would create new and implacable discriminations. For example, states which do not recognise same-sex unions as 'matrimony' will be pilloried and made an object of pressure." A key part of the Vatican opposition to the draft Declaration relates to the concept of gender identity. In a statement on 19 December, Archbishop Migliore noted: "In particular, the categories 'sexual orientation' and 'gender identity', used in the text, find no recognition or clear and agreed definition in international law. If they had to be taken into consideration in the proclaiming and implementing of fundamental rights, these would create serious uncertainty in the law as well as undermine the ability of States to enter into and enforce new and existing human rights conventions and standards." However, Archbishop Migliore also made clear the Vatican's opposition to legal discrimination against homosexuals: "The Holy See continues to advocate that every sign of unjust discrimination towards homosexual persons should be avoided and urges States to do away with criminal penalties against them." In an editorial response, the Italian newspaper La Stampa called the Vatican's reasoning "grotesque", claiming that the Vatican feared a "chain reaction in favour of legally recognised homosexual unions in countries, like Italy, where there is currently no legislation."

The United States, citing conflicts with US law, originally opposed the adoption of the nonbinding measure, as did Russia, China, the Holy See, and members of the Organisation of Islamic Cooperation (OIC). The Obama administration changed the US position to support the measure in February 2009. An alternative statement, supported by 57 member nations, was read by the Syrian representative in the General Assembly. The OIC-led statement rejected the idea that sexual orientation is a matter of genetic coding and claimed that the declaration threatened to undermine the international framework of human rights, adding that the statement "delves into matters which fall essentially within the domestic jurisdiction of states" and could lead to "the social normalization, and possibly the legitimization, of many deplorable acts including paedophilia".

The OIC failed in a related attempt to delete the phrase "sexual orientation" from a Swedish-backed formal resolution condemning summary executions. Recently, though, the phrase was removed (with 79 votes to 70) and then subsequently restored (by a vote of 93 to 55).

==== Signatories ====
In 2008, 57 UN member nations initially co-sponsored the opposing statement. Three countries (Fiji, Rwanda and Sierra Leone) later switched their position to support the original resolution backing LGBTQ+ rights in 2011, leaving 54 countries as continued sponsors of the statement opposing LGBTQ+ rights. The countries that removed themselves as co-sponsors of the statement opposing LGBTQ+ rights are specifically noted below (all subsequently sponsored the statement supporting LGBTQ+ rights).

Africa

- Algeria
- Benin
- Cameroon
- Chad
- Comoros
- Côte d'Ivoire
- Djibouti
- Egypt
- Eritrea
- Ethiopia
- Gambia
- Guinea
- Kenya
- Libya
- Malawi
- Mali
- Mauritania
- Morocco
- Niger
- Nigeria
- Rwanda^{a}
- Senegal
- Sierra Leone^{a}
- Somalia
- Sudan
- Swaziland
- Tanzania
- Togo
- Tunisia
- Uganda
- Zimbabwe

Americas

- Saint Lucia

Asia

- Islamic Republic of Afghanistan
- Bahrain
- Bangladesh
- Brunei
- Indonesia
- Iran
- Iraq
- Jordan
- Kazakhstan
- Kuwait
- Lebanon
- Malaysia
- Maldives
- North Korea
- Oman
- Pakistan
- Qatar
- Saudi Arabia
- Syria (initiative)
- Tajikistan
- Turkmenistan
- United Arab Emirates
- Yemen

Oceania

- Fiji^{a}
- Solomon Islands

=== Abstain ===
==== Signatories ====
41 member-states of the United Nations have sponsored the declaration in abstention of LGBTQ+ rights in the General Assembly, in the UNHRC, or in both. Sponsoring nations are listed below.

Africa

- Angola
- Botswana
- Burkina Faso
- Burundi
- Republic of Congo
- Democratic Republic of the Congo
- Equatorial Guinea
- Ghana
- Lesotho
- Liberia
- Madagascar
- Mozambique
- Namibia
- Zambia

Americas

- Antigua and Barbuda
- Barbados
- Belize
- Grenada
- Guyana
- Jamaica
- Saint Kitts and Nevis
- Saint Vincent and the Grenadines
- Suriname
- Trinidad and Tobago

Asia

- Azerbaijan
- Bhutan
- Cambodia
- China
- India
- Kyrgyzstan
- Laos
- Myanmar
- Singapore
- Sri Lanka
- Turkey
- Uzbekistan

Europe

- Belarus
- Russia

Oceania

- Kiribati
- Papua New Guinea
- Tonga

== The United Nations LGBTI Core Group ==
An informal group of United Nations Member States was established in 2008 to focus on LGBTI rights intergovernmentally—by (most notably) ongoing collaboration between Global South and Global North state diplomats. As of 2022, the UN LGBTI Core Group is co-chaired by Argentina and the Netherlands and includes Albania, Australia, Belgium, Bolivia, Brazil, Canada, Cape Verde, Chile, Colombia, Costa Rica, Croatia, Denmark, Ecuador, El Salvador, France, Germany, Honduras, Iceland, Ireland, Israel, Italy, Japan, Luxembourg, Malta, Mexico, Montenegro, Nepal, New Zealand, North Macedonia, Norway, Peru, South Africa, Spain, the United Kingdom, the United States, Uruguay, the European Union (as an observer), as well as the Office of the UN High Commissioner for Human Rights (UN executive agency) and two non-governmental organizations: Human Rights Watch and OutRight Action International.

Unclassified discussions open to the public at UNHQ occur once or twice a year and an RSVP is regularly announced on Twitter. An event held on 10 December 2015 looked at The Economic Cost of LGBT Exclusion and offered fiscal effects from exclusionary practices from the World Bank who estimated it to be 5% of GDP and included the companion video released by the UN's Free & Equal campaign. UNDP announced the launch of their LGBTI Inclusions Index, a global collection of data which they hope will help sway minds and move countries toward as extreme hunger or clean water supplies could be remedied if this 5% of GDP was reallocated. At that meeting, the United Nations Development Pro brighter future for LGBTQ+ citizens. Another topic speaker on that day was the CEO of Out & Equal who recounted her 20-year efforts working with Fortune 500 and 1000 companies watching them move from 5% inclusion in 1995 to 90% inclusion by 2015. On 20 September 2017, the Group held an event entitled Ending Violence and Discrimination against LGBTI Persons. This included firsthand reports of Human Rights violations. For 17 May 2018, on International Day Against Homophobia, Transphobia and Biphobia, the UN LGBTI Core Group Special Event Celebrating our Allies opened with remarks by the UK Ambassador.

During the 2018 UN LGBTI Core Group meeting, UN High Commissioner for Human Rights Michelle Bachelet said:

More than 70 countries criminalise consensual same-sex relationships, and also criminalise transgender people based on their appearance. These laws subject LGBTQ+ people to long prison sentences, and in some cases physical punishment. They also implicitly encourage prejudice, hatred and violence. But laws can change … we need to see more countries taking steps to bring their laws and practices in line with the fundamental equality of all their people. It is essential that we defend and protect the LGBTI community, from every kind of violence and discrimination. There should be nothing 'controversial' about stopping people being murdered, or executed by agents of the State, simply because of who they are or whom they love. Tackling extreme violence does not require new norms.

== UN Human Rights Council ==
A resolution submitted by South Africa requesting a study on discrimination and sexual orientation (A/HRC/RES/17/19) passed, 23 to 19, with 3 abstentions, in the UNHRC on 17 June 2011. This is the first time that any United Nations body approved a resolution affirming the rights of LGBTQ+ people. The resolution called on the office of United Nations High Commissioner for Human Rights Navi Pillay to draw up the first UN report "documenting discriminatory laws and practices and acts of violence against individuals based on their sexual orientation and gender identity". The votes on this resolution were as follows:

African States (13)
South Africa initiative

- Angola — No
- Burkina Faso — Abstain
- Cameroon — No
- Djibouti — No
- Gabon — No
- Ghana — No
- Libya — Suspended
- Mauritania — No
- Mauritius — Yes
- Nigeria — No
- Senegal — No
- Uganda — No
- Zambia — Abstain

Asian States (13)

- Bahrain — No
- Bangladesh — No
- China — Abstain
- Japan — Yes
- Jordan — No
- Kyrgyzstan — Absent
- Malaysia — No
- Maldives — No
- South Korea — Yes
- Pakistan — No
- Qatar — No
- Saudi Arabia — No
- Thailand — Yes

Eastern European States (6)

- Hungary — Yes
- Poland — Yes
- Moldova — No
- Russia — No
- Slovakia — Yes
- Ukraine — Yes

Latin American & Caribbean States (8)

- Argentina — Yes
- Brazil — Yes
- Chile — Yes
- Cuba — Yes
- Ecuador — Yes
- Guatemala — Yes
- Mexico — Yes
- Uruguay — Yes

Western European & Other States (7)

- Belgium — Yes
- France — Yes
- Norway — Yes
- Spain — Yes
- Switzerland — Yes
- United Kingdom — Yes
- United States — Yes

The High Commissioner's report, released December 2011, found that violence against LGBTQ+ persons remains common, and confirmed that "Seventy-six countries retain laws that are used to criminalize people on the basis of sexual orientation or gender identity" (para. 40), and that "In at least five countries the death penalty may be applied to those found guilty of offences relating to consensual, adult homosexual conduct" (para. 45).

The High Commissioner's report led to a panel discussion by the Human Rights Council in March 2012. The divided nature of the UN (and the Council in particular) was again evident. Former UN Secretary-General Ban Ki-moon described violence and discrimination based on sexual orientation as "a monumental tragedy for those affected and a stain on the collective consciousness" (para. 3), and many others voiced similar concerns. However, "A number of states had signaled their opposition to any discussion of sexual orientation and gender identity by leaving the Council chamber at the start of the meeting", and "A number voiced their opposition on cultural or religious grounds, or argued that sexual orientation and gender identity were new concepts that lay outside the framework of international human rights law" (para. 11)

The UNHRC adopted a second resolution related to sexual orientation and gender identity on 26 September 2014 (A/HRC/RES/27/32). Among other things, the resolution calls a report from the Office of the High Commissioner for Human Rights on best practices for combating discrimination based on sexual orientation or gender identity. It passed by a vote of 25 to 14, marking the first time the UNHRC adopted a resolution on sexual orientation and gender identity with the majority of its members. The second resolution voting was as follows:

African States (13)

- Algeria — No
- Benin — Absent
- Botswana — No
- Burkina Faso — Abstain
- Congo — Abstain
- Cote d'Ivoire — No
- Ethiopia — No
- Gabon — No
- Kenya — No
- Morocco — No
- Namibia — Abstain
- Sierra Leone — Abstain
- South Africa — Yes

Asian States (13)

- China — Abstain
- India — Abstain
- Indonesia — No
- Japan — Yes
- Kazakhstan — Abstain
- Kuwait — No
- Maldives — No
- Pakistan — No
- Philippines — Yes
- South Korea — Yes
- Saudi Arabia — No
- United Arab Emirates — No
- Vietnam — Yes

Eastern European States (6)

- Czech Republic — Yes
- Estonia — Yes
- Montenegro — Yes
- Romania — Yes
- Russia — No
- North Macedonia — Yes

Latin American & Caribbean States (8)

- Argentina — Yes
- Brazil — Yes
- Chile — Yes
- Cuba — Yes
- Costa Rica — Yes
- Mexico — Yes
- Peru — Yes
- Venezuela — Yes

Western European & Other States (7)

- Austria — Yes
- France — Yes
- Germany — Yes
- Ireland — Yes
- Italy — Yes
- United Kingdom — Yes
- United States — Yes

=== Independent Expert on Sexual Orientation and Gender Identity ===
In 2016, the UNHRC passed a resolution to appoint an independent expert to find the causes of violence and discrimination against people due to their gender identity and sexual orientation, and discuss with governments about how to protect those people. Accordingly, Vitit Muntarbhorn, a Thai international law professor experienced in UN fieldwork, was the first UN Independent Expert on Protection against violence and discrimination based on sexual orientation and gender identity (IE-SOGI). Victor Madrigal-Borloz, a Costa Rican jurist experienced in human rights internationally, started 1 January 2018 as the second and current mandate-holder. On 12 July 2019, a vote to renew this position for another three years was passed by the Human Rights Council. On 7 July 2025, a vote to renew this position for another three years was passed by the Human Rights Council.

=== Intersex rights resolutions ===
In March 2019, the United Nations Human Rights Council adopted without a vote a resolution brought by South Africa on the rights of intersex people that "expresses concerns about existing discriminatory regulations, rules and practices that require some women and girl athletes to medically reduce their blood testosterone levels by undergoing unnecessary, humiliating and harmful medical procedures or hormone therapy in order to participate in women's events in competitive sports". The resolution also requests the Office of the United Nations High Commissioner of Human Rights to prepare a report "on the intersections between race and gender discrimination in sports". The resolution "recognises the multiple and intersecting forms of discrimination that women and girls face in sports settings, because of their race and sex", and "the right to bodily integrity and autonomy, among other things".

In April 2024, the United Nations Human Rights Council adopted resolution with a broader scope, titled "Combating discrimination, violence and harmful practices against intersex persons." The resolution was led by Australia, Chile, Finland and South Africa. It was adopted by a vote of 24 in favor, none opposed and 23 abstaining. The resolution "Express[es] grave concern about the violence and harmful practices that persons with innate variations in sex characteristics, including children, face in all regions of the world, including medically unnecessary or deferrable interventions, which may be irreversible, with respect to sex characteristics, performed without the full, free and informed consent of the person, and in the case of children without complying with the provisions of the Convention on the Rights of the Child." It also requests the Office of the United Nations High Commissioner for Human Rights to prepare a report and decides to convene a panel discussion in September 2025.

== UN Secretary-General and Secretariat ==
On 25 September 2018, United Nations Secretary-General António Guterres expressed support for a move towards greater respect for LGBTQ+ rights. In a pre-recorded speech, he addressed members of the UN LGBTI Core Group. He also praised India for legalising gay sex after the repeal of Section 377. He told attendees: "The United Nations stands up for the rights of the LGBTI community. Many of its members are imprisoned, abused and even killed simply for who they are or whom they love." He added: "Progress has been made in recent years, including this month with the decision by the Supreme Court of India. But so long as people face criminalisation, bias and violence based on their sexual orientation, gender identity or sex characteristics, we must redouble our efforts to end these violations. As we celebrate the 70th anniversary of the Universal Declaration of Human Rights, let me underscore that the United Nations will never give up the fight until everyone can live free and equal in dignity and rights." His speech was well received by LGBTQ+ activists, who praised it as an encouraging step.

=== Treatment of UN staff ===
In July 2014, it was announced that the United Nations (as an employer) would extend equal benefits to its employees who have entered into same-sex unions in jurisdictions where they are legal. Under the new policy, staff who have married a same-sex spouse in a jurisdiction will receive the same benefits and recognition as those in heterosexual marriages, regardless of whether same-sex marriage is legal in their country of citizenship. Former UN Secretary-General Ban Ki-moon supported a move towards greater respect for gay rights. He stated: "Human rights are at the core of the mission of the United Nations. I am proud to stand for greater equality for all staff, and I call on all members of our UN family to unite in rejecting homophobia as discrimination that can never be tolerated at our workplace."

== UN agencies and entities ==
Agencies and entities in the UN system have increasingly addressed human rights issues relating to sexual orientation, gender identity, and intersex status in recent years. An early and important milestone was in 1994 when the World Health Organisation (WHO) clarified that homosexuality was neither a disorder nor a disease when it removed sexual orientation from the International Classification of Diseases.

Since then other UN entities have made efforts to integrate issues concerning LGBTI persons into their work, including the OHCHR, the United Nations Development Programme (UNDP), UNICEF, UNESCO, the Office of the United Nations High Commissioner for Refugees (UNHCR), the International Labour Organization (ILO), the United Nations Population Fund (UNFPA), and the Joint United Nations Programme on HIV/AIDS (UNAIDS). For example, in 2013 the ILO issued the results of a pilot research on discrimination on the basis of sexual orientation and gender identity; in 2014, the UNDP released a discussion paper on transgender health and human rights; also that year, UNICEF published an issues paper on eliminating discrimination against children and parents based on sexual orientation and/or gender identity; and, since 2013, the OHCHR has dedicated ongoing efforts to produce a multipronged awareness-raising campaign, Free & Equal, relating to the human rights of LGBTI persons.

In 2014, the OHCHR, the UNDP, the UNFPA, the UNHCR, UNICEF, UN Women, the ILO, UNESCO, the WHO, the World Bank, and UNAIDS issued a joint report providing a snapshot of the work of UN bodies in combating discrimination and violence based on sexual orientation and gender identity and related work in support of LGBTI communities around the world, together with a contact list of focal points in each UN entity and links and references to documents, reports, and other materials that can be consulted for further information.

In 2015, the ILO, the OHCHR, UNAIDS, the UNDP, UNESCO, the UNFPA, the UNHCR, UNICEF, UNODC, UN Women, WFP, and the WHO issued a joint statement calling on states to act urgently to end violence and discrimination against LGBTI adults, adolescents, and children.

== See also ==
- LGBTQ rights by country or territory
- Vitit Muntarbhorn, the UN's first Independent Expert on violence and discrimination based on sexual orientation and gender identity
- Victor Madrigal-Borloz, the UN's second Independent Expert on violence and discrimination based on sexual orientation and gender identity
