= Mabinty Daramy =

Sierra Leonean politician

Mabinty Daramy (fl. 2007-present) is a Sierra Leonean politician. She was a deputy minister in President Ernest Bai Koroma's cabinet during both his terms and is currently the Ambassador to the Republic of Guinea.

According to Daramy, she was "a Senior Accountant at the Sierra Leone Produce Marketing Board for many years", before moving to the United States to work as a financial planner, managing a portfolio of US$50 million.

She campaigned for Koroma and the All People's Congress party in the 2007 general election. After Koroma was elected President of Sierra Leone, she was appointed Deputy Minister of Trade and Industry in November 2007. She retained that post during Koroma's second term until January 2013, when she became the Deputy Minister of Finance and Economic Development. She later served as the acting Minister of Trade and Industry. The ministry has supported small and medium-sized enterprises, and the then-acting Minister presented to Parliament the bill "The Small and Medium Enterprise Act, 2015", which was made an Act of Parliament on November 12, 2015. On March 13, 2016, President Koroma reshuffled his cabinet, and Daramy was appointed Ambassador to the Republic of Guinea. She presented her credentials to Guinean President Alpha Condé on September 8, 2016.

On Sunday, March 2, 2014, she was attacked and threatened at Lungi International Airport by a woman claiming to be the girlfriend of Alhaji Alpha Kanu, the Minister of Information and Communication. Daramy stated she had stopped dating Kanu long before.

She is a member of the Mandingo ethnic group. She has three children: Hassan, Ibrahim, and Sahid. Although Sierra Leone is predominantly Muslim, Daramy is a member of the influential Christian minority.
