= Lansana Baryoh =

Sierra Leonean footballer

Personal information
- Full name: Lansana Baryoh
- Date of birth: 15 June 1987 (age 39)
- Place of birth: Kabala, Sierra Leone
- Position: Midfielder

Team information
- Current team: Mighty Blackpool

International career
Years	Team	Apps	(Gls)
2006–	Sierra Leone		

Lansana Baryoh (born 15 June 1987 in Kabala, Sierra Leone) is a Sierra Leonean international footballer who is a midfielder and currently plays for Mighty Blackpool, one of the top clubs in the Sierra Leone National Premier League. He is a member of the Sierra Leone national football team. He started his football career with his hometown club the Bintumani Scorpions of Koinadugu in the Sierra Leone National First Division, the second highest football league in the country. He was a member of the Sierra Leone under-17 team that came in second place at the 2003 African Under-17 Championship held in Swaziland. He also a regular for Sierra Leone under-17 team during the 2003 Fifa under-17 World Cup in Finland.

He previously played for the Kamboi Eagles.
