= Balla Keita (Lieutenant General) =

Senegalese military officer

Lieutenant General Balla Keita is a Senegalese military officer who is the United Nations Force Commander of the United Nations Multidimensional Integrated Stabilization Mission in the Central African Republic (MINUSCA). Prior to this appointment of 11 February 2016 by UN Secretary-General Ban Ki-moon, Keita served as Acting Force Commander of the Mission.

== Career ==
Keita was nominated Force commander of the UN MINUSCA with his term to run from 2016 until 2020. From 2013 to 2015, he served as the Deputy Force Commander of the United Nations–African Union Mission in Darfur (UNAMID), a joint African Union-United Nations operation in Darfur, Sudan. From 2007 to 2010 he was the Sector Commander of the mission.

He held senior level military positions:

- Officer in charge of training and operations at the General Headquarters
- Director of information and public relations of the Armed Forces (DIRPA)
- Army Chief of staff and Inspector-General of the Senegalese Armed Forces 2011-2015

General Keita is a graduate of several military schools, including the École militaire interarmes of France, the United States Army Command and General Staff College of Fort Leavenworth, Kansas (USA), and the Command and General Staff Academy of the German Armed Forces, Hamburg. He is an alumnus of the Geneva Centre for Security Policy (GCSP).
