= Kemoh Fadika =

Sierra Leonean diplomat

Alhaji Mohamed Kemoh Fadika

Sierra Leone Ambassador to Iran
- Incumbent
- Assumed office June 21, 2009
- President: Ernest Bai Koroma

Personal details
- Born: Bo, Sierra Leone
- Party: All People's Congress (APC)
- Education: Njala University: Njala, Moyamba District, Sierra Leone
- Profession: Diplomat

Alhaji Mohamed Kemoh Fadika (born in Bo, Sierra Leone) is a Sierra Leonean diplomat who formerly served as Sierra Leone's ambassador to Iran. He was appointed to the position by the country's president Ernest Bai Koroma on June 21, 2008.

Fadika had served as Sierra Leone's ambassador to Egypt from 1981 to 1983, he also served as Sierra Leone deputy High Commissioner to Nigeria from 1977 to 1981.

== Background ==
Fadika was born in Sierra Leone to Muslim parents from the Mandinka ethnic group. He came from a family of eight children.
