= Kanji Daramy =

Kanji Daramy was a Sierra Leonean technocrat and was the first managing director of the Sierra Leone Post Office and subsequently the Presidential spokesman for former Sierra Leone's president Ahmad Tejan Kabbah during his second term as president from 2002–2007. Daramy was the Chairman of Sierra Leone National Telecommunications Commission until 2007. He is a member of the Mandingo ethnic group.
