= Sitta Umaru Turay =

Sierra Leonean journalist (born 1978)

Personal details
- Born: December 24, 1978 (age 47) Freetown, Sierra Leone
- Education: Njala University
- Profession: Journalist

Sitta Umaru Turay (born December 24, 1978, in Freetown, Sierra Leone) is a Sierra Leonean journalist and current member of the editorial Board of the Freetown-based Sierra Express newspaper.
