= Sheka Tarawalie =

Sheka Tarawalie is a Sierra Leonean journalist, writer and author who, until March 2016, was Sierra Leone's Deputy Minister of Internal Affairs, a position he got in January 2013 in the new cabinet of President Ernest Bai Koroma's second term. He was previously the Deputy Minister of Information & Communications, to which he was appointed in December 2010 by President Koroma, whom he served as Press Secretary immediately before that. He was appointed to the position of Press Secretary in December 2007.

Tarawalie is an English Honours graduate from Fourah Bay College (Sierra Leone's premier university founded in 1827), and he was the founder and one-time editor-in-chief of The Torchlight, a Freetown newspaper, in which he was very critical of the previous government of President Ahmad Tejan Kabbah especially through his weekly 'Black Tank' column. He travelled to the United Kingdom and eventually sought right of asylum because of threats to his life. When his initial asylum claim was turned down, he launched a well-supported local and national appeal from Manchester.

He worked at the Citizens Advice Bureau and as a journalist in a voluntary capacity, eventually becoming sub-editor of Expotimes (an online news organ), and board member of the Exiled Journalists' Network, UK. He was also a member of the Manchester branch of Britain's National Union of Journalists (NUJ). He made a name for himself by excelling in his work at the Citizens Advice Bureau and attracted an award personally given to him by the Princess Royale, Princess Anne, at a well-attended ceremony in York, England. He got married in the Church of England to Rose Tarawalie (née Kabeera), a British national of Rwandan origins.

He returned to Sierra Leone to take up the position of Press Secretary when the President appointed him.

In 2019, Sheka and wife agreed to re-settle in the UK and live in Oldham where they first met.

Tarawalie is one of Sierra Leone's most distinguished journalists. He has written a 400-odd-page autobiography, 'Pope Francis, Politics and the Mabanta Boy'[2019] published by Troubador[UK] and a well-received novel 'Lovebird Escapes'[2022] published by The Book Guild Ltd (UK).

Sheka has re-joined the National Union of Journalists and is now a member of the Society of Authors (UK). His current day job is with Citizens Advice SORT (Stockport, Oldham, Rochdale & Trafford).

Sheka also does research work with the Polish University Abroad in London.
