= Brima Dawson Kuyateh =

Sierra Leonean journalist

Brima Dawson Kuyateh is a Sierra Leonean journalist who once served as the president of the Sierra Leone Reporters Union.
