= Kallon =

Kallon is a surname of Sierra Leone, most notable is the Kallon footballer family.

- Mohamed Kallon, youngest of the three, played at Internazionale, Monaco
  - Kemokai Kallon, Sierra Leonean footballer, brother of Mohamed
  - Musa Kallon, Sierra Leonean footballer, brother of Mohamed
  - Kallon F.C., founded by Mohamed Kallon
- Abdul Kallon, American lawyer
- Morris Kallon, former Sierra Leonean rebel military commander
- Varney Kallon (born 1975), Liberian footballer
