= Aniru Conteh =

Sierra Leonean physician (1942–2004)

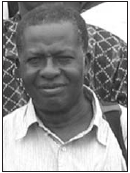
- Born: 6 August 1942; Jawi Folu, Eastern Province, British Sierra Leone
- Died: 4 April 2004 (aged 61); Kenema, Sierra Leone
- Education: University of Ibadan; Fourah Bay College
- Years active: 1979–2004
- Known for: Lassa fever isolation ward
- Medical career
- Profession: Chief medical officer
- Institutions: Kenema Government Hospital; Merlin; Nixon Memorial Hospital; Centers for Disease Control and Prevention
- Research: Lassa fever
- Awards: Spirit of Merlin Award

Aniru Sahib Sahib Conteh (6 August 1942 – 4 April 2004) was a Sierra Leonean physician and expert on the clinical treatment of Lassa fever, a viral hemorrhagic fever endemic to West Africa caused by the Lassa virus. Conteh studied medicine at the University of Ibadan in Nigeria and taught at Ibadan Teaching Hospital. He later returned to Sierra Leone where he joined the Centers for Disease Control and Prevention (CDC) Lassa fever program at Nixon Methodist Hospital in Segbwema, first as superintendent and then as clinical director.

After the Sierra Leone Civil War began in 1991, the CDC closed their program in Segbwema. Conteh and his medical team moved from Segbwema to the Kenema Government Hospital (KGH), where he spent the next two decades running the only dedicated Lassa fever ward in the world. Conteh collaborated with the British charity Merlin to promote public health in Sierra Leone through education and awareness campaigns intended to prevent Lassa fever. With little funding and few supplies, Conteh successfully reduced mortality rates and saved many lives until an accidental needlestick injury led to his own death from the disease in 2004.

Conteh received renewed public attention in 2009 as the hero of Ross I. Donaldson's memoir, The Lassa Ward.

== Early life, education, and teaching ==
Aniru Sahib Sahib Conteh was born on 6 August 1942, in the town of Jawi Folu, Eastern Province, British Sierra Leone, the son of a farmer and chief of the village. He moved to Freetown, the capital of Sierra Leone, after his mother died while he was in his teens. Conteh studied chemistry and biology at Fourah Bay College and began teaching after receiving his BSc. In 1968, he began studying medicine in Nigeria at the modern University of Ibadan, graduating in 1974. Conteh spent the next four years employed by the Ibadan Teaching Hospital. He returned home to Sierra Leone in 1979. Conteh married and raised a family with his wife Sarah, producing several sons and daughters.

== Medical career ==
Conteh spent his professional career working with people with Lassa fever, a viral hemorrhagic fever endemic to West Africa. Lassa fever was first brought to the attention of the public in 1969 during an outbreak in Nigeria. Identified in 1972, the disease is known to spread through its host, the Natal multimammate mouse (Mastomys natalensis), and infects an estimated 300,000 people and results in 5000 deaths annually in Sierra Leone, Liberia, and Guinea. In 1976, a hospital-acquired infection outbreak in the Panguma Catholic Hospital attracted attention in the United States. In response, the Centers for Disease Control and Prevention (CDC) established research programs in Segbwema, Kenema, and Panguma to study the disease.

=== Nixon Methodist Hospital ===
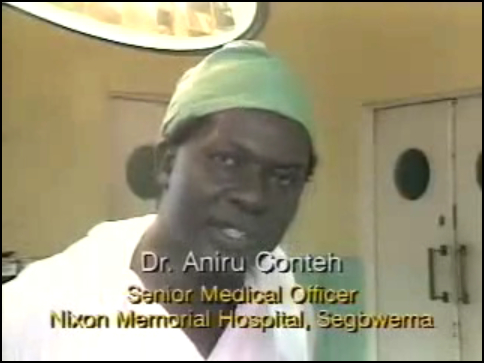
Aniru Conteh in a 1989 CDC documentary about Lassa fever

In 1979, Conteh began working with the CDC and team leader Joseph B. McCormick at the Nixon Methodist Hospital in Segbwema. Conteh became Medical Superintendent of the hospital in 1980. The Sierra Leone Civil War broke out in 1991, forcing the CDC to close their program and move to Guinea. The hospital was destroyed in the conflict and the spread of Lassa fever grew worse. During the civil war, the Natal multimammate mouse infested abandoned houses, increasing the likelihood of infection.

=== Kenema Government Hospital ===
Conteh now found himself in the middle of a war zone, starving and homeless. He wandered about for several months and finally came to Kenema where he began treating the sick in the midst of the fighting. Although he had friends overseas, and could have procured a job outside Sierra Leone, he chose to stay and help his people because "they had no one to help them". Due to the war, most experts familiar with Lassa fever had left the country, and patients suspected of having the disease began to be brought to Conteh for treatment. The Lassa team moved from Segbwema to the Kenema Government Hospital (KGH). In Kenema, Conteh became director of the only Lassa fever isolation ward in the world. Rebels from the Revolutionary United Front took over the town of Kenema in 1997 and 1999, but Conteh never left his post. It is thought that the rebels spared the hospital from destruction because they were afraid of catching Lassa fever. When the civil war ended in 2002, the government of Sierra Leone began the process of rebuilding the country.

=== Contributions to medicine ===
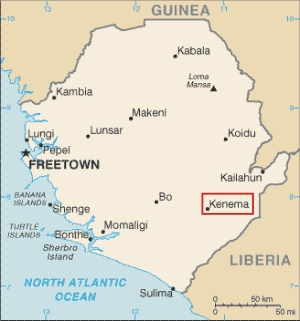
Conteh established the Lassa Isolation Ward at Kenema Government Hospital after the CDC moved its facilities to Guinea due to the civil war in Sierra Leone

During the civil war, Conteh was the only clinician in Sierra Leone who had the skills and qualifications to manage patients with Lassa fever. In the absence of the CDC, the Lassa ward was supported by Merlin, a medical relief agency based in the UK. According to Nicholas Mellor, co-founder of Merlin, "Conteh worked with Merlin to get a new laboratory built that would enable collaboration with international research centres with an interest in haemorrhagic diseases. He also worked on training and Lassa fever awareness campaigns." Conteh's Lassa fever program "provided the blueprint for many experts". In 1996, Daniel Bausch at the Tulane University School of Public Health and Tropical Medicine began working with Conteh and the CDC on research related to Lassa fever.

In 2000, Conteh coauthored a study published in the Journal of Clinical Microbiology comparing the efficacy and outcome of diagnosing Lassa fever patients with the indirect fluorescent-antibody (IFA) test and the enzyme-linked immunosorbent assay (ELISA). According to Iruka N. Okeke, the study "focused specifically on the development of a diagnostic test for Lassa fever". In 2001, Conteh travelled to London, England to attend an international conference on Lassa fever where he presented a paper on managing the disease. Conteh returned to London in September 2003 to receive the "Spirit of Merlin" award for his outstanding role in "saving lives and alleviating suffering".

== Death ==
The Lassa ward was short-staffed, and Conteh would often draw blood from people himself. On 17 March 2004, Conteh was infected with the Lassa virus when he received a needlestick injury while drawing blood from a young pregnant nurse with the disease. The nurse died the next day, and Conteh himself became ill on 23 March. As his condition worsened, he was treated with intravenous ribavirin. Conteh initially survived the critical stage of Lassa fever, but died on 4 April from renal failure—18 days after first becoming infected with the Lassa virus. Reporter Sulaiman Momodu described the outpouring of grief in the wake of Conteh's death:

News of his death spread in Kenema and its environs like a bush fire in the harmattan. Most people were devastated to learn that the only Lassa Fever specialist in Sierra Leone was gone, gone forever. Nurses cried, patients wept. Kenema was thrown into a state of shock and mourning.

Conteh's funeral was held in the town of Daru.

== Legacy ==
Conteh's work in the Lassa ward spanned 25 years and saved thousands of lives. He played a key role in helping Merlin implement a program to support the Lassa ward and fever control measures in Sierra Leone. Because of his skill and dedication, deaths due to cases of suspected Lassa fever declined by 20%. After Conteh's death, Merlin and the peacekeepers in the United Nations Mission in Sierra Leone (UNAMSIL) left Sierra Leone and the Lassa ward in Kenema was barely functioning. In 2004, Tulane University, in co-ordination with the World Health Organization, began monitoring Lassa fever patients in Sierra Leone, Liberia, and Guinea through the Mano River Union Lassa Fever Network (MRU-LFN). Today, the Lassa Fever Program is fully operational at Kenema Government Hospital, and focuses on "treatment, containment, prevention and research".

Conteh was the mentor for UCLA medical professor Ross I. Donaldson in the summer of 2003, and is the hero of Donaldson's 2009 memoir, The Lassa Ward.

== Publications ==
- "Lassa Video". Sierra Leone: Centers for Disease Control and Prevention, Special Pathogens Branch. 1989. Archived from the original on 19 August 2009. Appearance in documentary film.
- Bausch, DG; Rollin, PE; Demby, AH; Coulibaly, M; Kanu, J; Conteh, AS; Wagoner, KD; McMullan, LK; et al. (2000). "Diagnosis and clinical virology of Lassa fever as evaluated by enzyme-linked immunosorbent assay, indirect fluorescent-antibody test, and virus isolation". Journal of Clinical Microbiology. 38 (7): 2670–7. doi:10.1128/JCM.38.7.2670-2677.2000. PMC 86994. PMID 10878062.

== See also ==
- Sheik Umar Khan
