= Mohamed B. Daramy =

Sierra Leonean politician

Alhaji Mohamed B. Daramy (born 1955 in Panguma, Lower Bambara Chiefdom, Kenema District, British Sierra Leone) is a Sierra Leonean politician. He has worked in industry, the private sector and in government, and been Minister of Labour, Minister of Trade, Minister of Transportation, Minister of Finance and recently Minister of Development and Economic Planning.

== Early life and education ==
Daramy was born to Alhaji Kemoh Daramy and Hadja Nmama Turay Daramy at Panguma, Lower Bambara Chiefdom, Kenema District within the Eastern Province of British Sierra Leone. Both of his parents came from the Mandingo ethnic group.

He completed his primary education at the Kailahun Primary School in Kailahun and then attended the Bo Government Secondary School in Bo where he attained O and A levels.

Daramy moved to the United States where he obtained a Bachelor's degree in Business Administration, a master's degree in Business Administration with a Finance major. He is also a certified public accountant (CPA) and a certified internal auditor (CIA).

He is a former soccer star who earned All-American status while at Elizabethtown College in Pennsylvania. He was drafted to play professional football but he turn down the offer to concentrate on school.
