= East End Tigers F.C. =

East End Tigers
- Full name: East End Tigers Football Club
- Nickname: Tongoma Boys
- Ground: Tongo Field; Tongoma, Sierra Leone
- Chairman: Negeh Barrie
- Manager: Mohamed Jawara
- League: Sierra Leone National Premier League
- 2019–20: 6th

East End Tigers Football Club, simply known as the East End Tigers, is a Sierra Leonean football club based in Tongoma, Kenema District. The club plays in the Sierra Leone National Premier League. The club's supporters are mainly from the town of Tongoma and Kenema District overall. The team was formerly known as Gem Stars of Tongoma.

== Rivalry ==
The Gem Stars' major rivals are the Kamboi Eagles of Kenema. Both clubs are based in Kenema District.
