= Tongo Field =

Tongo Field is a football field located in Kenema, Kenema District in the Eastern Province of Sierra Leone. The field is the home ground of Sierra Leone National Premier League Club the Gem Stars.
