= Humonya =

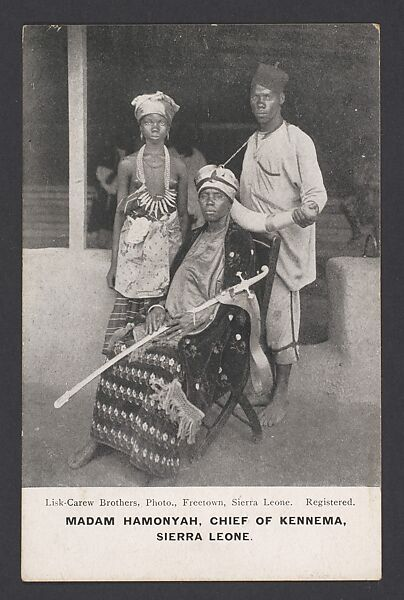
- Born: c. 1865
- Died: 1930
- Parent(s): Matolo

Humonya (c. 1865 – 1930) was the paramount chieftain of the Nongowa in Kenema in the Sierra Leone Colony and Protectorate from 1908 to 1918. She is remembered as the worst leader in Nongowa history.

Humonya was born around 1865, the daughter of Matolo (or Matto), wife Faba of Dodo. Following the Hut Tax War of 1898, the British divided the territory of Faba and his son Nyagua into three chiefdoms and installed Matolo as chief of the Nongowa. After Matolo was incapacitated with a broken leg, her daughter became regent and was elected chief outright after her mother's death on May 12, 1908.

Humonya moved her capital near to the British colonial officer in Kenema. Her rule was one of petty despotism, extracting money and labor on her people and inflicting harsh punishments, reprisals, and even executions. She had the support of the British, particularly colonial governor Richard James Wilkinson, to the point that Wilkinson transferred a colonial administrator, W. D. Bowden, who attempted to interfere with the excesses of her rule. Eventually, Governor Wilkinson imposed restrictions on her rule in 1918. He discovered that she was requiring neighbouring chiefs to send 200 de facto slaves to work for her and they had to be fed by her subjects. When they misbehaved then they were subject to arbitrary punishments.

She was ousted by vote in August 1919.
