= Kenema Government Secondary School =

Location
- Combema Road; Kenema, Sierra Leone

Information
- Type: Public School
- Motto: AUT OPTIMUM AUT NIHIL
- Religious affiliations: Christianity, Islam
- Established: 1952
- Founder: Chief Kaisamba
- Head teacher: Mr Mustapha John Mansaray [principal]
- Gender: Boys
- Age: 13 to 18

Kenema Government Secondary School is a government-sponsored all boys secondary school located in Kenema, Sierra Leone. The school was founded in 1952 by the Sierra Leone government to educate the children of Kenema. The school is regarded as one of the elite secondary schools in the country.

3rd Principal:MR C.L.HOLDEN 1959-1961

== Notable alumni ==
- Paul Kpaka, Sierra Leonean football star

jb Rogers, former minister of finance .
