= Conteh =

Conteh is a common surname among the Limba people and Temne people of Sierra Leone, They are all mandingo speaking people also in the rest of West africa and may refer to:

- Abdul Thompson Conteh, Sierra Leonean football player
- Abdulai Conteh, Sierra Leonean politician
- Alfred Amadu Conteh, American artist
- Alfred Paolo Conteh, Sierra Leone's defense minister
- Aniru Conteh, Sierra Leonean physician
- Christian Conteh, German footballer
- Denni Conteh, former Danish footballer of Sierra Leonean descent
- John Conteh, former British boxing champion
- Kandeh Baba Conteh, Sierra Leonean politician
- Kewullay Conteh, Sierra Leonean football player
- Lamin Junior Tumbu Conteh, Sierra Leonean football player
