= Donald Wellington =

Sierra Leonean international footballer (born 1992)

Personal information
- Full name: Donald Koboh Wellington
- Date of birth: 10 September 1992 (age 34)
- Height: 1.83 m (6 ft 0 in)
- Position: Striker

Team information
- Current team: Karela United

Senior career*
Years	Team	Apps	(Gls)
2010–2011	Ports Authority		
2011	IFK Värnamo	9	(3)
2011–2012	Ports Authority		
2012–2013	Shabab Al-Ghazieh	0	(0)
2013–2015	Gem Stars		
2016	East End Lions		
2017	Ports Authority		
2018–	Karela United		

International career^{‡}
2011–	Sierra Leone	4	(0)
- * Club domestic league appearances and goals as of 19:56, 13 August 2018 (UTC) ‡ National team caps and goals as of 19:56, 13 August 2018 (UTC)

Donald Koboh Wellington (born 10 September 1992) is a Sierra Leonean international footballer who plays for Ghanaian club Karela United, as a striker.

== Career ==
Wellington has played club football for Ports Authority, IFK Värnamo, Shabab Al-Ghazieh, Gem Stars, East End Lions and Karela United. Before joining Värnamo, Wellington was linked with Norwegian club Stabæk.

He made his international debut for Sierra Leone in 2011.
