= Blama =

- Location in Sierra Leone
- Coordinates: 8°39′N 11°4′W
- Country: Sierra Leone
- Province: Eastern Province
- District: Kenema District
- Chiefdom: Small Bo Chiefdom
- Time zone: UTC-5 (GMT)

Blama is a town and the seat of Small Bo Chiefdom, Kenema District in the Eastern Province of Sierra Leone. Blama is located on the highway from Bo to Kenema, the largest city in Kenema District and the Eastern Province overall. Blama lies approximately twelve miles to Kenema, and about 170 miles south-east of Freetown.

The population Blama is ethnically diverse, though the Mende people are the largest and principal inhabitants.

== Education ==
Blama is home to the Saint Joseph Secondary School and Ahmadiyya Muslim Secondary School, which serves the town and its surrounding areas.

The town of Blama is home to the Roman Catholic Primary School for Boys, National Islamic Primary School, New Harvest Primary School, and the Sierra Leone Church (SLC) Primary School.

== Notable people ==
Professional basketball player Victor Oladipo's father was born and raised in Blama.
