= Wando =

Wando may refer to:

== People ==
- Wando people, a Native American tribe
- Wando (singer) (1945–2012), stage name of Brazilian singer Wanderley Alves dos Reis
- Wando (footballer, born 1963), full name Geovânio Bonfim Sobrinho, Brazilian football winger
- Wando (footballer, born 1980), full name Wando da Costa Silva, Brazilian football winger

== Places ==
- Wando (island), South Jeolla
- Wando, South Carolina, an unincorporated community
- Wando Chiefdom, Sierra Leone
- Wando County, South Korea

== Other uses ==
- Wando (horse), a thoroughbred racehorse that won the Canadian Triple Crown
- USS Wando, the name of more than one United States Navy ship
- Wando High School, South Carolina, United States
- Wando River, South Carolina, United States
- Wando River (Victoria), Australia
