= Alpha Lansana =

Sierra Leonean footballer

Personal information
- Full name: Alpha Sumoi Lansana
- Date of birth: October 14, 1980 (age 46)
- Place of birth: Kenema, Sierra Leone
- Height: 5 ft 10 in (1.78 m)
- Position: Defender

Team information
- Current team: Kamboi Eagles

Senior career*
Years	Team	Apps	(Gls)
2002–2005	Mighty Blackpool		
2005–2010	Ports Authority		
2010–2012	Mighty Blackpool		
2012–	Kamboi Eagles		

International career^{‡}
2002–	Sierra Leone	9	(0)
- * Club domestic league appearances and goals ‡ National team caps and goals as of 4 June 2012

Alpha Sumoi Lansana (born October 14, 1980) is a Sierra Leonean international footballer who currently plays as a defender for Kamboi Eagles in the Sierra Leone National Premier League. Lansana is a regular member of the Sierra Leone national football team.
