= Kambui Hills Forest Reserve =

Protected area in Sierra Leone

- IUCN category VI (protected area with sustainable use of natural resources)
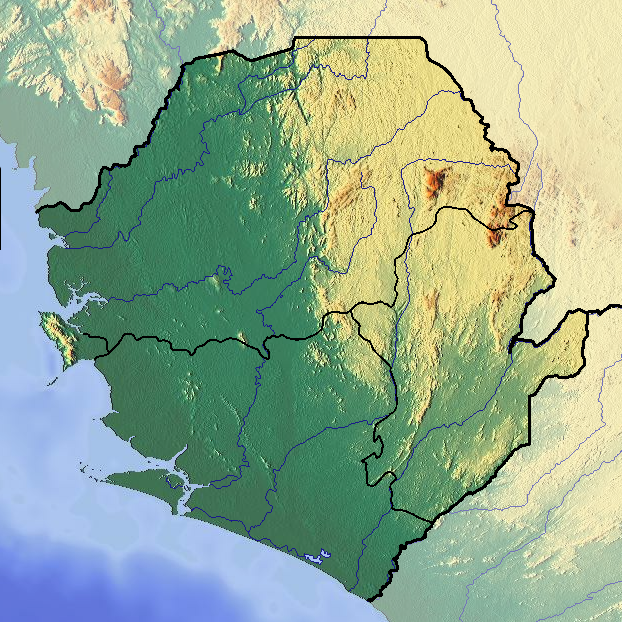
- Location within Sierra Leone
- Location: Eastern Province, Sierra Leone
- Nearest city: Kenema
- Coordinates: 07°51′34″N 11°19′27″W
- Area: 14,335 ha (35,420 acres)

The Kambui Hills Forest Reserve occupies an area of 14,335 ha in the Kenema District of the Eastern Province of Sierra Leone. It is located 10 km from the town of Kenema with terrain consisting of steep slopes that reach an altitude of between 100 and 645 m.

== Environment ==
The area mainly contains forest habitat but there is also some savanna and wetland. The reserve serves as a water catchment area for reservoirs that supply Kenema and surrounding communities. The vegetation is mainly mature secondary moist forest with semi-deciduous forest on the slopes, and farmbush and thicket on the lower plains and reserve fringes.

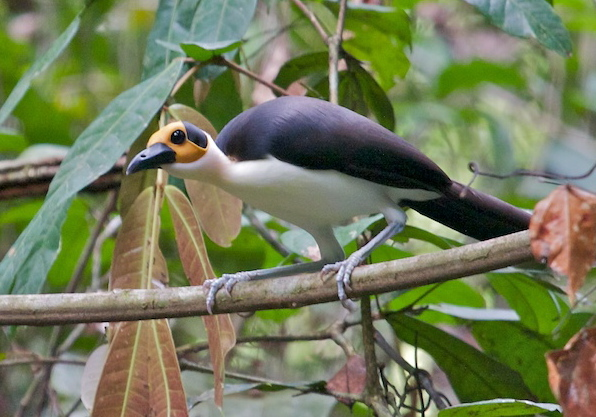
White-necked rockfowl in the reserve.

Over 200 separate species of birds have been recorded in the reserve including vulnerable species: the white-necked rockfowl and green-tailed bristlebill, and near threatened species: the yellow-casqued hornbill, rufous-winged illadopsis and copper-tailed glossy-starling. The reserve has been designated an Important Bird Area (IBA) by BirdLife International because it supports significant populations of many bird species. Primates found in the hills are western chimpanzees, western red and king colobuses, sooty mangabeys and Diana monkeys. Other mammals present include African forest elephants, and Jentink's, Maxwell's and black duikers.

== See also ==
- Protected areas of Sierra Leone
