= Pandebu-Tokpombu =

- Location in Sierra Leone
- Coordinates: 7°34′57″N 10°49′43″W
- Country: Sierra Leone
- Province: Eastern Province
- District: Kenema District

Population (2004)
  - Total: 20,219

Pandebu-Tokpombu is the eighth largest town of Sierra Leone and the second largest in the Kenema District, after its capital Kenema.

The population of the Pandebu-Tokpombu was 20,219 in the 2004 census.
