= Kenema Town Field =

Football venue in Sierra Leone

Coordinates: 7.8768°N 11.1842°W

Kenema Town Field, is a mini-stadium located in Kenema, Sierra Leone. It is mostly used for soccer games and it also the home field of Kamboi Eagles football club.
