= Brima Sesay =

Sierra Leonean footballer

Personal information
- Full name: Brima Sesay
- Date of birth: January 27, 1981
- Place of birth: Kenema, Sierra Leone
- Date of death: April 4, 2009 (aged 28)
- Position: Goalkeeper

Senior career*
Years	Team	Apps	(Gls)
1996–2009	Ports Authority F.C.		

International career
2001–2003	Sierra Leone	10	(0)
- * Club domestic league appearances and goals

Brima Sesay (born 27 January 1981 in Kenema, Sierra Leone – died on April 4, 2009) nicknamed Small Attouga, was a Sierra Leonean international goalkeeper. Sesay played for Ports Authority F.C. in the Sierra Leone National Premier League and for the Sierra Leone national football team known as the Leone Stars. He was one of the best young goalkeepers in Sierra Leone.

== Early life ==
Sesay was born in Kenema, Sierra Leone to Temne parents. Although born in Kenema, he moved to the capital city of Freetown at a young age.

== Career ==
Small Attouga, as he was commonly called, was recruited into active football by his late boss Brima Attouga Kamara, a former goalkeeper for Sierra Leone national football team. Having been initiated into active football, small attouga made a name for himself while playing in a series of junior league competitions played all over Freetown. He won several best goalkeeper awards with youth clubs like Blackhall Strikers, Junior Cenegal, and Best Contractors. In 1992, Brima Attouga Kamara brought him to Ports Authority F.C. youth team.

In 1996, he was promoted from the youth team, to the senior squad. However, his tiny physical appearance did no good during that time to convince his coach to become the club first choice goalkeeper.

In 1997, Small Attouga was outstanding as a goalkeeper in an international friendly against a top Liberian side Invincible Eleven. His performance in that match was enough to prove his critics that he deserved to be the club's first choice goalkeeper. And from that time, he had excelled as Ports Authority first choice goalkeeper, and as well as one of the best goalkeepers in Sierra Leone.

== International career ==
He made his senior debut for Sierra Leone in 2001.

== Death ==
He died of unspecified causes In April 2009. His funeral was held in Freetown and was attended by several prominent Sierra Leonean footballers, including the country's most popular footballer Mohamed Kallon.
