= Tongo, Sierra Leone =

Town in Eastern Province, Sierra Leone

- Location in Sierra Leone
- Coordinates: 8°39′N 11°4′W
- Country: Sierra Leone
- Province: Eastern Province
- District: Kenema District

Population (2009)
  - Total: 44,376
- Time zone: UTC-5 (GMT)

Tongo, also known as Tongoma, is a diamond mining town and the second largest city in Kenema District, (after the city of Kenema) located in the Eastern Province of Sierra Leone. Tongo is about 27 miles to Kenema. The population of the 60-sq.-mile city is 44,376.

The town is the seat of the Tongo Diamond Field, one of the largest diamond-producing areas in Sierra Leone.

== Demography ==
The city of Tongoma is ethnically and religiously diverse. The city is home to a significant number of most of the country's ethnic groups and attract people from all parts of Sierra Leone, due to the rich diamond mining in the area.

== Sport ==
As in all parts of Sierra Leone, football (soccer) is by far the most popular sport in Tongo. Children are seen playing street football all over the city. The city even have a professional football club in the Sierra Leone National Premier League called the Gem Stars of Tongo.

== Tongo Diamond Mining Field ==
The Government of Sierra Leone headed by the Minister of Natural Resources under the Administration of president Ahmad Tejan Kabbah originally granted a Mining Lease for the Tongo Diamond Field to Rex Diamond Mining Corporation Limited, a diamond mining and exploration company with its head office in Antwerp, Belgium. However, the new administration of president Ernest Bai Koroma headed by his Minister of Mines and Natural Resources suspended this contract.

A letter issued by Sierra Leone Ministry of Mines and Natural Resources required them to confirm that they would restart their operations or give up their mineral rights. Rex Mining failed to commit sufficient resources to their exploration programmes. As a result, the Government cancelled their Tongo and Zimmi mining leases in October 2007.

In an effort to introduce greater transparency into the granting of a new mineral right for the former mining lease area in the Tongo Diamond Field, the government of Sierra Leone decided to publicly offer the former mining lease area open to bids for exploration licences from interested companies. The advertisement published in local newspapers and on the internet stated that application forms could be obtained from the Geological Survey. The advertisement asked that in addition to providing ten completed application forms, interested parties should make a non-refundable payment of US$5,000 by bank draft to the Director of Mines. The advertisement included a statement that 'Companies are guaranteed a Mining Lease in accordance with the Mines and Mineral Act 1996 if prospects prove economically viable.' Other than some basic details on the dykes and 'blows' that had been discovered previously no further geological information was provided.
