= 2001–02 Inter Milan season =

Inter Milan
2001–02 season
- Owner: Massimo Moratti
- President: Massimo Moratti
- Head coach: Héctor Cúper
- Stadium: San Siro
- Serie A: 3rd
- Coppa Italia: Round of 16
- UEFA Cup: Semi-finals
- Top goalscorer: League: Christian Vieri (22); All: Christian Vieri (25)
- Highest home attendance: 79,188 vs Juventus (9 March 2002)
- Lowest home attendance: 47,728 vs Hellas Verona (19 December 2001)
- Average home league attendance: 62,434
Home colours	Away colours	Third colours

The 2001–02 season was Inter Milan's 93rd in existence and 86th consecutive season in the top flight of Italian football.

== Season overview ==
After a disappointing previous season, Massimo Moratti appointed former Valencia coach Héctor Cúper as the new head coach. Cúper managed to line-up a new team, buying players such as Toldo, Materazzi, Kallon and Ventola. Inter had a sprint-start, topping the league and passing several challenges in Europe. 2001 closed with Giuseppe Prisco's death, vice-chairman since 1962.

In the second part of season, Inter showed signs of exhaustion: 1–2 home loss to Atalanta was followed, on Thursday, by European elimination. Before the last league game, against Lazio, Inter was still at the top, with one point over Juventus and two over Roma. In the first half, Inter scored twice, but both goals were equalized by Lazio's Poborsky. During second half of the match, Lazio - still in race for a UEFA Cup spot - scored another two goals, eventually winning the match. Inter fell to third place, enough to qualify for next season's Champions League playoff. The Lazio-Inter game also marked Ronaldo's last appearance with Inter.

== First-team squad ==
Squad at end of season.

Note: Flags indicate national team as defined under FIFA eligibility rules; some limited exceptions apply. Players may hold more than one non-FIFA nationality.

No.	Pos.	Nation	Player
1	GK	ITA	Francesco Toldo
2	DF	COL	Iván Córdoba
3	FW	SLE	Mohamed Kallon
4	DF	ARG	Javier Zanetti (captain)
5	DF	ITA	Pasquale Padalino
6	MF	ITA	Cristiano Zanetti
7	MF	POR	Sérgio Conçeicão
8	MF	ESP	Francisco Farinós
9	FW	BRA	Ronaldo
10	MF	NED	Clarence Seedorf
11	MF	ARG	Guly
12	GK	ITA	Alberto Fontana
13	DF	CRO	Dario Šimić
14	MF	ITA	Luigi Di Biagio
15	DF	ITA	Salvatore Ferraro
16	DF	URU	Gonzalo Sorondo

No.	Pos.	Nation	Player
17	DF	ITA	Michele Serena
18	MF	FRA	Stéphane Dalmat
19	MF	ITA	Nicola Beati
20	FW	URU	Álvaro Recoba
21	MF	GRE	Grigorios Georgatos
22	GK	FRA	Mathieu Moreau
23	DF	ITA	Marco Materazzi
24	DF	SVK	Vratislav Greško
25	DF	FRA	Laurent Blanc
28	FW	BRA	Adriano
30	FW	NGA	Obafemi Martins
31	DF	ARG	Nelson Vivas
32	FW	ITA	Christian Vieri
33	MF	TUR	Emre Belözoğlu
77	MF	TUR	Okan Buruk
78	FW	ITA	Nicola Ventola

=== Transfers ===
In
Pos.	Name	from	Type
MF	Andres Guly	AC Milan	
MF	Sérgio Conceição	Parma	€18.00 million
FW	Nicola Ventola	Atalanta	loan ended
GK	Francesco Toldo	Fiorentina	(U$26,0 million)
DF	Marco Materazzi	Perugia	(U$12 million)
DF	Gonzalo Sorondo	Defensor Sporting	(U$9 million)
DF	Nelson Vivas	Arsenal	€7.00 million
DF	Pasquale Padalino	Bologna	loan
MF	Okan Buruk	Galatasaray	free
MF	Emre Belözoğlu	Galatasaray	free
GK	Alberto Fontana	Napoli	(U$3 million)
DF	Salvatore Fresi	Napoli	loan ended
FW	Mohamed Kallon	Vicenza	loan ended
MF	Cristiano Zanetti	Roma	loan ended
DF	Grigorios Georgatos	Olympiacos	loan ended
DF	Martin Rivas	Malaga	loan ended
FW	Anselmo Robbiati	Perugia	loan ended

Out
Pos.	Name	To	Type
DF	Christian Panucci	Roma	
MF	Andrea Pirlo	AC Milan	(U$17,0 million)
MF	Cristian Brocchi	AC Milan	
DF	Cyril Domoraud	AC Milan	
GK	Sébastien Frey	Parma	€21.00 million
DF	Matteo Ferrari	Parma	co-ownership
FW	Corrado Colombo	Atalanta	
DF	Laurent Blanc	Manchester United	free
FW	Adrian Mutu	Hellas Verona	€2,633 million
MF	Benoît Cauet	Torino	
FW	Marco Ferrante	Torino	loan ended
MF	Vladimir Jugović	Monaco	
GK	Marco Ballotta	Modena	
DF	Bruno Cirillo	Lecce	co-ownership
DF	Fabio Macellari	Bologna	co-ownership
DF	Salvatore Fresi	Bologna	
MF	Sixto Peralta	Ipswich Town	loan

==== Winter ====
In
Pos.	Name	from	Type

Out
Pos.	Name	To	Type
FW	Adriano	Fiorentina	loan
FW	Antonio Pacheco	Espanyol	loan
FW	Hakan Şükür	Parma	
DF	Jonatan Binotto	Brescia	
DF	Martin Rivas	Peñarol	
FW	Anselmo Robbiati	Fiorentina	loan

==== Reserve squad ====
The following players did not make an appearance for the first team.

Note: Flags indicate national team as defined under FIFA eligibility rules; some limited exceptions apply. Players may hold more than one non-FIFA nationality.

No.	Pos.	Nation	Player
19	MF	ITA	Nicola Beati
39	GK	ITA	Alex Cordaz

No.	Pos.	Nation	Player
42	DF	ITA	Giovanni Pasquale
43	DF	ITA	Luca Perfetti

== Competitions ==
=== Serie A ===
Pos	Team	Pld	W	D	L	GF	GA	GD	Pts	Qualification or relegation
1	Juventus (C)	34	20	11	3	64	23	+41	71	Qualification to Champions League first group stage
2	Roma	34	19	13	2	58	24	+34	70	Qualification to Champions League first group stage
3	Internazionale	34	20	9	5	62	35	+27	69	Qualification to Champions League third qualifying round
4	Milan	34	14	13	7	47	33	+14	55	Qualification to Champions League third qualifying round
5	Chievo	34	14	12	8	57	52	+5	54	Qualification to UEFA Cup first round

Source: 2001–02 Serie A, Soccerway
Rules for classification: 1) Points; 2) Head-to-head points; 3) Head-to-head goal difference; 4) Goal difference; 5) Goals scored; 6) Draw. (Note: Head-to-head record is used only after all the matches between the teams in question have been played).
(C) Champions

==== Results by round ====
Round	1	2	3	4	5	6	7	8	9	10	11	12	13	14	15	16	17	18	19	20	21	22	23	24	25	26	27	28	29	30	31	32	33	34
Ground	H	A	H	A	H	A	H	A	H	A	H	A	A	H	H	A	H	A	H	A	H	A	A	H	A	H	A	H	A	H	H	A	H	A
Result	W	D	W	W	W	D	L	D	W	D	W	W	W	L	W	W	D	W	W	D	D	L	W	W	W	D	W	W	W	L	W	D	W	L
Position	2	4	3	3	1	1	3	4	2	2	2	1	1	3	1	1	2	2	1	2	3	3	2	1	1	2	2	1	1	1	1	1	1	3

Source: Competitive matches
A = Away; H = Home; W = Win; D = Draw; L = Loss; = Leader, 2002–03 UEFA Champions League Group stage; = 2002–03 UEFA Champions League Group stage; = 2002–03 UEFA Champions League Second qualifying round; = 2002–03 UEFA Cup First round

==== Matches ====
26 August 2001 1	Inter	4–1	Perugia	Milan
	Kallon 21', 45'; Vieri 91' (pen.), 94'; Guly (yellow card); Okan (yellow card)	Report	66' Vryzas; (yellow card) Mazzantini; (yellow card) Sogliano; (yellow card) Baiocco; (yellow card) Gatti; (red card) 90' Grosso	Stadium: Giuseppe Meazza; Attendance: 60.000; Referee: Treossi

9 September 2001 2	Parma	2–2	Inter	Parma
	Milošević 27'; Bonazzoli 85'	Report	10' Materazzi; 74'Ventola; (yellow card) Seedorf	Stadium: Il Tardini

16 September 2001 3	Inter	2–1	Venezia	Milan
	Cordoba (red card) 33'; Kallon (yellow card) (goal) 74'; Adriano 90'	Report	(red card) 43' Bettarini; 89' Maniero; (yellow card) Conteh	Stadium: San Siro

23 September 2001 4	Torino	0–1	Inter	Turin
	Delli Carri (yellow card)	Report	73' (pen.) Kallon; (yellow card) Materazzi	Stadium: Stadio delle Alpi; Referee: Stefano Farina

30 September 2001 5	Inter	1–0	Bologna	Milan
	Georgatos 24' (yellow card); Toldo (yellow card)	Report	(yellow card) Pagliuca; (yellow card) Macellari; (yellow card) Zauli; (yellow card) 84' (yellow-red card) Pecchia	Stadium: Stadio Giuseppe Meazza; Referee: Stefano Farina

14 October 2001 7	Udinese	1–1	Inter	Udine
	Di Michele 88' (pen.); Caballero (yellow card); Pinzi (yellow card)	Report	61' Ventola; (red card) 74' Dalmat; (yellow card) Di Biagio; (yellow card) Kallon	Stadium: Stadio Friuli; Referee: Trentalange

21 October 2001 8	Inter	2–4	AC Milan	Milan
	Ventola 13'; Kallon 90' (yellow card); Vivas (yellow card); Materazzi (yellow card)	Report	59', 77' Shevchenko; 61' Contra; 66' F. Inzaghi; Laursen (yellow card); Contra (yellow card)	Stadium: Giuseppe Meazza; Referee: Pierluigi Collina

27 October 2001 9	Juventus	0–0	Inter	Turin
	Tacchinardi (yellow card)	Report	(yellow card) Cordoba; (yellow card) Materazzi; (yellow card) Di Biagio; (yellow card) Zanetti C.	Stadium: Delle Alpi; Referee: Braschi

4 November 2001 10	Inter	2–0	Lecce	Milan
	Kallon 36'; Di Biagio 42' (yellow card); Materazzi (yellow card); Zanetti J. (yellow card)	Report	(yellow card) Stovini; (yellow card) Popescu; (yellow card) Superbi; (yellow card) Chevanton	Stadium: Giuseppe Meazza; Referee: Messina

17 November 2001 11	Roma	0–0	Inter	Roma
	Zebina (yellow card); Candela (yellow card)	Report	(yellow card) Zanetti J. (yellow card) Di Biagio; (yellow card) Sorondo	Stadium: Olimpico; Referee: Rosetti

25 November 2001 12	Inter	2–0	Fiorentina	Milan
	Kallon 43'; Vieri 55'; Gresko (yellow card)	Report	(yellow card) Amaral	Stadium: Giuseppe Meazza; Referee: Rodomonti

2 December 2001 13	Atalanta	2–4	Inter	Bergamo
	Doni 15', 21' (pen.); Sala (yellow card); Zenoni (yellow card); Colombo (yellow card)	Report	8' (yellow card) Di Biagio; 60', 74' (pen.) Vieri; 79' Kallon; (yellow card) Conceicao	Stadium: Stadio Atleti Azzurri d'Italia; Referee: Braschi

9 December 2001 14	Brescia	1–3	Inter	Brescia
	Tare 20'; A. Filippini (yellow card); Giunti (yellow card)	Report	Ronaldo 18'; Vieri 63', 70' (yellow card); (yellow card) Gresko; (yellow card) Okan; (yellow card) Zanetti C.	Stadium: Stadio Mario Rigamonti; Referee: Rodomonti

15 December 2001 15	Inter	1–2	Chievo	Milan
	Vieri 25'; (yellow card) Cordoba; (yellow card) Di Biagio	Report	20' Corradi; 54' Marazzina; (yellow card) Eriberto; (yellow card) Corini	Stadium: Giuseppe Meazza; Referee: Rosetti

19 December 2001 6	Inter	3–0	Verona	Milan
	Vieri 18'; Ronaldo 50', 55'; Cordoba (yellow card); Di Biagio (yellow card); C. Zanetti (yellow card)	Report	(yellow card) Zanchi; (yellow card) Colucci	Stadium: Giuseppe Meazza; Referee: Treossi
Note: Scheduled on 7 October 2001. It was postponed due to Inter's European campaign.

23 December 2001 16	Piacenza	2–3	Inter	Piacenza
	Guardalben (red card) 43'; Lucarelli (red card) 45+2'; Gautieri 55'; Gautieri 74'; Statuto (yellow card); Di Francesco (yellow card); Cristante (yellow card)	Report	45' (pen.) Vieri; (red card) 45+2' Cordoba; 67' Ronaldo; 69' Kallon; 83' Vieri; (yellow card) Guly; (yellow card) Vivas	Stadium: Stadio Leonardo Garilli; Referee: Braschi

6 January 2002 17	Inter	0–0	Lazio	Milan
	Okan (yellow card); Emre (yellow card)	Report	(yellow card) Marchegiani; (yellow card) Favalli	Stadium: Giuseppe Meazza; Referee: Messina

13 January 2002 18	Perugia	0–2	Inter	Perugia
	(yellow card) Sogliano; (yellow card) Bazzani; (yellow card) Vryzas	Report	58' Vieri; 73' Recoba; (yellow card) Gresko; (yellow card) Di Biagio; (yellow card) Guly	Stadium: Stadio Renato Curi; Referee: Farina

20 January 2002 19	Inter	2–0	Parma	Milan
	Sensini 2' (o.g.); Vieri 84'	Report	(yellow card) Almeyda	Stadium: Giuseppe Meazza; Referee: Rosetti

27 January 2002 20	Venezia	1–1	Inter	Venice
	Maniero 70' (pen.); Vannucchi (yellow card)	Report	28' Vieri; (yellow card) C. Zanetti	Stadium: Stadio Pier Luigi Penzo; Referee: Rodomonti

2 February 2002 21	Inter	0–0	Torino	Milan
	Cordoba (yellow card); Di Biagio (yellow card); Conceicao (yellow card)	Report	(yellow card) Delli Carri; (yellow card) Vergassola; (yellow card) Castellini	Stadium: Giuseppe Meazza; Referee: Treossi

10 February 2002 22	Bologna	2–1	Inter	Bologna
	Pecchia 55'; Zauli 73'; Fresi (yellow card); Castellini (yellow card); Brioschi (yellow card)	Report	88' Seedorf; (yellow card) Sorondo; (yellow card) Materazzi; (yellow card) Georgatos; (yellow card) C. Zanetti	Stadium: Stadio Renato Dall'Ara; Referee: Collina

17 February 2002 23	Verona	0–3	Inter	Verona
		Report	C. Zanetti 32' (yellow card); Vieri 53', 88'; Materazzi (yellow card); Di Biagio (yellow card)	Stadium: Stadio Marc'Antonio Bentegodi; Referee: Farina

24 February 2002 24	Inter	3–2	Udinese	Milan
	Vieri 27'; Ventola 68'; Conceição 86'	Report	Muzzi 80'; Pinzi 88'	Stadium: San Siro; Referee: Braschi

3 March 2002 25	AC Milan	0–1	Inter	Milan
	Contra (yellow card); Rui Costa (yellow card)	Report	78' (yellow card) Vieri; (yellow card) Materazzi; (yellow card) C. Zanetti; (yellow card) Seedorf	Stadium: San Siro; Referee: Pierluigi Collina

9 March 2002 26	Inter	2–2	Juventus	Milan
	Seedorf 6', 90'; Cordoba (yellow card); Materazzi (yellow card); Di Biagio (yellow card)	Report	13' Trezeguet; 81' Tudor; (yellow card) Pessotto; (yellow card) Conte; (yellow card) Nedved	Stadium: Giuseppe Meazza; Referee: Borriello

17 March 2002 27	Lecce	1–2	Inter	Lecce
	Vugrinec (penalty missed) 76'; Vugrinec 90'; Stovini (yellow card); Giacomazzi (yellow card)	Report	40', 67' Recoba; (yellow card) Guly; (yellow card) Seedorf; (yellow card) Dalmat	Stadium: Stadio Via del Mare; Referee: De Santis
Note: Toldo blocked a penalty shoot-out by Vugrinec at 76'.

24 March 2002 28	Inter	3–1	Roma	Milan
	Recoba 2'; Vieri 43'; Recoba 72'; Emre (yellow card) 93' (yellow-red card); Materazzi (yellow card); Di Biagio (yellow card)	Report	57', (yellow card) Totti; (yellow card) 78' (yellow-red card) Zebina; (yellow card) Cafu; (yellow card) Del Vecchio; (yellow card) Assuncao	Stadium: Giuseppe Meazza; Referee: Cesari

30 March 2002 29	Fiorentina	0–1	Inter	Florence
	Pierini (yellow card)	Report	61' Vieri; (yellow card) Gresko	Stadium: Artemio Franchi

7 April 2002 30	Inter	1–2	Atalanta	Milan
	Vieri 47'; Seedorf (yellow card)	Report	44' Sala; 62' Berretta; (yellow card) Zauri; (yellow card) Rossini; (yellow card) Natali; (yellow card) Colombo	Stadium: San Siro

14 April 2002 31	Inter	2–1	Brescia	Milan
	Ronaldo 80', 83'; Emre (yellow card)	Report	29' (pen.) Guardiola; (yellow card) Bonera; (yellow card) Petruzzi; (yellow card) Bachini; (yellow card) Luca Toni; (yellow card) Igli Tare	Stadium: San Siro

21 April 2002 32	Chievo	2–2	Inter	Verona
	Marazzina 41'; Cossato 90'; Perrotta (yellow card); Corradi (yellow card)	Report	46' Dalmat; 60' Ronaldo; (yellow card) Toldo; (yellow card) Zanetti J (yellow card) Cordoba; (yellow card) Zanetti C (yellow card) Gresko	Stadium: Stadio Marc'Antonio Bentegodi

28 April 2002 33	Inter	3–1	Piacenza	Milan
	Córdoba 7', (yellow card); Recoba 70'; Ronaldo 80'; Gresko (yellow card)	Report	36' Matuzalém; (red card) 69' Sommese; (red card) 80' Matuzalém; (yellow card) Sacchetti; (yellow card) Hubner	Stadium: Giuseppe Meazza; Attendance: 75,000; Referee: Borriello

5 May 2002 34	Lazio	4–2	Inter	Rome
	Poborský 19', 45'; Simeone 55'; S. Inzaghi 73'	Report	Vieri 12'; Di Biagio 24'	Stadium: Stadio Olimpico; Attendance: 60,000

=== Coppa Italia ===
==== Eightfinals ====
12 November 2001 1	Udinese	2–1	Inter	Udine
20:45 CET	Di Michele 71'; Pizarro 83'	Report	30' Seedorf	Stadium: Friuli; Referee: Paolo Bertini

29 November 2001 2	Inter	2–2	Udinese	Milan
20:45 CET	Ventola 10'; J. Zanetti 18'	Report	41' Muzzi; 78' Jørgensen	Stadium: Stadio Giuseppe Meazza; Referee: Matteo Trefoloni

=== UEFA Cup ===
==== First round ====
20 September 2001	Inter Milan (Italy)	3–0	(Romania) Brașov	Stadio Nereo Rocco, Trieste
21:00 CET	Dalmat 23'; Kallon 31'; Di Biagio 41'	Report		Referee: Fernando Mendez (Spain)

27 September 2001	Brașov (Romania)	0–3	(Italy) Inter Milan	Stadionul Tineretului, Brașov
			Ventola 14', 79'; Guly 36'

Inter Milan won 6–0 on aggregate.

==== Second round ====
18 October 2001	Inter Milan (Italy)	2–0	(Poland) Wisła Kraków	Stadio Nereo Rocco, Trieste
21:00	Kallon 61', 65'	Report		Referee: Leslie Irvine (Northern Ireland)

30 October 2001	Wisła Kraków (Poland)	1–0	(Italy) Inter Milan	Wisła Stadium, Kraków
13:00	Żurawski 4'	Report		Referee: Paulo Paraty (Portugal)

Inter Milan won 2–1 on aggregate.

==== Third round ====
22 November 2001	Ipswich Town (England)	1–0	(Italy) Inter Milan	Portman Road, Ipswich
20:45	Armstrong 81'	Report		Referee: Kim Milton Nielsen (Denmark)

6 December 2001	Inter Milan (Italy)	4–1	(England) Ipswich Town	Stadio Giuseppe Meazza, Milan
21:00	Vieri 19', 34', 71'; Kallon 46'	Report	Armstrong 79' (pen.)	Referee: Graham Barber (England)

Inter Milan won 4–2 on aggregate.

==== Fourth round ====
21 February 2002	Inter Milan (Italy)	3–1	(Greece) AEK Athens	San Siro, Milan
21:00	J. Zanetti 14'; Kallon 37'; Ventola 56'	Report	Zagorakis 8'	Referee: Graham Poll (England)

28 February 2002	AEK Athens (Greece)	2–2	(Italy) Inter Milan	Nikos Goumas Stadium, Nea Filadelfeia
20:30	Konstantinidis 23'; Nikolaidis 56'	Report	Greško 20'; Ventola 57'	Referee: Karl-Erik Nilsson (Sweden)

Inter Milan won 5–3 on aggregate.

==== Quarter-finals ====
14 March 2002	Inter Milan (Italy)	1–1	(Spain) Valencia	San Siro, Milan
21:00	Materazzi 50'	Report	Rufete 66'	Attendance: 24,184; Referee: Markus Merk (Germany)

21 March 2002	Valencia (Spain)	0–1	(Italy) Inter Milan	Estadio Mestalla
21:45		Report	4' Ventola; (yellow card) 87' (yellow-red card) Toldo	Attendance: 50,000; Referee: (France) Claude Colombo
Note: Due to Goalkeeper Toldo was sent off at 87' and no substitutions for Inter remained, central midfielder Francisco Javier Farinos lined up as Goalkeeper until minute 95 of the match.

Inter Milan won 2–1 on aggregate.

==== Semi-finals ====
4 April 2002	Inter Milan (Italy)	0–1	(Netherlands) Feyenoord	Milan
21:00	Cordoba (yellow card) 24'; Materazzi (yellow card) 73'	Report	(yellow card) 30' Ono; (yellow card) 40' Rzasa; 51' (o.g.) Córdoba	Stadium: Giuseppe Meazza; Attendance: 39,622; Referee: (Slovakia) Ľuboš Micheľ

11 April 2002	Feyenoord (Netherlands)	2–2	(Italy) Inter Milan	De Kuip, Rotterdam
20:30	Van Hooijdonk 17'; Tomasson 34'	Report	C. Zanetti 83'; Kallon 89' (pen.)	Attendance: 49,904; Referee: Antonio Jesús López Nieto (Spain)

Feyenoord won 3–2 on aggregate.

== Statistics ==
=== Appearances and goals ===
As of 30 June 2002

No.	Pos	Nat	Player	Total		Serie A		Coppa Italia		UEFA Cup	
No.	Pos	Nat	Player	Apps	Goals	Apps	Goals	Apps	Goals	Apps	Goals
1	GK	(Italy) ITA	Toldo	43	0	33	0	1	0	9	0
4	DF	(Argentina) ARG	Zanetti J	44	2	33	0	1	1	10	1
2	DF	(Colombia) COL	Cordoba	42	1	30	1	1	0	11	0
23	DF	(Italy) ITA	Materazzi	32	2	23	1	1	0	8	1
24	DF	(Slovakia) SVK	Gresko	34	1	23	0	2	0	8+1	1
7	MF	(Portugal) POR	Conçeicão	32	1	16+7	1	0+1	0	5+3	0
6	MF	(Italy) ITA	Zanetti C	33	2	25+1	1	1	0	6	1
14	MF	(Italy) ITA	Di Biagio	42	4	31	3	1+1	0	8+1	1
11	MF	(Argentina) ARG	Guly	33	1	20+3	0	2	0	8	1
32	FW	(Italy) ITA	Vieri	28	25	25	22	0+1	0	2	3
3	FW	(Sierra Leone) SLE	Kallon	39	15	16+12	9	0	0	10+1	6
12	GK	(Italy) ITA	Fontana	5	0	1	0	1	0	3	0
10	MF	(Netherlands) NED	Seedorf	32	4	17+3	3	0+2	1	6+4	0
20	FW	(Uruguay) URU	Recoba	22	6	15+3	6	0	0	1+3	0
78	FW	(Italy) ITA	Ventola	26	10	12+3	4	2	1	7+2	5
18	MF	(France) FRA	Dalmat	24	1	11+5	1	1	0	4+3	0
9	FW	(Brazil) BRA	Ronaldo	15	7	9+1	7	0	0	1+4	0
21	DF	(Greece) GRE	Georgatos	12	1	9+1	1	0	0	1+1	0
16	DF	(Uruguay) URU	Sorondo	12	0	8+3	0	1	0	0	0
13	DF	(Croatia) CRO	Simic	21	0	6+6	0	1	0	5+3	0
8	MF	(Spain) ESP	Farinos	16	0	5+5	0	1	0	4+1	0
77	MF	(Turkey) TUR	Okan	11	0	3+4	0	1	0	3	0
31	DF	(Argentina) ARG	Vivas	16	0	1+12	0	0	0	2+1	0
33	MF	(Turkey) TUR	Emre	20	0	0+13	0	1	0	5+1	0
17	DF	(Italy) ITA	Serena	2	0	2	0	0	0	0	0
5	DF	(Italy) ITA	Padalino	1	0	0	0	1	0	0	0
15	DF	(Italy) ITA	Ferraro	2	0	0+1	0	0	0	1	0
22	GK	(France) FRA	Moreau	0	0	0	0	0	0	0	0
Players transferred out during the season
15	MF	(France) FRA	Cauet	1	0	0	0	0	0	0+1	0
28	FW	(Brazil) BRA	Adriano	14	1	0+8	1	1	0	4+1	0

Last updated: 10 May 2002
Source: Competitions
