= Kemokai Kallon =

Sierra Leonean footballer

Personal information
- Date of birth: 17 March 1972 (age 54)
- Place of birth: Kenema, Sierra Leone
- Position: Centre-back

Senior career*
Years	Team	Apps	(Gls)
1994	AS Kaloum Star		
1997	Ljungskile SK	1	(0)
1997	Norrby IF	4	(1)
1999–2000	Safa		(0)
2000–2001	Tadamon Sour		(1)
2006–2011	Kallon F.C.		
2011–2012	Belvic United		

International career
1992–2006	Sierra Leone	52	(4)
- * Club domestic league appearances and goals

Kemokai Kallon (born 17 March 1972 in Kenema, Sierra Leone) is a Sierra Leonean former professional footballer who played as a centre-back for Kallon F.C. He is the older brother of the Sierra Leonean international footballer Mohamed Kallon and the younger brother of the former Sierra Leonean international footballer Musa Kallon.

At club level, he made an appearance for Ljungskile SK in Sweden in 1997, and in the same year went on to play for Norrby IF, where he made four appearances and scored one goal. At international level, he was a member of the Sierra Leone national team at the 1994 African Nations Cup in Tunisia and the 1996 African Nations Cup in South Africa. He announced his retirement from international football in 2006 at age 34.
