= Kenema District =

- District
- Location of Kenema District in Sierra Leone
- Country: Sierra Leone
- Province: Eastern Province
- Capital: Kenema

Government
  - Type: District Council

Area
  - Total: 6,053 km^{2} (2,337 sq mi)

Population (2021 census)
  - Total: 772,472
  - Density: 127.6/km^{2} (330.5/sq mi)
- Time zone: UTC+0 (GMT)

Kenema District is a district in the Eastern Province of Sierra Leone. Its capital and largest city is Kenema. The district is one of the most populous in the country and serves as a major centre for agriculture, mining, and regional trade.

According to the 2021 Population and Housing Census conducted by Statistics Sierra Leone, the district has a population of 772,472.

== Geography ==
Kenema District is located in southeastern Sierra Leone and covers approximately 6,053 square kilometres.

It borders Bo District to the west, Tonkolili District and Kono District to the north, Kailahun District to the east, Pujehun District to the southwest, and the Republic of Liberia to the southeast.

The district lies within a tropical rainforest zone characterised by high rainfall and fertile soils.

== Administrative structure ==
Kenema District operates under Sierra Leone’s decentralised governance system, combining elected district councils with traditional chiefdom authorities.

The Kenema District Council is responsible for development planning and service delivery.

== Demographics ==
The population of Kenema District is predominantly from the Mende ethnic group, alongside Temne, Limba, Mandingo, and Fulla communities.

The district has a Muslim majority and a significant Christian minority.

Languages commonly spoken include Mende, Krio, and English.

== Economy ==
The economy of Kenema District is based on agriculture, mining, and trade.

=== Agriculture ===
Agriculture is the dominant livelihood in the district, with more than half of the population dependent on farming.

According to Statistics Sierra Leone’s Annual Agricultural Survey: - Kenema District accounts for approximately **11.7% of total crop land area** in the country, one of the highest shares nationally. - The district recorded about **151,690 agricultural holdings**, the highest in Sierra Leone.

Eastern Sierra Leone, including Kenema District, is a major production zone for cocoa, coffee, and oil palm, forming a core part of the country’s export agriculture.

=== Mining ===
Kenema District is historically associated with diamond mining and remains part of Sierra Leone’s principal alluvial diamond-producing region.

Mining activity, including artisanal and small-scale operations, contributes to employment and local revenue but is also associated with environmental and land-use challenges.

=== Trade ===
Kenema city functions as a regional commercial hub, linking agricultural production areas with national and cross-border markets.

== Major towns ==
Major towns in Kenema District include:

- Kenema
- Tongo
- Blama
- Yomboma

Additional settlements include Boajibu, Ngegbema, and Tungeh.

== Government and politics ==
Kenema District is governed by an elected district council headed by a council chairman.

The district is represented in the Parliament of Sierra Leone by multiple members.

== History ==
Kenema District has historically been a centre of trade and settlement in southeastern Sierra Leone.

During the colonial period, infrastructure development and agricultural expansion contributed to the growth of Kenema as a regional centre.

The district was significantly affected during the Sierra Leone Civil War (1991–2002), particularly due to its proximity to diamond-producing areas.

== Infrastructure and services ==
Infrastructure varies between urban and rural areas. Kenema city contains key services such as hospitals, schools, and administrative institutions, while rural areas have more limited access.

Transport is primarily road-based, with seasonal rainfall affecting accessibility.

== Development context ==
Kenema District plays a central role in Sierra Leone’s agricultural economy but faces challenges related to infrastructure, environmental management, and employment.

Development initiatives by government and international partners have focused on agriculture, governance, and service delivery.

== See also ==
- Eastern Province, Sierra Leone
- Kenema
- Districts of Sierra Leone

== Major towns ==
Kenema District has four cities with a population of at least 40,000.

- Kenema
- Blama
- Tongo
- Yomboma

== Government ==
Kenema District is governed with a district council form of government, which is headed by a District Council Chairman, who is the highest local government official in the district. The District Council Chairman is responsible for the general management of the district. The District Council Chairman is elected directly by the residents of Kenema District every four years. The current District Council Chairman of Kenema District Council is Senesi Manssary of the Sierra Leone People's Party (SLPP), who easily won the 2012 District Chairperson election with 80.30%, defeating his main opponent Doris Saffa Nyangbe of the All People's Congress (APC) who took 15.49%.

Kenema District is a reliable political stronghold of the Sierra Leone People's Party (SLPP), the main opposition party in Sierra Leone. The District overwhelmingly supports the SLPP by a large majority in Presidential, Parliamentary and local councils elections. The SLPP have won every Sierra leone presidential elections in the District by a large majority; including the 2012 Presidential election, when the SLPP presidential candidate Julius Maada Bio won 77.9% of the vote in the District, as he easily defeated the incumbent president Ernest Bai Koroma in the District who took only 18.7%.

=== Members of Parliament ===
Kenema District currently has eleven directly elected Representatives in the Sierra Leone House of Parliament; and ten of the eleven members belong to the Sierra Leone People's Party (SLPP).

== Demographics ==
The estimated population of Kenema District was 515,461. Kenema District population is ethnically divers, although the Mende people make up the largest ethnic group. The district of Kenema enjoys religious plurality - Muslim and Christians. Since the emergence of the Second Liberian Civil War in 1999, Kenema District along with Bo District served more than 60,000 Liberian refugees

Religion in Kenema District (2015)
Religion	Percent(%)
Islam	86.7%
Christianity	12.8%
Baháʼí	0.0%
Traditional African religions	0.0%
Other	0.4%
No religion	0.1%

== Economy ==
Kenema has a mixed economy, made up of gold and diamond mining as well as agricultural production of coffee, cacao and rice.

== Sport ==
Kenema is home to Sierra Leonean Premier League club the Kamboi Eagles. The club won the Sierra Leonean FA Cup in 1981, 1985, and 2014.

== Notable people from Kenema District ==
- J. B. Dauda, Sierra Leone Minister of Finance
- Mohamed Kallon, football star
- Paul Kpaka, football star
- Patrick Daniel Koroma, Bishop of Kenema
- Andrew Lungay, Politician
- Emmerson Bockarie, Musician

== Administrative divisions ==
=== Chiefdoms ===
==== Pre-2017 ====
Prior to the 2017 local administrative reorganization, Kenema District was made up of sixteen chiefdoms as the third level of administrative subdivision.

1. Dama – Giema
2. Dodo – Dodo
3. Gaura – Joru
4. Gorama Mende – Tungie
5. Kandu Leppiam – Gbado
6. Koya – Baoma
7. Langurama Ya – Baima
8. Lower Bambara – Panguma
9. Malegohun – Sembehun
10. Niawa – Sundumei
11. Nomo – Faama
12. Nongowa – Kenema
13. Simbaru – Boajibu
14. Small Bo – Blama
15. Tunkia – Gorahun
16. Wando – Faala

==== Post-2017 ====
After the 2017 local administrative reorganization, Kenema District was made up of seventeen chiefdoms as the third level of administrative subdivision.

1. Dama – Giema
2. Dodo – Dodo
3. Gaura – Joru
4. Gorama Mende – Tungea
5. Kandu Leppiam – Gbado
6. Koya – Baoma
7. Langurama Ya – Baima
8. Lower Bambara – Panguma
9. Malegohun – Sembehun
10. Niawa – Sundumei
11. Nomo – Faama
12. Nongowa – ?
13. Simbaru – Boajibu
14. Small Bo – Blama
15. Tunkia – Gorahun
16. Wando – Faala
17. Kenema City (Note: Formerly part of Nongowa Chiefdom.) – Kenema

=== Major towns ===
- Barma
- Blama
- Boajibu
- Giehun
- Gorahun
- Hangha
- Kenema, capital and largest city
- Panguma
- Pendemu
- Tokpombu
- Tongo, Second largest city
- Wuima
- Yomboma
