= Abu Sankoh =

Sierra Leonean football manager

Abu Sankoh is a Sierra Leonean football manager. He is the manager of Kallon F.C., a club he led to its first Sierra Leonean championship in 2006.

Sankoh previously managed the U-18 Sierra Leone national football team at the 2005 Meridian Cup.

== See also ==
- Football in Sierra Leone
- List of football clubs in Sierra Leone
