= Boajibu =

Town in Kenema District

Coordinates: 8°11′N 11°20′W

Boajibu is a town in Kenema District, in the Eastern Province of Sierra Leone. It is the Chiefdom Headquarters of the Simbaru Chiefdom. The current Paramount Chief of Simbaru Chiefdom is P.C Madam Mamie G. Gamanga. The present population of Boajibu is about 10,956 according to the 2023 Population and Housing Census of Sierra Leone.
