= Musa Kallon =

Sierra Leonean footballer (born 1970)

Personal information
- Date of birth: 8 April 1970 (age 56)
- Place of birth: Kenema, Sierra Leone
- Position: Midfielder

Senior career*
Years	Team	Apps	(Gls)
1986	Mighty Blackpool		
1987	East End Lions		
1988	Mighty Blackpool		
1989–1990	Union Douala		
1991–1993	RC Bafoussam		
1994–1995	Vanspor	12	(3)
1995–1996	Sportul Studențesc București	2	(0)
1996–1997	PSM Makassar		
1997–1998	Persikota Tangerang		
1998–1999	Persebaya Surabaya		

International career
1995–1996	Sierra Leone	4	(2)

Managerial career
- 2003: Sierra Leone U17
- 2004–2005: Kallon
- 2007: Central Parade
- 2015–2016: Old Edwardians
- * Club domestic league appearances and goals

Musa Kallon (born 8 April 1970) is a Sierra Leonean football coach and former player. He is the older brother of Sierra Leonean international footballers Mohamed Kallon, and Kemokai Kallon.

== Playing career ==
=== Club ===
Kallon was born in Kenema, Sierra Leone. He played as a midfielder for Vanspor (1994–1995) in Turkey, Sportul Studențesc București (1995–1996) in Romania, and PSM Makassar, Persikota Tangerang and Persebaya Surabaya (1996–1999) in Indonesia.

=== International ===
Kallon was capped several times for Sierra Leone between 1990 and 1998, and scored two goals in a 5–1 win against Niger to help Sierra Leone qualify for the 1996 African Cup of Nations in South Africa.

== Coaching career ==
After retiring as a player, Kallon also coached the Sierra Leone U-17 side in the 2003 FIFA U-17 World Championship in Finland after managing a second-place finish in the 2003 African U-17 Championship.

In 2007 he coached Central Parade.

Kallon coached Kallon F.C. to a runners up position in the 2004–05 League Championship. He fell out with his players, management and his younger brother, however, who later sacked him. In 2005, Kallon was banned for a year after forcefully stopping a league match between Kallon FC and Diamond Stars by letting his daughter sit down in the centre of the field, after the players refused to play under him.

On 9 February 2016, Kallon was sacked by Old Edwardians.

== Honours ==
=== Player ===
Mighty Blackpool

- Sierra Leone National Premier League: 1998
- Sierra Leonean FA Cup: 1988

Union Douala

- Cameroon Premiere Division: 1990

RC Bafoussam

- Cameroon Première Division: 1992, 1993
