= Lower Bambara Chiefdom =

Coordinates: 8°13′N 11°03′W

- Chiefdom
- Interactive map of Lower Bambara Chiefdom
- Country: Sierra Leone
- Province: Eastern Province
- District: Kenema District
- Capital: Baima
- Time zone: UTC+0 (GMT)

Lower Bambara Chiefdom is a chiefdom in Kenema District of Sierra Leone. Its capital is Baima.
