= Iruka Okeke =

Nigerian microbiologist

- Born: England
- Education: Obafemi Awolowo University
- Scientific career
- Fields: Pharmaceutical microbiology Science and technology studies
- Workplaces: University of Ibadan

Iruka Okeke is a Nigerian pharmaceutical microbiologist. Iruka is a professor in the Faculty of Pharmaceutical Sciences, and an adjunct professor in the College of Medicine, both in the University of Ibadan, Nigeria. Iruka's career is the study neglected enteric bacteria such as E. coli, known for their potential to cause fatal bloodstream and diarrheal infections. She advocates for the utilization of Genomics approaches to enhance surveillance and gain a better understanding of pathogen virulence. Okeke's research interests extend to combating antimicrobial resistance and investigating bacterial pathogenesis, epidemiology, and antimicrobial resistance of enteric bacteria. Iruka's contributions to the field have earned her recognition as a fellow of esteemed institutions such as the Nigerian Academy of Sciences, and African Academy of Sciences.

Okeke has received multiple awards including awards such as the American Society for Microbiology Moselio Schaechter Award 2023 in Recognition of a Developing-Country Microbiologist, The Peter Wildy Prize from the UK Microbiology Society 2024, and in 2025 was elected a Fellow of the American Academy of Microbiology.

== Life and education ==
Okeke was born in England to Nigerian parents, and later moved to Nigeria to pursue her secondary education. She earned her Bachelor of Pharmacy from Obafemi Awolowo University, in 1994, followed by her Master of Science in Pharmaceutics in 1998 at the same university. She later completed her Doctor of Philosophy degree from Obafemi Awolowo University in collaboration with the University of Maryland, USA, in 2000. Okeke later pursued a Ph.D. in Microbiology and Immunology, spending a year at the Center for Vaccine Development, as a Fulbright Scholar at the University of Maryland.

Okeke is married and has a daughter.

== Research career ==
Okeke carried out her postdoctoral research at the University of Maryland, USA and Uppsala University, Sweden. In 2000 she moved to the University of Bradford, England, as a teaching faculty member. She then moved to Haverford College, USA in 2002 as an associate professor before becoming a full Professor in 2014. During her time at Haverford she was a Branco Weiss Fellow of the Society of Science between 2004 and 2009, and a Fellow of the Institute for AdvancedStudies, Berlin from 2010 to 2011.

Her research has focused on using bacterial genetics to understand the molecular epidemiology, colonization, pathogenesis and antimicrobial resistance of enteric bacteria. She has studied the surface proteins of E. coli and described how these proteins help the bacteria colonize the gut.

In 2014, Okeke moved to the University of Ibadan, Nigeria, supported by the UK Medical Research Council and UK Department for International Development as an African Research Leader. In 2019 she was awarded funding from the Grand Challenge Africa drug discovery scheme to identify potential drugs compounds against bacterial disease She is also working on low-cost technology solutions to monitor antimicrobial resistance in low-income settings, with support from the Bill & Melinda Gates Foundation.

In 2017 she was appointed editor-in-chief of the African Journal of Laboratory Medicine.

== Awards and honours ==
- 2025 Fellow of the American Academy of Microbiology
- American Society for Microbiology Moselio Schaechter Award in Recognition of a Developing-Country Microbiologist, June 2024
- The Peter Wildy Prize. UK Microbiology Society, April 2023
- Calestous Juma Science Leadership Fellowship, Bill and Melinda Gates Foundation, 2021–2026
- Fellow of the Nigerian Academy of Science in 2018
- Pharmacy Ambassador in the Diaspora Award. Faculty of Pharmacy, Obafemi Awolowo University, Nigeria, 2014
- Mellon 23 Life Cycle of the Student Scholar Award for early curricular initiatives that serve to build the foundations of student scholarship, 2009
- Branco Weiss Fellowship. Society in Science, Eidgenössische Technische Hochschule (Swiss Federal Institute of Technology) Zürich, 2004–2009
- Nigerian Universities Postgraduate Thesis Award. National PhD thesis award – Science category, 2001
