= Wando Chiefdom =

- Chiefdom
- Country: Sierra Leone
- Province: Eastern Province
- District: Kenema District
- Capital: Faala
- Time zone: UTC+0 (GMT)

Wando Chiefdom is a chiefdom in Kenema District of Sierra Leone. Its capital is Faala.
