= Medical Emergency Relief International =

Former charitable medical organization

Merlin
- Merged into: Save the children in 2013
- Formation: 1993
- Founded: 1993
- Founder: Christopher Besse, Nicholas Mellor and Mark Dalton
- Dissolved: 16 June 2024
- Type: International charity
- Purpose: Primary Care, Public Health Education, Disaster Relief, International Health, Disease prevention, and Epidemiology
- Location: United Kingdom
- Region served: Global
- Method: Research, Emergency Health Guidelines, Infrastructure
- Employees: Around 4,000
- Website: www.merlin.org.uk
- Formerly called: Merlin Board Limited

Medical Emergency Relief International (MERLIN) was a British international nongovernmental health charity that provided medical experts for global emergencies. Operating in over 40 countries, it focused on medical aid, disease prevention, and healthcare infrastructure rebuilding. In 2013, MERLIN merged with Save the Children with all of its operations having ceased or been transferred by April 2016. The charity was dissolved on 16 July 2024.

== History ==
MERLIN was founded in 1993 by Christopher Besse, Nicholas Mellor, and Mark Dalton as a British charity dedicated to supporting and developing health services, particularly in crisis zones and following natural disasters. Its first mission in 1993 was as an informally organised effort to send £1 million worth of food rations to Bosnia. Merlin grew as a specialist charity aimed at responding to natural disasters and humanitarian emergencies, with the additional task of staying on to rebuild the capacity of local health services. Over the course of its existence, MERLIN worked in over 40 countries, with operations in at least 19 countries concurrently in 2012. It responded to some of the most serious humanitarian emergencies in recent history, including the 2004 Indian Ocean Tsunami, the War in Darfur, and Cyclone Nargis in Burma. MERLIN also responded to the 2010 Haiti earthquake and the flooding in Pakistan.

In July 2013, MERLIN merged with Save the Children. Save the Children absorbed all of MERLIN's operations by April 2016, with the last of MERLIN's assets being transferred by its dissolution on 16 July 2024.

== Notable activities by region ==
=== Africa ===
==== Democratic Republic of the Congo ====
MERLIN started working in the Democratic Republic of the Congo in 1997 when it began provided emergency assistance to refugees in the east of the country. From 2002 until its operations merged with Save the Children, the MERLIN charity worked with communities to rebuild over 100 health facilities, providing drugs and training local health staff, ensuring they have the medicines and the expertise to provide good quality health care. MERLIN also supported several hospitals, including Kindu Hospital, the largest in Maniema Province, treating 2,000 patients every month.

==== Kenya ====
MERLIN worked in Kenya beginning in 1998, running voluntary HIV testing and counseling clinics in Turkana for nomadic pastoralists, and a similar project which supports patients receiving antiretroviral treatment in the Great Rift Valley. Since many people with tuberculosis have also contracted HIV and vice versa, MERLIN worked with the Kenyan government to encourage HIV-positive people and TB patients to be tested for both infections. In Nyanza in the western highlands of Kenya, MERLIN trained locals to provide home-based care for HIV-positive people. After the re-appearance of malaria in Nyanza, MERLIN trained community health workers to identify, to reduce, and prevent malaria by raising awareness, distributing bed nets and spraying people's homes with insecticide.

==== Liberia ====
MERLIN health worker in Liberia

Due to a lack of qualified health workers, a dilapidated healthcare infrastructure, and insufficient government funding, Liberia's healthcare system is only now beginning to transition from an emergency to a development phase. From 1997 until its absorption by Save the Children, MERLIN collaborated with the Ministry of Health to renovate health facilities, supply essential medicines and equipment, and train and supervise healthcare workers.

==== Darfur ====
Patients queue to see a MERLIN doctor in South Sudan

Sudan: In 2004, when MERLIN's teams began establishing health services, most people displaced by the Darfur conflict had no access to medical care. Until its absorption by Save the Children, MERLIN operated a network of clinics serving eight settlements inundated by people fleeing the conflict. On average, 134,000 individuals received treatment every six months.

=== Middle East ===
==== Afghanistan ====
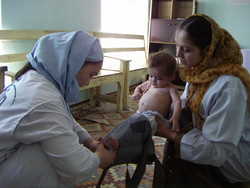
MERLIN maternal health clinic in Afghanistan

MERLIN began working in Afghanistan in 1994, providing essential health services to vulnerable populations in some of the most remote and hard-to-reach areas of the country. Reproductive healthcare in Afghanistan is particularly inadequate, resulting in some of the highest maternal and child mortality rates globally. At one point, only 14% of deliveries were attended by a trained midwife, and in isolated rural areas, women faced a one-in-three lifetime risk of dying during pregnancy or childbirth.

In April 2006, MERLIN opened a midwife training center in Taloqan, located in the northeastern province of Takhar. Since its establishment, numerous students have graduated and now deliver critical maternal healthcare services to more than 84,000 women.

==== Iran ====
The 2003 Bam earthquake: On 26 December 2003, an earthquake measuring 6.6 on the moment magnitude scale struck the ancient city of Bam in Iran, killing more than 26,000 people and leaving 75,000 homeless. MERLIN responded within 72 hours of the disaster, sending in a team to carry out health assessments and to distribute emergency medical supplies, hygiene packs, and essential water and sanitation items. MERLIN stayed in Bam for more than a year following the disaster and helped build or refurbish 32 medical houses and 11 health centers.

==== Iraq ====
MERLIN was one of the first international humanitarian organizations to enter Baghdad just days after the collapse of Saddam Hussein's regime in April 2003. Teams delivered emergency health kits and medical supplies to pediatric hospitals and health clinics throughout Baghdad, focusing on the most vulnerable groups such as women and children. MERLIN also helped train and equip local health authorities to restart their activities and rehabilitate their war-ravaged infrastructure. In many areas of Baghdad, water and sanitation systems had become very poorly maintained, with some areas regularly flooded by sewage. In response, MERLIN implemented water and sanitation projects, that helped approximately 35,000 people in the Greater Baghdad area.

==== Palestinian Territories ====
MERLIN worked in the Palestinian Territories from 2002 until its absorption by the Save the Children charity. MERLIN implemented programs in both Gaza and the West Bank, aiming to increase access to health care and improve rural health care, in particular. In 2007, MERLIN began operating exclusively in Qalqilya and Salfit districts of the West Bank, the areas most isolated by the separation barrier. Following the violence in the Gaza Strip in December 2008/January 2009. MERLIN increased community access to primary and specialist medical services through mobile and fixed clinics and improved the availability of safe blood supplies. It also conducted home visits and health education to reduce disease through early diagnosis.

=== North America ===
MERLIN launched an emergency response within 48 hours of the earthquake and mobilized a specialized surgical and medical team to Delmas 33, a suburb of Port-au-Prince. On an abandoned tennis court, MERLIN established a fully functional, tented surgical hospital. In partnership with Medicos del Mundo (MDM Spain), MERLIN also operated a mobile clinic team in and around the rural areas of Petit Goave and Grand Goave, two hours from the capital of Port-au-Prince. The mobile clinic circuit included seven villages, each of which are underserved with significant health needs. MERLIN's teams of doctors and nurses offered basic, maternal and neonatal health care, while referring more severe cases to local hospitals for secondary treatment as needed.

=== North Asia ===
Following the collapse of communism in the former Soviet Union, Russia experienced a 42% increase in cases of tuberculosis (TB). MERLIN worked for over ten years with TB patients at Tomsk in Siberia. MERLIN pioneered treatment methods, combining traditional systems with new home-based treatment, to combat the rise in the disease. The work was so successful that it was adopted by the Russian Ministry of Health as the nationwide flagship program for TB treatment. MERLIN also supported a hospital TB ward, and supported TB-infected prisoners with medical and social support before and after their release. At the close of programs, TB related incidents had fallen by 6% in Tomsk, whereas elsewhere in Russia they had risen by 10%.

In 2006 the Russian Federal Security Service accused MERLIN and other foreign NGOs of being covers for foreign intelligence gathering operations. However, this is reflective an overall trend of suspicion by the Russian government of NGOs, as in 2012 they passed a law requiring all politically active foreign NGOs to register as 'foreign agents' and to file quarterly reports on their finances.

=== Southeast Asia ===
==== Burma ====
MERLIN Response Team in Burma in the aftermath of Cyclone Nargis

The Irrawaddy Delta area of Burma was devastated by Cyclone Nargis in May 2008, leaving more than 130,000 people dead or missing and a million displaced. Since MERLIN teams were already working in Burma before the cyclone, they were among the first to deliver a response to the disaster, setting up first aid points in Laputta and treating at least 250 patients a day in the first week.

==== 2004 Indian Ocean tsunami ====
MERLIN arrived in Sri Lanka less than 48 hours after the 2004 Indian Ocean earthquake and tsunami and was the first international health non-governmental organization to plan a coordinated relief effort with the local Ministry of Health. They also had teams on the ground in Indonesia and Burma. By the end of 2007 MERLIN had helped an estimated 287,000 households in Ampara and Batticaloa, Sri Lanka, by constructing and rehabilitating clinics and hospitals damaged by conflict and the tsunami.

== Hands Up for Health Workers campaign ==
Campaign Logo

Hands Up for Health Workers was MERLIN's campaign to combat the global shortage of skilled health workers. MERLIN campaigned for national governments and international donors to develop national health workforce plans to train, equip, pay, and support health workers in crisis countries.

== Funding ==
The majority of MERLIN's funds came from institutional donors, which include the UK's Department for International Development, the United States Agency for International Development and the European Commission. As a member of the Disasters Emergency Committee (DEC), which coordinates fundraising appeals for major disasters overseas, MERLIN also received an allocation of the total amounts raised. A small but increasing percentage was voluntary income. This included private grant-making trusts and foundations, companies, and donations from members of the public. Individuals organized diverse fundraising events and were sponsored to take part in various "challenge events," such as:

- The London Marathon
- The Welsh 3000s
- The London to Paris Bike Ride
- The Run to the Beat Half Marathon
- The Great South Run
- Skydiving
