= Sheik Umar Khan =

Sierra Leonean virologist (1975–2014)

Sheikh Humarr Khan
- Born: 6 March 1975
- Died: 29 July 2014 (aged 39)
- Education: University of Sierra Leone
- Known for: Ebola isolation ward
- Medical career
- Profession: Chief Medical Officer
- Research: Lassa fever, Ebola

Sheik Umar Khan (6 March 1975 – 29 July 2014) was the chief Sierra Leonean doctor attempting to curb the country's Ebola outbreak in 2014.

The virologist is credited with treating over a hundred patients before succumbing to the virus himself. He was recognized as a "national hero" by Sierra Leone's Health Ministry. Khan had long worked with Lassa fever, a disease that kills over 5,000 a year in Africa. He had expanded his clinic to accept Ebola patients. Sierra Leone's president, Ernest Bai Koroma, celebrated Khan as a "national hero". He had a habit of hugging the cured Ebola patients that were leaving his ward, to lift their spirits.

== Early life and education ==
Graduated from University of Sierra Leone’s College of Medicine and Allied Health Sciences in 2001 and finished his internship in 2004, he became new chief physician of the Lassa Fever Research Program at Kenema Government Hospital in 2005 after his predecessor, Dr. Aniru Conteh, died from Lassa fever after a needlestick accident. Khan was a resident at the Korle-Bu Teaching Hospital from 2010 to 2013.

== Death ==
Khan was very meticulous in donning personal protective equipment as he treated patients. Believing the virus unable to be transmitted in an airborne fashion, he worked fearlessly with Ebola virus patients. Despite observing recommended protocols, Khan was infected by the virus and died on 29 July 2014 in a facility run by Medecins Sans Frontieres. He was not offered a dose of the experimental drug ZMapp though one was available. Sierra Leonean president Ernest Bai Koroma had been due to visit his treatment center the following week.

== Awards and honors ==
- On 18 December 2014, Khan was named one of Nature's 10 "people who mattered" of 2014, along with Maryam Mirzakhani, Radhika Nagpal, and others.
- In 2019, asteroid 6781 Sheikhumarrkhan, discovered by American astronomer Henry E. Holt at Palomar Observatory in 1990, was named in his memory. The official naming citation was published by the Minor Planet Center on 27 August 2019 (M.P.C. 115893) and revised on 25 March 2021 (M.P.C. 128947).
