= Paul Kpaka =

Sierra Leonean footballer (born 1981)

Personal information
- Full name: Paul Kpaka
- Date of birth: 7 August 1981 (age 45)
- Place of birth: Kenema, Sierra Leone
- Height: 1.77 m (5 ft 9 1/2 in)
- Position: Striker

Youth career
- Kamboi Eagles
- Degerfors
- Öster
- 1998–1999: Feyenoord

Senior career*
Years	Team	Apps	(Gls)
1999–2001	Brussels	56	(22)
2001–2003	Germinal Beerschot	59	(45)
2003–2006	Genk	43	(6)
2005–2006	→ RBC Roosendaal (loan)	29	(5)
2006–2008	Roeselare	58	(8)
2008–2010	Germinal Beerschot	19	(1)
2010	Enosis Neon Paralimni	5	(0)
2011	Chalkanoras Idaliou	7	(0)

International career
2002–2008	Sierra Leone	14	(5)
- * Club domestic league appearances and goals

Paul Kpaka (born 7 August 1981) is a Sierre Leonean former professional footballer who played as a striker.

== Early life ==
Paul Kpaka was born into the Sherbro Rogers family in Kenema, the third largest city in Sierra Leone. He is a member of the famous Sherbro Kpaka or Rogers family originally from Bonthe District. Kpaka grew up in Kenema and Bo. He attended Bo School in Bo, Sierra Leone's second largest city. Kpaka who is commonly known by his nickname Senegal and was considered the best secondary footballer in Sierra Leone. After he completed his secondary school education, his hometown club, Kamboi Eagles of the Sierra Leone National Premier League signed him.

== Club career ==
=== Germinal Beerschot ===
In 2002, Belgian club Germinal Beerschot signed him from FC Brussels, whom he had joined after playing for various clubs in Sweden and Feyenoord in the Netherlands. During his first season in Belgium, Kpaka was the top scorer in the Jupiler League, hitting 28 league goals in the 2002–03 campaign. He was third at the Ebony Shoe Award, an award given to the top African footballer in Belgium. He signed for fellow Belgian club Genk for the next season.

=== Genk ===
Kpaka was expected to lead Genk to the top two position in the Jupiler League, and take the club to the UEFA Champions League, but he suffered a cruciate ligament injury during the beginning of the season, which kept him out of football for six months. When he returned from injury, he could no longer secure a place in the starting eleven. He left the club in 2006–07 season and signed for another Belgian club Roeselare.

=== Return to GBA ===
After two seasons for Roeselare, Kpaka returned to Germinal Beerschot in summer 2008. However, after two unsuccessful seasons, his contract was not renewed, and he will therefore leave Germinal Beerschot on 1 July 2010.

=== In Cyprus ===
Kpaka finished his career with Cypriot clubs Enosis Neon Paralimni and Chalkanoras Idaliou in the Cyprus Division A.

== International career ==
Kpaka is a regular starter for Sierra Leone. He made his international debut for Sierra Leone in a 2004 African Nations Cup qualifier against Gabon on 12 October 2002. Sierra Leone won the match 2–0, with Kpaka scoring the first goal. Later on in the match, he got sent off for elbowing an opponent.
