= F.C. Kallon =

Association football club in Sierra Leone

FC Kallon
- Full name: Football Club Kallon
- Nickname: FCK
- Founded: 2002; 24 years ago
- Ground: National Stadium; Freetown, Sierra Leone
- Capacity: 45,000
- Owner: Mohamed Kallon
- Chairman: Sahr William Ngegba
- Manager: Charlie Wright and Musa Kallon
- League: Sierra Leone National Premier League
- 2025–26: 8th
Home colours

Football Club Kallon, commonly known as FC Kallon, is a football club based in Freetown, Sierra Leone. Founded as Sierra Fisheries, the club is one of the top clubs in the Sierra Leone National Premier League and play their home games at the National Stadium in Freetown. The venue has a capacity of 45,000.

== Honours ==
- Sierra Leone League: 4

1982, 1986, 1987 (as Sierra Fisheries)
2006

- Sierra Leonean FA Cup: 1

2007

== Performance in CAF competitions ==
- CAF Champions League: 1 appearance

2007 – First Round

- African Cup of Champions Clubs: 2 appearances

1983: Second Round
1988: Preliminary Round

- CAF Confederation Cup: 1 appearance

2012 –

== Players ==
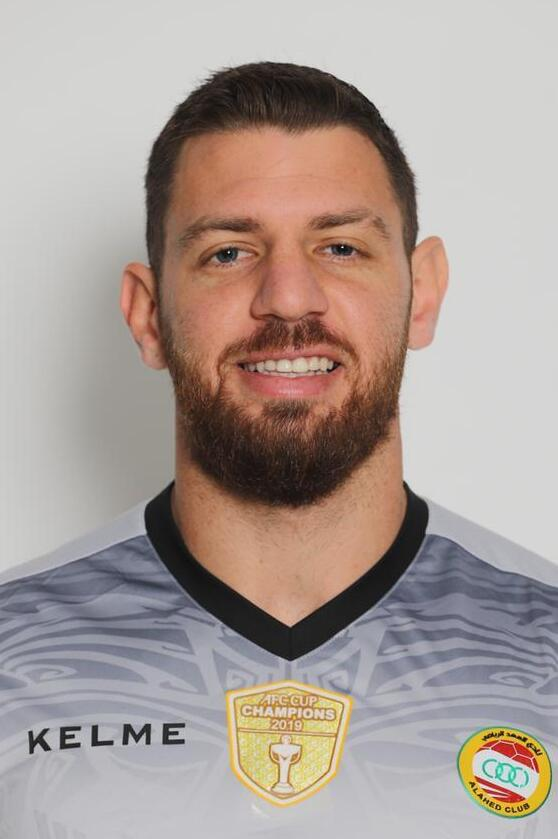
Mehdi Khalil, who was born in the Ivory Coast in 1991, signed with FC Kallon

== See also ==
- Abu Sankoh, Sierra Leonean football manager (2006)
