= Mohamed Kallon =

Sierra Leonean manager and former footballer (born 1979)

Personal information
- Date of birth: 6 October 1979 (age 47)
- Place of birth: Kenema, Sierra Leone
- Height: 1.79 m (5 ft 10 in)
- Position: Striker

Youth career
- 1993: Old Edwardians

Senior career*
Years	Team	Apps	(Gls)
1993–1994	Old Edwardians	13	(4)
1994–1995	Tadamon Sour	24	(15)
1995–1997	Lugano	32	(6)
1997	Bologna	2	(0)
1997–1998	Genoa	26	(10)
1998–1999	Cagliari	26	(6)
1999–2000	Reggina	30	(11)
2000–2001	Vicenza	25	(8)
2001–2004	Inter Milan	43	(14)
2004–2007	Monaco	48	(13)
2005–2006	→ Al-Ittihad (loan)	18	(11)
2008	AEK Athens	11	(3)
2008–2009	Al-Shaab	4	(1)
2009–2010	Kallon	11	(2)
2010	Shaanxi Chanba	21	(7)
2011	Viva Kerala		
2012–2014	Kallon		
Total		339	(114)

International career
1995–2012	Sierra Leone	40	(8)

Managerial career
- 2025–2026: Sierra Leone
- * Club domestic league appearances and goals

Mohamed Kallon MOR (born 6 October 1979) is a Sierra Leonean football manager and former player. A striker, Kallon played for Inter Milan from 2001 to 2004, and is widely considered the most famous footballer from Sierra Leone.

Before playing for Inter, Kallon had short stints at Lugano in Switzerland and at the Italian clubs Bologna, Genoa, Cagliari, Reggina and Vicenza. After leaving Inter in 2004, Kallon played at Monaco for three years. Following a spell in Greece with AEK Athens, he played in Saudi Arabia, the UAE, China and India.

Kallon made 39 appearances for Sierra Leone national team and with 8 goals is their joint top goalscorer. He is the younger brother of former Sierra Leonean international footballers Kemokai Kallon and Musa Kallon.

== Early life ==
Kallon was born on 6 October 1979 in Kenema, Sierra Leone. Kallon is the younger brother to former Sierra Leone international footballers Kemokai Kallon and Musa Kallon. Kallon attended primary school in Kenema and completed his secondary education at St. Edwards Secondary School in Freetown.

During his early international career for Sierra Leone, Kallon was given the nickname Small Kallon by Sierra Leonean football fans to distinguish him from his two elder brothers who also then played in the Sierra Leone national team.

== Club career ==
=== Early career ===
After he completed his form three levels of education (grade 9 in the U.S.) from St. Edwards Secondary School in Freetown, Kallon signed with the local club, Old Edwardians of the Sierra Leone National Premier League. During the 1993–94 season, he scored four goals in 13 league games for Old Edwardians and became the youngest player to ever play and score in Sierra Leone National Premier League.

After the 1993–94 season, Kallon left Old Edwardians and signed for Lebanese club Tadamon Sour. Kallon is indeed spotted by Ali Abdullah, while playing a game with friends, on a beach in Freetown. Son of a Lebanese diplomat living in Sierra Leone - Lebanon then already had many businessmen in West Africa - Abdullah praised Kallon's qualities to several relatives, and managed to obtain several trials for him in Lebanon.

Eager to discover foreign countries, and pushed by his father, Kallon accepts the offer and travels with Ali Abdullah, only 15 years old. First on the side of Ajman, where the test turns out to be inconclusive, before finally catching the eye of the staff of Tadamon Sour, the club from the city of Tire. Kallon will thus spend the 1994–95 season there, scoring 15 goals in 24 games, despite six difficult first months, due in particular to the cold Lebanese winter.

He spent one season with Spånga in Stockholm, Sweden. He was then signed by Inter Milan. He was then loaned to Swiss Super League club AC Lugano, Serie A club Bologna and Cagliari, as well as Serie B club Genoa. He was farmed to Reggina and Vicenza in a co-ownership deal for an undisclosed fee and 9,000 billion lire respectively (€4,648,112). He played with Cristiano Zanetti at Cagliari, whom he later worked with again at Inter Milan.

=== Inter Milan ===
==== 2001–02 ====
After the abolition of the non-EU quota for each team halfway through the 2000–01 season, Kallon returned to Italian club Inter Milan before the start of the 2001–02 season., for a reported 8,500 billion lire transfer fee (€4,389,884). With Christian Vieri, Ronaldo, Álvaro Recoba, Adriano, Hakan Şükür and Nicola Ventola also in the side, Kallon was originally a third or fourth choice striker. But injuries to Ronaldo and Recoba meant that Kallon played 29 Serie A matches, scoring nine goals and becoming the team's second highest scorer of the 2001–02 Serie A season, behind Vieri, as the club narrowly missed out on the league title, finishing in third place, also reaching the semi-finals of the UEFA Cup.

==== 2002–03 ====
He played nine times scoring five goals in Serie A in 2002–03 season due to injuries in August and February, as the team managed a second-place finish in the league. Kallon returned to the side in May after Gabriel Batistuta was injured in April. He also played both legs of the 2002–03 UEFA Champions League semi-final against AC Milan as Batistuta was unable to register. He played in both games as a second-half substitute, for Álvaro Recoba and Hernán Crespo respectively.

==== 2003–04 ====
Kallon tested positive for the banned substance nandrolone after the Serie A match against Udinese on 27 September 2003 and was banned from football for eight months. Kallon then struggled to get into the starting eleven during the 2003–04 season, primarily due to the rise of young Nigerian striker Obafemi Martins and the return of Brazilian ace Adriano.

=== Monaco ===
Kallon signed a four-year contract with Monégasque club Monaco before the start of the 2004–05 season, as the UEFA Champions League runners-up had lost Dado Pršo and Fernando Morientes. He was impressive during his first season at Monaco, but quickly fell out with French manager Didier Deschamps, and was relegated to the bench in March 2005.

He moved on loan to Saudi club Al-Ittihad on 29 July 2005. He helped the team win the 2005 AFC Champions League, leading the competition with six goals scored, including goals in each legs of the semi-final and final respectively. He also played at the 2005 FIFA Club World Championship with Al-Ittihad, before returning to Monaco in 2006.

He played 12 Ligue 1 matches in his last full season with Monaco during the 2006–07 campaign. He played his last match in league play on 11 August 2007 against Lorient, the second match of the season, before he was released by Monaco. He underwent a trial with Birmingham City in September 2007, after previously being linked with Derby County in July. However, Kallon failed to qualify for a work permit in England, as Sierra Leone ranked 79th in the FIFA World Rankings in September 1997, but the requirement was above 70th for non-EU internationals. In November 2007, he signed a pre-contract with Al Hilal, but this later collapsed.

=== AEK Athens ===
Kallon signed a six-month contract with Greek club AEK Athens on 29 January 2008. He played for the capital club in the UEFA Cup 2007–08 round of 32 against Getafe, but AEK lost 4–1 on aggregate, with no goals from Kallon. He also played in the Super League Greece playoffs to determine qualification to European competition. He scored once in his three appearances, and AEK finished second to qualify for the following year's UEFA Cup.

Greek fans remember him especially for an excellent goal against PAOK in a 4–0 win, when he scored with a chip shot outside the box.

=== Al-Shaab ===
In August 2008, Kallon signed with UAE Pro League club Al-Shaab for the 2008–09 season. He was released from his contract after a few months due to poor performances.

=== Kallon ===
In October 2009, he signed for his own club Kallon.

=== Later career ===
On 1 March 2010, he joined the Chinese championship, signing a one-year deal with Shaanxi Chanba. Kallon made his CSL debut against Dalian Shide on 28 March and scored a penalty kick in 50th minute. He decided to leave after his contract was finished in December to be closer to his family. In 2011, he moved to India and signed with I-League club Chirag United Kerala.

He returned to Kallon ahead of the 2012 CAF Confederation Cup, and scored the winning goal that got them to the second round.

On 26 June 2014, was named the head coach of Sierra Leone u-17 side.

On 22 March 2016, he announced his retirement as a player, having last played in 2014.

== International career ==
Kallon became the youngest player to ever play for the Leone Stars when he made his senior international debut for Sierra Leone at the age of fifteen in April 1995 against Congo in the 1996 African Cup of Nations qualifier in Freetown, in which he scored the winner. At the age of 16, Kallon was the youngest player at the 1996 African Nations cup in South Africa. He scored one of his country's two goals as Sierra Leone defeated Burkina Faso 2–1 in their opening group match at the 1996 African Nations Cup, played at the Free State Stadium in Bloemfontein, South Africa.

He was a key member of Leone Stars and active at 1998, 2002, 2006 and 2010 World Cup qualification. Kallon was the captain of the Sierra Leone national team but quit his captaincy after the team failed to qualify for the 2010 FIFA World Cup and the 2010 African Cup of Nations. His last game with Sierra Leone was on 16 June 2012, in the first round of the 2013 CAN qualification.

== Managerial career ==
On 12 February 2025, he was appointed manager of Sierra Leone national team by the Sierra Leone Football Association.

On 3 April 2026, he was dismissed by the Sierra Leone FA three days after a defeat in the penalty shoot out against Azerbaijan in the 2026 FIFA Series, having managed Sierra Leone for seven games with a record of three wins, two draws and two defeats.

== Club owner ==
Kallon is the founder and owner of the Sierra Leonean club Kallon, currently playing in the Sierra Leone National Premier League. Kallon is one of the top clubs in the Sierra Leone National Premier League and play their home games at the National Stadium in Freetown. Previously known as Sierra Fisheries, Kallon acquired the club in 2002 for $30,000.

Kallon won the Sierra Leonean FA Cup, the Sierra Leone League title in 2006 and qualified for the African Champions League.

== Personal life ==
Kallon is a devout Muslim and a member of the Mandingo ethnic group. Kallon is married to his childhood girlfriend M'mah Mansaray. The couple celebrated their wedding at the Freetown Central Mosque in Freetown on 15 June 2002. Kallon is the younger brother of former Sierra Leonean international footballers Kemokai Kallon and Musa Kallon.

== Mohamed Kallon Children's Foundation ==
Apart from the Kalleone Group of Company, comprising a musical recording studio, radio station, newspaper, sportshops, old Skool night club, pharmacy and FC Kallon, Mohamed Kallon is also about to launch his charity foundation, the MKCF, Mohamed Kallon Children's Foundation, which will cater for the needs of hundreds of Sierra Leone's street children. Recently Mohamed Kallon told SierraEye Magazine that as a boy himself who grew up in the streets of Freetown he is moved by the state of Sierra Leone Street Children and want to do all he can to help them. The foundation has made headways recently meeting with the president and working together with the United Nations and other NGOs to provide help for several Sierra Leonean children and also aiding the HIV/AIDS sensitisation programme in Sierra Leone. x The setting up of MKCF by Kallon gained massive media coverage and even the BBC reported on it.

== Career statistics ==
=== Club ===
Appearances and goals by club, season and competition
Club	Season	League			National cup		League cup		Continental		Other		Total	
Club	Season	Division	Apps	Goals	Apps	Goals	Apps	Goals	Apps	Goals	Apps	Goals	Apps	Goals
Old Edwardians	1993–94	Sierra Leone National Premier League	13	4			—		—		—		13	4
Tadamon Sour	1994–95	Lebanese Premier League	24	15					—		—		24	15
Lugano	1995–96	Nationalliga A	13	5	1	0	—		0	0	—		14	5
Lugano	1996–97	Nationalliga A	19	1	0	0	—		—		—		19	1
Lugano	Total		69	25	1	0			0	0	—		70	25
Bologna	1997–98	Serie A	2	0	4	2	—		—		—		6	2
Genoa	1997–98	Serie B	26	10	0	0	—		—		—		26	10
Cagliari	1998–99	Serie A	26	6	4	0	—		—		—		30	6
Reggina	1999–2000	Serie A	30	11	7	3	—		—		—		37	14
Vicenza	2000–01	Serie A	25	8	1	0	—		—		—		26	8
Inter Milan	2001–02	Serie A	29	9	1	0	—		11	6	—		41	15
Inter Milan	2002–03	Serie A	9	5	2	0	—		6	0	—		17	5
Inter Milan	2003–04	Serie A	5	0	0	0	—		2	0	—		7	0
Inter Milan	Total		43	14	3	0	—		19	6	—		65	20
Monaco	2004–05	Ligue 1	34	11	5	2	2	0	9	4	—		50	17
Monaco	2006–07	Ligue 1	12	2	0	0	0	0	—		—		12	2
Monaco	2007–08	Ligue 1	2	0	0	0	0	0	—		—		2	0
Monaco	Total		48	13	5	2	2	0	9	4	—		64	19
Al-Ittihad (loan)	2005–06	Saudi Premier League	18	11					6	6	5	2	29	19
AEK Athens	2007–08	Super League Greece	11	3	0	0	—		2	0	—		13	3
Al-Shaab	2008–09	UAE Pro League	4	1									4	1
Shaanxi Chanba	2010	Chinese Super League	21	7			—		—		—		21	7
Total			323	109	25	7	2	0	36	16	5	2	381	134

=== International ===
Appearances and goals by national team and year
National team	Year	Apps	Goals
Sierra Leone	1995	4	2
Sierra Leone	1996	5	1
Sierra Leone	1997	4	1
Sierra Leone	2000	3	0
Sierra Leone	2001	4	0
Sierra Leone	2003	4	1
Sierra Leone	2006	1	0
Sierra Leone	2007	3	0
Sierra Leone	2008	6	2
Sierra Leone	2011	2	0
Sierra Leone	2012	4	0
Total		40	7

International appearances and goals
#	Date	Venue	Opponent	Result	Goal	Competition
1.	22 April 1995	Brazzaville, Republic of Congo	Congo	2–0	1	1996 African Cup of Nations qualification
	3 June 1995	Freetown, Sierra Leone	Niger	5–1	1	1996 African Cup of Nations qualification
	15 January 1996	Bloemfontein, South Africa	Burkina Faso	2–1	1	1996 African Cup of Nations
	18 January 1996	Bloemfontein, South Africa	Algeria	0–2	0	1996 African Cup of Nations
	16 June 1996	Freetown, Sierra Leone	Burundi	0–1	0	1998 FIFA World Cup qualification
	9 November 1996	Rabat, Morocco	Morocco	0–4	0	1998 FIFA World Cup qualification
	11 January 1997	Freetown, Sierra Leone	Gabon	1–0	0	1998 FIFA World Cup qualification
	5 April 1997	Freetown, Sierra Leone	Ghana	1–1	0	1998 FIFA World Cup qualification
	26 April 1997	Freetown, Sierra Leone	Morocco	0–1	0	1998 FIFA World Cup qualification
	17 August 1997	Obuasi, Ghana	Ghana	2–0	1	1998 FIFA World Cup qualification
	22 April 2000	Freetown, Sierra Leone	São Tomé and Príncipe	4–0	0	2002 FIFA World Cup qualification
	17 June 2000	Lagos, Nigeria	Nigeria	0–2	0	2002 FIFA World Cup qualification
	9 July 2000	Accra, Ghana	Ghana	0–5	0	2002 FIFA World Cup qualification
	25 February 2001	Paynesville, Liberia	Liberia	0–1	0	2002 FIFA World Cup qualification
	10 March 2001	Freetown, Sierra Leone	Sudan	0–2	0	2002 FIFA World Cup qualification
	21 April 2001	Freetown, Sierra Leone	Nigeria	1–0	0	2002 FIFA World Cup qualification
	14 July 2001	Freetown, Sierra Leone	Liberia	0–1	0	2002 FIFA World Cup qualification
	8 June 2003	Casablanca, Morocco	Morocco	0–1	0	2004 African Cup of Nations qualification
	22 June 2003	Freetown, Sierra Leone	Equatorial Guinea	2–0	1	2004 African Cup of Nations qualification
	12 October 2003	Brazzaville, Republic of Congo	Congo	0–1	0	2006 FIFA World Cup qualification
	24 March 2007	Lomé, Togo	Togo	1–3	1	2008 Africa Cup of Nations qualification
	17 October 2007	Freetown, Sierra Leone	Guinea-Bissau	1–0	0	2010 FIFA World Cup qualification
	17 November 2007	Bissau, Guinea-Bissau	Guinea-Bissau	0–0	0	2010 FIFA World Cup qualification
	1 June 2008	Malabo, Equatorial Guinea	Equatorial Guinea	0–2	0	2010 FIFA World Cup qualification
	14 June 2008	Freetown, Sierra Leone	South Africa	1–0	1	2010 FIFA World Cup qualification
	21 June 2008	Atteridgeville, South Africa	South Africa	0–0	0	2010 FIFA World Cup qualification
	6 September 2008	Freetown, Sierra Leone	Equatorial Guinea	2–1	0	2010 FIFA World Cup qualification
	11 October 2008	Abuja, Nigeria	Nigeria	1–4	0	2010 FIFA World Cup qualification
	9 February 2011	Lagos, Nigeria	Nigeria	1–2	0	Friendly

Scores and results list Sierra Leone's goal tally first, score column indicates score after each Kallon goal.

List of international goals scored by Mohamed Kallon
No.	Date	Venue	Opponent	Score	Result	Competition
1	22 April 1995	Stade Alphonse Massemba-Débat, Brazzaville, Congo	Congo	1–0	2–0	1996 African Cup of Nations qualification
2	3 June 1995	National Stadium, Freetown, Sierra Leone	Niger	1–1	5–1	1996 African Cup of Nations qualification
3	15 January 1996	Free State Stadium, Bloemfontein, South Africa	Burkina Faso	2–1	2–1	1996 African Cup of Nations
4	17 August 1997	Accra Sports Stadium, Accra, Ghana	Ghana	2–0	2–0	1998 FIFA World Cup qualification
5	22 June 2003	National Stadium, Freetown, Sierra Leone	Equatorial Guinea	2–0	2–0	2004 African Cup of Nations qualification
6	30 April 2008	Samuel Kanyon Doe Sports Complex, Paynesville, Liberia	Liberia	1–2	1–3	Friendly
7	14 June 2008	National Stadium, Freetown, Sierra Leone	South Africa	1–0	1–0	2010 FIFA World Cup qualification

== Honours ==
Al-Ittihad

- AFC Champions League: 2005

Individual

- AFC Champions League Top Scorer: 2005
- Sierra Leone Order of the Rokel: 2013
