= Panguma =

Settlement in Sierra Leone

Coordinates: 8.024°N 11.758°W

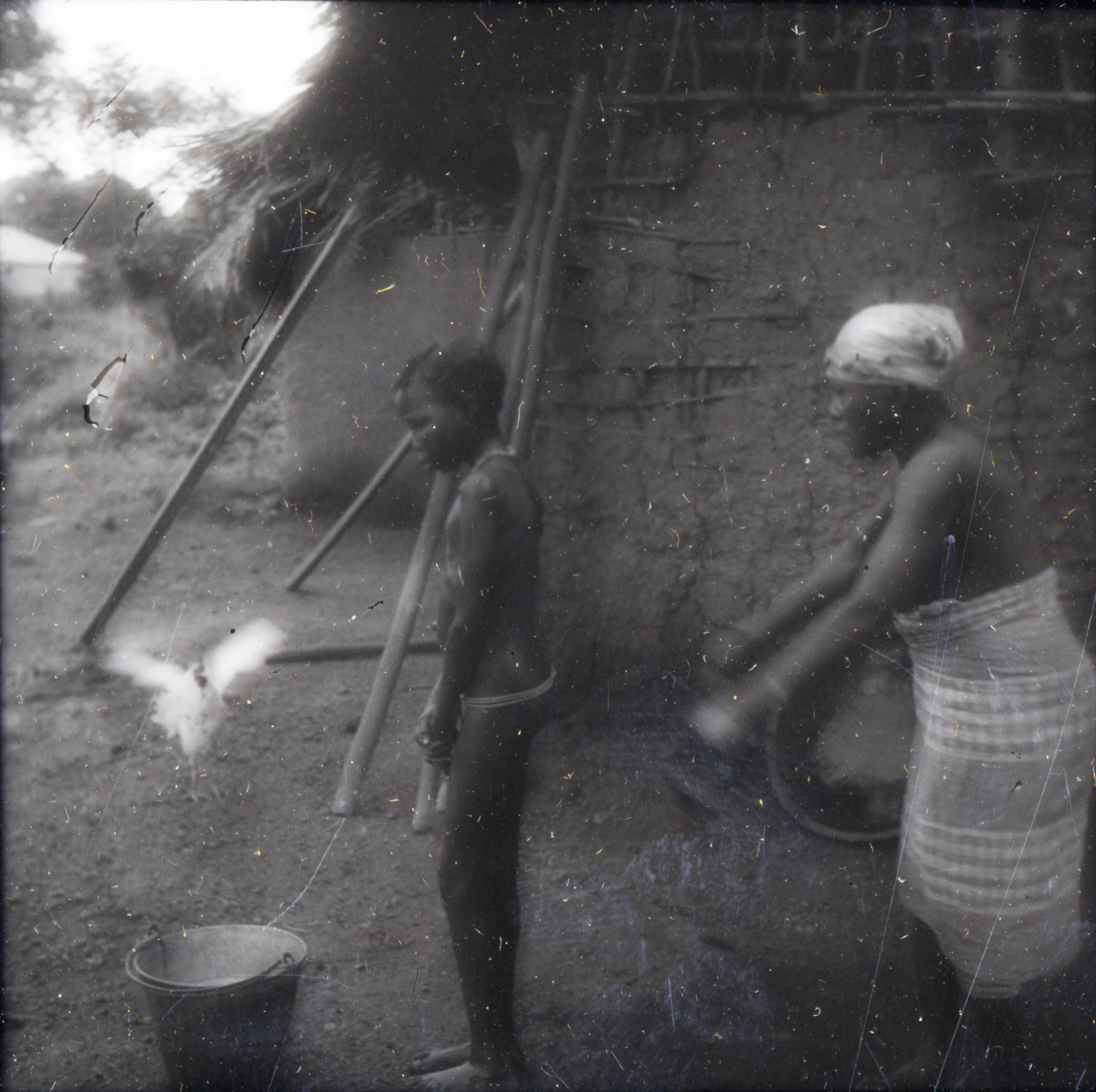
Woman washing a child in Panguma, Sierra Leone 1935.

Panguma is a village in eastern Sierra Leone, with a population of 7965. The village had previously been the capital of Mende chief Nyagua during the 19th century.

The community includes a Catholic hospital, partially supported by missionary work and charity. In 1972, a nosocomial outbreak of Lassa Fever in the Panguma Catholic Hospital attracted attention in the United States. In response, in 1976, the Centers for Disease Control and Prevention (CDC) established research programs in Segbwema, Kenema, and Panguma to study the disease. The village was attacked on March 12, 1994, as part of the Sierra Leone Civil War, killing many of the missionaries working at the hospital.

A nearby land concession positively led to diamond retrieval in 2006.

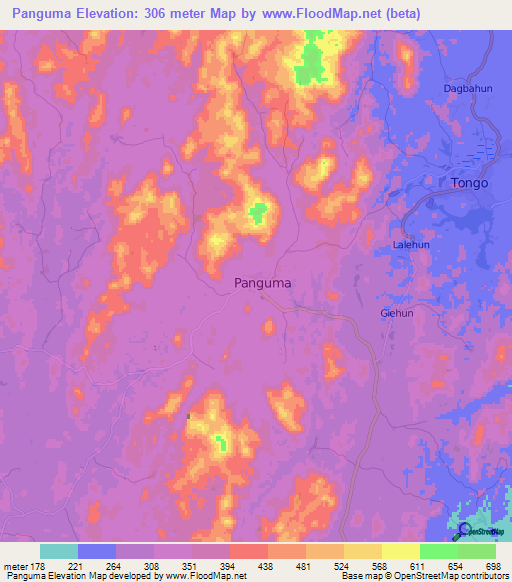
Elevation map of Panguma, Sierra Leonne

== Works cited ==
- Bausch, DG; Sesay, SS; Oshin, B (October 2004). "On the front lines of Lassa fever". Emerging Infectious Diseases. 10 (10): 1889–1890. doi:10.3201/eid1010.IM1010. PMC 3323285. PMID 15586983.
- Mellor, N. (2004a). "Aniru Conteh". BMJ. 328 (7447): 1078. doi:10.1136/bmj.328.7447.1078. PMC 403863. S2CID 220113222.
