= Kamboi Eagles F.C. =

Association football club in Sierra Leone

Kamboi Eagles FC
- Full name: Kamboi Eagles Football Club
- Nickname: The Eagles
- Founded: 1956
- Ground: Kenema City Field; Kenema, Sierra Leone
- Capacity: 3,000
- Chairman: Alhassan Kargbo
- Manager: Alimu Koroma
- League: Sierra Leone National Premier League
- 2025–26: 16th
Home colours

The Kamboi Eagles Football Club commonly known as Kamboi Eagles, is a Sierra Leonean football club based in Kenema City, Sierra Leone, currently a member of the Sierra Leone National Premier League, the highest division of football league in Sierra Leone. The Eagles have an intense rivalry with the Diamond Stars of Kono and cross-regional rival Bo Rangers.

== History ==
The Eagles play their home games at the Kenema City Field in Kenema City and have won the Sierra Leonean FA Cup three times, in 1981,1985 and 2014. Sierra Leonean international footballer Paul Kpaka started his career with Kamboi Eagles before moving to Europe.

On 19 October 2022, Ahead of Sierra Leone's Premier League Season the Management of Kamboi Eagles FC has confirmed the appointment of former player Alimu Koroma (System) as their new head coach for two seasons after replacing Francis Zappa Koroma who left the club a few months ago.

== Achievements ==
- Sierra Leonean FA Cup: 3

1981, 1985, 2014.

== Performance in CAF competitions ==
- CAF Confederation Cup: 1 appearance

2015 – Preliminary Round

- CAF Cup: 1 appearance

1993 – withdrew in First Round

- CAF Cup Winners' Cup: 2 appearances

1982 – First Round
1986 – disqualified in First Round
