= Kenema =

- City
- Location of Kenema in Sierra Leone
- Coordinates: 7°52′N 11°11′W
- Country: Sierra Leone
- Province: Eastern Province
- District: Kenema District
- Elevation: 173 m (568 ft)

Population (2021)
  - Total: 255,110
  - Rank: 2nd in Sierra Leone
- Time zone: UTC+0 (GMT)

Kenema is a city in the Eastern Province of Sierra Leone and the administrative capital of Kenema District. With a population of 255,110 recorded in the 2021 mid-term Population and Housing Census, it is the second most populous city in Sierra Leone, after the national capital Freetown. The city lies at approximately 173 metres above sea level within a valley at a natural gap in the Kambui Hills, at coordinates 7°52′N 11°11′W.

Kenema is the principal commercial and administrative hub of eastern Sierra Leone, serving as the regional centre for trade, banking, public services, and transport linking the interior to cross-border markets with Liberia. It is the seat of Kenema District Council and one of Sierra Leone's six designated municipalities, governed by an elected city council and a directly elected mayor.

Kenema's modern growth is rooted in the colonial period, when its position on the Sierra Leone Government Railway made it a collection point for timber, palm produce, cocoa, and coffee destined for export through Freetown. The discovery of alluvial diamonds in 1931 deepened the city's integration into Sierra Leone's extractive economy, and the Government Diamond Office, established in 1959, continues to coordinate the valuation and certification of diamonds from the Eastern Province. During the Sierra Leone Civil War (1991–2002), Kenema's proximity to the diamond fields of Kono District and Kailahun District made it a recurring theatre of conflict between the Revolutionary United Front (RUF), the Civil Defence Forces (CDF), and government troops.

Kenema Government Hospital occupies a distinctive position in global public health history. It operates one of the few dedicated Lassa fever treatment and research units in the world, and it was at this institution that Sierra Leone's first confirmed case of Ebola virus disease was diagnosed on 25 May 2014, at the onset of the West African Ebola epidemic.

== History ==
=== Pre-colonial and early settlement ===
Local oral tradition holds that Kenema was founded by Ngombulango, a hunter from the nearby settlement of Gombu, who identified the present site on a hunting expedition and established a permanent settlement several generations before the arrival of European colonial administration. The wider Kenema region forms part of the Upper Guinea forest zone historically inhabited by Mende-speaking communities, whose chieftaincy systems governed land tenure, agricultural production, and inter-community trade across southeastern Sierra Leone.

=== Colonial period ===
The British established the Sierra Leone Protectorate in 1896, extending formal colonial administration to the interior. Kenema expanded considerably when the Sierra Leone Government Railway reached the town in 1909, connecting it directly to Freetown and facilitating export-oriented trade in timber, palm oil, palm kernels, cocoa, and coffee. Under colonial administration, Kenema developed as a collection and distribution point for produce from the surrounding countryside; markets, administrative offices, and mission schools were established during this period.

The discovery of alluvial diamonds in the Kenema area in 1931 transformed the local economy and the city's regional significance. Kenema became the administrative centre of the Alluvial Diamond Mining Scheme and, from 1959, the site of the Government Diamond Office, which regulates the valuation and export of diamonds from southeastern Sierra Leone. The diamond industry attracted substantial in-migration and expanded the city's commercial base considerably.

=== Sierra Leone Civil War (1991–2002) ===
Kenema's proximity to the diamond-rich districts of Kono and Kailahun made it strategically significant during the Sierra Leone Civil War. The city changed hands repeatedly between the Revolutionary United Front (RUF), the Sierra Leone Armed Forces, and the Civil Defence Forces (CDF), the latter composed largely of Mende Kamajor hunters who drew on traditional initiation practices in their defence of southeastern Sierra Leone. RUF forces occupied parts of Kenema District in 1997 and again during the devastating January 1999 offensive and its aftermath.

Diamonds mined in and traded through the Kenema area became one of the principal financing mechanisms for the RUF during the conflict. This role in the international trade of conflict diamonds contributed directly to the global debate that culminated in the establishment of the Kimberley Process Certification Scheme in 2003. Population displacement was extensive, and many rural communities surrounding Kenema were abandoned during periods of active conflict.

=== Post-war reconstruction ===
Kenema participated in Sierra Leone's post-war reconstruction following the conflict's formal end in 2002. Population growth accelerated as displaced persons returned and urban migration increased; the city's population grew from an estimated 128,402 in 2004 to 200,443 by 2015, and to 255,110 by 2021.

=== Colonial and economic development ===
Kenema expanded under the Sierra Leone Protectorate (established 1896), with growth linked to the Sierra Leone Government Railway. By 1909, the railway connected Kenema to Freetown, facilitating export-oriented production.

Diamond deposits discovered in 1931 integrated Kenema into Sierra Leone's extractive economy, particularly in alluvial diamond mining zones of the Eastern Province.

=== Civil war (1991–2002) ===
During the Sierra Leone Civil War, Kenema District experienced occupation by Revolutionary United Front forces in 1997 and 1999. The conflict contributed to population displacement and disruption of economic activity across the district.

=== Ebola outbreak (2014–2016) ===
Kenema Government Hospital confirmed Sierra Leone's first Ebola case on 25 May 2014. By the end of the epidemic, Sierra Leone had recorded over 14,000 cases and nearly 4,000 deaths, with Kenema among the early epicentres.

== Geography ==
Kenema lies at approximately 7°52′N 11°11′W in a broad valley at a natural gap in the Kambui Hills, within the Upper Guinea forest ecosystem of southeastern Sierra Leone. The city sits at approximately 173 metres above sea level. The Kambui Hills Forest Reserve lies immediately to the west, reaching elevations of up to 645 metres; it serves both as a biodiversity area of international significance and as the primary catchment for reservoirs supplying the city with water.

Kenema is connected by road to Bo to the west, to Kailahun and Kono districts to the north and east, and to Pujehun District and the Liberian border via the southern corridor through Zimmi. The former Sierra Leone Government Railway, which linked Kenema to Freetown until its closure in 1974, helped establish the city's initial settlement and commercial geography, and the course of the former railway line still shapes the city's main commercial corridor.

=== Climate ===
Kenema has a tropical monsoon climate (Köppen Am), characterised by a pronounced wet season from May to October and a drier season from November to April. The Harmattan, a dry northeasterly wind from the Sahara, moderates conditions briefly between December and February, though its effect in southeastern Sierra Leone is considerably milder than in the country's north or in the broader Sahel zone. Annual rainfall averages approximately 2,600 to 2,700 mm, consistent with the dense forest belt of southeastern Sierra Leone. Mean annual temperature is approximately 26 °C, with limited seasonal variation.

== Demographics ==
=== Population ===
Kenema has undergone rapid urbanisation, with its population increasing nearly eightfold between 1974 and 2021. Urban growth has been driven by in-migration linked to mining, trade, post-war resettlement, and expansion of public services.

Historical population of Kenema
Year	Population	Change
1974	31,458	—
1985	52,473	+66.8%
2004	128,402	+144.7%
2015	200,443	+56.1%
2021	255,110	+27.3%
Source: Statistics Sierra Leone

The surrounding Kenema District recorded a population of 772,472 in the 2021 census, making it the most populous district in the Eastern Province.

=== Ethnicity ===
Kenema is among the most ethnically diverse cities in Sierra Leone. The Mende form the largest ethnic group and represent the dominant population across Kenema District. Significant communities of Kono, Kissi, Limba, Temne, and Fula are also present, reflecting patterns of internal migration linked to trade and mining. A Lebanese-Sierra Leonean community, with historical roots in colonial-era commerce, remains active in the retail and wholesale trading sectors.

== Economy ==
Kenema is the commercial hub of southeastern Sierra Leone, with economic activity organised around mining, agriculture, agro-processing, trade, banking, and public administration.

=== Mining ===
Kenema remains the administrative centre of Sierra Leone's alluvial diamond industry. The Government Diamond Office, established in 1959, coordinates the valuation, licensing, and certification of diamonds exported from the Eastern Province. Artisanal and small-scale mining for diamonds and gold persists across Kenema District, providing livelihoods for a significant share of the rural workforce, although researchers have documented persistent trade-offs with agricultural land use, including farmland loss and environmental degradation from mining pits and spoil.

=== Agriculture ===
The Eastern Province, and Kenema District in particular, forms the heartland of Sierra Leone's cocoa and coffee production. Cooperatives in Kenema, Kailahun, and Kono districts aggregate beans for export. The surrounding countryside also produces palm oil and palm kernels, rice, cassava, and timber-based products including furniture and wood carvings, most of which are transported by road to Freetown for domestic sale or export.

=== Agro-processing and manufacturing ===
Kenema supports a growing agro-processing sector. The city supplies fresh fruit to Sierra Juice, a juice-manufacturing operation run by Capitol Foods that processes locally sourced pineapples, mangoes, and other tropical fruits into bottled beverages distributed across Sierra Leone. Sierra Juice is reported to source produce from more than 5,000 farmers in the Eastern Province, providing an important non-mining income stream for rural households. Smaller-scale processing of palm oil, rice, gari, and sawn timber also takes place in and around the city.

=== Trade and retail ===
Kenema hosts one of the largest open-air markets in southeastern Sierra Leone and serves as a regional distribution centre for goods moving between Freetown, the Kono diamond districts, and neighbouring Liberia via the Zimmi corridor. Informal cross-border trade with Liberia constitutes a significant component of the local economy. The formal retail sector includes branches of national supermarket chains alongside locally owned shops, pharmacies, hardware merchants, and Lebanese-owned trading houses.

In October 2025, the Ministry of Finance and the World Bank signed contracts under the Resilient Urban Sierra Leone Project (RUSLP) for a major upgrade of Kenema Central Market, incorporating expanded market facilities, improved drainage and sanitation infrastructure, and safer trading structures for vendors.

=== Banking and financial services ===
Kenema is an important financial centre in the Eastern Province. It hosts the only provincial branch of the Bank of Sierra Leone, alongside branches of the Sierra Leone Commercial Bank, GTBank Sierra Leone, and other commercial financial institutions.

== Infrastructure and urban services ==
Access to electricity in Sierra Leone remains limited, with national electrification rates below 30%, and significantly lower in rural areas.

Urban transport in Kenema is dominated by motorcycles (okada) and tricycles (kekeh), reflecting broader transport patterns across Sierra Leone.

== Health ==
=== Kenema Government Hospital ===
Kenema Government Hospital (KGH) is the principal referral hospital for the Eastern Province and a facility of international significance in infectious disease research and response. The hospital provides secondary and tertiary care to a catchment population spanning Kenema, Kailahun, and Kono districts.

=== Lassa fever ===
Kenema District is among the highest-burden endemic zones for Lassa fever in West Africa. The rodent-borne haemorrhagic illness caused by the Lassa virus is estimated to cause between 100,000 and 300,000 infections annually across the West African region. Kenema Government Hospital has operated a dedicated Lassa fever treatment and research programme since the 1970s, run in partnership between Sierra Leone's Ministry of Health and Sanitation and the international Viral Hemorrhagic Fever Consortium (VHFC). The programme conducts nationwide surveillance, contact tracing, rodent control, and community education, and has contributed to the development of rapid diagnostic tests for the virus. KGH operates one of the few dedicated Lassa fever isolation and treatment wards in the world.

=== 2014–2015 Ebola epidemic ===
Kenema was the epicentre of Sierra Leone's involvement in the 2013–2016 West African Ebola epidemic, the deadliest Ebola outbreak in recorded history. On 25 May 2014, Augustine Goba, head of the Lassa fever laboratory at KGH, produced the first confirmed diagnosis of Ebola virus disease in Sierra Leone. The hospital's existing Lassa fever infrastructure was rapidly converted into the country's first Ebola isolation and diagnostic facility.

Between May 2014 and January 2015, approximately 600 Ebola cases originated in Kenema District, of which 92 (15 percent) were health-care workers, including 66 staff members of KGH itself. Among those who died was Dr. Sheik Humarr Khan, chief physician of the Lassa Fever Programme, who died on 29 July 2014. President Ernest Bai Koroma posthumously named Khan a national hero; Nature named him one of its "Ten People Who Mattered" of 2014. Head nurse Mbalu Fonnie also died during the outbreak. In August 2014, KGH was temporarily closed. In late November 2014, burial workers in Kenema publicly deposited bodies outside government offices in protest at non-payment of hazard allowances, an incident reported widely in international media.

In 2019, the asteroid 6781 Sheikhumarrkhan was named in Dr. Khan's honour by the Minor Planet Center.

=== Médecins Sans Frontières paediatric hospital ===
In March 2019, Médecins Sans Frontières (MSF) opened a dedicated paediatric hospital at Hangha, on the outskirts of Kenema, to address the high child and maternal mortality rates recorded in the Eastern Province. The facility operates as a 91-bed children's hospital offering an emergency room, an intensive care unit, two general paediatric wards, a laboratory, and a blood bank. It provides free inpatient and outpatient care to children under five.

=== COVID-19 pandemic ===
Kenema Government Hospital served as one of Sierra Leone's primary molecular-diagnostic centres during the COVID-19 pandemic. In 2020, the World Health Organization secured a €500,000 grant from the German Corporation for International Cooperation (GIZ) to expand SARS-CoV-2 testing capacity at the hospital. Reporting in Nature noted that the hospital's response was constrained by shortages of personal protective equipment and by strike action arising from unpaid staff salaries.

=== Recent developments ===
In April 2026, the Government of Sierra Leone donated a consignment of medical and logistical equipment to Kenema Government Hospital, including a 64-slice CT scanner, an ultrasound machine, a staff bus, and a utility vehicle. The CT scanner was the first to be installed at a public hospital outside Freetown and was described by the government as a measure to reduce the need for patients in the Eastern Province to seek advanced diagnostic imaging abroad.

== Education ==
Sierra Leone's literacy rate is estimated at 43% for adults, with lower rates in rural areas.

Kenema hosts several secondary schools and tertiary institutions, including Eastern Technical University.

== Culture ==
The Mende cultural heritage is central to Kenema's civic identity. Traditional Mende crafts, including wood carving and furniture making, have their roots in the surrounding forest economy and remain important cultural and economic activities. The city's markets function not only as commercial spaces but as social institutions, gathering points for communities across southeastern Sierra Leone and arenas for the exchange of goods, news, and cultural expression.

Islam shapes daily life substantially in Kenema, with Friday congregational worship marking the city's weekly rhythm. Christian communities maintain an active presence through churches, schools, and the institutions of the Diocese of Kenema. Traditional religious practices coexist alongside both faiths across much of rural Kenema District.

== Sport ==
Association football is the dominant sport in Kenema, as throughout Sierra Leone. The city's principal professional club, Kamboi Eagles F.C., competes in the Sierra Leone National Premier League. Kenema has produced several of Sierra Leone's most notable international footballers, including Mohamed Kallon and Kei Kamara, both prominent in international club and national team football. Kenema Town Field serves as the city's main football venue and home ground for the Kamboi Eagles.

== History ==
=== Pre-colonial origins ===
Local oral tradition holds that Kenema was founded by Ngombulango, a hunter from the nearby settlement of Gombu, who identified the present site of Kenema on a hunting expedition and established a permanent settlement several generations before the arrival of European colonial administration.

=== Colonial period and the railway ===
Kenema's modern growth was promoted during the colonial period by its position on the government railway and by its role in the export economy of southeastern Sierra Leone. The town developed as a collection and distribution point for timber, palm produce, cocoa and coffee.

=== Mining boom ===
The discovery of alluvial diamonds in the Kenema area in 1931 transformed the local economy. The town became the administrative centre of the Alluvial Diamond Mining Scheme and, from 1959, the site of the Government Diamond Office, which regulates the valuation and export of diamonds from south-eastern Sierra Leone.

=== Sierra Leone Civil War (1991–2002) ===
During the Sierra Leone Civil War, Kenema's location near the diamond fields of Kono District and Kailahun District made it strategically significant. The city changed hands several times between the Revolutionary United Front (RUF), government forces and the Civil Defence Forces (CDF), composed largely of Mende Kamajor hunters. Diamonds mined in and traded through the Kenema area became one of the principal financing mechanisms for the RUF during the conflict, contributing to the international "blood diamond" debate that led to the creation of the Kimberley Process Certification Scheme.

== Geography and climate ==
Kenema lies at approximately 7°52′N 11°11′W, in a valley at a gap in the Kambui Hills. The city has a tropical monsoon climate (Köppen Am), with a pronounced wet season from May to October and a drier season, influenced in part by the Harmattan, from December to February. Annual rainfall is substantial, consistent with the south-eastern forest belt of Sierra Leone, while mean monthly temperatures remain warm throughout the year.

The surrounding Kambui Hills Forest Reserve is a protected Upper Guinean forest landscape of international biodiversity significance. It lies immediately west of the city, reaches elevations of up to 645 m, and acts as a catchment area for reservoirs supplying Kenema and surrounding communities.

== Demographics ==
Kenema is one of the most ethnically diverse cities in Sierra Leone. The Mende people form the largest ethnic group, alongside significant Kono, Kissi, Limba, Temne, Fula and Lebanese communities.

Historical population
Year	Population	±%
1974	31,458	—
1985	52,473	+66.8%
2004	128,402	+144.7%
2015	200,443	+56.1%
2021	255,110	+27.3%
Source: Statistics Sierra Leone.

The surrounding Kenema District recorded a population of 772,472 in the 2021 census, making it the most populous district in the Eastern Province.

=== Religion ===
Islam and Christianity are the two principal religions practised in Kenema. The Mende, as the majority ethnic group, are predominantly Sunni Muslim, while Kono and Kissi communities include both Muslim and Christian populations. Christian denominations present in Kenema include Roman Catholic, Anglican, and various Protestant churches.

Kenema is the seat of the Roman Catholic Diocese of Kenema, erected on 11 November 1970, which covers the civil districts of Kenema, Kailahun, and Kono and forms part of the ecclesiastical province of Freetown. Traditional religious practices coexist with both Islam and Christianity across much of rural Kenema District.

== Economy ==
Kenema is the commercial hub of southeastern Sierra Leone, with economic activity organised around mining, agriculture, agro-processing, trade, banking, and public administration.

=== Mining ===
Kenema remains the administrative centre of Sierra Leone's alluvial diamond industry. The Government Diamond Office, established in 1959, coordinates the valuation, licensing, and certification of diamonds exported from the Eastern Province. Artisanal and small-scale mining for diamonds and gold persists across Kenema District, providing livelihoods for a significant share of the rural workforce, although researchers have documented persistent trade-offs with agricultural land use, including farmland loss and environmental degradation from mining pits and spoil.

=== Agriculture ===
The Eastern Province, and Kenema District in particular, forms the heartland of Sierra Leone's cocoa and coffee production. Cooperatives in Kenema, Kailahun, and Kono districts aggregate beans for export. The surrounding countryside also produces palm oil and palm kernels, rice, cassava, and timber-based products including furniture and wood carvings, most of which are transported by road to Freetown for domestic sale or export.

=== Agro-processing and manufacturing ===
Kenema supports a growing agro-processing sector. The city supplies fresh fruit to Sierra Juice, a juice-manufacturing operation run by Capitol Foods that processes locally sourced pineapples, mangoes, and other tropical fruits into bottled beverages distributed across Sierra Leone. Sierra Juice is reported to source produce from more than 5,000 farmers in the Eastern Province, providing an important non-mining income stream for rural households. Smaller-scale processing of palm oil, rice, gari, and sawn timber also takes place in and around the city.

=== Trade and retail ===
Kenema hosts one of the largest open-air markets in southeastern Sierra Leone and serves as a regional distribution centre for goods moving between Freetown, the Kono diamond districts, and neighbouring Liberia via the Zimmi corridor. Informal cross-border trade with Liberia constitutes a significant component of the local economy. The formal retail sector includes branches of national supermarket chains alongside locally owned shops, pharmacies, hardware merchants, and Lebanese-owned trading houses.

In October 2025, the Ministry of Finance and the World Bank signed contracts under the Resilient Urban Sierra Leone Project (RUSLP) for a major upgrade of Kenema Central Market, incorporating expanded market facilities, improved drainage and sanitation infrastructure, and safer trading structures for vendors.

=== Banking and financial services ===
Kenema is an important financial centre in the Eastern Province. It hosts the only provincial branch of the Bank of Sierra Leone, alongside branches of the Sierra Leone Commercial Bank, GTBank Sierra Leone, and other commercial financial institutions.

== Public health ==
=== Lassa fever ===
Kenema lies within the West African Lassa fever endemic zone. Kenema Government Hospital (KGH) has operated a dedicated Lassa fever research and treatment programme since the 1970s, run in partnership between Sierra Leone's Ministry of Health and Sanitation and the international Viral Hemorrhagic Fever Consortium (VHFC). The programme conducts nationwide surveillance, contact tracing, rodent control and community education, and has developed rapid diagnostic tests for the virus.

=== 2014–2016 Ebola outbreak ===
Kenema was the epicentre of Sierra Leone's role in the 2013–2016 West African Ebola outbreak. On 25 May 2014, Augustine Goba, head of the Lassa fever laboratory at KGH, produced the first confirmed diagnosis of Ebola virus disease (EVD) in Sierra Leone. The hospital's existing Lassa fever infrastructure was rapidly converted into the country's first Ebola isolation and diagnostic facility.

Between May 2014 and January 2015, approximately 600 EVD cases originated in Kenema District, of which 92 (15%) were health-care workers, including 66 staff members of KGH itself. Among the dead were Dr. Sheik Humarr Khan, the chief physician of the Lassa Fever Programme, who died on 29 July 2014 and was posthumously named a "national hero" by President Ernest Bai Koroma and one of Nature's "Ten People Who Mattered" of 2014, and head nurse Mbalu Fonnie. In August 2014 KGH was temporarily closed; later that year, burial workers in Kenema publicly dumped bodies outside government offices in protest at non-payment of hazard allowances, an incident widely reported in international media.

In 2019, the asteroid 6781 Sheikhumarrkhan was named in Dr. Khan's honour by the Minor Planet Center.

=== COVID-19 ===
KGH served as one of Sierra Leone's primary molecular-diagnostic centres during the COVID-19 pandemic. In 2020 the World Health Organization (WHO) secured a €500,000 grant from the German Corporation for International Cooperation (GIZ) to expand SARS-CoV-2 testing capacity at the hospital. Reporting in Nature noted that the hospital's response was constrained by shortages of personal protective equipment and by strike action arising from unpaid salaries.

=== MSF Hangha Paediatric Hospital ===
In March 2019 the international medical-humanitarian organisation Médecins Sans Frontières (MSF) opened a dedicated paediatric hospital at Hangha, a town located on the outskirts of Kenema. Built specifically to address the very high child and maternal mortality rates recorded in the Eastern Province, the facility operates as a 91-bed children's hospital offering an emergency room, an intensive care unit, two general paediatric wards, a laboratory and a blood bank. It provides free inpatient and outpatient care to children under five.

=== Upgrade of Kenema Government Hospital (2026) ===
In April 2026 the Government of Sierra Leone, through the Ministry of Health and Sanitation led by Minister Dr. Austin Demby, handed over a consignment of medical and logistical equipment to Kenema Government Hospital. The donation included a 64-slice CT scanner, a new ultrasound machine, a 38-seater staff bus and a Land Cruiser utility vehicle. The CT scanner was the first to be installed at a public hospital outside Freetown and was presented by the government as a measure to reduce the need for patients in the Eastern Province to travel abroad—notably to Ghana—for advanced diagnostic imaging.

== Infrastructure ==
=== Transport ===
Road transport is Kenema's primary link to the rest of Sierra Leone and to neighbouring Liberia. The city lies on the main highway connecting Freetown, Bo, Kenema, and the eastern districts of Kailahun and Kono. The 87-kilometre Kenema–Zimmi road, linking the city to Pujehun District and the Liberian border, was handed over for rehabilitation in the early 2020s under a Sierra Leone Roads Authority contract.

The Sierra Leone Government Railway formerly connected Kenema to Freetown through Bo, serving as the backbone of the colonial-era export economy. The railway was closed in 1974 and subsequently dismantled; no rail service currently operates in Sierra Leone. Local urban transport is dominated by shared taxis, motorcycle taxis (okada), and three-wheeled auto-rickshaws known locally as kekeh.

=== Electricity ===
Kenema's electricity supply is provided through the Côte d'Ivoire–Liberia–Sierra Leone–Guinea (CLSG) Interconnection, a regional high-voltage transmission network developed under the West African Power Pool (WAPP). The network is owned and operated by TRANSCO CLSG, a special-purpose transmission company jointly established by the four participating states. The Sierra Leonean section of the CLSG project comprises approximately 530 kilometres of 225 kV transmission line passing through seven districts, including Kenema District. The Kenema substation serves as the principal injection point for grid electricity in southeastern Sierra Leone.

Local electricity distribution is managed by the Electricity Distribution and Supply Authority (EDSA). In the mid-2020s, EDSA commissioned a new 33 kV transmission line between Kenema and Bo, replacing an ageing 1985-era circuit that had been a persistent source of supply disruptions. The African Development Bank-supported Bo and Kenema Distribution System Rehabilitation and Expansion Project has further upgraded local distribution networks to improve reliability and household access.

=== Water supply ===
Kenema's water supply draws on reservoirs in the Kambui Hills catchment and on district-wide infrastructure implemented by the Sierra Leone Water Company (SALWACO). In 2026, SALWACO handed over construction works for gravity-flow water systems in Kenema District intended to extend reliable access to safe water across ten chiefdoms. The city has also been included in externally supported programmes for municipal waste management and environmental sanitation implemented in the post-Ebola period.

== Tourism ==
Kenema functions primarily as a service and transport base for visitors to the Kambui Hills Forest Reserve and the eastern approaches to Gola Rainforest National Park. Tourism remains secondary to trade, public administration and health-sector activity, but the city serves domestic travellers, NGO staff and researchers working in Sierra Leone's south-eastern forest zone.

== Education ==
Kenema follows Sierra Leone's national 6-3-3-4 education structure: six years of primary schooling, three years of junior secondary, three years of senior secondary, and four years of tertiary education. Primary education is free and compulsory in government-sponsored public schools under national policy.

Notable secondary schools in Kenema include Kenema Government Secondary School (GSSK), Holy Trinity Secondary School, Ahmadiyya Secondary School, Holy Rosary Secondary School, the Islamic Secondary School, and the Kamboi Lebanese International School.

Eastern Technical University (ETU), located on Combema Road, is the city's principal tertiary institution, offering certificate, diploma, and degree programmes across technical and professional disciplines.

== Governance ==
Kenema is one of Sierra Leone's six designated municipalities and is administered by an elected Kenema City Council. Executive authority is vested in a directly elected mayor; municipal elections are held every four years in line with the national electoral calendar. Kenema has historically been an electoral stronghold of the Sierra Leone People's Party (SLPP), which draws its core support from the Mende-majority Eastern and Southern provinces.

== Sport ==
As in the rest of the country, association football is the most popular sport in Kenema. The city's principal club, the Kamboi Eagles, plays in the Sierra Leone National Premier League.

== Media ==
Local radio is the primary mass medium in Kenema, serving communities across the city and the broader district. National radio and television broadcasting services, including the Sierra Leone Broadcasting Corporation (SLBC), are received throughout the region. Digital and online media platforms have expanded in reach as mobile internet access has grown across Sierra Leone.

== Notable people ==
- Mohamed Kallon, footballer
- Kei Kamara, footballer
- Sheik Umar Khan, virologist and Lassa fever specialist; national hero
- Salia Jusu-Sheriff, former Vice-President of Sierra Leone
- J. B. Dauda, politician
- David J. Francis, former Chief Minister of Sierra Leone
- Emmerson Bockarie, musician
- Paul Kpaka, footballer
- Alpha Lansana, footballer
- Brima Sesay, footballer
- Kemokai Kallon, footballer
- Musa Kallon, football manager
- Amadou Bakayoko, footballer
