= Sierra Leone (1961–1971) =

African country from 1961 to 1971

- 1961–1971
- Flag Coat of arms
- Motto: Unity, Freedom, Justice
- Anthem: High We Exalt Thee, Realm of the Free
- Capital: Freetown
- Government: Unitary parliamentary constitutional monarchy
- Queen
  - 1961–1971: Elizabeth II
- Governor-General
  - 1961–1971: See list
- Prime Minister
  - 1961–1971: See list
- Historical era: Decolonisation of Africa
  - Independence: 27 April 1961
  - Republic: 19 April 1971

Population
  - 1963: 2,180,355
  - 1965: 2,473,294
  - 1970: 2,692,259
- Currency: British West African pound (1961–1964); Sierra Leonean Leone (1964–1971)
Preceded by	Succeeded by
Sierra Leone Colony and Protectorate	Republic of Sierra Leone
- Today part of: Sierra Leone

The Dominion of Sierra Leone was an independent sovereign state with Queen Elizabeth II as its head of state between independence on 27 April 1961 and becoming the Republic of Sierra Leone on 19 April 1971.

When British rule ended in April 1961, the British Crown Colony of Sierra Leone was given independence under the Sierra Leone Independence Act 1961. Elizabeth II, remained the head of state of Sierra Leone and was represented in Sierra Leone by a Governor-General. Sierra Leone shared the Sovereign with other countries, including the United Kingdom.

== History ==
On 27 April 1961, Sierra Leone gained independence. It retained a parliamentary system of government and was a member of the British Commonwealth of Nations.

=== An independent nation led by Sir Milton Margai ===
On 27 April 1961, Milton Margai led Sierra Leone to independence from the United Kingdom. Thousands of Sierra Leoneans across the nation took to the streets to celebrate their independence. The nation held its first general elections on 27 May 1962, and Sir Milton Margai was elected Sierra Leone's first prime minister by a landslide. Milton Margai's political party, the Sierra Leone People's Party (SLPP), won by large margins in the nation's first general election under universal adult suffrage in May 1962 under universal adult franchise. The All People's Congress (APC) emerged as the most organised opposition.

An important aspect of Margai's character was his self-effacement. He was neither corrupt nor did he make a lavish display of his power or status. Sir Milton's government was based on the rule of law and the notion of separation of powers, with multiparty political institutions and fairly viable representative structures. Margai used his conservative ideology to lead Sierra Leone without much strife. He appointed government officials with a clear eye to satisfy various ethnic groups. Margai successfully built coalitions from in the 1950s to attain independence without bloodshed. With his genteel nature, Margai employed a brokerage style of politics by sharing political power between political groups and the paramount chiefs in the provinces.

In March 1964, Njala University opened.

Upon Margai's death on 28 April 1964, an internal crisis within members of the Sierra Leone People's party erupted as to who would succeed Margai as prime minister. The parliament of Sierra Leone held an emergency session to elect a new prime minister; the person must be a member of the ruling SLPP party. One of the two leading candidates to succeed Margai as prime minister was Sir Albert Margai, Sierra Leone's Finance Minister and also the younger brother of Sir Milton Margai. The other was Dr. John Karefa-Smart, Sierra Leone's foreign minister and a close ally of Sir Milton. Sir Albert Margai was elected by a majority vote in Parliament to be the new leader of the SLPP and the next prime minister of Sierra Leone. Sir Albert attempted to establish a one-party state with the ready cooperation of the opposition All People' Congress, but met fierce resistance from some members of his own party, the Sierra Leone People's Party (SLPP), and ultimately abandoned the idea. Sir Albert Margai's leadership was briefly challenged by Sierra Leone's Foreign Minister John Karefa-Smart, an ethnic Sherbro, who questioned Sir Albert's succession to the SLPP leadership position. Kareefa-Smart received little support in Parliament in his attempt to have Margai stripped of the SLPP leadership.

On 4 August 1964, Sierra Leone's decimal currency, the Sierra Leonean leone, was introduced to replace the British West African pound.

=== Albert Margai Administration ===
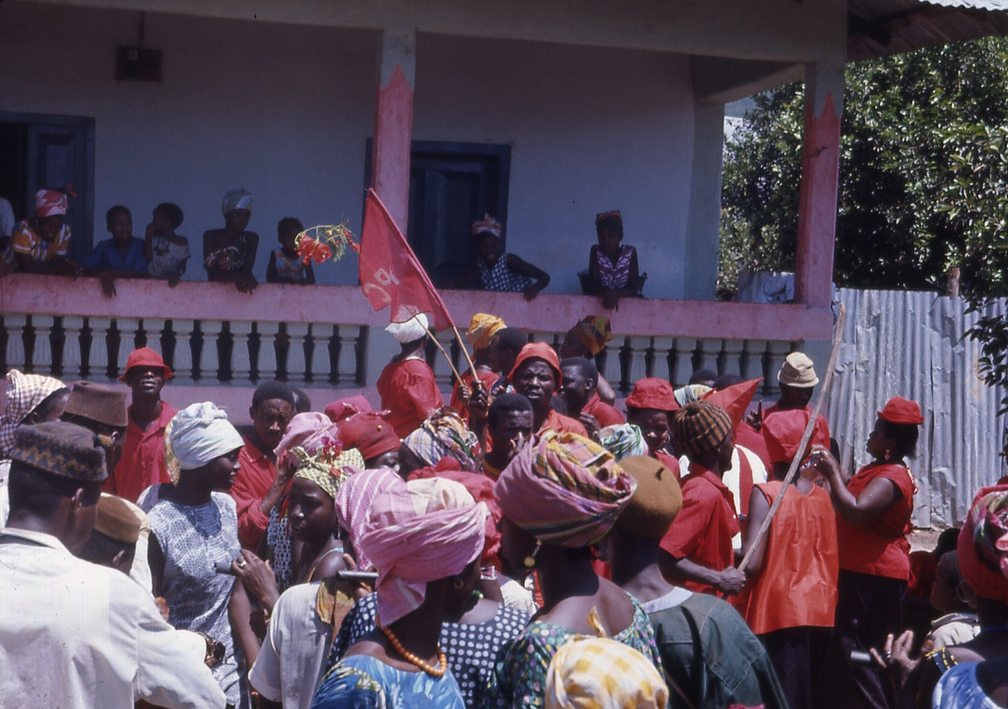
APC political rally in Kabala, Koinadugu District outside the home of supporters of the rival SLPP in 1967

Sir Albert was sworn in as Sierra Leone's second prime minister the same day his brother died at a ceremony held at the Sierra Leone's parliament in Freetown. Soon after Margai was sworn in as prime minister, he immediately dismissed Karefa-Smart and several other senior government officials who had served under his elder brother Sir Milton's government, as he viewed them as traitors and a threat to his administration. Sir Albert appointed the Creole politician Cyril B. Rogers-Wright to replace Karefa-Smart.

Unlike his late brother Milton, Sir Albert was opposed to the colonial legacy of allowing the country's Paramount Chiefs executive powers and he was seen as a threat to the existence of the ruling houses across the country. This made him unpopular with the powerful paramount chiefs, most of whom were founding members of the SLPP. To strengthen support for his reform agenda for the party and the country the new prime minister brought into the executive of the SLPP and his government younger, western-educated, and more radicalised members of the party including Salia Jusu Sheriff (PhD). The party was thus divided with the traditionalist and more powerful old guard against the new and younger leaders. As Prime Minister Sir Albert Margai opposed Creole domination of the civil service and many ethnic Creoles lost their positions in the civil service as a result. Sir Albert Margai was highly criticized during his tenure as prime minister. He was accused of corruption and of a policy of affirmative action in favor of the Mende ethnic group. During Albert Margai's administration, The Mende increased their influence both in the civil service and the army. Most of the top military and government positions were held by Mendes. Sir Albert also tried to establish a one-party state but with very little support in Parliament, even among his fellow SLPP members and was also met by fierce resistance from the main opposition the All People's Congress (APC), which had become suddenly more popular than the ruling SLPP and ultimately abandoned the idea.

Under Albert Margai's government, Sierra Leone enjoyed freedom of speech and freedom of the press. Sir Albert tolerated criticism of his government, even by his political opponent. Not a single journalist or politician was killed during his term in office. Sir Albert tolerated criticism or written libel claims against his government. Under Albert Margai, all Sierra Leoneans had equal access to free and fair trial. Sir Albert had the opportunity to perpetuate himself in power, but he elected not to do so even when the opportunities presented themselves. He had the police and the army on his side and nothing could have prevented him from achieving his ambition to hold on to power, but he chose not to and called for free and fair elections.

=== Three military coups, 1967-1968 ===
After the closely contested general election in March 1967, Sierra Leone Governor General Sir Henry Josiah Lightfoot Boston declared the new prime minister to be Siaka Stevens, an ethnic Limba, the candidate of the APC and the mayor of Freetown. Stevens had defeated the incumbent prime minister, Sir Albert Margai, by a narrow margin. Stevens won the majority of the vote in the north of the country and in the western area, including in Freetown. Albert Margai on the other side, won the vast majority of the vote in south-eastern Sierra Leone. Sir Albert conceded defeat and handed power to Siaka Stevens. Stevens was sworn in as Sierra Leone's third prime minister on 21 March 1967 in Freetown. Mere hours after he took office, soldiers stormed the State House and abducted Stevens at gunpoint. The coup was led by Brigadier General David Lansana, an ethnic Mende and the commander of the Sierra Leone Armed Forces. Brigadier Lansana was a prominent supporter of Albert Margai, who had appointed him to the top command in 1964. Brigadier Lansana declared a state of emergency and imposed martial law. He insisted that the determination of the winner of the election should await the election of the tribal representatives in Parliament, mostly from Mende chiefdoms in South-Eastern Sierra Leone.

On 23 March 1967, however, a group of senior army officers led by Brigadier Andrew Juxon-Smith, an ethnic Creole, in turn seized control of the government, arrested Lansana and suspended the constitution. Martial law was maintained. The group constituted itself as the National Reformation Council (NRC) with Brigadier Andrew Juxon-Smith as its chairman.

The NRC in turn was overthrown in April 1968 by a "sergeants' revolt," the Anti-Corruption Revolutionary Movement. NRC members were imprisoned, army and police officers were deposed, the democratic constitution was restored, and power was handed back to Stevens, who at last assumed the office of prime minister. John Bangura, a formerly dismissed senior officer, was invited to head the army. Tranquility was not completely restored: in November 1968 a state of emergency was declared after provincial disturbances.

In 1969, the University of Sierra Leone was set up, comprising Fourah Bay College and Njala University.

In March 1971 the government survived an unsuccessful military coup.

On 19 April 1971, Sierra Leone became a republic with Siaka Stevens as the first executive President of the Republic.

== Governors-General ==
The Governors-General of Sierra Leone were:

1. Sir Maurice Henry Dorman (27 April 1961 – 27 April 1962)
2. Sir Henry Josiah Lightfoot Boston (27 April 1962 – April 1967)
3. Andrew Juxon-Smith (April 1967 – 18 April 1968) (acting)
4. John Amadu Bangura (18–22 April 1968) (acting)
5. Sir Banja Tejan-Sie (22 April 1968 – 31 March 1971)
6. Christopher Okoro Cole (Chief Justice of Sierra Leone) (31 March – 19 April 1971) (interim)

== Prime Ministers ==
The Prime Ministers (and heads of government) of Sierra Leone during this period were:

1. Sir Milton Margai (27 April 1961 – 30 April 1964) (died in office)
2. Sir Albert Margai (30 April 1964 – 17 March 1967)
3. Siaka Stevens (first term) (17 March 1967 – 21 March 1967)
4. David Lansana (21 March 1967 – 24 March 1967)
5. Ambrose Patrick Genda (24 March 1967 – 27 March 1967)^{a}
6. Andrew Juxon Smith (27 March 1967 – 19 April 1968)^{a}
7. Patrick Conteh (19 April 1968 – 26 April 1968)^{b}
8. Siaka Stevens (second term) (26 April 1968 – 19 April 1971)

a. As Chairman of the National Reform Council.
b. As Chairman of the National Interim Council.

== Transition to a republic ==
Standard of the Governor-General of Sierra Leone, 1961–1971

Queen Elizabeth II visited Sierra Leone from 25 November to 1 December 1961, shortly after independence.

Sierra Leone became a republic within the Commonwealth on the promulgation of the 1971 Constitution of Sierra Leone and Prime Minister Siaka Stevens became the first President of Sierra Leone.

== See also ==
- Elizabeth II, Queen of Sierra Leone
- Medals of Sierra Leone (1961–1971)
