= List of heads of state of Sierra Leone =

This is a list of the heads of state of Sierra Leone, from the independence of the Sierra Leone in 1961 to the present day.

From 1961 to 1971 the head of state under the Constitution of 1961 was the queen of Sierra Leone Elizabeth II, who was also the monarch of other Commonwealth realms. The monarch was represented in Sierra Leone by a governor-general. Sierra Leone became a republic within the Commonwealth under the Constitution of 1971 and the monarch and governor-general were replaced by a ceremonial president, a year later it became an executive presidency.

== Monarch (1961–1971) ==
The succession to the throne was the same as the succession to the British throne.

No.	Portrait	Name (Birth–Death)	Reign			Royal House	Prime minister(s)
No.	Portrait	Name (Birth–Death)	Reign start	Reign end	Duration	Royal House	Prime minister(s)
1		Queen Elizabeth II (1926–2022)	27 April 1961	19 April 1971	9 years, 357 days	Windsor	M. Margai; A. Margai; Stevens

=== Governor-general ===
The governor-general was the representative of the monarch in Sierra Leone and exercised most of the powers of the monarch. The governor-general was appointed for an indefinite term, serving at the pleasure of the monarch. Since Sierra Leone was granted independence by the Sierra Leone Independence Act 1961, rather than being first established as a semi-autonomous dominion and later promoted to independence as defined by the Statute of Westminster 1931, the governor-general was to be always appointed solely on the advice of the Cabinet of Sierra Leone without the involvement of the British government, with the sole exception of Maurice Henry Dorman, the former colonial governor, who served as governor-general temporarily until he was replaced by Henry Josiah Lightfoot Boston. In the event of a vacancy the chief justice would have served as the officer administering the government.

Status

Denotes Chief Justice acting as Officer Administering the Government

No.	Portrait	Name (Birth–Death)	Term of office			Monarch	Prime minister(s)
No.	Portrait	Name (Birth–Death)	Took office	Left office	Time in office	Monarch	Prime minister(s)
1		Sir Maurice Henry Dorman (1912–1993)	27 April 1961	5 May 1962	1 year, 8 days	Elizabeth II	M. Margai
2		Sir Henry Josiah Lightfoot Boston (1898–1969)	5 May 1962	11 July 1962	4 years, 322 days	Elizabeth II	M. Margai; Margai; Stevens
2		Sir Henry Josiah Lightfoot Boston (1898–1969)	11 July 1962	23 March 1967 (Deposed in a coup)	4 years, 322 days	Elizabeth II	M. Margai; Margai; Stevens
3		Sir Banja Tejan-Sie (1917–2000)	22 March 1968	29 September 1970	3 years, 9 days	Elizabeth II	Stevens
3		Sir Banja Tejan-Sie (1917–2000)	29 September 1970	31 March 1971	3 years, 9 days	Elizabeth II	Stevens
—		Christopher Okoro Cole (1921–1990)	31 March 1971	19 April 1971	19 days	Elizabeth II	Stevens

=== Military rule (1967–1968) ===
No.	Portrait	Name (Birth–Death)	Term of office			Political party
No.	Portrait	Name (Birth–Death)	Took office	Left office	Time in office	Political party
		Brigadier David Lansana (1922–1975)	21 March 1967	23 March 1967 (Deposed in a coup)	2 days	Military
		Commissioner Leslie William Leigh (1921–1980); Chairman of the NRC	23 March 1967	28 March 1967	5 days	Military
		Brigadier Andrew Juxon-Smith (1931–1996); Chairman of the NRC	28 March 1967	18 April 1968 (Deposed in a coup)	1 year, 21 days	Military
		Brigadier John Amadu Bangura (1930–1970); Chairman of the NIC and of the ACRM	18 April 1968	22 April 1968	4 days	Military

== Republic (1971–present) ==
Political parties

All People's Congress (APC)
Sierra Leone People's Party (SLPP)

Other factions

Independent
Military

Status

Denotes acting president

=== First Republic (1971–1992) ===
Under the Constitution of 1971, the first constitution of the Republic of Sierra Leone, the president replaced the monarch as ceremonial head of state; a year later the presidency became an executive head of state, The president was elected by Parliament for a four-year term. The 1978 Constitution proclaimed Sierra Leone as a one-party state, the president was elected for a seven-year term and can only serve two terms, then in 1991 a new Constitution was made to end the status as a one-party state, the president now serves a five-year term and can only serve two terms. In the event of a vacancy the vice-president served as acting president.

No.	Portrait	Name (Birth–Death)	Elected	Term of office			Political party	Prime minister(s)
No.	Portrait	Name (Birth–Death)	Elected	Took office	Left office	Time in office	Political party	Prime minister(s)
—		Christopher Okoro Cole (1921–1990)	—	19 April 1971	21 April 1971	2 days	Independent	Stevens
1		Siaka Stevens (1905–1988)	1978	21 April 1971	28 November 1985 (Retired)	14 years, 221 days	APC	Koroma; Kamara-Taylor
2		Joseph Saidu Momoh (1937–2003)	1985	28 November 1985	29 April 1992 (Deposed in a coup)	6 years, 153 days	APC	Position abolished

=== Military rule (1992–1996) ===
Valentine Strasser led a coup d'état which overthrew President Momoh and his government, again dissolving all political parties and the Parliament.

No.	Portrait	Name (Birth–Death)	Term of office			Political party
No.	Portrait	Name (Birth–Death)	Took office	Left office	Time in office	Political party
3		Captain Yahya Kanu (died 1992); Chairman of the NPDC	29 April 1992	1 May 1992	2 days	Military
4		Captain Valentine Strasser (born 1967); Chairman of the NPRC	1 May 1992	16 January 1996 (Deposed in a coup)	3 years, 260 days	Military
4		Chairman of the SCS from 6 May 1996	1 May 1992	16 January 1996 (Deposed in a coup)	3 years, 260 days	Military
5		Brigadier Julius Maada Bio (born 1964); Chairman of the SCS	16 January 1996	29 March 1996	73 days	Military

=== Second Republic (1996–1997) ===
When the civilian government was restored so was the Constitution of 1991 and in the 1996 elections the SLPP won the election for most seats in Parliament and the presidential election. In the event of a vacancy the vice-president served as acting president.

No.	Portrait	Name (Birth–Death)	Elected	Term of office			Political party
No.	Portrait	Name (Birth–Death)	Elected	Took office	Left office	Time in office	Political party
6		Ahmad Tejan Kabbah (1932–2014)	1996	29 March 1996	25 May 1997 (Deposed in a coup)	1 year, 57 days	SLPP

=== Military rule (1997–1998) ===
Major Johnny Koroma led a coup d'état which overthrew President Kabbah and his government, dissolving all political parties and the Parliament.

No.	Portrait	Name (Birth–Death)	Term of office			Political party
No.	Portrait	Name (Birth–Death)	Took office	Left office	Time in office	Political party
7		Major Johnny Paul Koroma (1960–2003); Chairman of the AFRC	25 May 1997	12 February 1998 (Deposed by ECOWAS)	263 days	Military

=== Third Republic (1998–present) ===
The civilian government was restored, as was the Constitution of 1991 and the members of Parliament and the president. In the event of a vacancy the vice-president served as acting president.

No.	Portrait	Name (Birth–Death)	Elected	Term of office			Political party
No.	Portrait	Name (Birth–Death)	Elected	Took office	Left office	Time in office	Political party
(6)		Ahmad Tejan Kabbah (1932–2014)	2002	13 February 1998	17 September 2007	9 years, 216 days	SLPP
8		Ernest Bai Koroma (born 1953)	2007; 2012	17 September 2007	4 April 2018	10 years, 199 days	APC
(5)		Julius Maada Bio (born 1964)	2018; 2023	4 April 2018	Incumbent	8 years, 142 days	SLPP

== Standards ==
Royal standard

Governor-General's standard

Presidential standard

== See also ==
- List of colonial governors of Sierra Leone
- President of Sierra Leone
- List of chief ministers and prime ministers of Sierra Leone
- Sierra Leone presidents and head of state by tribes
