= List of prime ministers of Elizabeth II =

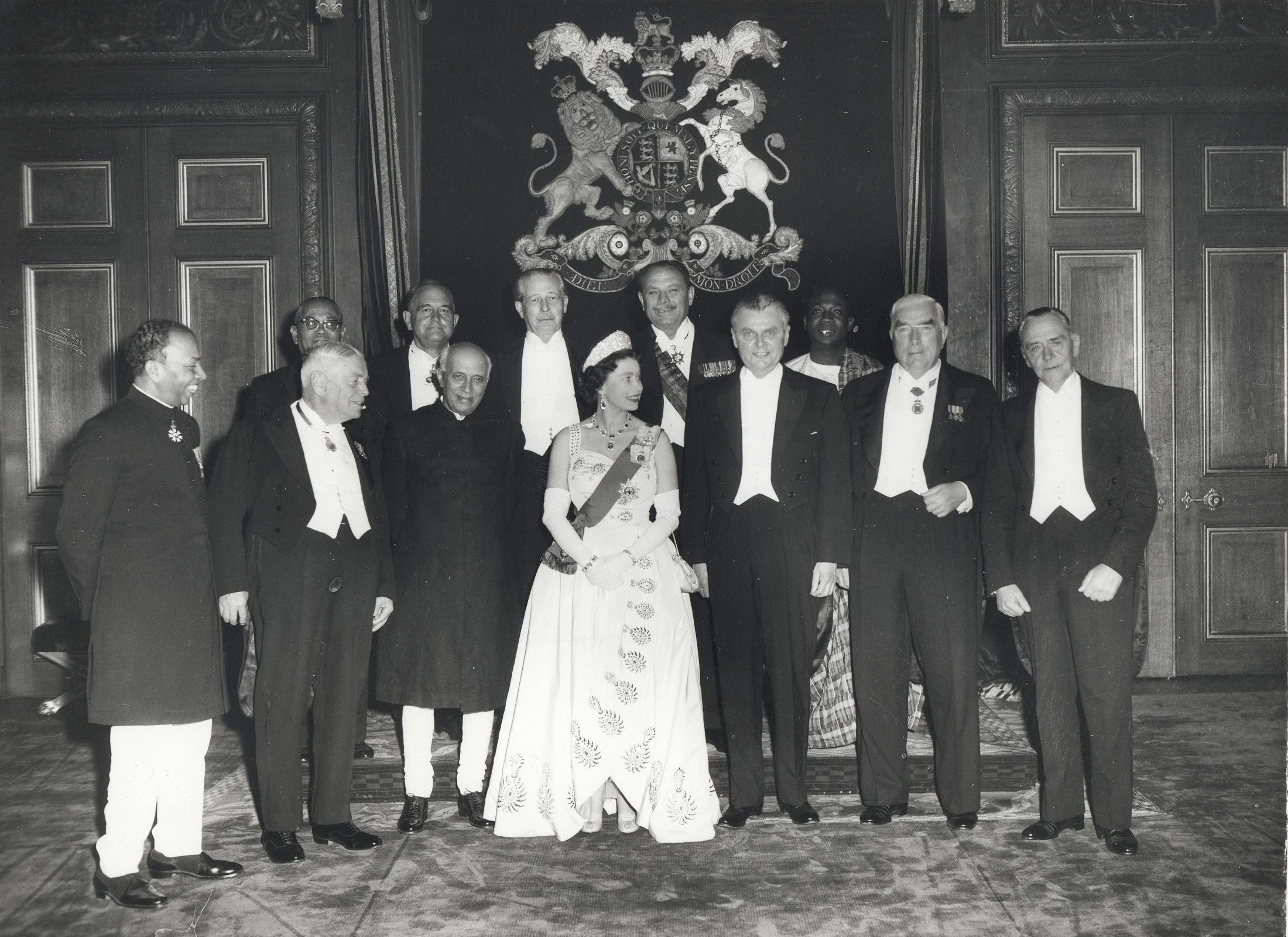
Queen Elizabeth II with several of her prime ministers and other Commonwealth leaders at the 1960 Commonwealth Prime Ministers' Conference

From becoming queen on 6 February 1952, Elizabeth II was head of state of 32 independent states; at the time of her death, there were 15 states, called Commonwealth realms. Within the Westminster system in each realm, the Queen's government was headed by a prime minister. Appointment and dismissal of prime ministers were common reserve powers that could be exercised by Elizabeth or her governors-general.

Elizabeth had 179^{N1} individuals serve as her realms' prime ministers throughout her reign, the first new appointment being Dudley Senanayake as Prime Minister of Ceylon and the final being Liz Truss as Prime Minister of the United Kingdom, whom she appointed only two days before her death; some of these individuals served multiple non-consecutive terms in office (always of the same nation state) as prime minister. Several of her prime ministers from various realms were appointed (for life) to the Privy Council of the United Kingdom.

This list does not cover Commonwealth nations that were not Commonwealth realms at any point during Elizabeth's reign, nor holders of offices of prime minister in colonies or sub-national entities such as states or provinces.

== List of prime ministers ==
=== Antigua and Barbuda ===
Antigua and Barbuda became independent on 1 November 1981 with Vere Bird as the first prime minister. Bird had previously been Premier of Antigua.

No	Portrait	Name	Lifespan	Tenure	
No	Portrait	Name	Lifespan	Took office	Left office
1		Vere Bird	1909–1999	1 November 1981	9 March 1994
2		Lester Bird	1938–2021	9 March 1994	24 August 2004
3		Baldwin Spencer	b. 1948	24 August 2004	13 June 2014
4		Gaston Browne	b. 1967	13 June 2014	Incumbent

=== Australia ===
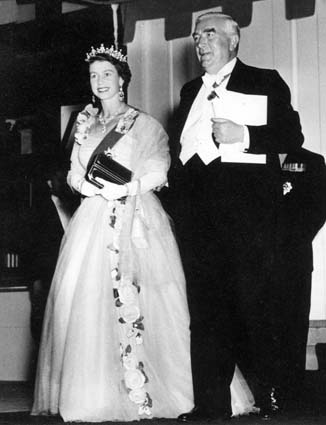
Queen Elizabeth II with Prime Minister of Australia Robert Menzies during her first tour of Australia in 1954

Robert Menzies was the incumbent prime minister when Elizabeth became queen.

No	Portrait	Name	Lifespan	Tenure	
No	Portrait	Name	Lifespan	Took office	Left office
1		Robert Menzies	1894–1978	19 December 1949	26 January 1966
2		Harold Holt	1908–1967	26 January 1966	19 December 1967
3		John McEwen	1900–1980	19 December 1967	10 January 1968
4		John Gorton	1911–2002	10 January 1968	10 March 1971
5		William McMahon	1908–1988	10 March 1971	5 December 1972
6		Gough Whitlam	1916–2014	5 December 1972	11 November 1975
7		Malcolm Fraser	1930–2015	11 November 1975	11 March 1983
8		Bob Hawke	1929–2019	11 March 1983	20 December 1991
9		Paul Keating	b. 1944	20 December 1991	11 March 1996
10		John Howard	b. 1939	11 March 1996	3 December 2007
11		Kevin Rudd	b. 1957	3 December 2007	24 June 2010
12		Julia Gillard	b. 1961	24 June 2010	27 June 2013
(11)		Kevin Rudd	b. 1957	27 June 2013	18 September 2013
13		Tony Abbott	b. 1957	18 September 2013	15 September 2015
14		Malcolm Turnbull	b. 1954	15 September 2015	24 August 2018
15		Scott Morrison	b. 1968	24 August 2018	23 May 2022
16		Anthony Albanese	b. 1963	23 May 2022	Incumbent

=== The Bahamas ===
The Bahamas became independent on 10 July 1973 with Lynden Pindling as the first prime minister. Pindling had previously been the prime minister of the self-governing Commonwealth of the Bahama Islands.

No	Portrait	Name	Lifespan	Tenure	
No	Portrait	Name	Lifespan	Took office	Left office
1		Lynden Pindling	1930–2000	10 July 1973	21 August 1992
2		Hubert Ingraham	b. 1947	21 August 1992	3 May 2002
3		Perry Christie	b. 1943^{N2}	3 May 2002	4 May 2007
(2)		Hubert Ingraham	b. 1947	4 May 2007	8 May 2012
(3)		Perry Christie	b. 1943	8 May 2012	11 May 2017
4		Hubert Minnis	b. 1954	11 May 2017	17 September 2021
5		Philip Davis	b. 1951	17 September 2021	Incumbent

=== Barbados ===
Barbados became independent on 30 November 1966 with Errol Barrow as the first prime minister. Barrow had previously been Premier of Barbados.

No	Portrait	Name	Lifespan	Tenure	
No	Portrait	Name	Lifespan	Took office	Left office
1		Errol Barrow	1920–1987	30 November 1966	8 September 1976
2		Tom Adams	1931–1985	8 September 1976	11 March 1985
3		Harold Bernard St. John	1931–2004	11 March 1985	29 May 1986
(1)		Errol Barrow	1920–1987	29 May 1986	1 June 1987
4		Lloyd Erskine Sandiford	1937–2023	1 June 1987	7 September 1994
5		Owen Arthur	1945–2020	7 September 1994	16 January 2008
6		David Thompson	1961–2010	16 January 2008	23 October 2010
7		Freundel Stuart	b. 1951	23 October 2010	25 May 2018
8		Mia Mottley	b. 1965	25 May 2018	Incumbent

Barbados abolished its monarchy and became a parliamentary republic on 30 November 2021. Mottley remained in office as the republic's first prime minister.

=== Belize ===
Belize became independent on 21 September 1981 with George Cadle Price as the first prime minister. Price had previously been Premier of Belize.

No	Portrait	Name	Lifespan	Tenure	
No	Portrait	Name	Lifespan	Took office	Left office
1		George Cadle Price	1919–2011	21 September 1981	17 December 1984
2		Manuel Esquivel	1940–2022	17 December 1984	7 November 1989
(1)		George Cadle Price	1919–2011	7 November 1989	3 July 1993
(2)		Manuel Esquivel	1940–2022	3 July 1993	28 August 1998
3		Said Musa	b. 1944	28 August 1998	8 February 2008
4		Dean Barrow	b. 1951	8 February 2008	12 November 2020
5		Johnny Briceño	b. 1960	12 November 2020	Incumbent

=== Canada ===
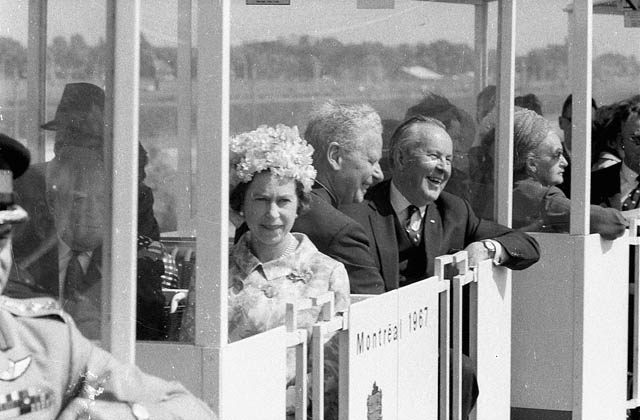
Queen Elizabeth II with Prime Minister Lester B. Pearson and John Diefenbaker at Expo 67 in Montreal, Quebec

Louis St. Laurent was the incumbent prime minister when Elizabeth became queen.

No	Portrait	Name	Lifespan	Tenure	
No	Portrait	Name	Lifespan	Took office	Left office
1		Louis St. Laurent	1882–1973	15 November 1948	21 June 1957
2		John Diefenbaker	1895–1979	21 June 1957	22 April 1963
3		Lester B. Pearson	1897–1972	22 April 1963	20 April 1968
4		Pierre Trudeau	1919–2000	20 April 1968	4 June 1979
5		Joe Clark	b. 1939	4 June 1979	3 March 1980
(4)		Pierre Trudeau	1919–2000	3 March 1980	30 June 1984
6		John Turner	1929–2020	30 June 1984	17 September 1984
7		Brian Mulroney	1939–2024	17 September 1984	25 June 1993
8		Kim Campbell	b. 1947	25 June 1993	4 November 1993
9		Jean Chrétien	b. 1934	4 November 1993	12 December 2003
10		Paul Martin	b. 1938	12 December 2003	6 February 2006
11		Stephen Harper	b. 1959	6 February 2006	4 November 2015
12		Justin Trudeau	b. 1971	4 November 2015	14 March 2025

=== Ceylon ===
D. S. Senanayake was the incumbent prime minister of Ceylon when Elizabeth became queen.

No	Portrait	Name	Lifespan	Tenure	
No	Portrait	Name	Lifespan	Took office	Left office
1		D. S. Senanayake	1883–1952	24 September 1947	22 March 1952
2		Dudley Senanayake	1911–1973	26 March 1952	12 October 1953
3		John Kotelawala	1895–1980	12 October 1953	12 April 1956
4		S. W. R. D. Bandaranaike	1899–1959	12 April 1956	26 September 1959
5		Wijeyananda Dahanayake	1901–1997	26 September 1959	20 March 1960
(2)		Dudley Senanayake	1911–1973	21 March 1960	21 July 1960
6		Sirimavo Bandaranaike	1916–2000	21 July 1960	27 March 1965
(2)		Dudley Senanayake	1911–1973	27 March 1965	29 May 1970
(6)		Sirimavo Bandaranaike	1916–2000	29 May 1970	23 July 1977

Ceylon abolished the monarchy on 22 May 1972 and became the Republic of Sri Lanka. Bandaranaike remained in office as the republic's first prime minister until 23 July 1977.

=== Fiji ===
Fiji became independent on 10 October 1970 with Kamisese Mara as the first prime minister. Mara had previously been Chief Minister of Fiji.

No	Portrait	Name	Lifespan	Tenure	
No	Portrait	Name	Lifespan	Took office	Left office
1		Kamisese Mara	1920–2004	10 October 1970	13 April 1987
2		Timoci Bavadra	1934–1989	13 April 1987	14 May 1987

Following the 1987 Fijian coups d'état (which resulted in a vacancy in the premiership until December 1987), on 7 October 1987, the new ruling regime declared the nation to have become the Republic of Fiji. Fiji's relationship with the monarchy after this transition is complex (see Monarchy of Fiji).

=== Gambia ===
The Gambia became independent on 18 February 1965 with Dawda Jawara as the first prime minister. Jawara had previously been prime minister of the self-governing Gambia.

No	Portrait	Name	Lifespan	Tenure	
No	Portrait	Name	Lifespan	Took office	Left office
1		Dawda Jawara	1924–2019	6 March 1965	24 April 1970

The Gambia abolished the monarchy on 24 April 1970, via referendum. Jawara became President of the Gambia on the same day as the post of prime minister was abolished.

=== Ghana ===
Ghana became independent on 15 August 1957, with Kwame Nkrumah as its first prime minister. Nkrumah had previously been prime minister of the self-governing Gold Coast.

No	Portrait	Name	Lifespan	Tenure	
No	Portrait	Name	Lifespan	Took office	Left office
1		Kwame Nkrumah	1909–1972	15 August 1957	1 July 1960

Ghana abolished the monarchy on 1 July 1960, via referendum. Nkrumah became President of Ghana on the same day as the post of prime minister was abolished.

=== Grenada ===
Grenada became independent on 7 February 1974 with Eric Gairy as the first prime minister. Gairy had previously been Premier of Grenada.

No	Portrait	Name	Lifespan	Tenure	
No	Portrait	Name	Lifespan	Took office	Left office
1		Eric Gairy	1922–1997	7 February 1974	13 March 1979
2		Maurice Bishop see § Grenada (1979–1984)	1944–1983	13 March 1979	19 October 1983
3		Herbert Blaize	1918–1989	4 December 1984	19 December 1989
4		Ben Jones	1924–2005	19 December 1989	16 March 1990
5		Nicholas Brathwaite	1925–2016	16 March 1990	1 February 1995
6		George Brizan	1942–2012	1 February 1995	22 June 1995
7		Keith Mitchell	b. 1946	22 June 1995	9 July 2008
8		Tillman Thomas	b. 1947	9 July 2008	20 February 2013
(7)		Keith Mitchell	b. 1946	20 February 2013	24 June 2022
9		Dickon Mitchell	b. 1978	24 June 2022	Incumbent

=== Guyana ===
Guyana became independent on 26 May 1966, with Forbes Burnham as its first prime minister. Burnham had previously been Premier of British Guiana.

No	Portrait	Name	Lifespan	Tenure	
No	Portrait	Name	Lifespan	Took office	Left office
1		Forbes Burnham	1923–1985	26 May 1966	6 October 1980

Guyana abolished the monarchy on 23 February 1970. Burnham remained in office as the republic's first prime minister until 6 October 1980.

=== Jamaica ===
Jamaica became independent on 6 August 1962 with Alexander Bustamante as the first prime minister. Bustamante had previously been Premier of Jamaica.

No	Portrait	Name	Lifespan	Tenure	
No	Portrait	Name	Lifespan	Took office	Left office
1		Alexander Bustamante	1884–1977	6 August 1962	23 February 1967
2		Donald Sangster	1911–1967	23 February 1967	11 April 1967
3		Hugh Shearer	1923–2004	11 April 1967	2 March 1972
4		Michael Manley	1924–1997	2 March 1972	1 November 1980
5		Edward Seaga	1930–2019	1 November 1980	10 February 1989
(4)		Michael Manley	1924–1997	10 February 1989	30 March 1992
6		P. J. Patterson	b. 1935	30 March 1992	30 March 2006
7		Portia Simpson-Miller	b. 1945	30 March 2006	11 September 2007
8		Bruce Golding	b. 1947	11 September 2007	23 October 2011
9		Andrew Holness	b. 1972	23 October 2011	5 January 2012
(7)		Portia Simpson-Miller	b. 1945	5 January 2012	3 March 2016
(9)		Andrew Holness	b. 1972	3 March 2016	Incumbent

=== Kenya ===
Kenya became independent on 12 December 1963, with Jomo Kenyatta becoming the first prime minister. Kenyatta had previously been prime minister of self-governing Kenya.

No	Portrait	Name	Lifespan	Tenure	
No	Portrait	Name	Lifespan	Took office	Left office
1		Jomo Kenyatta	1891–1978	12 December 1963	12 December 1964

Kenya abolished the monarchy on 12 December 1964. Kenyatta became President of Kenya as the post of prime minister was abolished.

=== Malawi ===
Malawi became independent on 6 July 1964, with Hastings Banda as prime minister. Banda had previously been prime minister of self-governing Nyasaland.

No	Portrait	Name	Lifespan	Tenure	
No	Portrait	Name	Lifespan	Took office	Left office
1		Hastings Banda	1898–1997	6 July 1964	6 July 1966

Malawi abolished the monarchy on 6 July 1966. Banda became President of Malawi as the post of prime minister was abolished.

=== Malta ===
The Crown Colony of Malta became independent as the State of Malta on 21 September 1964 with George Borg Olivier as prime minister. Olivier had previously been the colony's prime minister.

No	Portrait	Name	Lifespan	Tenure	
No	Portrait	Name	Lifespan	Took office	Left office
1		George Borg Olivier	1911–1980	21 September 1964	21 June 1971
2		Dom Mintoff	1916–2012	21 June 1971	22 December 1984

Malta abolished the monarchy on 13 December 1974 and became the current Republic of Malta, a republic within the Commonwealth. Mintoff remained in office as the republic's first prime minister until 22 December 1984.

=== Mauritius ===
Mauritius became independent on 12 March 1968, with Seewoosagur Ramgoolam becoming the first prime minister. Ramgoolam had previously been Chief Minister of Mauritius.

No	Portrait	Name	Lifespan	Tenure	
No	Portrait	Name	Lifespan	Took office	Left office
1		Seewoosagur Ramgoolam	1900–1985	12 March 1968	15 June 1982
2		Anerood Jugnauth	1930–2021	15 June 1982	27 December 1995

Mauritius abolished the monarchy on 12 March 1992. Jugnauth remained in office as the republic's prime minister until 15 December 1995.

=== New Zealand ===
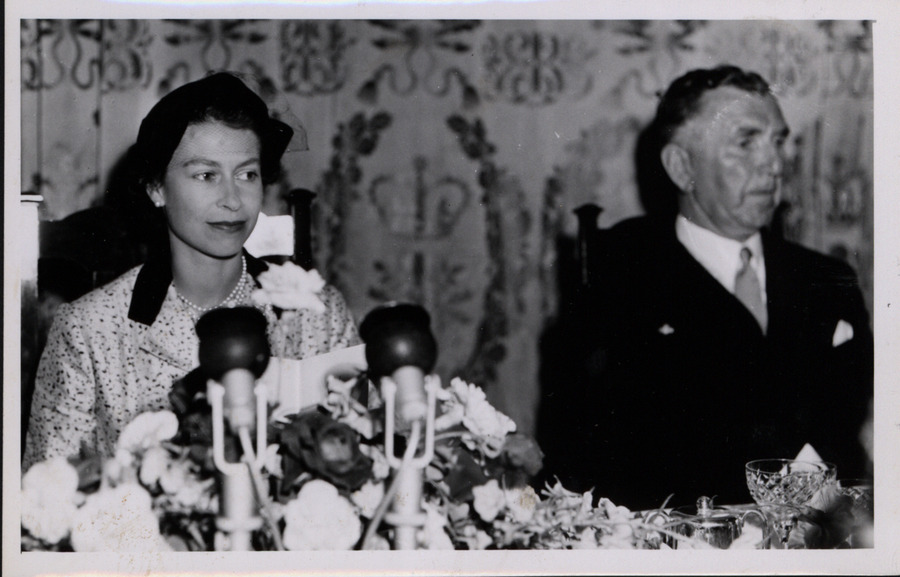
The Queen with Sidney Holland during her tour of New Zealand, 1953

Sidney Holland was the incumbent prime minister when Elizabeth became queen.

No	Portrait	Name	Lifespan	Tenure	
No	Portrait	Name	Lifespan	Took office	Left office
1		Sidney Holland	1893–1961	13 December 1949	20 September 1957
2		Keith Holyoake	1904–1983	20 September 1957	12 December 1957
3		Walter Nash	1882–1968	12 December 1957	12 December 1960
(2)		Keith Holyoake	1904–1983	12 December 1960	7 February 1972
4		Jack Marshall	1912–1988	7 February 1972	8 December 1972
5		Norman Kirk	1923–1974	8 December 1972	31 August 1974†
—N/a		Hugh Watt; Acting prime minister	1912–1980	31 August 1974	6 September 1974
6		Bill Rowling	1927–1995	6 September 1974	12 December 1975
7		Robert Muldoon	1921–1992	12 December 1975	26 July 1984
8		David Lange	1942–2005	26 July 1984	8 August 1989
9		Geoffrey Palmer	b. 1942	8 August 1989	4 September 1990
10		Mike Moore	1949–2020	4 September 1990	2 November 1990
11		Jim Bolger	1935–2025	2 November 1990	8 December 1997
12		Jenny Shipley	b. 1952	8 December 1997	5 December 1999
13		Helen Clark	b. 1950	5 December 1999	19 November 2008
14		John Key	b. 1961	19 November 2008	12 December 2016
15		Bill English	b. 1961	12 December 2016	26 October 2017
16		Jacinda Ardern	b. 1980	26 October 2017	25 January 2023

=== Nigeria ===
The Federation of Nigeria became independent on 1 October 1960, with Abubakar Tafawa Balewa becoming the first prime minister. Balewa had previously been Chief Minister of the Colony and Protectorate of Nigeria.

No	Portrait	Name	Lifespan	Tenure	
No	Portrait	Name	Lifespan	Took office	Left office
1		Abubakar Tafawa Balewa	1912–1966	1 October 1960	15 January 1966†

Nigeria became the Federal Republic of Nigeria on 1 October 1963. Balewa remained in office as the republic's prime minister until his overthrow and assassination in the 1966 Nigerian coup d'état on 15 January 1966.

=== Pakistan ===
Khawaja Nazimuddin was the incumbent prime minister when Elizabeth became queen.

No	Portrait	Name	Lifespan	Tenure	
No	Portrait	Name	Lifespan	Took office	Left office
1		Khawaja Nazimuddin	1894–1964	17 October 1951	17 April 1953
2		Mohammad Ali Bogra	1909–1963	17 April 1953	12 August 1955
3		Chaudhry Muhammad Ali	1905–1982	12 August 1955	12 September 1956

Pakistan abolished the monarchy on 23 March 1956. Ali remained in office as the republic's first prime minister until 12 September 1956.

=== Papua New Guinea ===
Papua New Guinea became independent on 16 September 1975 with Michael Somare as the first prime minister. Somare had previously been Chief Minister of Papua New Guinea.

No	Portrait	Name	Lifespan	Tenure	
No	Portrait	Name	Lifespan	Took office	Left office
1		Michael Somare	1936–2021	16 September 1975	11 March 1980
2		Julius Chan	1939–2025	11 March 1980	2 August 1982
(1)		Michael Somare	1936–2021	2 August 1982	21 November 1985
3		Paias Wingti	b. 1951	21 November 1985	4 July 1988
4		Rabbie Namaliu	b. 1947	4 July 1988	17 July 1992
(3)		Paias Wingti	b. 1951	17 July 1992	30 August 1994
(2)		Julius Chan	1939–2025	30 August 1994	27 March 1997
—N/a		John Giheno; Acting prime minister^{N3}	1950–2017	27 March 1997	2 June 1997
(2)		Julius Chan	1939–2025	2 June 1997	22 July 1997
5		Bill Skate	1953–2006	22 July 1997	14 July 1999
6		Mekere Morauta	1946–2020	14 July 1999	5 August 2002
(1)		Michael Somare	1936–2021^{N4}	5 August 2002	2 August 2011 / 3 August 2012^{N5}
7		Peter O'Neill	b. 1965	2 August 2011 / 3 August 2012^{N5}	30 May 2019
8		James Marape	b. 1971	30 May 2019	Incumbent

=== Rhodesia ===
See § Rhodesia (1965–1970) below.

=== Saint Kitts and Nevis ===
Saint Kitts and Nevis became independent on 19 September 1983 with Kennedy Simmonds as the first prime minister. Simmonds had previously been Premier of Saint Kitts and Nevis.

No	Portrait	Name	Lifespan	Tenure	
No	Portrait	Name	Lifespan	Took office	Left office
1		Kennedy Simmonds	b. 1936	19 September 1983	7 July 1995
2		Denzil Douglas	b. 1953	7 July 1995	18 February 2015
3		Timothy Harris	b. 1964	18 February 2015	6 August 2022
4		Terrance Drew	b. 1976	6 August 2022	Incumbent

=== Saint Lucia ===
Saint Lucia became independent on 22 February 1979 with John Compton as the first prime minister. Compton had previously been Premier of Saint Lucia.

No	Portrait	Name	Lifespan	Tenure	
No	Portrait	Name	Lifespan	Took office	Left office
1		John Compton	1925–2007	22 February 1979	2 July 1979
2		Allan Louisy	1916–2011	2 July 1979	4 May 1981
3		Winston Cenac	1925–2004	4 May 1981	17 January 1982
—N/a		Michael Pilgrim; Acting prime minister	b. 1947	17 January 1982	3 May 1982
(1)		John Compton	1925–2007	3 May 1982	2 April 1996
4		Vaughan Lewis	b. 1940	2 April 1996	24 May 1997
5		Kenny Anthony	b. 1951	24 May 1997	15 December 2006
(1)		John Compton	1925–2007	15 December 2006	7 September 2007
6		Stephenson King	b. 1958	7 September 2007	30 November 2011
(5)		Kenny Anthony	b. 1951	30 November 2011	7 June 2016
7		Allen Chastanet	b. 1960	7 June 2016	28 July 2021
8		Philip Pierre	b. 1954	28 July 2021	Incumbent

=== Saint Vincent and the Grenadines ===
Saint Vincent and the Grenadines became independent on 27 October 1979 with Milton Cato as the first prime minister. Cato had previously been Premier of Saint Vincent.

No	Portrait	Name	Lifespan	Tenure	
No	Portrait	Name	Lifespan	Took office	Left office
1		Milton Cato	1915–1997	27 October 1979	30 July 1984
2		James Fitz-Allen Mitchell	1931–2021	30 July 1984	27 October 2000
3		Arnhim Eustace	b. 1944	27 October 2000	29 March 2001
4		Ralph Gonsalves	b. 1946	29 March 2001	28 November 2025

=== Sierra Leone ===
Sierra Leone became independent on 27 April 1961, with Milton Margai as the first prime minister. Margai had previously been Prime Minister of the Protectorate of Sierra Leone.

No	Portrait	Name	Lifespan	Tenure	
No	Portrait	Name	Lifespan	Took office	Left office
1		Milton Margai	1895–1964	27 April 1961	28 April 1964
2		Albert Margai	1910–1980	28 April 1964	21 March 1967
3		Siaka Stevens	1905–1988	28 April 1967	21 April 1971

Siaka Stevens assumed the role of prime minister following his party's narrow victory in the 1967 general election. However, immediately after taking office, Stevens was deposed by the National Reformation Council in a coup d'état and placed under house arrest. Military rule persisted until an April 1968 counter-coup restored Stevens' premiership.

Sierra Leone became the Republic of Sierra Leone on 19 April 1971. Stevens left the office of prime minister two days later and became President of Sierra Leone. The office of the prime minister was later abolished on 15 June 1978.

=== Solomon Islands ===
The Solomon Islands became independent on 7 July 1978 with Peter Kenilorea as the first prime minister.

No	Portrait	Name	Lifespan	Tenure	
No	Portrait	Name	Lifespan	Took office	Left office
1		Peter Kenilorea	1943–2016	7 July 1978	31 August 1981
2		Solomon Mamaloni	1943–2000	31 August 1981	19 November 1984
(1)		Peter Kenilorea	1943–2016	19 November 1984	1 December 1986
3		Ezekiel Alebua	1947–2022	1 December 1986	28 March 1989
(2)		Solomon Mamaloni	1943–2000	28 March 1989	18 June 1993
4		Francis Billy Hilly	1948–2025	18 June 1993	7 November 1994
(2)		Solomon Mamaloni	1943–2000	7 November 1994	27 August 1997
5		Bartholomew Ulufa'alu	1950–2007	27 August 1997	30 June 2000
6		Manasseh Sogavare	b. 1955	30 June 2000	17 December 2001
7		Allan Kemakeza	b. 1950	17 December 2001	20 April 2006
8		Snyder Rini	1949–2025	20 April 2006	4 May 2006
(6)		Manasseh Sogavare	b. 1955	4 May 2006	20 December 2007
9		Derek Sikua	b. 1959	20 December 2007	25 August 2010
10		Danny Philip	b. 1953	25 August 2010	16 November 2011
11		Gordon Darcy Lilo	b. 1965	16 November 2011	9 December 2014
(6)		Manasseh Sogavare	b. 1955	9 December 2014	15 November 2017
12		Rick Houenipwela	b. 1958	15 November 2017	24 April 2019
(6)		Manasseh Sogavare	b. 1955	24 April 2019	2 May 2024

=== South Africa ===
Daniel François Malan was the incumbent prime minister of the Union of South Africa when Elizabeth became queen.

No	Portrait	Name	Lifespan	Tenure	
No	Portrait	Name	Lifespan	Took office	Left office
1		Daniel François Malan	1874–1959	4 June 1948	30 November 1954
2		Johannes Gerhardus Strijdom	1893–1958	30 November 1954	24 August 1958
3		Hendrik Verwoerd	1901–1966	24 August 1958	6 September 1966†

Following a referendum, South Africa abolished the monarchy on 31 May 1961, becoming the Republic of South Africa. Verwoerd remained in office as the republic's first prime minister until his assassination on 6 September 1966. The office of the prime minister was later abolished on 14 September 1984.

=== Tanganyika ===
Tanganyika became independent on 9 December 1961, with Julius Nyerere as its first prime minister. Nyerere had previously been the prime minister of self-governing Tanganyika.

No	Portrait	Name	Lifespan	Tenure	
No	Portrait	Name	Lifespan	Took office	Left office
1		Julius Nyerere	1922–1999	9 December 1961	22 January 1962
2		Rashidi Kawawa	1926–2009	22 January 1962	9 December 1962

Tanganyika abolished the monarchy on 9 December 1962. The post of prime minister was also abolished. Kawawa took office once again as the prime minister of Tanzania in 1972.

=== Trinidad and Tobago ===
Trinidad and Tobago became independent on 31 August 1962, with Eric Williams as its first prime minister. Williams had previously been Chief Minister and Premier of Trinidad and Tobago.

No	Portrait	Name	Lifespan	Tenure	
No	Portrait	Name	Lifespan	Took office	Left office
1		Eric Williams	1911–1981	31 August 1962	29 March 1981

Trinidad and Tobago abolished the monarchy on 1 August 1976. Williams remained in office as the republic's first prime minister until 29 March 1981.

=== Tuvalu ===
Tuvalu became independent on 1 October 1978 with Toaripi Lauti as the first prime minister. Lauti had previously been Chief Minister of Tuvalu.

No	Portrait	Name	Lifespan	Tenure	
No	Portrait	Name	Lifespan	Took office	Left office
1		Toaripi Lauti	1928–2014	1 October 1978	8 September 1981
2		Tomasi Puapua	b. 1938	8 September 1981	16 October 1989
3		Bikenibeu Paeniu	b. 1956	16 October 1989	10 December 1993
4		Kamuta Latasi	b. 1936	10 December 1993	24 December 1996
(3)		Bikenibeu Paeniu	b. 1956	24 December 1996	27 April 1999
5		Ionatana Ionatana	1938–2000	27 April 1999	8 December 2000
—N/a		Lagitupu Tuilimu; Acting prime minister^{N6}	—N/a	8 December 2000	24 February 2001
6		Faimalaga Luka	1940–2005	24 February 2001	14 December 2001
7		Koloa Talake	1934–2008	14 December 2001	24 August 2002
8		Saufatu Sopoanga	1952–2020	24 August 2002	25 August 2004
9		Maatia Toafa	1954–2024	11 October 2004	14 August 2006
10		Apisai Ielemia	1955–2018	14 August 2006	29 September 2010
(9)		Maatia Toafa	1954–2024	29 September 2010	24 December 2010
11		Willy Telavi	b. 1954	24 December 2010	1 August 2013
12		Enele Sopoaga	b. 1956^{N7}	5 August 2013	19 September 2019
13		Kausea Natano	b. 1957	19 September 2019	26 February 2024

=== Uganda ===
Uganda became independent on 9 October 1962 with Milton Obote as the first prime minister. Obote had previously been the prime minister of self-governing Uganda.

No	Portrait	Name	Lifespan	Tenure	
No	Portrait	Name	Lifespan	Took office	Left office
1		Milton Obote	1925–2005	9 October 1962	15 April 1966

Uganda abolished the monarchy^{N8} on 9 October 1963. Obote remained in office as the republic's first prime minister until 15 April 1966.

=== United Kingdom ===
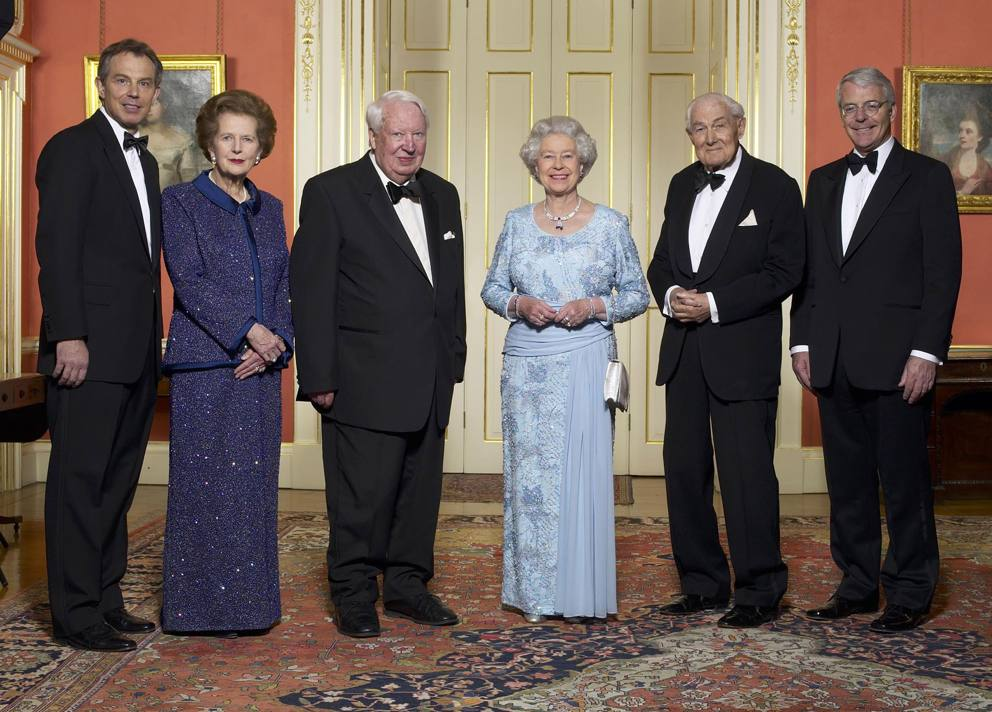
Queen Elizabeth II with British Prime Minister Tony Blair and former prime ministers Margaret Thatcher, Edward Heath, James Callaghan, and John Major during her Golden Jubilee in 2002

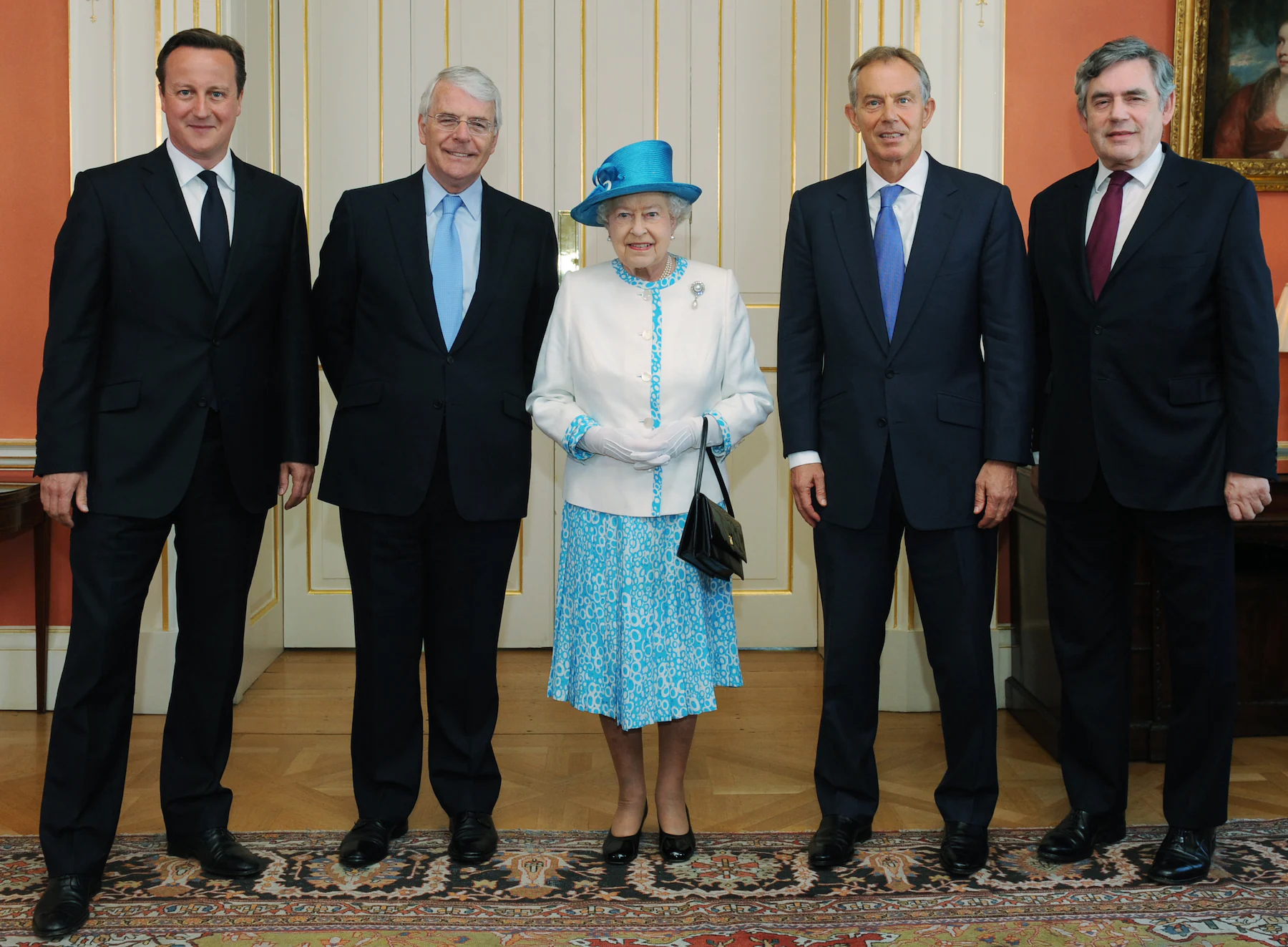
Queen Elizabeth II with British Prime Minister David Cameron and former prime ministers John Major, Tony Blair, and Gordon Brown during her Diamond Jubilee in 2012

Winston Churchill was the incumbent prime minister when Elizabeth became queen.

No	Portrait	Name	Lifespan	Tenure	
No	Portrait	Name	Lifespan	Took office	Left office
1		Winston Churchill	1874–1965	26 October 1951	5 April 1955
2		Anthony Eden	1897–1977	6 April 1955	9 January 1957
3		Harold Macmillan	1894–1986	10 January 1957	18 October 1963
4		Alec Douglas-Home	1903–1995	19 October 1963	16 October 1964
5		Harold Wilson	1916–1995	16 October 1964	19 June 1970
6		Edward Heath	1916–2005	19 June 1970	4 March 1974
(5)		Harold Wilson	1916–1995	4 March 1974	5 April 1976
7		James Callaghan	1912–2005	5 April 1976	4 May 1979
8		Margaret Thatcher	1925–2013	4 May 1979	28 November 1990
9		John Major	b. 1943	28 November 1990	2 May 1997
10		Tony Blair	b. 1953	2 May 1997	27 June 2007
11		Gordon Brown	b. 1951	27 June 2007	11 May 2010
12		David Cameron	b. 1966	11 May 2010	13 July 2016
13		Theresa May	b. 1956	13 July 2016	24 July 2019
14		Boris Johnson	b. 1964	24 July 2019	6 September 2022
15		Liz Truss	b. 1975	6 September 2022	25 October 2022

== Anomalous cases ==
=== Grenada (1979–1984) ===
On 13 March 1979, when Grenadan Prime Minister Eric Gairy was out of the country, a coup led by the New JEWEL Movement brought the People's Revolutionary Government to power. This government was led de facto by Maurice Bishop, who used the title "Prime Minister." Bishop had not been formally appointed to the role by Governor-General Paul Scoon, but the Revolutionary Government issued laws retaining the Queen as head of state and the Governor-General as her representative, and relations between Scoon and Bishop remained cordial. On 14 October 1983 Bishop was deposed by Bernard Coard, who held power only briefly before being deposed himself by Hudson Austin on 19 October; Bishop was killed the same day and a military government was declared. In the aftermath of the invasion of Grenada by the United States, Scoon invoked the reserve powers of his office as laid out in the pre-revolutionary Grenadan constitution to declare a state of emergency and take on executive and legislative power for himself, appointing Nicholas Brathwaite as chairman of an interim advisory council on 9 December 1983. The pre-revolutionary system of government and the office of Prime Minister were fully restored on 4 December 1984 in the aftermath of new elections, and Brathwaite would himself be elected Prime Minister in 1990. The Grenadian government acknowledges Bishop as a former prime minister with Brathwaite as his successor, and does not recognize Coard or any other individual who held de facto or de jure power in this period.

=== Rhodesia (1965–1970) ===
Created in 1923, Southern Rhodesia was a colony, not a dominion, but it enjoyed substantial autonomy, with its head of government participating in imperial conferences and some sources calling it a "quasi-dominion." Ian Smith became Prime Minister in 1964. In order avoid sharing power with the country's black majority, his government issued a unilateral declaration of independence on 11 November 1965, changing the state's name to Rhodesia. An annex to the UDI declared that the new state would retain the monarchy and recognised Elizabeth as Queen of Rhodesia, but she did not accept this title. Acting in his vice-regal capacity and under direction from the UK government, the Governor of Southern Rhodesia, Humphrey Gibbs, dismissed the prime minister and his government, but Smith ignored this action. The state remained unrecognised by the United Kingdom and the wider international community. Following a referendum, Rhodesia declared itself a republic on 2 March 1970. Smith remained in office throughout this period.

== See also ==
- List of Commonwealth heads of government

== Notes ==
1. The occurrence of some anomalous cases means there is a small degree of ambiguity to this figure.
2. After Christie suffered a stroke Cynthia A. Pratt served as acting prime minister from 4 May to 22 June 2005.
3. Due to the Sandline affair, Chan resigned as prime minister on 27 March 1997 and Giheno took over as acting Prime Minister. He regained the position on 2 June 1997, shortly before being ousted in a general election.
4. For two periods in this term of Somare's premiership Sam Abal was acting prime minister.
5. See 2011–12 Papua New Guinean constitutional crisis for details on the dispute between Somare and O'Neill as to who legitimately held the position of prime minister in this time. This period of ambiguity spans the time between the later-disputed dismissal of Somare from office and the implementation of the results of the 2012 general election.
6. Tuilimu served as acting prime minister following the death of Ionatana.
7. Telavi was removed from office on 1 August 2013. Sopoaga briefly served as acting prime minister before being sworn in as prime minister on 5 August 2013
8. A constitutional change ended Elizabeth II's reign in Uganda on 9 October 1963 though Uganda did not formally use the term "Republic" until 1966.
