= List of chief ministers and prime ministers of Sierra Leone =

Chief Minister of Sierra Leone
- Chif Minista fɔ Salone (Krio)
- Coat of arms of Sierra Leone

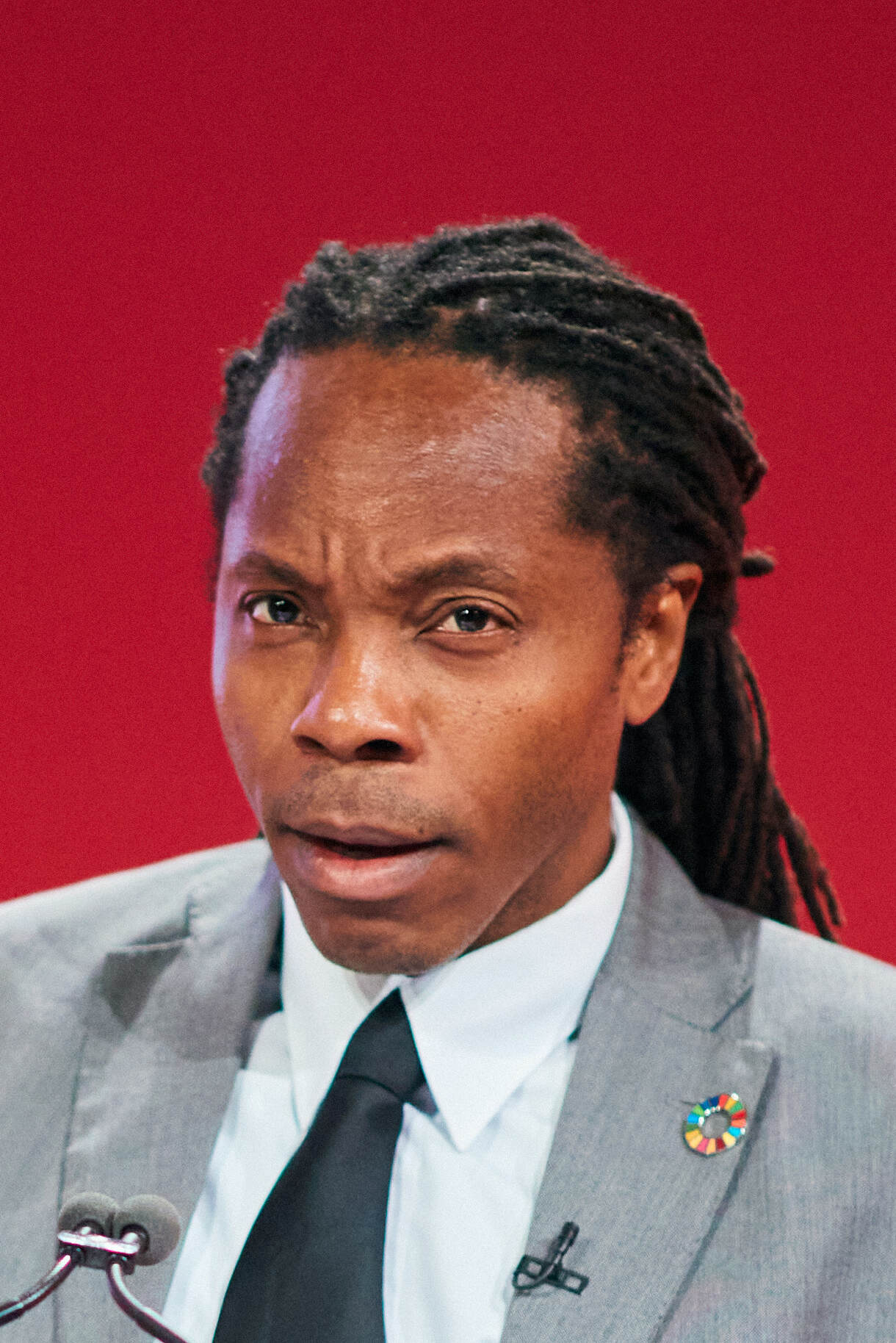
- Incumbent; David Moinina Sengeh since 10 July 2023
- Appointer: Governor-General of Sierra Leone (1961–1971); President of Sierra Leone (1971–1978, 2018–present)
- Formation: 27 April 1961; 8 May 2018 (restored)
- First holder: Milton Margai
- Abolished: 15 June 1978 – 8 May 2018

This is a list of chief ministers and prime ministers of Sierra Leone, from the establishment of the office of Chief Minister in 1954 until the present day. The office of Prime Minister was abolished after the constitutional referendum in 1978, and reinstated in 2018 with the appointment of David J. Francis. The Chief Minister is not the head of government of Sierra Leone which uses a presidential system with a executive president and has since the end of the Monarchy of Sierra Leone in 1971.

== List of officeholders ==
Political parties

Sierra Leone People's Party (SLPP)
All People's Congress (APC)

Other factions

Independent
Military

Symbols

^{†} Died in office

=== Chief minister of Sierra Leone Protectorate ===
In 1953, Sierra Leone was granted local ministerial powers and Milton Margai was made Chief Minister and later prime minister. A new constitution ensured Sierra Leone a parliamentary system within the Commonwealth of Nations and was formally adopted in 1958.

No.	Portrait	Name (Birth–Death)	Election	Term of office			Political party
No.	Portrait	Name (Birth–Death)	Election	Took office	Left office	Time in office	Political party
1		Sir Milton Margai (1895–1964)	1951; 1957	9 July 1954	14 August 1958	4 years, 36 days	SLPP

=== Prime minister of Sierra Leone Protectorate ===
No.	Portrait	Name (Birth–Death)	Election	Term of office			Political party
No.	Portrait	Name (Birth–Death)	Election	Took office	Left office	Time in office	Political party
1		Sir Milton Margai (1895–1964)	—	14 August 1958	27 April 1961	2 years, 256 days	SLPP

=== Prime ministers of Sierra Leone ===
Sierra Leone was granted independence by the Sierra Leone Independence Act 1961 and became a free state with Queen Elizabeth II as its head of state. In 1971, Sierra Leone became a republic with Siaka Stevens as executive president.

No.	Portrait	Name (Birth–Death)	Election	Term of office			Political party
No.	Portrait	Name (Birth–Death)	Election	Took office	Left office	Time in office	Political party
1		Sir Milton Margai (1895–1964)	1962	27 April 1961	28 April 1964^{[†]}	3 years, 1 day	SLPP
2		Sir Albert Margai (1910–1980)	—	28 April 1964	21 March 1967	2 years, 327 days	SLPP
3		Siaka Stevens (1905–1988)	1967	21 March 1967 (Deposed in a coup)		Several minutes	APC

=== Military rule (1967–1968) ===
The NRC was a group of senior military officers who took power in 1967 removing Siaka Stevens from the office of prime minister and ruled the nation from 1967 to 1968. The NRC was overthrown in April 1968 by a group of military officers who reinstated Stevens as Prime Minister.

No.	Portrait	Name (Birth–Death)	Term of office			Political party
No.	Portrait	Name (Birth–Death)	Took office	Left office	Time in office	Political party
		Brigadier David Lansana (1922–1975)	21 March 1967	23 March 1967 (Deposed in a coup)	2 days	Military
		Commissioner Leslie William Leigh (1921–1980); Chairman of the NRC	23 March 1967	28 March 1967	5 days	Military
		Brigadier Andrew Juxon-Smith (1931–1996); Chairman of the NRC	28 March 1967	18 April 1968 (Deposed in a coup)	1 year, 21 days	Military
		Brigadier John Amadu Bangura (1930–1970); Chairman of the NIC and of the ACRM	18 April 1968	22 April 1968	4 days	Military

=== Prime ministers of Sierra Leone ===
Siaka Stevens was reinstated by a group of military officers who overthrew NRC. In 1971, Stevens abolished the monarchy and he made Sierra Leone a republic with himself as an executive president.

No.	Portrait	Name (Birth–Death)	Election	Term of office			Political party
No.	Portrait	Name (Birth–Death)	Election	Took office	Left office	Time in office	Political party
(3)		Siaka Stevens (1905–1988)	—	26 April 1968	21 April 1971	2 years, 360 days	APC
4		Sorie Ibrahim Koroma (1927–1994)	1973	21 April 1971	8 July 1975	4 years, 78 days	APC
5		Christian Alusine Kamara-Taylor (1917–1985)	1977	8 July 1975	15 June 1978	2 years, 342 days	APC

=== Chief ministers of Sierra Leone ===
From 2018 to present, Sierra Leone has operated under a presidential system, whereby the Chief Minister is not the head of government, but mainly existed in a capacity of assisting the President.

No.	Portrait	Name (Birth–Death)	Election	Term of office			Political party
No.	Portrait	Name (Birth–Death)	Election	Took office	Left office	Time in office	Political party
6		David J. Francis (born 1965)	2018	8 May 2018	30 April 2021	2 years, 357 days	SLPP
7		Jacob Jusu Saffa (born 19??)	—	30 April 2021	10 July 2023	2 years, 71 days	SLPP
8		David Moinina Sengeh (born 1986)	2023	10 July 2023	Incumbent	3 years, 59 days	Independent

== See also ==
- List of colonial governors of Sierra Leone
- President of Sierra Leone
- List of heads of state of Sierra Leone
