= Tinga Seisay =

Sierra Leonean diplomat and pro-democracy activist

The Honourable Tinga Seisay

Sierra Leone Consul General to the United States
- In office 1968–1974
- Monarch: Elizabeth II
- Prime Minister: Siaka Probyn Stevens
- Vice PM: Sorie Ibrahim Koroma
- Preceded by: David Lansana
- Succeeded by: C.O. Bright

Deputy Commissioner Sierra Leone Police Force
- In office 1967–1968
- Monarch: Elizabeth II
- President: Siaka Probyn Stevens
- Vice President: Sorie Ibrahim Koroma
- Succeeded by: James Bambay Kamara

Personal details
- Born: Tinga Khendhaka Seisay; August 22, 1928 Mokorewoh, Moyamba, British Sierra Leone
- Died: February 4, 2015 (aged 86) Freetown, Sierra Leone
- Resting place: Freetown, Sierra Leone
- Relatives: Solomon G. Seisay; John Amadu Bangura; Ella Koblo Gulama; Hindolo Trye
- Education: St. Edward's Secondary School; Police Training School
- Alma mater: Royal Institute of Technology B.A. Long Island University M.Sc.
- Occupation: Civil Engineer
- Profession: Diplomat
- Committees: United Nations General Assembly

Samuel Tinga Khendekha Seisay (22 August 1928 – 4 February 2015) was a Sierra Leonean diplomat and pro-democracy activist.

== Early life ==
Born to a prominent political family, Seisay was educated at St. Edward's Secondary School. After graduating from the Police Training School at Hastings, he began his career as a law enforcement officer.

After several years with the Sierra Leone Police Force, Seisay traveled to Europe to continue his studies where he studied engineering at the Royal Institute of Technology in Sweden. While he was a student, Seisay had a life-changing meeting with Martin Luther King Jr. in Stockholm, which deepened his interest in nonviolent activism.

Seisay earned a master's degree in political science at Long Island University. He is a Ph.D. candidate at The New School in New York City.

== Diplomatic career ==
In 1967, Seisay founded the Sierra Leone Ex-Police Officers Association.

He was elected as their representative to the Civilian Rule Committee, that was going to restore civilian rule in Sierra after the military government of Andrew Juxon-Smith. In 1968, Juxon Smith's government was overthrown in the Sergeants' Coup. Seisay was then appointed Deputy Commissioner of the Sierra Leonean Police Force by the ruling junta. Seisay proved to be most efficient in this post, especially considering the difficult political climate, and skillfully helped manage the transition.

Seisay was initially tapped to serve as Sierra Leone's Ambassador to Egypt but was instead appointed Consul General to the United States. He was stationed in New York where he served for six years. He worked to secure educational scholarships for Sierra Leonean students in various fields, primarily education.

Under his leadership, the Sierra Leone Consulate became financially self-sufficient. Seisay also served as Dean of the Consular Corps.

He sat on the Fifth Committee of the United Nations General Assembly for several years.

== Fight for democracy ==
After Steven's state was declared a one-party state, Seisay's cousin John Amadu Bangura staged an unsuccessful military coup. Bangura was later executed for treason. Seisay became an opponent of the Stevens government. He left his post as Consul General and began to protest the decline of democracy in Sierra Leone. He publicly criticized Stevens' regime in The New York Times.

== Political exile ==
In 1974, Seisay went into self-imposed political exile. Among his allies were his older brother Solomon G. Seisay, director of prisons, and former Prime Minister Albert Margai until Margai's death in 1980. Seisay aided Sierra Leoneans who fled from persecution to get political asylum in the United States. In 1987, Seisay's political exile ended when Joseph Saidu Momoh became president of Sierra Leone.

== Later career and private life ==
Seisay became an executive in the private sector. Based in the United States, he continued to work internationally and remained devoted to the cause of re-establishing democracy in Sierra Leone. In the early 1960s, he married a member of the Swedish aristocracy and they raised their family in Westchester County, New York.

He has lectured at several universities, including Dartmouth, and published a number of articles and op-eds most notably in West Africa and Christian Science Monitor.
