= Patrick Conteh =

Sierra Leonean politician and military leader

Patrick Conteh was a Sierra Leonian military leader and politician.

In 1968, together with John Amadu Bangura, he participated in the Sergeants' Coup. Conteh took over with his Anti-Corruption Revolutionary Movement (ACRM) on 18 April 1968 as chairman of the National Interim Council and ended a long period of coups. He sat himself as Prime Minister on the 19 April and handed over power on 22 April 1968, when a civilian government under Banja Tejan-Sie as Governor General and Siaka Probyn Stevens as Prime Minister was established.
