= Sierra Leone presidents and head of state by tribes =

Below is a list of Sierra Leone prime ministers, presidents, heads of state and their tribes:

Leader	Ethnic group	Religion	in office
Julius Maada Wonie Bio (President)	Sherbro	Christianity	April 4, 2018 – present
Ernest Bai Koroma (President)	Temne	Christianity	September 17, 2007 – April 3, 2018
Ahmad Tejan Kabbah (Note: Currently the first and only Muslim Head of State of Sierra Leone) (President)	Mandingo	Islam	March 29, 1996 - March 10, 1998 March 10, 1998 - September 17, 2007
Johnny Paul Koroma (Military junta)	Limba	Christianity	May 25, 1997 – February 6, 1998
Julius Maada Bio (Military junta)	Sherbro	Christianity	January 16, 1996 – March 29, 1996
Valentine Strasser (Military junta)	Krio	Christianity	April 29, 1992 – January 16, 1996
Joseph Saidu Momoh (President)	Limba	Christianity	November 28, 1985 – April 29, 1992
Siaka Probyn Stevens	Limba	Christianity	April 26, 1967 - April 26, 1967 (Prime Minister) April 22, 1968 - November 28, 1985 (Prime Minister later President)
Christopher Okoro Cole (Note: Served as Governor-general and President of Sierra Leone for 1 day in 1971.) (Governor-general and President)	Krio	Christianity	April 19, 1971 – April 21, 1971
John Amadu Bangura (Military junta)	Loko	Christianity	18 April 1968 - 22 April 1968.
Andrew Juxon-Smith (Military junta)	Krio	Christianity	March 27, 1967 - April 18, 1968
David Lansana (Military junta)	Mende	Christianity	March 23, 1967 - March 25, 1967
Sir Albert Margai (Prime Minister)	Mende	Christianity	April 28, 1964 – March 21, 1967
Sir Milton Margai (Note: First Prime minister of independent Sierra Leone) (Prime Minister)	Mende	Christianity	April 27, 1961 – April 28, 1964
