= Sierra Leonean coup d'état =

Sierra Leonean coup d'état may refer to:

- 1992 Sierra Leonean coup d'état
- 1996 Sierra Leonean coup d'état
- Sergeants' Coup (Sierra Leone)
- 1967 Sierra Leonean coups d'état
