= 1967 Sierra Leonean general election =

General elections were held in Sierra Leone on 17 March 1967. They were won by the opposition All People's Congress, marking the first time that a ruling party had lost an election in sub-Saharan Africa (excluding white-ruled South Africa and Southern Rhodesia). However, the APC was overthrown in a military coup hours after taking power. The party was later restored to office after a counter-coup the following year and established a long-standing dictatorship.

== Background ==
Although the Sierra Leone People's Party had won the previous elections in 1962, it had become increasingly unpopular, in part due to Albert Margai's unsuccessful attempts to convert the country into a one-party state, accusations of corruption, and an attempt to prevent opposition parties running against him and three other SLPP candidates.

There was also an ethnic dimension to the elections; the SLPP tended to be supported by the Mende, Sherbro and Fula, whilst the APC was more popular amongst the Temne, Susu, Loko, Mandinka and Creoles. Antagonism towards the SLPP had grown due to the Margai's promotion of several Mendes to prominent positions with the country's civil service and the fact that the group were beginning to dominate the country's army.

== Results ==
Party	Votes	%	Seats	+/–
All People's Congress	279,715	44.92	32	+16
Sierra Leone People's Party	230,999	37.10	28	0
Independents	111,936	17.98	6	–8
Paramount chiefs			12	0
Total	622,650	100.00	78	+4
Source: Nohlen et al.

== Aftermath ==
Governor-General Henry Josiah Lightfoot Boston swore in APC leader Siaka Stevens as the country's new Prime Minister on 21 March. Hours later, Stevens was overthrown in a coup led by David Lansana. The army put both Stevens and Boston under house arrest on the grounds that any change of government should have awaited the election of the tribal representatives to the House of Representatives. Lansana was then removed from power on 23 March by a group led Andrew Juxon-Smith which named themselves the National Reformation Council. They suspended the constitution and placed Margai under arrest.

On 18 April 1968 a "sergeants' revolt" was carried out by the Anti-Corruption Revolutionary Movement led by John Amadu Bangura. NRC members were imprisoned, and other army and police officers deposed. Stevens was allowed to assume the office of Prime Minister under the restored constitution.
