= Jengo Stevens =

Sierra Leonean politician

Jengo Stevens was a Sierra Leonean politician. He is the son of Siaka Stevens, who was President of Sierra Leone from 1971 to 1985, and he was a Member of Parliament representing Kambia District. He is a member of the ruling All People's Congress (APC).
