= 1967 Sierra Leonean coups d'état =

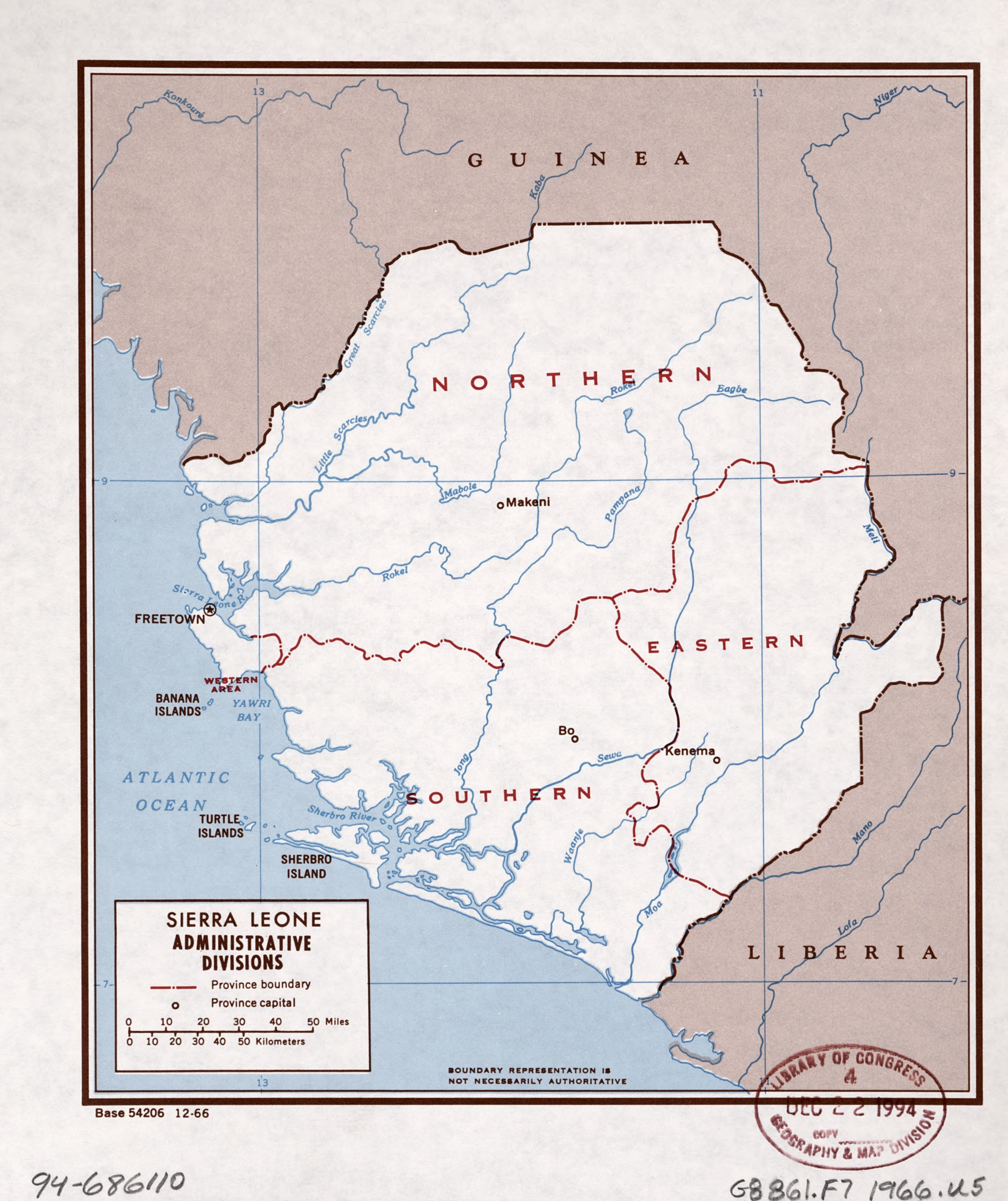
- Map of Sierra Leone in 1966
- Date: 21–23 March 1967
- Location: Sierra Leone
- Type: Military coup
- Cause: Election of Siaka Stevens
- Participants: First coup David Lansana; Second coup Officers linked to National Reformation Council
- Outcome: Successful coups: 1967 general election annulled; Arrests of Siaka Stevens and David Lansana; Counter-coup in 1968

The 1967 Sierra Leonean coups d'état were two successive coups in Sierra Leone that took place from March 21 to 23, 1967.

== Background ==
The Sierra Leone Colony and Protectorate gained independence from the United Kingdom in 1961 as a Commonwealth realm, and in subsequent years Sierra Leone was considered an exemplary post-colonial democratic state. However, this changed during the premiership of Albert Margai, who took office on April 29, 1964. Margai's government faced harsh criticism, being accused of corruption and favoritism towards the Mende tribe. Meanwhile, he also strove to convert Sierra Leone into a one-party state with his party, the Sierra Leone People's Party, holding that position.

For the 1967 general elections on March 17, he led a dirty campaign against opposition parties, refusing to allow opposition candidates to register if they challenged his party's nominees. Meanwhile, riots erupted due to widespread discontent, prompting the government to declare martial law.

However, Siaka Stevens, Margai's opponent and leader of the All People's Congress (APC), won a narrow majority in the Parliament of Sierra Leone. On March 21, although official results had not yet been announced, Governor-General Henry Josiah Lightfoot Boston summoned Stevens and swore him in as the nation's prime minister.

== Events ==
=== March 21 coup ===
The coup occurred after Stevens' inauguration ceremony, before the election results were officially announced. Army Commander David Lansana ordered the extrajudicial arrest of Stevens and the Governor-General, overseen by officer Samuel Hinga Norman. After the arrests, Lansana took control of the Government House and national radio and television channels. Then, he annulled the election results, declared martial law and assumed the position of Head of State. The next day, March 22, Lansana made a second radio broadcast reiterating his martial law declaration. Lansana's goal was reportedly to restore Margai to power.

=== March 23 coup ===
Lansana's decision to seize power was unpopular among his fellow Mende officers, who believed the army should not be involved in domestic politics. Before the coup, Lansana's influence among his subordinates was undermined by allegations of drunkenness and womanizing.

Just two days later, on March 23, 1967, a group of dissenting military officers staged a counter-coup: They arrested Lansana and Margai, imprisoning them alongside Lightfoot Boston and Stevens. Once the country's most powerful politicians were neutralized, the coup leaders established a military junta called the National Reformation Council (NRC), composed of eight members, led by Major Charles Blake and Lieutenant Colonel Ambrose Patrick Genda, the latter being the deputy commander of the Army dismissed by Mangai in 1966.

Genda declared that the coup's objective was "to restore Sierra Leone's fragile democracy, if possible". The coup plotters asked Lieutenant Colonel Andrew Juxon-Smith, from the Creole community, who was abroad during the coup, to return and lead the new government. Leslie William Leigh was appointed interim President of the National Reformation Council (NCR) and Governor-General, until Andrew Juxon-Smith returned to Sierra Leone on March 28 and assumed both roles.

== Consequences ==
The NRC regime extended until the following year, as on April 18, 1968, Brigadier John Amadu Bangura led a new coup d'état against Juxon-Smith's dictatorship. With the sole objective of restoring democracy, he assumed interim head of state before returning power to Stevens. The 1968 coup paved the way for the establishment of Stevens' autocratic regime. After Stevens declared a one-party state in 1971, Bangura organized another military coup, this time unsuccessfully. Bangura was subsequently executed for treason.

Stevens would remain as Prime Minister until 1971, when he became President of Sierra Leone, a position he held until 1985. Meanwhile, the All People's Congress ruled as Sierra Leone's sole legal party for 23 years (1978–1991), following the 1978 constitutional referendum, a fraudulent election where 97% supported a one-party system.
