= Banja Tejan-Sie =

Governor General of Sierra Leone (1917–2000)

Sir Banja Tejan Sie GCMG

Governor-General of Sierra Leone
- In office 22 April 1968 – 21 March 1971
- Monarch: Elizabeth II
- Prime Minister: Siaka Stevens
- Preceded by: Henry Josiah Lightfoot Boston
- Succeeded by: Christopher Okoro Cole

Speaker of the House of Parliament of Sierra Leone
- In office 1962–1967
- Preceded by: Sir Henry Josiah Lightfoot Boston
- Succeeded by: Sir Emile Luke

Personal details
- Born: Banja Tejan-Sie; 7 August 1917 Moyamba, Moyamba District, British Sierra Leone
- Died: 8 August 2000 (aged 83)
- Party: Sierra Leone People's Party (SLPP)
- Spouse: Admire Stapleton
- Children: Daphne Tejan-Sie; Malcolm Tejan-Sie; Yomi Tejan-Sie; Sulaiman Tejan-Sie
- Education: Bo School: Bo, Sierra Leone; London School of Economics: London, England
- Profession: Attorney, Lawyer

Sir Banja Tejan-Sie GCMG (7 August 1917 – 8 August 2000) was the Governor General of Sierra Leone and one of the "founding fathers" of the Sierra Leone People's Party (SLPP). He was knighted by the Queen, with the most distinguished Order - The Grand Cross of the Order of St Michael and St George, GCMG. Tejan-Sie was born in Moyamba District (in the current Southern Province) to a famous Muslim cleric and scholar from the Fulah tribe. Tejan-Sie was educated at the Bo School and the Prince of Wales School before continuing his education at the London School of Economics and Lincoln's Inn, where he was called to the bar in 1951.

== Political career ==
In 1951, Tejan-Sie lost an election for a seat in the Parliament; despite this he was appointed as one of the two National Vice Presidents of the SLPP in 1953. However, in 1957, after losing his second election, Tejan-Sie began a career in the judiciary. In 1962, he was elected to the position made empty in the legislature of Speaker of the House by Sir Henry Josiah Lightfoot Boston, who became Governor-General of Sierra Leone.

In 1967, a military coup overthrew the government and set up the National Reformation Council. Tejan-Sie was appointed to the position of Chief Justice of the Supreme Court, which he held until 1968. In that same year, when civilian control was restored, he was appointed as Governor-General. In 1971, when Sierra Leone was declared a republic, Tejan-Sie went into exile in England, where lived for the rest of his life, although he visited Sierra Leone again in 1987 at the behest of President Joseph Saidu Momoh.

Government offices
| Preceded by John Amadu Bangura | Governor-General of Sierra Leone; 1968–1971 | Succeeded by Christopher Cole (acting) |
