= Constitution of Sierra Leone =

The Constitution of Sierra Leone is the supreme law governing Sierra Leone and delineates its frame of government. It entered into force on October 1, 1991, following a popular referendum and approval by President Joseph Momoh. It superseded the 1978 Constitution.

The new constitution allowed for multi-party elections which were scheduled for October 1992 and ended one-party rule for the All People's Congress (APC). The constitution was suspended after a military coup in April 1992. In 1996, the Constitution was reinstated and popular elections were held. An interregnum occurred between May 1997 and March 1998 when a coup d'état deposed the government.

The Constitution is divided into fourteen chapters. Sierra Leone is a constitutional republic with a directly elected president that serves as the head of state, head of government, and commander-in-chief of the armed forces. The president is elected for a term of five years for a maximum of two terms. Ministers of State and members of Sierra Leone's judiciary are appointed by the president and confirmed by the parliament through majority vote. Sierra Leone has a unicameral legislature and the constitution provides for an independent judiciary vested with the power of judicial review. The constitution offers specific protections of fundamental human rights, individual liberty and justice and places restrictions on the powers of government over the people. It can be amended through a bill of parliament that is subject to the approval of a referendum. The Constitution was last amended in 2016.

== Background ==
=== Constitutional Tutelage ===
Sierra Leone's constitutional development originated from a British understanding of government. Originally a settlement for freed slaves, control of Sierra Leone was granted by charter to the Sierra Leone Company. Thus, the first form of government for Sierra Leone was company rule.

Sierra Leone was proclaimed a Crown Colony in 1808. The Governor was appointed by the Crown, and he was empowered to appoint members to the Advisory Council which consisted of the colonial secretary, the chief justice, and one "unofficial" member chosen by the Governor from among the inhabitants of the colony. In 1863 the Advisory Council was reconstituted as a Legislative Council and an Executive Council was also created. The Executive Council was composed of members appointed by the Governor, and the Legislative Council only consisted of a small minority of high status Sierra Leoneans nominated by the government. The goal of this institutional change was to provide for more efficient management of the colony and was not an attempt to prepare Sierra Leone for self-government.

In 1893 the colonial authorities allowed for the election of a municipal council in Freetown.

In 1895 the Crown acquired jurisdiction over adjoining territories to the Colony and proclaimed them to be a British Protectorate. While the Colony and the Protectorate remained legally heterogeneous until 1924, the Crown was able to legislate in a concurrent fashion over the two proximate territories. The 1924 constitution extended the jurisdiction of the Legislative Council and Executive Council to include the protectorate. In effect, this motivated the legal understanding for a united Sierra Leone. The Legislative Council also allowed unofficial members to be elected to it.

In 1951 a new constitution was declared for Sierra Leone by the governor, George Beresford-Stooke. A major step toward self-governance, an "unofficial" majority in the Legislative Council was introduced along with a corresponding decrease in the number of seats allocated for high-status members. Two years later, the Legislative Council was enlarged to 30 members of which 14 members were elected to represent the Protectorate. The Executive Council was also reorganized to require the Governor to appoint at least 4 members to the council from among the elected members of the Legislative Council. Some of these members of the Executive Council, including Milton Margai, were accorded ministerial oversight over various sectors of government.

More constitutional changes came in 1956 which widened the franchise for legislative elections. Women who met certain literacy and economic qualifications were allowed to vote and secret ballots were introduced. Elections were scheduled for early 1957 and the Legislative Council was to be replaced by a House of Representatives with 58 seats. The Executive Council was reformed in 1958 to include the appointment of a Premier who had support from a majority in the House of Representatives. On advice from the Premier, the Governor was required to appoint and allocate responsibilities to the Ministers. Milton Margai was appointed to that role.

=== Constitution of 1961 ===
In London between April and May 1960, Milton Margai led a delegation from Sierra Leone to arrange independence from Britain and discuss how this new government would be structured. An agreement was reached that Sierra Leone would gain its independence on April 27, 1961, and join the Commonwealth of Nations. Fundamental human rights provisions were entrenched in the constitution and Sierra Leone inherited a Westminster model of parliamentary democracy. As a Commonwealth state, Queen Elizabeth II would remain Sierra Leone's head of state and the prime minister would be the effective head of government.

=== Constitution of 1971 and 1978 amendment ===
Following the series of military coups between 1967 and 1968, Siaka Stevens was reinstated as Prime Minister of Sierra Leone, a position he was originally elected for in 1967. In the wake of this period of political instability and economic problems, Stevens set up a Constitutional Review Commission in June 1969. At the time, Sierra Leone was alone among Commonwealth African States in remaining a Dominion with the Queen as a formal Head of State. During this period of review, whether Sierra Leone would adopt an executive or ceremonial presidency was under question and opposition groups were concerned that Stevens was aiming for an executive presidency which would make him unaccountable to the Cabinet.

A group of soldiers attempted to assassinate Stevens on March 23, 1971. Facing potential coup attempts, Stevens arranged for Guinean troops to protect the government. In April, a republican Constitution was introduced without need for a general election by implementing Albert Margai's earlier draft. The constitution was then promptly amended to create an executive presidency, which Stevens assumed.

In 1977 student demonstrations took place across the country and an election was called. During the election, Stevens utilized his "Internal Security Unit" to intimated and persecute opponents of his APC party. On occasion these confrontations devolved into violence. Expectedly, Stevens' party won 65 of the 80 seats in parliament. A constitutional amendment was introduced and passed by referendum in 1978 to turn Sierra Leone into a one-party state. Stevens would remain the President of Sierra Leone until handing over power to Joseph Momoh on November 28, 1985, in a staged election.

== History ==
In 1990 the United Nations Development Program released its first Human Development Report and ranked Sierra Leone the fourth lowest in terms of its Human Development Index. A year later, Sierra Leone would occupy the absolute lowest position. Externally, the post-Cold War landscape was having an effect on politics. The government was facing pressures to democratize as the United States and the IMF insisted that financial assistance be tethered to evidence of democratization. Sierra Leone was in an extreme period of economic decline, social disintegration, and political corruption. In the face of these problems, at the 1990 conference of the Sierra Leone Bar Association members voted unanimously for a return to multi-party democracy, citing one-party rule as a source of national disunity, mistrust, poverty, and corruption. Student groups increasingly appealed for a return to multi-party elections.

In September 1990, President Momoh convened a Constitutional Review Commission which ultimately recommend for the drafting of a new constitution that would restore multiparty politics. Accepting the commission's report which included a draft constitution, President Momoh took steps to get the new constitution through Parliament. During the proceedings, a bicameral legislature was proposed, but rejected by the government. Voters approved the new constitution in a referendum in August 1991.

The constitution, however, was relatively short-lived. The Sierra Leone Civil War had begun and Mohmoh's government found itself vulnerable to internal challenges. In April 1992, a cadre of junior military officers, calling themselves the National Provisional Ruling Council, overthrew Momoh's government and suspended the constitution by declaration. In 1996 power was transferred back to civilian rule, the constitution was reinstated, and Ahmad Kabbah was elected as president in March 1996. In March 1997, another military coup occurred and Kabbah was ousted from power. Less than a year later, Nigerian-led ECOMOG forces drove the junta out of Freetown, reinstating the constitution and Kabbah as president. Since then, the Constitution has been in full effect.

Aside from ending one-party rule, the constitution also made other alterations from the 1978 constitution. The new constitution makes serious commitments to personal liberty, democracy, and fundamental human rights, contains provisions that do not allow for political organizations structured around ethnic, tribal or religious affiliations, and creates greater separations between the three main branches of government. The new constitution created an office of Ombudsman which helps to protect individuals against administrative wrongs and abuses of governmental power.

== External Liniks ==
- "Constitution Of Sierra Leone". www.parliament.gov.sl.
