= Ambrose Patrick Genda =

Sierra Leonean politician (1927–2002)

Ambrose Patrick Genda (20 April 1927 – 2002) was a Sierra Leonean politician.

== Biography ==
Genda was born 20 April 1927, in Gerihun. In March 1967, he led a coup d'état. He was the state leader for three days as chairman of the National Reform Council before he had to hand over power to Andrew Terence Juxon-Smith.

He then became ambassador to Liberia before going to the United Kingdom for a year as High Commissioner from 1968. He was the ambassador to the Soviet Union until 1970.

He died in 2002.
