= Sergeants' Coup (Sierra Leone) =

Violent overthrow in Sierra Leone

Date	18 April 1968; 58 years ago
Location	Sierra Leone
Result	Coup successful: the All People's Congress rules Sierra Leone for 24 years.

Belligerents
Republic of Sierra Leone Armed Forces	(Sierra Leone) National Reformation Council

Commanders and leaders
(Sierra Leone) John Amadu Bangura	(Sierra Leone) Andrew Juxon-Smith

The Sergeants' Coup was a military coup d'état in Sierra Leone that occurred on 18 April 1968 against Chairman of the National Reformation Council (NRC) and acting Governor-General of Sierra Leone Brigadier Andrew Juxon-Smith, who declared himself the interim leader the year prior. The coup was led by Brigadier John Amadu Bangura who briefly ruled as head of state before handing power over to Siaka Stevens, who had won the 1967 general election. Despite Bangura's desire to restore democracy by upholding the results of the election, the coup opened the way for the autocratic rule of Stevens, including the 23-year-long period from 1978-1991 where the All People's Congress was the only legal party in Sierra Leone following the 1978 Sierra Leonean constitutional referendum, a sham election where 97% of the population voted in favor of one-party rule. Despite returning Stevens to power, Bangura was later executed for treason.

== Background ==
In the general election of March 1967, Siaka Stevens' All People's Congress party won a plurality of parliamentary seats, defeating the Sierra Leone People’s Party (SLPP). Before taking office however, Stevens was arrested by Brigadier General David Lansana who demanded that tribal representatives be elected as well. The NRC eventually ousted Lansana and placed the government under permanent military rule.

== The coup ==
The coup plotters were soldiers in the Republic of Sierra Leone Armed Forces who were dissatisfied with their low wages and poor conditions. They were part of the Anti-Corruption Revolutionary Movement (ACRM), who were led by Brigadier John Amadu Bangura, who served as Chief of the Defence Staff following the coup. Bangura took issue with the government collapsing after a series of coups that followed the hotly contested elections of March 1967.

The sergeants first formed in the town of Darn and then moved to the capital of Freetown. The ACRM imprisoned senior NRC members and arrested all high-ranking officers in the army and the police. Bangura, briefly served as head of state from 18 April to 22 April 1968. At least 12 people were killed as a result of the coup. On his last day in office, he gave the post of Prime Minister to Siaka Stevens after his predecessor Sir Henry Lightfoot Boston had declared the All People's Congress the winners of the election. At the same time, the Constitution of Sierra Leone was restored. After Stevens declared a one-party state, Bangura staged another military coup, but it was unsuccessful. Bangura was later executed for treason. His cousin Tinga Seisay later became an active opponent of the Stevens government and a pro-democracy activist. It is largely seen as an example of a coup failing to accomplish its stated objectives by empowering a later autocratic government.

== See also ==
- List of coups and coup attempts
- List of coups and coup attempts by country
- 1992 Sierra Leonean coup d'état
