= Christopher Okoro Cole =

Sierra Leonean politician

Christopher Elnathan Okoro Cole CMG OBE

Acting President of Sierra Leone
- In office 19 April 1971 – 21 April 1971
- Vice President: Sorie Ibrahim Koroma
- Preceded by: post established
- Succeeded by: Siaka Stevens

Acting Governor-General of Sierra Leone
- In office 31 March 1971 – 19 April 1971
- Monarch: Elizabeth II
- Prime Minister: Siaka Stevens
- Preceded by: Sir Banja Tejan-Sie
- Succeeded by: post abolished

Chief Justice of Sierra Leone
- In office 1970–1978
- Preceded by: Banja Tejan-Sie
- Succeeded by: Eben Livesey Luke

Personal details
- Born: 17 April 1921 Waterloo, British Sierra Leone
- Died: 1990 (aged 68–69)
- Children: 4

Christopher Elnathan Okoro Cole, CMG OBE (April 17, 1921 – 1990) was a Sierra Leonean politician. He served as Governor-general and President of Sierra Leone for 1 day in 1971. Cole was appointed officer of the Most Excellent Order of the British Empire (OBE) in 1965 for "Public services as minister without portfolio" and inducted as a companion of the Order of St Michael and St George in 1973.

== Early life ==
Cole was born to Creole parents at Waterloo, Sierra Leone, then a British colony. He studied at Seventh Day Adventist School Waterloo, Buxton Memorial School, Freetown, C.M. S.G.S. He attended London School of Economics and London University. He graduated LLB. In 1946 Cole entered the Bar at The Middle Temple. From 1946–1951 he worked in private practice in Sierra Leone. From 1947–1951 he served as part-time lecturer in law. Department of Economic Studies, F.B.C.

== Career ==
He worked as the City Solicitor.; Police Supreme Courts 1952. Commissioner of Oaths. Crown Counsel until 1956 when he was promoted to Solicitor General.

In 1957-1968 he served as Chancellor, Diocese of Sierra Leone. In 1960-1961 he served as chair of the Cole Commission to inquire into Sierra Leone's national accounts.

He represented Sierra Leone at "The Future of Law in Africa" Conference. In 1960 he was appointed a Judge of the Supreme Court of Sierra Leone. In 1962 he served as Justice of Appeal, Court of Appeal of the Gambia. Acted as Chief Justice of the Gambia.

In 1963 he represented Sierra Leone at the "World Peace through Law Conference". In 1965 he represented Sierra Leone at the Commonwealth and Empire Law Conference. In 1963 he repeatedly acted as C.J. of Sierra Leone. In 1965 he was awarded the O.B.E.

In 1967 he was appointed Ambassador to the US and as Permanent Representative at the United Nations. In 1968 he headed Sierra Leone's Delegation to Conference of Plenipotentiaries on the Law of Treaties held in Vienna

In 1969 he served as Chairman, Judicial Service Commission, Chairman, Rules of Court Committee, Vice Chairman for Africa of the World Association of Judges.

In 1970 he became Chief Justice of Sierra Leone. In June 1970 he was awarded the C.M.G.

At this time there was a complicated process of constitutional change after the Sierra Leonean monarchy was abandoned in early 1971. It was determined that Siaka Stevens, Prime Minister at that time, would become the President. Cole, who had been appointed interim Governor-General on March 31, served for two days as the acting president. Thereafter, he reverted to his earlier post of Chief Justice of Sierra Leone until 1978.

He was Sierra Leone's first United Nations Permanent Representative in New York and a member of the Lancaster delegation that signed the independence document from Great Britain on 21 December 1979.

== Personal life ==
He retired from Public Service in 1978. He was married with four children.

Government offices
Preceded by Sir Banja Tejan-Sie	Governor-General of Sierra Leone; 1971	Succeeded by Position abolished
Political offices
Preceded by Elizabeth II as Queen of Sierra Leone	Acting President of Sierra Leone; 1971	Succeeded by Siaka Stevens
