= Christian Alusine Kamara-Taylor =

Sierra Leonean politician

5th Prime Minister of Sierra Leone
- In office July 8, 1975 – June 15, 1978
- Preceded by: Sorie Ibrahim Koroma
- Succeeded by: position abolished

Personal details
- Born: June 3, 1917 Kafanta, Tonko Limba Chiefdom, Kambia District, British Sierra Leone
- Died: August 15, 1985 (aged 68) Freetown, Sierra Leone
- Party: All People's Congress (APC),

Christian Alusine Kamara-Taylor (June 3, 1917 – August 15, 1985), popularly known as C.A., was a Sierra Leonean politician and one of the founding members of the All People's Congress (APC), along with Siaka Stevens and Sorie Ibrahim Koroma. He served as Minister of Finance of Sierra Leone from 1971 to 1975. He became Prime Minister and Minister of Interior in 1975. After the introduction of a one-party constitution in 1978, Kamara-Taylor became the Second Vice-President of Sierra Leone, and held that post until his death in 1985.

== Early life ==
Kamara-Taylor was born on June 3, 1917, in the small rural town of Kafanta, Tonko Limba Chiefdom, Kambia District, in the Northern Province of British Sierra Leone, to Limba parents. He attended the local primary school in Kambia. He then studied at the Methodist Boys' High School in Freetown and later at the London School of Accountancy, which awarded him a diploma in business methods.

On his return to Sierra Leone, he worked as a clerk for the Sierra Leone Development Company. He then enlisted in the Sierra Leone Regiment, reached the rank of sergeant and served in Burma during World War II. After leaving the army at the end of the war, he joined the United African Company, where he was public relations officer and secretary to the general manager.

== Politics ==
Kamara-Taylor became active in local politics and was a founding member of the APC, serving as the party's first secretary-general for more than fifteen years. He entered parliament in 1957. At the 1962 general election he won the Kambia East seat, which he held again in 1967. After the return to civilian rule in 1968, he was appointed Minister of Lands, Mines and Labour, and in a cabinet reshuffle in 1971 he became Minister of Finance. In 1975 he was made Prime Minister and Minister of Interior. After a one-party constitution was introduced in 1978, he became Second Vice-President, a post he held until his death in 1985.

Political offices
Preceded by Sorie Ibrahim Koroma	Prime Minister of Sierra Leone; 1975–1978	Succeeded by David J. Francis (as Chief Minister)
