= 1985 Sierra Leonean presidential election =

- 1 October 1985
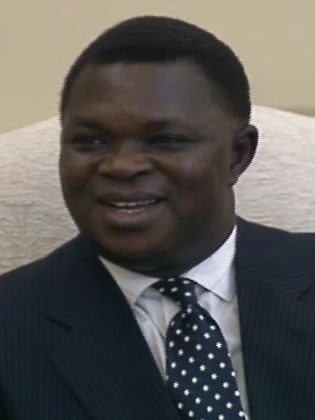
Nominee	Joseph Saidu Momoh
Party	APC
Popular vote	2,780,495
Percentage	99.85%
President before election
Siaka Stevens
APC
Elected President
Joseph Saidu Momoh
APC

A referendum to confirm Joseph Saidu Momoh as president of Sierra Leone was held on 1 October 1985. It was the country's first direct vote for president. At the time, the country was a one-party state with the All People's Congress as the only legal party.

Momoh was named as the APC's presidential candidate after retiring president Siaka Stevens persuaded several other hopefuls to stand down. Voters only had the option of approving or rejecting his candidacy. According to official results, 99.85% of voters confirmed Momoh in office, with just over 4,000 people voting no.

== Results ==
Candidate	Party	Votes	%
Joseph Saidu Momoh	All People's Congress	2,780,495	99.85
Against		4,096	0.15
Total		2,784,591	100.00
Source: African Elections Database
