= Sorie Ibrahim Koroma =

Sierra Leonean politician

The Right Honourable Sorie Ibrahim Koroma
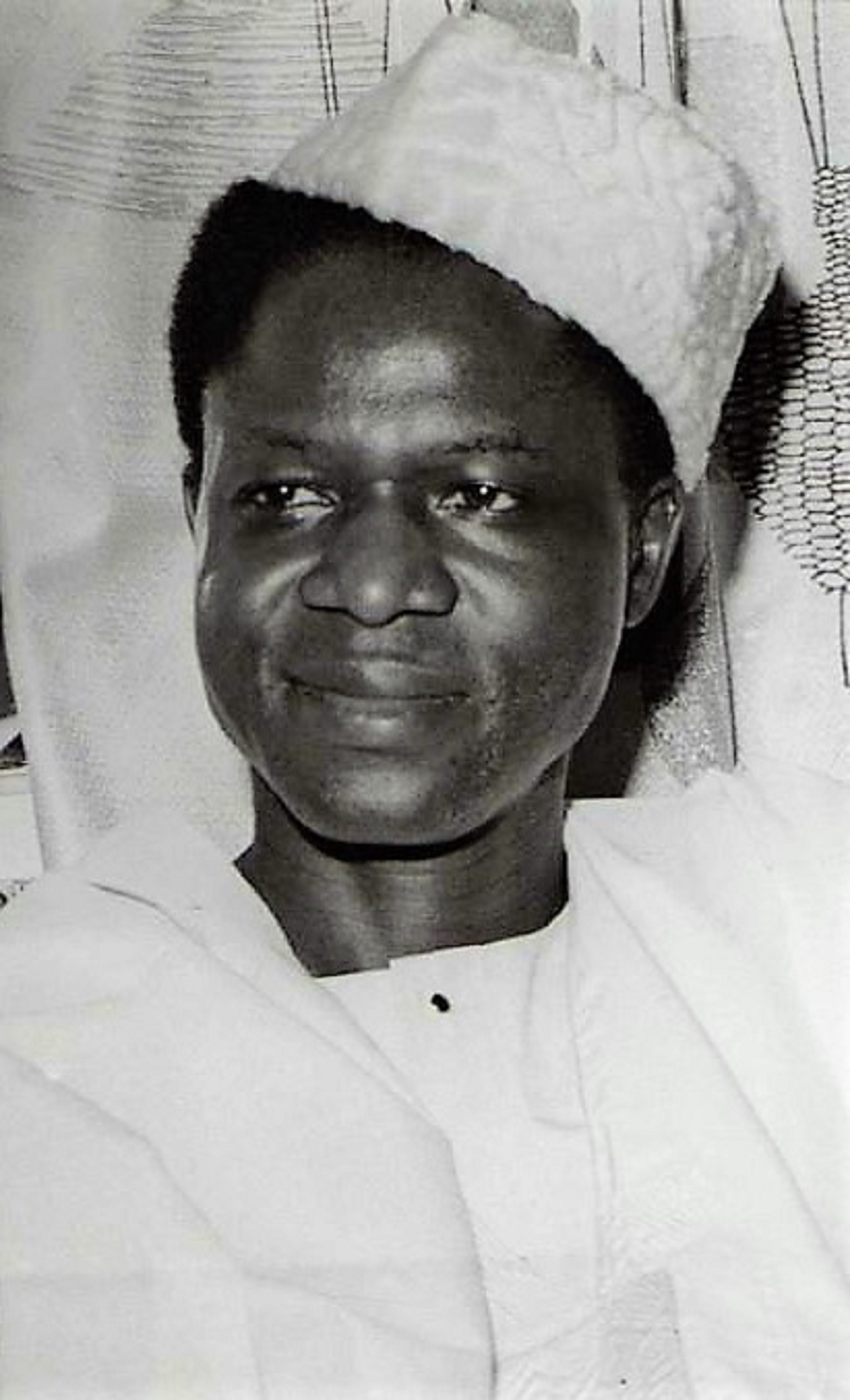

1st Vice President of Sierra Leone
- In office April 19, 1971 – November 28, 1985
- President: Siaka Stevens
- Preceded by: None
- Succeeded by: Francis Minah

4th Prime Minister of Sierra Leone
- In office April 21, 1971 – July 8, 1975
- Preceded by: Siaka Stevens
- Succeeded by: Christian Alusine Kamara-Taylor

Minister of Trade and Industry
- In office 1967–1969

Sierra Leone Minister of Agriculture and Natural Resources
- In office 1969–1971

Member of Parliament of Sierra Leone from the Western Area Urban District
- In office 1960–1967

Personal details
- Born: April 14, 1927 Port Loko, Port Loko District, British Sierra Leone
- Died: April 30, 1994 (aged 67) Freetown, Sierra Leone
- Party: All People's Congress (APC)
- Profession: Petroleum Engineer
- Religion: Islam

Sorie Ibrahim Koroma (April 14, 1927 – April 30, 1994) commonly known as S.I. Koroma was a Sierra Leonean politician, labor activist, and one of the founding members of the All People's Congress political party. He served as first Vice President of Sierra Leone from April 19, 1971, to retirement on November 28, 1985, under president Siaka Stevens.

Sorie Ibrahim Koroma was a close personal friend of President Siaka Stevens and was one of the closest and most trusted political advisors to President Stevens. To date, within Sierra Leonean society, S.I. Koroma is widely considered the most influential vice president in Sierra Leone's history.

== Early years ==
One of Sierra Leone’s most vibrant political figures, Sorie Ibrahim Koroma was born in Port Loko, Maforki Chiefdom, Port Loko District in the Northern province of British Sierra Leone. He was one of the 13TH members of the APC after it was formed on March 20, 1960. Sorie Ibrahim Koroma's father was a member of the Mandingo ethnic group of Guinean descent, and he died when Koroma was just a little boy. After the death of his father, his mother, Ya Iye Wureh, married an ethnic Temne chief named Bai Bockarie Dumbuya, the nephew of Alikali Mela (who was then Paramount Chief of Port Loko District).

Koroma was raised in the Dumbuya family household instead of the Koroma family compound at Sendugu Chief, Port Loko District, an area dominated by ethnic Mandingo and Susu. Though raised in a Temne home, SI Koroma never forgot his Mandingo heritage and he was also fluent in the Mandingo language.

Alikali Mela made his nephew Bockari Dumbuya a sub-chief, conferring him the title “Or Sultan.” Alikali Mela also crowned SI’s mother a chief, giving her the title of “Ya Alimamy.” That was how Sorie Ibrahim Koroma, the only child to his mother, became a member of two important ruling families in Port Loko – the Bangura and Dumbuya families.

== Education ==
SI Koroma was educated at the Government Model Primary School in Freetown and received his secondary education at the Bo School in Bo. He went to Bo school at a time when it was an institution exclusively for individuals belonging to ruling families in the provinces.

After completing his secondary education, S I Koroma, who had a fierce determination to succeed in life, landed a job with the Sierra Leone Government Co-operative Department. He worked there from 1951 to 1958 and took a course during that period at the Cooperative College, Ibadan, Nigeria. On his return home, he resigned from Government Service to set up his own private business. He fared well in the transportation business and within a short time became Secretary General of the Sierra Leone Motor Transport Union.

== Formation of the APC and Parliament ==
In 1960, he was a member of the All People's Congress (APC), which has since been one of the premier political parties in the country. In 1962, Koroma was elected as a Member of Parliament to the Parliament of Sierra Leone representing a district of Freetown, to which he was re-elected in the 1967 election

== Cabinet positions ==
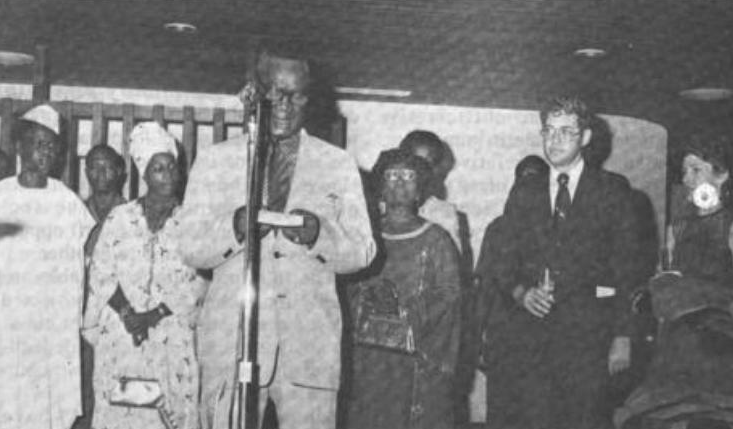
Koroma and his wife Mabinty Koroma (far left) at a reception with President Siaka Stevens delivering a speech, 1976

After the 1967 coup d'état by David Lansana and the return to civilian control in 1968, Koroma became the Minister of Trade and Industry in Siaka Stevens' first cabinet. From 1968 until 1985, Koroma served various functions in the government, including Minister of Agriculture and Natural Resources (1969–1971), Vice-President (1971–1985) and Prime Minister (1971–1975), Minister of Finance (1975–1978). He would continue in that position until 1978 when he was appointed First Vice-President after the APC declared itself the only legal party. Koroma was the First Vice President until he retired from politics. He went to care more directly for his palm oil plantation near his birthplace in Port Loko.

Political offices
Preceded by Position created	First Vice President of Sierra Leone; 1971–1985	Succeeded by Francis Minah
Preceded by Siaka Stevens	Prime Minister of Sierra Leone; 1971–1975	Succeeded by Christian Alusine Kamara-Taylor
