= Andrew Juxon-Smith =

Creole politician and military officer (1931–1996)

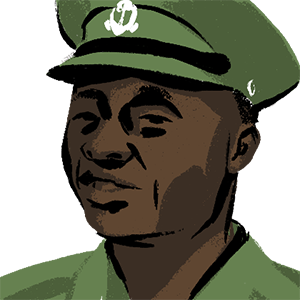
- An illustration of Juxon-Smith produced by Voice of America

Chairman of the National Reformation Council (Junta Chief)
- In office 28 March 1967 – 18 April 1968
- Preceded by: Leslie William Leigh (as Chairman of the National Reformation Council)
- Succeeded by: John Amadu Bangura (as Chairman of the NIC and of the ACRM)

Governor-General of Sierra Leone (Head of State)
- In office 28 March 1967 – 18 April 1968
- Monarch: Elizabeth II
- Preceded by: Henry Josiah Lightfoot Boston
- Succeeded by: John Amadu Bangura

Personal details
- Born: Andrew Terence Juxon-Smith; November 30, 1931 Freetown, Sierra Leone
- Died: 1996 Stapleton, New York, U.S.
- Education: Royal Military Academy Sandhurst

Military service
- Rank: Brigadier

Brigadier Andrew Terence Juxon-Smith (30 November 1931 – 1996) was a Sierra Leonean politician and military officer of Creole descent. Between 27 March 1967 and 18 April 1968, he was Chairman of the National Reformation Council and acting Governor-General, equivalent to head of the Sierra Leonean state. He was additionally Minister of Finance of Sierra Leone. He and the Council were overthrown in April 1968 by a group of low-level military officials led by John Amadu Bangura that restored Sierra Leone to rule by parliament under Siaka Stevens. He later moved to the United States and died in Stapleton, New York.

Juxon-Smith's life is the subject of the short documentary A Forgotten Past, directed by Andreas Hadjipateras in 2018.

== Policies ==
Juxon-Smith fought against tribalism during his rule. he implemented an austere IMF reform package and set up commissions of inquiry. He pursued economic policies of austerity and budgetary. He also raised taxes and import duties, closed down inefficient state plantations, fired the most venal politicians and turned the economy over to professional administrators. His policies brought considerable unemployment. He has declared war on corruption and promised to transform an economy brought to near-bankruptcy by Albert Margai's free-wheeling deficit spending. His short rule was seen as nepotist and also as authoritarian.

Government offices
Preceded by Henry Josiah Lightfoot Boston	Governor-General of Sierra Leone; 1967–1968	Succeeded by John Amadu Bangura (acting)
