= 1978 Sierra Leonean constitutional referendum =

12 July 1978

Results
Choice	Votes	%
Yes	2,152,460	97.15%
No	63,186	2.85%

A constitutional referendum was held in Sierra Leone on 12 July 1978. The constitutional amendments were aimed at turning the country into a presidential one-party state, with the All People's Congress as the sole legal party. The new constitution had been adopted by Parliament in May, and was put to public approval in the referendum. With more than 97% of voters voting in favour according to official results, the referendum has been described as "heavily rigged".

APC leader and President Siaka Stevens had pushed for the adoption of one-party rule, contending that it was more "African" than Western-style democracy.

== Results ==
Choice	Votes	%
For	2,152,460	97.15
Against	63,186	2.85
Total	2,215,646	100.00
Registered voters/turnout	2,235,004	–
Source: African Elections Database

== Aftermath ==
Following the referendum, Stevens was sworn in for another seven-year term. In the next presidential elections in 1985, voters had the choice of supporting or opposing his successor, Joseph Saidu Momoh, with no opposition candidates allowed. The 15 Sierra Leone People's Party MPs elected in 1977 joined the APC.

The country would remain a one-party state until 1991, when a referendum repealed the 1978 constitution and returned the country to multi-party politics.
