= National Reformation Council =

The National Reformation Council, or NRC, was a group of senior military officers with Brigadier Andrew Juxon-Smith as its chairman, who seized control of the Sierra Leone government on March 23, 1967. They suspended the constitution, arresting Brigadier David Lansana, Commander of the Armed Forces.

A few days previously, in a bloodless coup, Lansana had placed Siaka Stevens, the All People's Congress (APC) candidate and Mayor of Freetown, under house arrest and declared martial law; this had been done only hours after Siaka Stevens had been declared the new prime minister by Sierra Leone Governor General Henry Josiah Lightfoot Boston, following closely contested general elections. Lansana acted on the grounds that the determination of office should await the election of the tribal representatives to the house.

The NRC was overthrown in April 1968 by a group of military officers who called themselves the Anti-Corruption Revolutionary Movement (ACRM), led by Brigadier John Amadu Bangura. The ACRM imprisoned senior NRC members, restored the constitution and reinstated Stevens as Prime Minister.

== Book reference ==
- Keen, David (2005). Conflict and Collusion in Sierra Leone. Oxford: James Currey. ISBN 9780852558836.
