= Leslie William Leigh =

Sierra Leonean police officer (1921–1980)

Leslie William Leigh (23 February 1921 – 13 April 1980) was a Sierra Leonean police officer who served as the first African Commissioner of Police in Sierra Leone. Leigh was one of the few West Africans to enlist and serve in the Second World War as a bomber pilot in the British Royal Air Force.

== Background ==
Leslie William Leigh was born to Lt. Col. Thomas William Dupigny-Leigh, (1888-1968), and a mother from the Susu ethnic group. Thomas William "Dupi" Leigh was a paternal descendant of William Henry Leigh, an English slave trader and a maternal descendant of the Dupigny family of Freetown, Sierra Leone, originally of African and French-Dominican descent in Roseau, Dominica. Leigh was a first cousin of John Ernest Leigh, the former Sierra Leonean ambassador to the United States and the late Dr Evelyn Arthur Moffatt Leigh.

== Royal Air Force ==
Leigh attended St Anthony's Primary School and subsequent to completing his secondary school education at the Albert Academy, Leigh travelled to Britain and enlisted in the Royal Air Force. In August 1942, he was based at Scarborough with No. 17 Initial Training Wing. He trained in Canada and served as a bomber pilot during the war.

== Political career ==
William Leigh was appointed the first African Commissioner of Police following the independence of Sierra Leone on 27 April 1961.

== Death ==
William Leigh died of a heart attack in Monrovia, Liberia.

== Sources ==
- Makers of Modern Africa: Profiles in History
- Ivor Cummings, "Per ardua and Astra", West Africa, Issue 3284, (30 June 1980), pp. 1177–1178.
