= John Amadu Bangura =

Sierra Leonean politician

Brigadier John Amadu Bangura CBE
- Born: John Amadu Bangura; 8 March 1930; Kalangba, Karene Chiefdom, Bombali District, British Sierra Leone
- Died: 1971 (aged 40–41); Pademba Road Prison, Freetown, Sierra Leone
- Burial place: Kissy Road, Freetown, Sierra Leone
- Spouse: Jamila Bangura
- Children: 8
- Relatives: Solomon G. Seisay (cousin); Tinga Seisay (cousin)
- Military career
- Allegiance: Sierra Leone
- Service years: 1950–1970
- Rank: Brigadier General; Commander; Lieutenant-Colonel; Major; Captain
- Commands: First Battalion, Royal Sierra Leone Regiment; First Sierra Leone Contingent, Congo Operations of the United Nations Organization
- Awards: Commander, Order of the British Empire (Military Division) (C.B.E.)

Brigadier John Amadu Bangura, CBE (8 March 1930 – 1971) was a Sierra Leonean military officer who served as Chief of the Defence Staff of the Sierra Leone Armed Forces from 1968 to 1971. Prior to this in 1967, he served as the Sierra Leonean Ambassador to the United States.

He overthrew the National Reformation Council military junta, led by Andrew Juxon-Smith, in the Sergeants' Coup on 18 April 1968. He led Sierra Leone briefly before handing power to Siaka Stevens, who had won the 1967 Sierra Leonean general election and with whom he had been residing in exile with the support of Guinean president Ahmed Sékou Touré who was in support of returning Stevens to power.

Following Stevens' increasingly authoritarian rule, Bangura attempted a coup against him in 1971, but this time the coup was unsuccessful and he was executed shortly after being captured by the military. Stevens and the APC would go on to rule Sierra Leone as a one-party state until 1991 when multi-party politics was reintroduced.

== Early life ==
Bangura was born on 8 March 1930 at Kalangba, Karene Chiefdom, Bombali District, British Sierra Leone. He was educated at Binkolo and Rogbaneh American Wesleyan Mission Schools, and Koyeima and Bo Government Secondary Schools.

He left school in 1949 and joined the army in 1950. While in the ranks he served and attended courses in both Ghana and Nigeria. In one such course, the Platoon Commanders' course in Burma Camp, Teshie, Ghana, he graduated first in a group of sixteen warrant officers and senior non-commissioned officers.

Due to his achievements, he was sent to the Royal Military Academy at Sandhurst for officer cadet training and then in 1952 was sent on to Mons Officer Cadet School, Eaton Hall, England. On graduation in August 1954, he was commissioned as a second lieutenant.

After a successful Young Officers' Course at Hythe and Warminster, Bangura was posted on secondment to the British Army on the Rhine in West Germany. While on secondment, he was promoted to the rank of lieutenant.

Bangura returned to Sierra Leone in 1955 and was appointed commander of a Rifle Company's Platoon in the First Battalion, the Royal Sierra Leone Regiment. In 1958, he was promoted to the rank of captain. In 1962, he served with the First Sierra Leone Contingent on the Congo Operations of the United Nations Organization. On his return home that year he was promoted to the rank of major.

In 1964, Bangura became commanding officer of the First Battalion the Royal Sierra Leone Regiment, attaining the rank of lieutenant-colonel. These promotions were preceded or followed by several successful courses in various military training centers in the United Kingdom. One such course was the All Arms Division Course for substantive Majors in the British Army.

In 1966, Bangura was posted to attend the Joint Services Staff College (UK) (J.S.S.C.) in Latimer, Buckinghamshire, and became a fellow of the college. In the same year, he was promoted to the rank of full colonel.

After a period of successful military career, he was arrested and detained at Pademba Road Prisons prior to the March 1967 general elections by David Lansana under orders from Sir Albert Margai. He was, however, released in March that year by Brigadier Andrew Juxon-Smith and appointed counsellor and head of the chancery at the Sierra Leonean Embassy in Washington D.C.

While in the US, he was given orders by John Karefa-Smart to go to Guinea with Siaka Stevens to train in guerrilla techniques. He mysteriously disappeared from his post to become chairman of the National Interim Council (NIC) which brought back civilian rule after a successful takeover of power from the military junta, the National Reformation Council (NRC) in 1968. He became commander of the First Battalion of the Royal Sierra Leone Regiment, and of the Royal Sierra Leone Military Forces after this operation. On 1 May 1969, he was promoted to the rank of brigadier and honoured in the 1970 New Year Honours with the C.B.E. (Commander of the Order of the British Empire) (Military Division). Brigadier John Amadu Bangura's thorough military training and great experience made him what he was a rare soldier.

He was married and had eight children.

== Sergeants' Coup ==
On 18 April 1968, the Sergeants' Coup overthrew the National Reformation Council (NRC) military junta, led by Brigadier Andrew Juxon-Smith, which had seized power following Siaka Stevens winning the contested 1967 general election. Brigadier David Lansana had gained power initially on 21 March 1967, but was himself overthrown by Juxon-Smith just two days later.

A group led by Warrant Officer Patrick Conteh and Private Morlai Kamara imprisoned the NRC officers and formed the Anti-Corruption Revolutionary Movement (ACRM). Bangura was in exile in Guinea, after he was earlier jailed after allegations of plotting a coup in February 1967, prior to the election. Bangura had been released and was serving as Sierra Leonean Ambassador to the United States, but fled his diplomatic post to hide in Guinea with Stevens and the rest of the exiled APC in the aftermath of the election and coup. Guinean president Ahmed Sékou Touré enabled them to train guerillas to prepare to retake Sierra Leone.

After the Sergeants' Coup was successful, Bangura and Stevens returned from exile, with Bangura heading the new ACRM junta. Sir Henry Josiah Lightfoot Boston was invited to return as Governor-General, after being deposed and placed on 'leave' when he announced Stevens as the winner of the election. When he refused the offer, Justice Sir Banja Tejan-Sie was made Acting Governor General on 22 April. Bangura was head of government until 26 April, when Stevens was made Prime Minister when Tejan-Sie confirmed the results of the election.

== Attempted anti-Stevens coup and execution ==
On 24 March 1971, Bangura attempted a coup against Stevens, who was becoming increasingly authoritarian. There was a dawn gunfight outside Stevens' home, with Bangura transmitting a broadcast informing the population about the coup and warning against any outside interference with it. By the end of the day, the military had captured Bangura and put out another radio broadcast disavowing Bangura's actions. Leautenent Colonel Sam King said in the broadcast, "A large percentage of the members of the Sierra Leonean military forces wish to assure all and sundry that they dissociate themselves from the earlier action of the army commander", and that "we regard the present Government of Prime Minister Siaka Stevens as the legally constituted authority in the country." Bangura and three other senior officers were convicted of treason and executed shortly afterward. Stevens then signed a defense pact with Guinea, led by Ahmed Sékou Touré who had helped him and Bangura retake power in the Sergeants' Coup. Guinean troops arrived six days after the coup attempt, remaining in the country until 1973.

Stevens wrote in his 1984 autobiography What Life Has Taught Me,"I am fully aware that many people were shocked when these sentences were carried out and that even today, much speculation goes on as to what prompted me to allow the law to take its course. There is even a fantastic rumour circulating that I had actually decided to commute the sentences to terms of imprisonment but that certain strong party members had forced me to change my mind. Let me put the record straight here and now. No single person, nor even the demonstrations in favour of the death sentence that filed through the city, had any influence whatsoever on the action I was obliged to take. For me it was a dreadful act. I had to wrench myself out of my own character."
