= Henry Josiah Lightfoot Boston =

Sierra Leonean diplomat and politician

Sir Henry Josiah Lightfoot Boston GCMG

Governor-General of Sierra Leone
- In office 7 July 1962 – 26 March 1967
- Monarch: Elizabeth II
- Prime Minister: Milton Margai; Albert Margai
- Preceded by: Sir Maurice Henry Dorman
- Succeeded by: Andrew Juxon-Smith

Personal details
- Born: Henry Josiah Lightfoot Boston; 19 August 1898 Freetown, Sierra Leone
- Died: 14 December 1968 (aged 70) London, United Kingdom
- Spouse: Christiana Muriel Songo-Davies
- Education: Sierra Leone Grammar School; University College London; Lincoln's Inn
- Occupation: Governor-General of Sierra Leone, Speaker of Parliament, barrister

Sir Henry Josiah Lightfoot Boston, GCMG (19 August 1898 – 14 December 1969) was a Sierra Leonean diplomat and politician. He was the first Sierra Leonean Governor-General of Sierra Leone. He was a member of the Creole ethnic group (descendant of freed slaves from Nova Scotia, United States and Great Britain landed in Freetown between 1792 and 1855).

== Career ==
Lightfoot Boston served as Speaker of the Parliament of Sierra Leone from 1957 to 1962 and as Governor-General of Sierra Leone from 7 July 1962 to 26 March 1967. He was preceded by British diplomat Sir Maurice Henry Dorman and succeeded after a coup d'état by Brigadier Andrew Juxon-Smith.

== Legacy ==
Lightfoot Boston Street in Freetown is named in his honor.

Lightfoot Boston's image is featured on a 50 Leone coin issued by the Bank of Sierra Leone.

Government offices
Preceded by New office	Speaker of the House of Parliament of Sierra Leone; 1957–1962	Succeeded by Banja Tejan-Sie
Preceded by Sir Maurice Henry Dorman	Governor-General of Sierra Leone; 1962–1967	Succeeded by Andrew Juxon-Smith
