= Siaka Stevens =

Leader of Sierra Leone from 1967 to 1985

Siaka Probyn Stevens
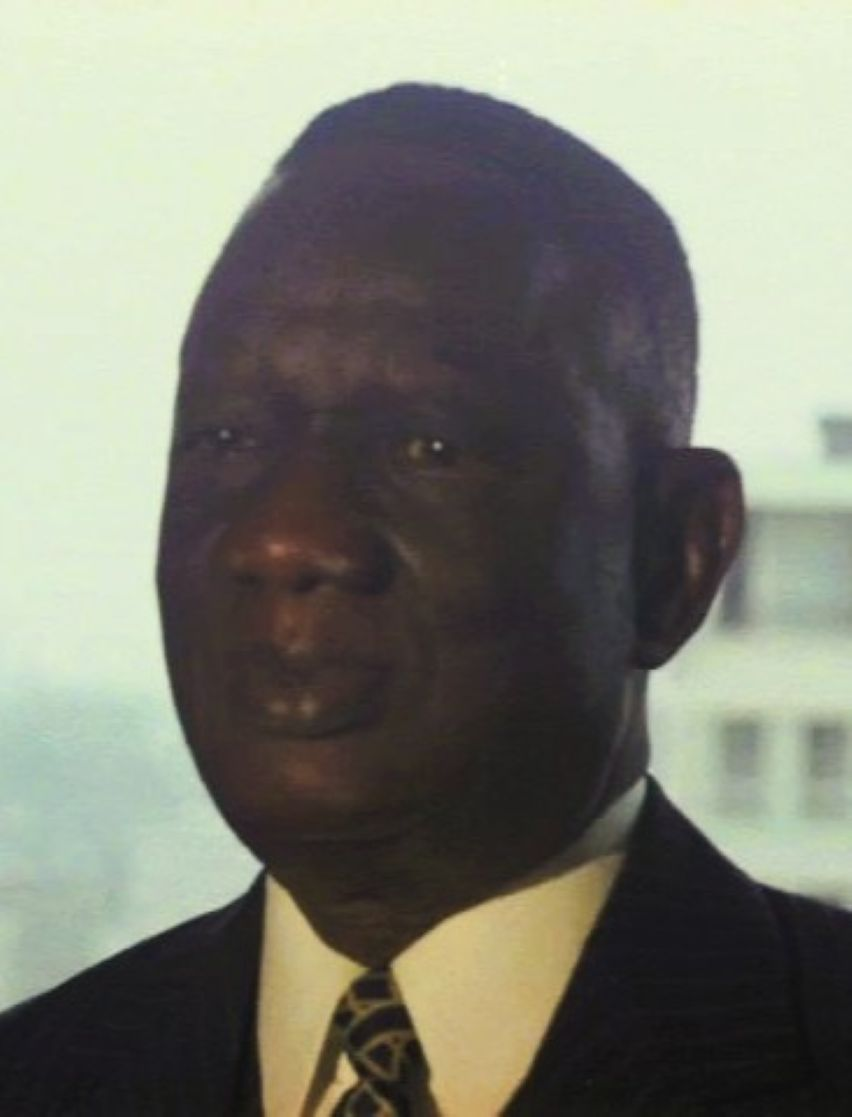
- Stevens in 1979

1st President of Sierra Leone
- In office 21 April 1971 – 28 November 1985
- Vice President: Sorie Ibrahim Koroma; Christian Alusine Kamara‑Taylor; Francis Minah
- Preceded by: Christopher Okoro Cole (acting)
- Succeeded by: Joseph Saidu Momoh

3rd Prime Minister of Sierra Leone
- In office 26 April 1968 – 21 April 1971
- Monarch: Elizabeth II
- Governors-General: Sir Banja Tejan-Sie; Christopher Okoro Cole
- Preceded by: Sir Albert Margai
- Succeeded by: Sorie Koroma

Leader of the All People's Congress
- In office 1962 – 28 November 1985
- Preceded by: Position established
- Succeeded by: Joseph Saidu Momoh

Mayor of Freetown
- In office May 1962 – 17 May 1966
- Succeeded by: Constance Cummings-John

Member of Parliament of Sierra Leone from Western Area Urban District
- In office 1958–1962

Member of Parliament of Sierra Leone from Port Loko District
- In office May 1957 – 1958

Sierra Leone Protectorate Minister of Mines, Lands and Labour
- In office 1951–1957

Personal details
- Born: Siaka Probyn Stevens; 24 August 1905 Moyamba, British Sierra Leone
- Died: 29 May 1988 (aged 82) Freetown, Sierra Leone
- Party: All People's Congress
- Spouse: Rebecca Stevens
- Education: Fourah Bay College; Ruskin College
- Profession: Trade unionist; police officer

Siaka Probyn Stevens (24 August 1905 – 29 May 1988) was the leader of Sierra Leone from 1967 to 1985, serving as Prime Minister from 1967 to 1971 and as President from 1971 to 1985. Stevens' leadership was often characterized by patrimonial rule, violence, and self-indulgence, consolidating power by means of corruption and exploitation.

Stevens and his All People's Congress (APC) party won the closely contested 1967 Sierra Leone general elections over incumbent Prime Minister Sir Albert Margai of the Sierra Leone People's Party (SLPP). In April 1971, Stevens made Sierra Leone a republic and became president a day after the constitution had been ratified by the Sierra Leone Parliament. Though generally considered as the first president of Sierra Leone, technically he was the second President of the Republic after Christopher Okoro Cole, a judge, who was sworn in for a day after which he resigned, paving the way for Stevens.

Stevens served as Chairman of the Organisation of African Unity (OAU) from 1 July 1980 to 24 June 1981, and pioneered the creation of the Mano River Union, a three-country economic union comprising Sierra Leone, Liberia, and Guinea.

Stevens retired from office at the end of his term on 28 November 1985. After pressuring all other potential successors to step aside, he chose Major-General Joseph Saidu Momoh, the commander of the Sierra Leone Armed Forces, as his successor. He died on 29 May 1988, in Freetown. He was seen as a "Pragmatic Socialist"

== Early life ==
Siaka Probyn Stevens was born on 24 August 1905 in Moyamba, Moyamba District in the Southern Province of British Sierra Leone to a Limba father and a Mende mother. His maternal mother Miatta Massaquoi is the daughter of Siaka Massaquoi who was a king of the Vai people (also: Gallinas), whose settlement area is now partly in Sierra Leone and partly in Liberia . He is considered the founder of the modern ruling house of the Massaquoi and the kingdom of the Gallinas (1814), which was the only one in Africa to have a crown designed after the European model.

Although born in Moyamba, Stevens was largely raised in Freetown. Stevens completed his primary education in Freetown and completed secondary school at Albert Academy in Freetown, before joining the Sierra Leone Police Force. From 1923 to 1930, he rose to the rank of First Class Sergeant and Musketry Instructor.

From 1931 to 1946, Stevens worked on the construction of the Sierra Leone Development Company (DELCO) railway, linking the Port of Pepel with the iron ore mines at Marampa. In 1943, he helped co-founded the United Mine Workers Union and was appointed to the Protectorate Assembly in 1946 to represent worker interests. In 1947, Stevens was enrolled at Ruskin College where he studied labour relations.

== Political career ==
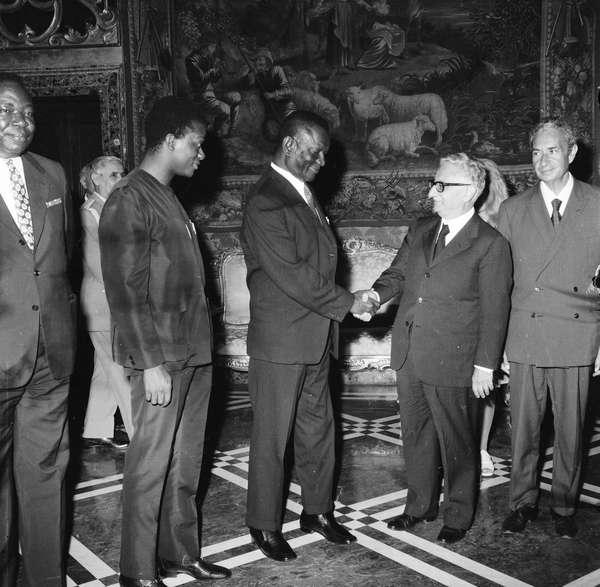
Stevens in 1973 with Italian President Giovanni Leone and Prime Minister Aldo Moro

In 1951, Stevens co-founded the Sierra Leone People's Party (SLPP) and was elected to the Legislative Council. A year later, he became Sierra Leone's first Minister of Mines, Lands, and Labor. In 1957, he was elected to the House of Representatives as a member for Port Loko constituency, but lost his seat as a result of an election petition. The APC was founded in 1963–64 when during Stevens's visit to East Germany, with Sheku Magona and Kade Kamara, Kamara later went to China to seek seed funding for the start of the party.

After disagreements with the SLPP leadership, Stevens broke ties with the party and co-founded the People's National Party (PNP), of which he was the first secretary-general and deputy leader. In 1959, he participated in independence talks in London. When the talks concluded, however, he was the only delegate who refused to sign the agreement on the grounds that there had been a secret defence pact between Sierra Leone and the United Kingdom. Another point of contention was the Sierra Leonean government's position that there would be no elections held before independence, which would effectively shut him out of the political process. He was promptly expelled from the PNP upon his return from the talks. Stevens then launched the Elections Before Independence Movement (EBIM).

After successfully exploiting the disenchantment of northern and eastern ethnic groups with the SLPP, along with the creation of an alliance with the Sierra Leone Progressive Independence Movement (SLPIM), He was one of the eight member's of the APC after it was formed on 20 March 1960.

== Interrupted premiership ==
The All People's Congress is one of the two major political parties in Sierra Leone, the other being the Sierra Leone People's Party (SLPP). The party was founded in 1960 by a breakaway group from the Sierra Leone People's Party who vehemently opposed the idea of an election before independence, but instead supported the idea of independence before elections. The All People's Congress (APC) was formed at 5 Elba Street, Freetown, and it consisted of the late Alhaji Chief Mucktarru Kallay, the party's first chairman and Leader and who gave the name and the symbol. Allieu Badarr Koroma, the deputy chairman, C.A. Kamara-Taylor, First Secretary General, Alhaji Sheik Gibril Sesay, Treasurer, Kawusu Konte, Organiser, S. A. T. Koroma, Public Relations, Kotor AbuBakarr Sam Bangura, The Artist who drew the Symbol, were the first seventh and later added six to thirteen members. These were the first seven and founders members of the All Peoples Congress. The next Members are Siaka Probyn Stevens, Nancy Steele, S.I.Koroma, Bob Allen, Mohamed Bash-Taqui and Ibrahim Bash-Taqui. Sir Albert Margai who would later return to the SLPP and become prime minister, and Siaka P. Stevens, who would also later become prime minister and subsequently President of Sierra Leone. The APC governed the country from 1968 to 1992, and became the ruling party again in 2007, after the party presidential candidate Ernest Bai Koroma won the 2007 Sierra Leonean presidential election.

In elections held on 17 March 1967, the APC won by an extremely narrow margin, and Stevens was appointed prime minister, but he was arrested only half an hour after taking office during a military coup led by Brigadier David Lansana.

After a brief period of military rule, Stevens reassumed the post of prime minister on 26 April 1968. In April 1971, a republican constitution was introduced. It was ratified by the House of Representatives on 20 April. Due to the complex process of ending the monarchy, Chief Justice Christopher Okoro Cole became interim governor general in late March. When the republic was formally inaugurated on 19 April, Cole became president for two days. He then resigned, and Stevens became president, with wide executive and legislative powers.

== Presidency ==
In 1973, the first elections under the new constitution were held. The polls were marred by violence and were boycotted by the SLPP, which gave the APC all 85 seats in the House of Representatives. In March 1976 Stevens was re-elected President unopposed by the House. Stevens's first vice-president from 1971 until leaving office in 1985 was Sorie Ibrahim Koroma.

Throughout the remainder of the 1970s, Stevens continued to consolidate his power, which culminated in a 1978 referendum on a new constitution that would create a one-party state with the APC as the only legally permitted party. Stevens billed the proposed one-party system as more African than Western-style democracy. However, the country had been a de facto one-party state since Sierra Leone became a republic. On 12 June, 97.1% of voters were reported to have voted for the new one-party constitution, an implausibly high total that could have only been obtained by massive fraud. Observers agreed that the elections had been heavily manipulated by the government. Proving this, even areas where the SLPP was still dominant were reported as supporting the one-party state by landslide margins.

Following the election, all opposition members of the House of Representatives were required to join Stevens's APC or lose their seats. Two years after being re-elected for a five-year term, Stevens was sworn in for an additional term of seven years, having by then adopted the title of "Dr." He also became known as "Pa Shaki".

President Stevens served as Chairman of the Organisation of African Unity (OAU) from 1 July 1980 to 24 June 1981, and engineered the creation of the Mano River Union, a three country economic federation of Sierra Leone, Liberia and Guinea. Stevens held additional office of Minister of Finance from December 1981 to early 1982.

Stevens' regime was very repressive and corrupt, even by African standards of the time. Many of his opponents, some of which were once close associates, were imprisoned and killed. The Internal Security Unit, a gang of unemployed urban youths amply supplied with drugs, was deployed as Stevens' personal death squad. He had actually shown a deep authoritarian streak long before making Sierra Leone an official one-party state; the late 1960s and early 1970s saw frequent states of emergency and numerous executions of political foes.

Among his close associates sent to the gallows were John Amadu Bangura, who had once plucked Stevens from political oblivion when the army obliterated civilian politics after the 1967 Huha elections; at that time, Stevens had been down and out, living in exile in Conakry, Guinea, with his main remaining option, a planned assault on the sovereignty of Sierra Leone and her citizens. Bangura was to be the ring leader, but the plan never materialised because of a coup headed by Bangura. Bangura, in turn, handed over power to Siaka Stevens as prime minister (Kpana:2005).

Another prominent Sierre Leonean murdered during Stevens' rule was Dr Mohamed Forna. He was hanged along with 14 other people in 1974 after trumped-up charges of treason. Dr Forna was the popular finance minister when Stevens came to power.

Stevens also grossly mismanaged the economy. He and his closest colleagues looted state resources, to the point that the state was unable to supply basic services. The education system was more or less non-existent. The poverty was especially pronounced in rural areas, which were largely isolated from Freetown. Although he had retired by the time of the Sierra Leone Civil War in 1991, the impact of his political, social, and economic policies directly contributed to that conflict.

=== Foreign policy ===
Siaka Stevens reached out to communist countries such as North Korea, Cuba and China upon taking office. This led western leaders to initially be wary of him. However, he was also a committed Anglophile, who believed that "old friends were the best." As a result of this, he took a staunchly pro-British approach to numerous foreign policy issues, including voting with Britain at the UN with regards to positions on Spain's claim to Gibraltar and on issues regarding Northern Ireland. Stevens stated that Spain had no legitimate claim to Gibraltar and he had Sierra Leone's delegation to the United Nations vote accordingly. Stevens oversaw Sierra Leone's transition from a constitutional monarchy with Queen Elizabeth II as the Queen of Sierra Leone, to a republican form of government with no monarchy. However, he was "outspokenly pro-British" the entire time, and was not motivated by any form of animosity towards Great Britain or the royal family. Despite forming ties with communist nations that were opposed to NATO and the west, Stevens said that outside of Africa, the United Kingdom would remain Sierra Leone's best and truest friend. He said he was proud of Britain's role in Sierra Leone's history which he believed was mostly positive. He outlined "football, rugby, cricket, boxing, trial by jury, habeas corpus and parliamentary democracy" as all being things Sierra Leone inherited from Britain that he was fond of. Stevens also said he was proud of having attended Ruskin College. His middle name was "Probyn" after the British governor Leslie Probyn, who governed Sierra Leone from 1904 to 1910. He said "the injustices and racialism of the colonial regime in Sierra Leone helped to make me an African nationalist. I do not say this in any spirit of hostility to the British I knew in the old days, many of whom I admired, even loved. They were doing a difficult job which they had chosen as a nation but not in every case as individuals. They were locked into a system of values and prejudices they had acquired from backgrounds and circumstances, which were an inescapable part of history. I apportion no blame."

Aside from that, Stevens also had very close relations with Guinea, in particular President Ahmad Sékou Touré, stemming from his time in exile there. Sierra Leone offered diplomatic support during a Portuguese attack on Conakry. Touré would even propose the unification of the two countries in June 1970; this did not happen, but Guinea and Sierra Leone did announce a mutual defense agreement in December 1970. This agreement was invoked in the wake of the failed 1971 coup against him, after which a small Guinean contingent arrived in Sierra Leone in order to guard Stevens; this arrangement would last into 1974.

== Retirement ==
Stevens retired from office at the end of his term on 28 November 1985. After pressuring all other potential successors to step aside, Major-General Joseph Saidu Momoh was sworn in as the new president of the Republic. Stevens died on 29 May 1988 in Freetown.

Partly due to Stevens' authoritarian excesses, Sierra Leone's current constitution limits the president to two five-year terms, even if they are nonsuccessive.

== See also ==
- Jengo Stevens

Political offices
Preceded by Albert Margai	Prime Minister of Sierra Leone; 1968–1971	Succeeded by Sorie Ibrahim Koroma
Preceded by Christopher Cole	President of Sierra Leone; 1971–1985	Succeeded by Joseph Saidu Momoh
