= Lapwing (ship) =

Several vessels have been named Lapwing, after the northern lapwing, a species of bird:

- Lapwing (1787 sloop) traded between London and Africa for the St George's Bay Company. Later she became a packet and coaster.
- Lapwing (1794 ship) was launched at Bristol and lengthened in 1797. She was a West Indiaman until in 1801 she became a slave ship. However, on her first slave trading voyage a Spanish privateer captured her. Although the Spanish authorities ordered her restitution to her owners, it is not clear that the order was anything but moot.
- Lapwing (1808 ship), a 2-masted wooden cutter (although registered as a ketch in the 1852 Custom House Register) built in 1808 in Mevagissey, Cornwall; wrecked off Port Elliot, South Australia, 5 September 1856
- SS Lapwing (1920 ship), of 1,348 GRT, was launched in 1920 at Paisley, Renfrewshire. On 26 September 1941 she was straggling from Convoy HG 73 when U-203 torpedoed and sank her in the Atlantic Ocean north north west of the Azores (47°40′N 23°28′W); 24 of her 34 crew were lost.

== See also ==
- HMS Lapwing – any one of eight vessels of the British Royal Navy
- Lapwing (EIC packet ship) – any one of three packets that served the British East India Company
