= Bai Koblo Pathbana II =

- 43rd Paramount Chief of Marampa
- Predecessor: Bai Koblo Gbamatti II
- Successor: Alie Koblo Queen Kabia II
- Born: 22 September 1912; Marampa, Masimera Chiefdom, Sierra Leone
- Died: 24 March 1998 (aged 85); Marampa, Masimera Chiefdom, Port Loko District, Sierra Leone
- Burial: Marampa, Masimera Chiefdom, Sierra Leone
- Spouse: Paramount Chief Madam Ella Koblo Gulama, Hajah Yabome Koblo, and 14 more wives.
- Issue: Francis Obai Kabia; [Soccoh Kabia; [Jilo Kabia; Richard Kenneth Kabia; Isatu Kabia-Mustapha; Samuel Kabia; Annie Kabia; Ann Kabia; Edward Kabia; Desmond Kabia; Princess Kabia; Frank Kabia; Michel Kabia; Michael Kabia; Amelia Kabia; Linda Kabia-Kamara; Feno-Feno Kabia; Marina Kakay; Donald Kabia; Anita Kabia; Francis Fayombo Kabia; Madonna Kabia; Edna Kabia; Jacqueline Kabia; Joseph Kabia; Ali Kabia; Foday Kabia; Marion Kabia; Victoria Kabia; Christine Kabia; Hector Kabia; Victor Kabia; Christiana Kabia; Rosemarie Kabia; Juliet Kabia-Daramy; Therasa Kabia-Kamara; Jenny Kabia; Bai Bai Kabia; Fanny Kabia; Elizabeth Baby Kabia; Linda Kabia (Kosna); Alberta Kabia; Didi Kabia; Denis Kabia; Eddie Kabia; Helen Kabia; David Kabia; Shaku Kabia; Aminata Kabia
- House: Pathbana
- Religion: Catholic

Bai Koblo Pathbana II, CBE was a paramount chief and politician in Lunsar, Port Loko District, Sierra Leone. He was crowned the 43rd Paramount Chief of Marampa-Masimera Chiefdom in 1943.

In 1946, he married Ella Gulama, the daughter of Julius Gulama, Paramount Chief of Kaiyamba District and ruler of the largest Mende chiefdom in Sierra Leone. Their marriage was a significant cross-tribal union marriage between an ethnic Temne and an ethnic Mende, the two most powerful clans in Sierra Leone.

Pathbana became a Cabinet Minister without Portfolio in the All People's Congress government led by Siaka Stevens in 1967. The post had been held by his wife Ella in the previous administration of Sir Albert Margai.

He was awarded a Member of the Order of the British Empire MBE and Commander of the Order of the British Empire (CBE)in the 1969 New Year Honours.

== Marriage and family ==
On 27 April 1946, he married Ella Gulama in a grand ceremony in Moyamba. Dr. Milton Margai spoke at the reception.

At the time of their marriage Ella was a 25-year-old graduate of the teachers' training college in Freetown. As she was both well educated and well travelled, Pathbana allowed her to accompany him to official functions. As his Chief Consort, she created education opportunities for women and girls in the Masimera Chiefdom and became a popular figure.

Together they had seven children but only three, Francis Obai Kabia, Soccoh Kabia, and Jilo Kabia, survived into adulthood. After several years, his wife returned to Moyamba, the seat of her father's chiefdom. She never returned to Pathbana and explained that she was unhappy in the marriage.

It is customary for Paramount Chief's in Sierra Leone practice polygamy, with their first spouse being a so-called "big wife" while the term "junior wife" is used to refer to their other spouses. In addition to his marriage to Ella, Pathbana was married to 16 other women and had a great number children with them.

== See also ==
- Obai
- Paramount Chief Ella Koblo Gulama, OBE, GCOR
- Soccoh Kabia
- Francis Obai Kabia
- Brigadier David Lansana
- Komeh Gulama Lansana
