= Lapwing (1787 sloop) =

History

Great Britain
- Owner: Granville Sharp
- Launched: 1787, Malden?
- Fate: Last listed 1804

General characteristics
- Tons burthen: 34, or 84 (bm)
- Sail plan: Sloop

Lapwing was a sloop launched in 1787, that in 1790 traded between London and Africa. She then disappeared from Lloyd's Register between 1793 and 1798. She reappeared in 1799 as a Bristol coaster and was last listed in 1804.

== Origins ==
Lloyd's Register gave her master as Williams and her owner as "G. Sharpe".

Granville Sharp acquired Lapwing to facilitate the work of the St George's Bay Company in providing a safe haven for destitute Africans in Sierra Leone and elsewhere.

The broker for the company purchased Lapwing for £186 on 12 February 1790 at the Customs House. Lapwing herself was in the "condemned hold", a location in Wapping, London where ships seized for smuggling were held before Customs disposed of them. (Note: The usual practice was for Customs to sell seized vessels, with half the proceeds going to the seizing officer and half to His Majesty's Treasury.)

== The Lapwing Expedition ==
Lapwing set sail for Sierra Leone in late 1790 carrying relief supplies for the settlers there. She was at Bance Island when the enslaving ship Duke of Buccleugh arrived in June 1791 carrying as passengers Dr. Alexander Falconbridge, his wife Anna Maria, and brother William, of the Clapham Sect and the Anti-Slavery Society, who had come out with the intent of reorganising the failed settlement of freed slaves in Granville Town, Sierra Leone.

On the return journey in 1791 Lapwing brought back the Falconbridges and carried the Temne prince John Naimbanna to London. During his stay in London, Naimbanna became friends with Henry Thornton and Granville, and when Naimbanna converted to Christianity he adopted the forenames Henry and Granville in their honour.

== Later career ==
Lapwing disappeared from Lloyd's Register between 1793 and 1798. However, a guide to the Isle of Man for 1797-8 reported that Lapwing, Cubbon, master, carried passengers from Liverpool to Douglas, Isle of Man, and that she had seven beds and a large stateroom. It goes on to say, "this once belonged to T. Whalley, Esq.; M.P." She was one of two vessels that carried the mails and passengers as well as a cargo, and usually made the trip in under 24 hours. Lapwing reappeared in 1799 with W. Cubbon, master, J.J. Bacon, owner, place of building Malden, and trade Bristol - Martinique. That entry remained unchanged through the Lloyd's Register for 1804. The Register of Shipping for 1804 gave her master as Cubbins, her owner as J. Bacon, and her trade Bristol coaster.
