= Lapwing (disambiguation) =

A lapwing is a medium-sized wading bird belonging to the family Charadriidae.

Lapwing may also refer to:

- Lapwing class minesweeper, a mine warfare class
- Lapwing Publications, a publisher based in Belfast
- USS Lapwing (AM-1), a Lapwing-class minesweeper
- USS Lapwing (AMS-48), a YMS-1-class minesweeper
- HMS Lapwing, one of a number of Royal Navy ships named after the bird
- Lapwing (1787 sloop) - a sloop that Granville Sharp purchased in 1790 for the support of a colony of free blacks he tried to establish in Sierra Leone
- Lapwing (EIC packet ship) - three vessels served the British East India Company as packet ships between 1743 and 1773
