= Kabia (surname) =

Kabia is a surname. Notable people with the surname include:

- Alie Koblo Queen Kabia II, Sierra Leonean paramount chief
- Francis Obai Kabia, Sierra Leonean politician who served as the Operations Officer for the UN Department of Peacekeeping Operations
- Ibrahim Kabia (born 1986), Sierra Leonean sprinter
- Jason Kabia (born 1969), English footballer
- Jim Kabia (born 1954), English footballer
- Mohamed Kabia (born 1988), Sierra Leonean footballer
- Soccoh Kabia, Sierra Leonean politician and physician who served as the Minister of Health
