= Julius Gulama =

Julis Momoh Gulama
- King of Kaiyamba kingdom now Chiefdom, Moyamba District
- Reign: 1928–1951
- Predecessor: King Momoh Gulama
- Successor: Ella Koblo Gulama
- Born: 1893; Moyamba, British Sierra Leone
- Died: 8 March 1951 (aged 57–58); Moyamba, Sierra Leone
- Burial: Moyamba, Sierra Leone
- Spouse: Madam Lucy
- Issue: Samuel, Ella, Komeh; Messie, Yebu
- House: Gulama
- Father: King Momoh Gulama
- Mother: King Consort Talla Gulama

Julius Momoh Gulama (born Julius Foday Cole, 1893 – 8 March 1951) was a Sierra Leonean King, statesman and educator in the pre-independence era. As King of Kaiyamba Chiefdom, he ruled the largest and most powerful Mende chiefdom in the Sierra Leone.

Gulama was a founding member of two key organizations that worked towards independence for Sierra Leone: the Protectorate Educational Progressive Union (PEPU) and the Sierra Leone Organizational Society (SOS). When Sierra Leone became independent, both organizations merged to form the Sierra Leone People's Party (SLPP).

He was the father of Ella Koblo Gulama and Komeh Gulama Lansana.

== Early life and education ==
He was born Julius Foday Cole in Moyamba, Moyamba District in the Southern Province of British Sierra Leone to Mende Paramount Chief Momoh Gulama of Kaiyamba Chiefdom and Talla, his Temne wife.

He received his primary school education at the EUB School at Rotifunk and graduated secondary school at Albert Academy in Freetown.

== Heir presumptive ==
It was understood in Moyamba that he would one day succeed his father Momoh Gulama as paramount chief.

Prior to his reign, he taught at Harford School for Girls in Moyamba. He also worked as a ticket master for the Sierra Leone Railway Department and was a clerk in the Kamerun campaign during World War I and a clerk at the Peterson Zochonis firm in Moyamba.

== Reign ==
His reign as paramount chief of Kaiyamba Chiefdom began in 1928. He assumed the regnal name "Julius Momoh Gulama".

Gulama is regarded as one of the Founding Fathers and Mothers of Sierra Leone.

=== The Sierra Leone Organization Society ===
Gulama was a founding member of the Sierra Leone Organization Society (SOS), a political association formed with the aim of achieving independence for Sierra Leone. The association consisted of a group of educated protectorate Sierra Leoneans including John Karefa-Smart, Siaka Stevens, J.D.Manley and Doyle Sumner.

=== Sierra Leone People's Party ===
In 1951, the Sierra Leone Organization Society (SOS) united with the Protectorate Educational Progressive Union (PEPU) to form the Sierra Leone People's Party (SLPP). Gulama was a founding member of the new political party.

It was chaired by Sir Milton Margai and the deputy leader was Chief Bai Farima Tass II.

== Public perception and character ==
Gulama is regarded as one of the Founding Fathers and Mothers of the Sierra Leone People's Party.

His reign was distinguished by his efforts to unite Sierra Leoneans of all ethnic groups together. He was a passionate advocate of education in Sierra Leone and he helped establish the Bo Government School.

== Issue ==
Name	Birth	Death	Spouse	Children
Samuel Gulama	unknown	unknown	unknown	Foday Momoh Gulama
Ella Koblo Gulama	26 January 1921	10 September 2006	Paramount Chief Bai Koblo Pathbana II	Francis Obai Kabia; Soccoh Kabia; Didi Kabia; Sheku; Gilo + 2
Komeh Gulama Lansana	unknown	unknown	Brigadier David Lansana	Sheku Lansana; Judy J. L. Rogers; Tala Lansana; Foday Lansana; Kornya Lansana
Messy Gulama	unknown	unknown	unknown	unknown
Yebu Gulama	unknown	unknown	unknown	unknown

== Marriage and family ==
Gulama was married to Lucy and had three children Samuel, Ella and Komeh. It is the tradition of paramount chief's in Sierra Leone to practice polygamy and have so-called "junior" wives. From Gulama's junior wife, Lunia, he fathered two more daughters Messy and Yebu.

Gulama was progressive and supported gender equality. He promoted education for women and girls in his chiefdom and led by example by having his daughter Ella accompany him to the Council of Chiefs and Protectorate Assembly Meetings.

== Ancestry ==
Ancestors of Julius Momoh Gulama

8. Paramount Chief Kaiyamba
4.Paramount Chief Yoko Gulama
9. Chief Consort Guwanalo
2. Paramount Chief Momoh Gulama
1. Julius Momoh Gulama
3. Chief Consort Tala Gulama
