= Soccoh Kabia =

Sierra Leonean politician and physician

Minister of Social Welfare and Children's Affairs
- Incumbent
- Assumed office October 26, 2007
- President: Ernest Bai Koroma
- Preceded by: Shirley Gbujama

Personal details
- Born: Bo, Sierra Leone
- Party: People's Movement for Democratic Change (PMDC)

Soccoh Kabia is a Sierra Leonean politician and physician who served as the Minister of Health, Minister of Social Welfare, Gender and Children's Affairs, and Minister of Fisheries and Marine Resources of Sierra Leone from 2007 to 2013.

== Early life and education ==
Kabia was born in Bo, Sierra Leone. His father is Paramount Chief Bai Koblo Pathbana II, an ethnic Temne from Lunsar, Port Loko District and his mother is Paramount Chief Madam Ella Koblo Gulama, an ethnic Mende. His parents ruled the two most influential royal houses in Sierra Leone. Between them, his parents ruled the two most important royal houses in Sierra Leone. His mother is widely considered the country's greatest stateswomen.

He is the younger brother of Francis Obai Kabia.

Kabia is a physician and nephrologist.

== Political career ==
He is currently the only member of the People's Movement for Democratic Change (PMDC) political party in the current cabinet of Ernest Bai Koroma.

Kabia attended medical school in the United States. He spent over thirty years as a medical doctor in the United States.

== Ancestry ==
Ancestors of Dr. Soccoh Kabia

4. Paramount Chief Bai Koblo Pathbana I
2. Paramount Chief Bai Koblo Pathbana II
1. Dr. Soccoh Kabia
23. Paramount Chief Kaiyamba
12. Paramount Chief Momoh Gulama
24.Chief Consort Guwanalo
6. Paramount Chief Julius Gulama
13. Chief Consort Tala Gulama
3. Paramount Chief Ella Koblo Gulama
7. Chief Consort Lucy Gulama
