= Momoh =

Momoh is a surname. Notable people with the surname include:

- Comfort Momoh (born c. 1962), British midwife, specializes in the treatment of female genital mutilation
- Hannah Momoh, First Lady of Sierra Leone
- John Momoh (born 1957), Nigerian broadcast journalist
- Joseph Saidu Momoh (1937–2003), President of Sierra Leone
- Tony Momoh (born 1939), Nigerian journalist and politician
- Zackary Momoh, British-Nigerian actor

== Given name ==
- Momoh Conteh (born 1999), Sierra Leonean footballer
- Momoh Gulama, Sierra Leonean paramount chief
