= Abraham Elliot Griffiths =

Abraham Elliot Griffiths (17?? – 1802) was one of the settlers who founded Sierra Leone, in West Africa.

Griffiths was of mixed African and Welsh heritage. He became a protégé of Granville Sharp while in London, having the costs of learning to read and write paid by his patron. He was one of the corporals of the Black Poor of London, and played a leading role in the organisation of the first expedition to Sierra Leone in 1787. He provided publicity for the colony by corresponding with the London newspapers. His first wife Rebecca was a white woman, but after she died he moved to Rogbana, becoming translator and adviser to Naimbanna II, marrying his daughter, who was later known as Clara.

In 1792 Griffiths was taken on as a translator by the Sierra Leone Company, having been recommended by Alexander Falconbridge. However, he failed to engage their trust, having supported Thomas Peters in his demand for a greater share in the running of the colony for the settlers. He was also accused of having forged some currency.

In 1802 he was imprisoned for debt and died in prison.
