= Komeh Gulama Lansana =

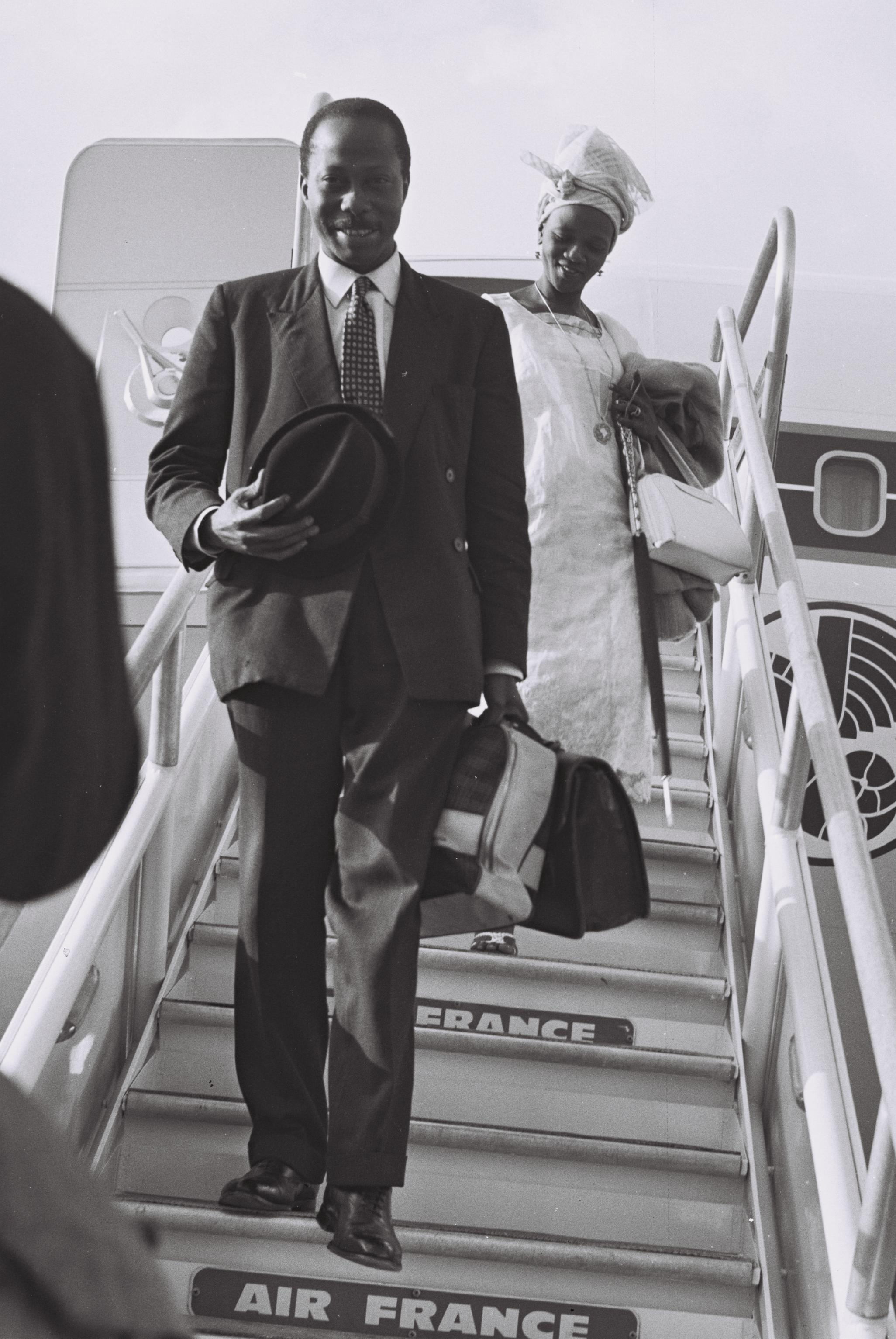
- David and Komeh Lansana arriving in Israel; April 1965
- Born: Moyamba, Sierra Leone
- Spouse: Brigadier David Lansana
- Children: Sheku Lansana; Judy J. L. Rogers; Tala Lansana; Foday Lansana; Kornya Lansana
- Parents: Paramount Chief Julius Gulama (father); Madam Lucy (mother)

Komeh Gulama Lansana was the wife of Brigadier David Lansana, Force Commander of the Sierra Leone Army until his execution in 1975.

Lansana is the daughter of Paramount Chief Julius Gulama, one of the Founding Fathers of postcolonial Sierra Leone, and Chief Consort Lucy Gulama. Her sister Paramount Chief Madam Ella Koblo Gulama was one of Sierra Leone's foremost stateswomen.

== Early life ==
Komeh was born in Moyamba, Moyamba District in the Southern Province of Sierra Leone to Paramount Chief Julius Gulama and his wife Chief Consort Lucy Gulama. Her father was the ruler Kaiyamba, the largest and most powerful Mende chiefdom in Sierra Leone. Her mother was also an ethnic Mende.

== Marriage and family ==
Her husband, David Lansana was appointed Commander of the Sierra Leone Armed Forces by Prime Minister Albert Margai while her sister Madam Gulama was serving as the first female Cabinet Minister in Sierra Leone and sub-Saharan African.

== 1967 Election ==
When Siaka Stevens was pronounced the winner of the hotly contested 1967 Elections, Prime Minister Albert Margai refused to concede defeat. Prime Minister Margai accused the All People's Congress of election fraud. There was no clear winner in the election.

Lansana's husband was Commander of the Sierra Leone Armed Forces at the time and staged an intervention. He had Governor General Sir Henry Lightfoot Boston and Siaka Stevens arrested. He announced that the election results void and declared martial law, and proclaimed himself the interim head of state. He staged the first coup d'état in the history of Sierra Leone.

A series of coups and counter-coups ensued which ended with both her husband and her sister arrested and held at Pademba Road Prisons. Her husband was arrested by his own soldiers and taken to Pademba Road Prison.

After more than a year in prison, her sister was exonerated and freed.

=== Execution of David Lansana ===
In July 1975, her husband David Lansana and his colleague Dr. Sorie Fornah were executed for treason after the alleged coup plot trials.
