= List of prisons in Sierra Leone =

The following is a list of prisons in Sierra Leone according to the Sierra Leone Encyclopedia:

The Prison headquarters is in Freetown. The Prison Officers Training School is in Waterloo.

- Freetown Central Prison, Freetown, Western Region
- Waterloo Oil Palm Plantation, Waterloo, Western Region
- Masanki Prison, Masanki, Southern Region
- Moyamba Prison, Moyamba, Southern Region
- Bo Prison, Bo, Southern Region
- Bonthe Prison, Bonthe, Southern Region
- Pujehun Prison, Pujehun, Southern Region
- Makeni Prison, Makeni, Northern Region
- Port Loko Prison, Port Loko, Northern Region
- Kambia Prison, Kambia, Northern Region
- Kabala Prison, Kabala, Northern Region
- Magburaka Prison, Magburaka, Northern Region
- Mafanta Prison, Magburaka, Northern Region
- Kenema Prison, Kenema, Eastern Region
- Kono Prison, Sefadu, Eastern Region
- Kailahun Prison, Kailahun, Eastern Region
