= John Naimbanna =

Temne Prince

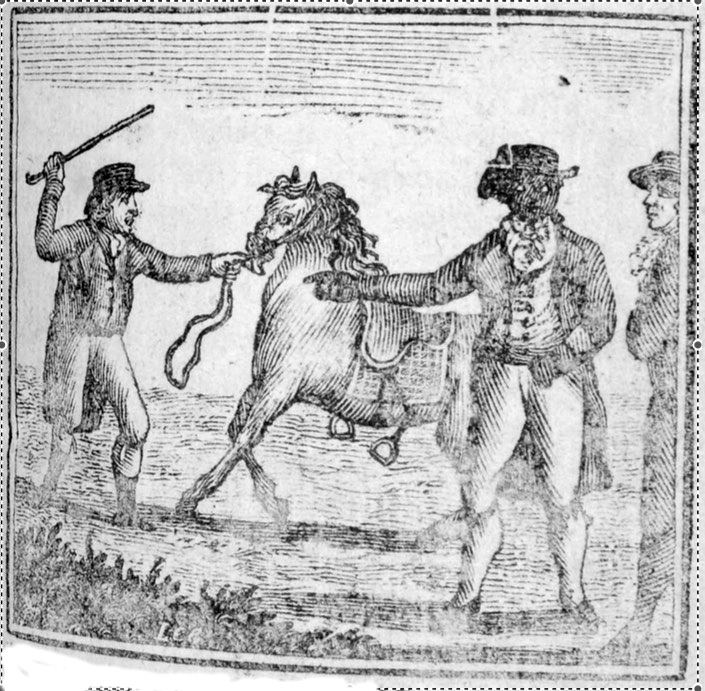
- An illustration depicting John Naimbanna, J. Evans
- Died: 1793; Sierra Leone
- Other name: Frederick Henry Glanville
- Years active: 1790s
- Known for: Eighteenth century African visitor to London

Announcement of the death of Prince Naimbanna, Bury and Norwich Post, 1 January 1794

John Naimbanna (c. 1768–1793) was a Temne prince who visited London in 1791–1793. He was the son of Nemgbana, the regent of the Koya Temne. He met an untimely death after being educated in England, where he was known as Prince Naimbana. He had anticipated becoming a missionary in his homeland but died on his return.

John was the son of Naimbanna II, the Obai (king) of the Temne people of Robanna, near Sierra Leone. The king had three sons and resolved to send one each to Britain, Portugal and the Ottoman Empire to study Protestantism, Catholicism and Islam, respectively. Thus in 1791 John was sent to England on the small merchant sloop Lapwing. There he came under the tutelage of the reformer Henry Thornton. While in London he became a Christian, adopting the forenames Henry and Granville to honour Henry Thornton and Granville Sharp.

== Early life ==
John Frederick Nemgbana, also known as the Black Prince, was sent to England for education in 1791, funded by the Sierra Leone Company (SLC). His elder brother, Pedro, also known as Bartholomew, had previously been educated in France. During his voyage, Nemgbana was accompanied by Alexander Falconbridge, an agent of the company. Falconbridge’s wife, Anna Maria Falconbridge, who would later write Narrative of Two Voyages to the River Sierra Leone (1794), took it upon herself to teach him reading and writing, recognizing his intelligence.

== In England ==
Upon arriving in England, Nemgbana caught the attention of Granville Sharp, a prominent abolitionist and Member of Parliament. Sharp, who was also the founder of the Province of Freedom for freed slaves, arranged for Nemgbana’s education under a Church of England clergyman, certified by two bishops. The hope was that Nemgbana would become as beneficial to Africa as historical figures like Alfred and Peter had been to their nations. His virtues were highlighted in a pamphlet titled "The African Prince," which depicted him rejecting an inappropriate book.

== Return to Sierra Leone ==
John Frederick’s father, the regent, died in February 1793. Later that year, Nemgbana returned to Sierra Leone with aspirations of preaching the gospel and converting others. However, he contracted an illness during his return journey and, after arriving in Freetown, died in July 1793. His brother Pedro alleged that John Frederick had been poisoned to prevent him from disclosing secrets about the white men to his fellow countrymen. This accusation led to a prolonged dispute between the ship’s captain and the family, further complicating the circumstances surrounding Nemgbana’s death.
