= Falconbridge =

Falconbridge may refer to:

- Falconbridge Ltd., a Canadian mining company
- Falconbridge, Middlesex County, Ontario
- Falconbridge, Greater Sudbury, Ontario
- Falconbridge FC, a Sudbury soccer club

== People with the surname ==
- Lord Falconbridge, an alternative title for barons, viscounts, and earls of Fauconberg
- Jonathan Falconbridge Kelly (1817–1855), American author who published as "Falconbridge"
- Alexander Falconbridge (1760–1791), British surgeon and anti-slavery activist
- Anna Maria Falconbridge (1769–1835), British author
- William Glenholme Falconbridge (1846–1920), Canadian judge and lawyer

== See also ==
- Falconberg (disambiguation)
- Bastard of Fauconberg
