= Duke of Buccleugh (1783 ship) =

British ship

History

Great Britain
- Name: Duke of Buccleugh
- Namesake: Duke of Buccleuch
- Builder: Yarmouth
- Launched: 1783
- Captured: September 1797

General characteristics
- Tons burthen: 239, or 260 (bm)
- Complement: 1794: 25; 1796: 25
- Armament: 1794: 12 × 4-pounder guns + 4 swivel guns; 1796: 14 × 4-pounder guns + 2 swivel guns

Duke of Buccleugh (or Duke of Buccleuch), was launched at Yarmouth in 1783. In 1789 she became a slave ship in the triangular trade in enslaved people. She made five complete enslaving voyages. On her fifth she had to repel an attack by a French privateer in a single ship action. A French privateer captured her in September 1797 after she had delivered her captives on her sixth voyage.

== Career ==
Duke of Buccleugh first appeared in Lloyd's Register (LR) in 1784 with J.Ritchie, master, Thompson, owner, and trade London–New York.

Year	Master	Owner	Trade	Source & notes
1789	J.Ritchie	Thompson	"Gorgi"–London	LR
1791	M'Lean	J.Anderson	London–Africa	LR

1st enslaving voyage (1788–1789): Captain John McLean sailed from London on 16 July 1788. Duke of Buccleugh primarily acquired her captives at the Sierra Leone estuary, and then acquired some more at Bance Island. She arrived at Grenada on 1 March 1789. She had embarked 373 captives and she arrived with 365, eight having died on the voyage. She landed 358, for a mortality rate of 4%. She arrived back at London on 16 July.

The Slave Trade Act 1788 (Dolben's Act) was the first British legislation passed to regulate the shipping of enslaved people. The Act limited the number of enslaved people that British slave ships could transport, based on the ships' tons burthen. At a burthen of 239 tons, the cap would have been 378 captives.

After the passage of Dolben's Act, masters received a bonus of £100 for a mortality rate of under 2%; the ship's surgeon received £50. For a mortality rate between two and three per cent, the bonus was halved. There was no bonus if mortality exceeded 3%. (Note: At the time the monthly wage for a captain of an enslaving ship out of Bristol was £5 per month.)

2nd enslaving voyage (1789–1790): Captain McLean sailed from London on 19 September 1789. After acquiring slaves in West Africa, Duke of Buccleugh arrived at Kingston on 1 June 1790 with 348 captives. She arrived back at London on 24 November 1790.

3rd enslaving voyage (1791–1792): Captain McLean sailed from London on 24 January 1791. Duke of Buccleugh sailed to Bance Island where she started acquiring captives on 1 June. She was also carrying as passengers Dr. Alexander Falconbridge, his wife Anna Maria, and brother William, of the Clapham Sect and the Anti-Slavery Society, who had come out with the intent of reorganising the failed settlement of freed slaves in Granville Town, Sierra Leone. On the voyage out Falconbridge had numerous drunken disputes with Captain Malean; Anna Maria would retire to here cabin during these disputes.

Duke of Buccleugh arrived at Kingston on 9 November. She had embarked 358 captives and she arrived with 352. She landed 350, for a mortality rate of just over 2%. She arrived back at London on 18 March 1792.

4th enslaving voyage (1792–1793): Captain McLean sailed from London on 25 July 1792. Duke of Buccleugh started gathering captives at Bance Island on 2 October. However, she then purchased most of her captives at the Sierra Leone estuary. She sailed from Africa on 10 January 1793 and arrived at Kingston on 11 February. She had embarked 317 captives and she arrived with 315, for a 1% mortality rate. She sailed from Kingston on 15 April and arrived back at London on 7 June.

5th enslaving voyage (1794–1795): War with France had broken out while Duke of Buccleugh was at Kingston on her fourth voyage. Before she set out on her fifth voyage, Captain McLean acquired a letter of marque on 16 June 1794. He sailed from London on 15 July.

Duke of Buccleugh was at Bance Island when on 18 September 1794 a French naval squadron comprising the razee Experiment under the command of lieutenant de vaisseau Arnaud, Vigilance, Félicité, Pervie, and Mutine arrived. They were cruising the West African coast, destroying British factories and shipping. At Bance they captured numerous vessels.

Only Duke of Buccleuch and Ann Philippa, of Liverpool, Lovelace, master, escaped. To escape, Duke of Buccleuch, armed only with four-pounder guns, had to repel an attack by Pervie, which was armed with eighteen 12-pounder guns, and had a crew of 220 men. (Note: Pervie was probably the transport Perrier, of 200 tons (bm), which the French Navy had requisitioned at Le Havre in February 1794, and returned to her owners before the end of the year)

Duke of Buccleugh remained on the coast. She returned to Bance Island. She arrived there on 15 January 1795 and she sailed from Africa on 29 January. She arrived at Kingston on 13 March. Lloyd's List reported that on her way she had repelled an attack by a French privateer.

Duke of Buccleugh had embarked 373 captives and she arrived with 365, for a mortality rate just under 3%. She arrived back at London on 18 August.

6th enslaving voyage (1796–1797): Captain George Cleland acquired a letter of marque on 17 September 1796. He sailed from London on 3 October. Duke of Buccleugh gathered captives at Bance Island, but then gathered more in the Sierra Leone estuary. She arrived at Kingston, Jamaica on 12 July 1797 with 375 captives.

== Fate ==
On 6 September 1797, Duke of Buccleugh was homeward bound when she was captured and taken into Santiago de Cuba.

In 1797, 104 British vessels left British ports on enslaving voyages, 12 from London. That year at least 40 British enslaving ships (38%), were lost, with at least two being lost on their homeward voyage. During the period 1793 to 1807, war, rather than maritime hazards or resistance by the captives, was the greatest cause of vessel losses among British slave vessels.
