= David Lansana =

Brigadier David Lansana
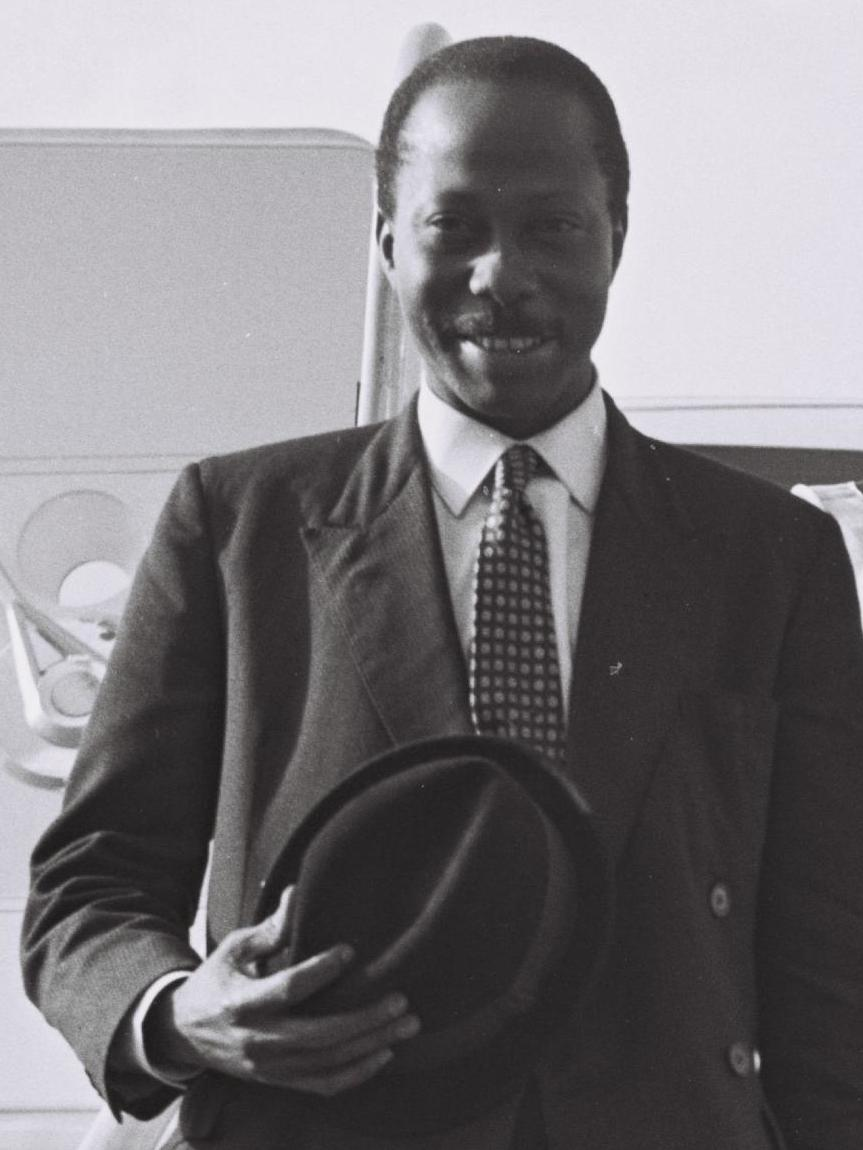
- David Lansana arriving for a visit in Israel; April 1965
- Born: David Lansana; March 22, 1922; Baiima, Mandu Chiefdom, Kailahun District, British Sierra Leone
- Died: July 19, 1975 (aged 53); Pademba Road Prison, Freetown, Sierra Leone
- Burial place: Freetown, Sierra Leone
- Spouse: Komeh Gulama Lansana
- Children: Sheku Lansana; Judy Rogers (née Lansana); Tala Lansana; Foday Lansana; Kornya Lansana
- Relatives: PC Julius Gulama, father-in-law; Madame Lucy Gulama mother-in-law; Ella Koblo Gulama sister-in-law; Messie Gulama sister-in-law; Yebu Gulama sister-in-law
- Military career
- Allegiance: (United Kingdom) British Empire (1947–1961); Sierra Leone (1961–1967)
- Service years: 1947–1972
- Rank: Force Commander; Brigadier
- Commands: First Battalion, Royal Sierra Leone Regiment; First Sierra Leone Contingent, Congo Operations of the United Nations Organization

Brigadier David Lansana (22 March 1922 – 19 July 1975) was a Sierra Leonean military officer and prominent military figure in Sierra Leone during its colonial and post-independence period. Lansana was one of the most distinguished officers in the history of the Sierra Leone Armed Forces, and was one of the first Sierra Leoneans to train at the Royal Military Academy Sandhurst, Berkshire, United Kingdom.

Through his marriage to Komeh Gulama Lansana, the daughter of Paramount Chief Julius Gulama of Kaiyamba Chiefdom, Lansana was therefore a relative of Paramount Chief Ella Koblo Gulama and her husband Paramount Chief Bai Koblo Pathbana II, two of the nation's most influential politicians.

On 21 March 1967, Lansana staged Sierra Leone's first coup d'état. Lansana was charged with treason, tried and found guilty, and was eventually executed on 19 July 1975.

== Early life and education ==
Lansana was born on 22 March 1922 in Baiima, Mandu Chiefdom, Kailahun District, British Sierra Leone. He was a Mende.

In 1947, he enlisted as a private and began his training in the Sierra Leone Army. Lansana was the bearer of Sierra Leone's colours during the coronation of Queen Elizabeth II.

=== Royal Military Academy Sandhurst ===
Lansana was one of a small, elite group of Sierra Leoneans to be educated and trained at the Royal Military Academy Sandhurst, Berkshire, United Kingdom during the colonial period.

As a Lieutenant, he was a frequent and popular visitor to the home of Sir Robert de Zouche Hall, Governor of Sierra Leone from 1952 to 1956.

== Marriage and family ==
He was married to Komeh Gulama Lansana, the daughter of Paramount Chief Julius Gulama of Kaiyamba Chiefdom and Madame Lucy Gulama. The Gulamas are Mende royalty and among the most important ruling families in Sierra Leone.

His father-in-law was a founding member of the Sierra Leone People's Party, the first and oldest political party in the country. His sister-in-law was Paramount Chief Ella Koblo Gulama. His brother-in-law was Paramount Chief Bai Koblo Pathbana II.

Lansana and his wife had five children Sheku, Judy, Tala, Foday, and Kornya. Lansana also had a son, Daniel, from another relationship.

=== Force Commander of the Sierra Leone Military ===
He was appointed army commander of Sierra Leone in 1964.

When his close friend and ally Prime Minister Albert Margai came to power, Brigadier Lansana took control of the army from British colonial adviser, Brigadier R.D. Blackie. Margai promoted a one-party (non-democratic) state. Both Lansana and Margai came from the Mende tribe which exacerbated existing conflicts with the northern tribes and the Krios. Northern and Krio officers were systematically purged from the armed forces.

== Sierra Leone's first coup d'état ==
=== 1967 general election ===
On 17 March 1967, Margai was defeated in the general election. The All People's Congress (APC) won 32 seats in parliament while Margai's SLPP held on to just 28 seats.

=== Martial law ===
Sierra Leone was the first country in postcolonial Africa to hold a successful democratic election. This distinction lasted only four days. On 21 March 1967, Lansana instructed Samuel Hinga Norman to conduct the extrajudicial arrest of the new, democratically elected prime minister Siaka Stevens. The arrest took place prior to the announcement of the election result.

Lansana then seized control of Government House as well as the national radio and television channels and declared martial law in Sierra Leone.

On 22 March 1967, Lansana made a second radio broadcast reiterating his declaration of martial law. He was determined to restore Albert Margai to power.

=== Counter coup ===
Lansana's unilateral decision was unpopular with many of his fellow Mende officers who did not believe the army should be a tool of internal government. In addition to this, before the coup d'état his influence with his subordinates had been compromised by accusations of "drunkenness" and "womanizing".

On 23 March 1967, Major Charles Blake and other senior military officers relieved Lansana of his command. They established the National Reformation Council (NRC) and took control of the government.

Subsequently, Lt.-Colonel Andrew Juxon-Smith, of the Krio community, who was abroad when the coup took place, was asked to return and head the NRC military regime in 1968.

=== Arrest ===
Both Lansana and his sister-in-law Paramount Chief Ella Koblo Gulama were arrested on charges of treason and detained at Padema Road Prison. Both were charged with conspiracy with former Prime Minister Albert Margai.

The claim was based on a meeting between Gulama and Margai on 19 March 1967 in which Margai is said to have expressed his wish not to lose his office. He was said to be weighing his options, including military intervention.

Gulama was a minister without portfolio in Margai's government. She was also the hereditary ruler of Kaiyamba District, the most powerful Mende chiefdom in Sierra Leone. She reportedly advised him not to stand down from the office of prime minister in spite of the APC victory. She was also reported to have offered him her formidable support and suggested that both Margai bribe Lansana to stage a coup d'état.

The charges against Gulama could not be proven and she was released from prison after one and a half year.

=== Incarceration and execution ===
Lansana was detained at Pademba Road Prison, Freetown, Sierra Leone.

On 19 July 1975, Lansana was executed by hanging with former Minister of Finance Mohamed Forna, Lieutenant Habib Lansana Kamara, Ibrahim Bash Taqi, and Paramount Chief Bai Makarie N’silk were executed at Pademba Road Prison.

After their executions, their bodies were displayed for an hour.

== See also ==
- Komeh Gulama Lansana
- Paramount Chief Julius Gulama
- Madame Lucy Gulama
- Ella Koblo Gulama
- Paramount Chief Bai Koblo Pathbana II
- Sir Albert Margai
- Siaka Probyn Stevens
