= Lapwing (EIC packet ship) =

Three ships named Lapwing have served the British East India Company (EIC) as packet ships. The packets were much smaller than the great East Indiamen. The packets' primary role was to carry dispatches quickly back and forth between London and the company's headquarters in Bengal and on the Coromandel Coast. The packets did also carry some cargo and passengers.

- Lapwing (1743 EIC packet) - a fast sailing packet launched in 1743 that made five voyages for the British East India Company (EIC) before she was condemned in 1751 as unfit for further service.
- Lapwing (1762 EIC packet) - a packet ship launched in 1762 that made two round-trip voyages to India for the EIC before the EIC sold her in Bengal in 1765 when she arrived there on her third voyage.
- Lapwing (1769 EIC packet) - a packet ship of obscure origin and fate that made two round-trip voyages to India for the ECI between 1769 and 1773.
