= Falconberg =

Falconberg may refer to Falconbridge. It may also refer to:

- Falconberg or Falconbridge, the Bastard (died 1226). See Falkes de Breauté
- Falconberg or Falconbridge, Bastard of (died 1471). See Thomas Fauconberg

== See also ==
- Bastard of Fauconberg
