= Lucy Gulama =

Madam Lucy Gulama
- Great Wife of Kaiyamba Chiefdom
- Reign: unknown - 1953
- Born: 26 September 1896; Moyamba, Sierra Leone
- Died: 1966 (aged 69–70); Moyamba, Sierra Leone
- Burial: Moyamba, Sierra Leone
- Spouse: Paramount Chief Julius Gulama
- Issue: Samuel, Ella, Komeh
- House: Gulama

Madam Lucy Gulama (26 September 1896–1966) was the Sierra Leonean wife of Paramount Chief Julius Gulama.

Madam Lucy was the matriarch of one of Sierra Leone's most powerful noble families. She is the mother of Paramount Chief Madam Ella Koblo Gulama and Komeh Gulama Lansana, the widow of Brigadier David Lansana, the late Commander of Sierra Leone's Armed Forces who briefly served as a military junta leader before his removal and subsequent execution after a counter coup in 1975.

Her husband, Julius Gulama, was Paramount Chief of Kaiyamba Chiefdom. He was known in Sierra Leone for efforts to promote unity among the country’s ethnic groups and for supporting education initiatives.
