= Alie Koblo Queen Kabia II =

Sierra Leonean paramount chief

- 44th Paramount Chief of Marampa
- Predecessor: Bai Koblo Pathbana II
- Successor: Bai Koblo Queen Kabia II
- Born: Marampa, Masimera Chiefdom, Sierra Leone
- Died: 16 December 1997
- House: Koblo
- Religion: Islam

Koblo
- Royal house
- Parent family: Kabia
- Country: Sierra Leone
- Origin: Marampa, Masimera Chiefdom, Sierra Leone
- Founder: Kekelay Kaba
- Titles: Paramount Chief
- Connected members: Bai Koblo Pathbana II; Ella Koblo Gulama; Soccoh Kabia
- Connected families: Gulama
- Heirlooms: Staff
- Estates: Marampa, Masimera Chiefdom, Sierra Leone

Alie Koblo Queen Kabia II (born Alhaji Alie Osman Kabia) was a Sierra Leonean paramount chief. In 1986, he succeeded Bai Koblo Pathbana II and was crowned the 44th Paramount Chief of Marampa Chiefdom. He ruled from his seat at Lunsar, Port Loko District, Sierra Leone.

== Sierra Leone Civil War ==
In 1991, the Sierra Leone Civil War broke out. The National Provisional Ruling Council (NPRC) deposed Chief Koblo and seized Marampa Chiefdom in order to control the iron ore mine.

Chief Koblo was in exile until 2002 when he was reinstated.

== Legacy ==
He was succeeded by his son Osman Ali Kabia assumed the regnal name Bai Koblo Queen Kabia II. He is regarded as one of the richest men in Sierra Leone name="Harvard" />
