= Francis Obai Kabia =

Sierra Leonean politician

Operations Officer UN Department of Peacekeeping Operations
- In office 1983–2006

Personal details
- Born: Bo, Sierra Leone
- Party: Sierra Leone People's Party (SLPP)

Francis Obai Kabia is a Sierra Leonean politician who was operations officer for the UN Department of Peacekeeping Operations from 1983 to 2006.

In 2010, Kabia announced his campaign for the 2012 Sierra Leone People's Party (SLPP) nomination for President of Sierra Leone. He won 1.5% of the vote at the 2011 SLPP National Party Conference Elections with the majority of the vote going to Julius Maada Bio.

== Early life and education ==
His father is paramount chief Bai Koblo Pathbana II, an ethnic Temne from Lunsar, Port Loko District and his mother is paramount chief Madam Ella Koblo Gulama, an ethnic Mende. His parents ruled the two most influential royal houses in Sierra Leone. His mother is widely considered the country's greatest stateswomen. His middle name is a tribute to his ancestor Obai, the original ruler of the Temne in the Kingdom of Koya in the 15th century.

He is the eldest child of Paramount Chief Bai Koblo Pathana II.

Kabia went to Christ the King College in Bo, Sierra Leone. In 1973, he earned his bachelor's degree in Economic and Business Administration at Lebanon Valley College. In 1975, he earned a master's degree in Public administration at Penn State University. He earned a certificate in Conflict Management at Harvard University Kennedy School of Government in 2000.

== Political career ==
Kabia returned to Sierra Leone and became the District Chair for SLPP in Port Loko. His grandfather Paramount Chief Julius Gulama was one of the founding members of the Sierra Leone People's Party (SLPP).

In 2008, Kabia announced his campaign for the 2008 Sierra Leone People's Party (SLPP) nomination for President of the Sierra Leone.
