= Naimbanna II =

Obai (King) of the Temne people of Sierra Leone

Naimbanna II (c. 1720 – 11 November 1793) was Obai (King) of the Temne people of Sierra Leone. He was known to be a kind ruler.

In 1786, the British government agreed to help the Committee for the Relief of the Black Poor in relocating freed Africans to West Africa, and intended to purchase land from the Temne people. An agreement was made without Naimbanna's knowledge with one of his sub-chiefs, Tombo, called King Tom by the British, to permanently cede an area land, which was then called the Province of Freedom. Tombo could not read or write, so was likely unaware of the implications. After Tombo's death, Naimbanna realised the details of the treaty, and requested a new treaty, which was signed in 1788.

In 1791 he sent his eldest son, John Frederick Naimbanna, went to England where he came under the tutelage of Henry Thornton. While in London he became a Christian adopting the forenames Henry and Granville after Henry Thornton and Granville Sharp.
