= Moyamba (Sierra Leone Parliament constituency) =

Moyamba is a constituency of the Parliament of Sierra Leone. It is located in Moyamba District.

As of 2008, it is represented in parliament by J. Jonathan Ambo.
