= Momoh Gulama =

Paramount Chief Momoh Gulama
- Paramount Chief of Kaiyamba Chiefdom, Moyamba District
- Predecessor: Paramount Chief Kaiyamba
- Successor: Paramount Chief Julius Gulama
- Born: Moyamba, Sierra Leone
- Died: Moyamba, Sierra Leone
- Burial: Moyamba, Sierra Leone
- Spouse: Tala Gulama
- Issue: Julius Gulama
- House: Gulama
- Father: Kaiyamba
- Mother: Guwanalo

Momoh Gulama was a Sierra Leonean paramount chief who ruled Kaiyamba Chiefdom in Moyamba District.

== Early life ==
Gulama was born in Moyamba, Moyamba District in the Southern Province of Sierra Leone. His was the second son of Kaiyamba, a Mende warrior who came to Moyamba from Kono sometime in the 1820s and his wife was Guwanalo.

His brothers were also chiefs and founded the royal houses Boyawa and M’Bomeh.

== Family ==
He is the father of Paramount Chief Julius Gulama and the grandfather of Paramount Chief Madam Ella Koblo Gulama.
