= Lapwing (1794 ship) =

History

Great Britain
- Name: Lapwing
- Owner: 1800: G. and J. Fisher; 1801: C. Anderson
- Builder: Bristol
- Launched: 1794
- Captured: 11 December 1801

General characteristics
- Tons burthen: 1794: 226 (bm); 1797: 313 (bm; after lengthening)
- Complement: 45
- Armament: 22 × 9&6-pounder guns

Lapwing was launched at Bristol in 1794, and lengthened in 1797. She was a West Indiaman until in 1801 she became a slave ship in the triangular trade in enslaved people. However, on her first enslaving voyage a Spanish privateer captured her. Although the Spanish authorities ordered her restitution to her owners, it is not clear that the order was anything but moot.

== Career ==
Lapwing was first listed in Lloyd's List (LR) in 1794.

Year	Master	Owner	Trade	Source & notes
1794	D.Brown	G.Fisher	Bristol–St. Vincent	LR
1796	D.Brown; P.Leyson	G.Fisher	Bristol–St. Vincent	LR
1797	J.Duncan	G.Fisher	Bristol–Tobago	LR
1801	J.Duncan; R.Curran	G&J.Fisher; C.Anderson	Bristol–Tobago	LR; lengthened 1797

Transporting enslaved people (1801): Captain Robert Curran acquired a letter of marque on 21 March 1801. He sailed from Bristol on 13 April 1801. On 19 May Lapwing, Corran, master, was "all well" at Cape Mount. On 20 October she was at Cape Coast Castle.

On 11 December as Lapwing, of Bristol, Curran, master, was on her way to Demerara from Africa, a Spanish privateer captured her off Demerara and took her into Orinoco. She was carrying 330 captives, 4480 pounds of ivory, 215 ounces of gold, and some trade goods. Lapwing was condemned and sold.

The Spanish Government ordered her returned to her owner, with damages. The privateer had captured Lapwing one day after the end of hostilities. Her value at the time of capture was estimated at £43,800. It is not clear how much her owners recovered, given that she had been sold and payments disbursed.

Anderson had insured Lapwing for £26,500. In 1806 Anderson petitioned the British Government and gave his losses as £57,511 15s 6d, including interest. The wording of his petition is such that it is not clear whether the claim was net of the proceeds of insurance or not.

In 1801, 23 British ships in the trade in enslaved people had been lost. Ten had been lost in the Middle Passage, sailing between Africa and the West Indies. During the period 1793 to 1807, war, rather than maritime hazards or resistance by the captives, was the greatest cause of vessel losses among British vessels carrying enslaved people.
