= Ella Koblo Gulama =

Sierra Leone politician

Madam Ella Koblo-Gulama OBE, GCOR
- Paramount Chief of Kaiyamba Chiefdom, Moyamba District
- Reign: 1953–2006
- Predecessor: Julius Momoh Gulama
- Successor: Momoh Foday Gulama
- Born: 26 January 1921; Moyamba, British Sierra Leone
- Died: 9 September 2006 (aged 85); Moyamba, Sierra Leone
- Burial: Moyamba, Sierra Leone
- Spouse: Bai Koblo Pathbana II
- Issue: Francis Obai Kabia; Alex Soccoh Kabia
- House: Gulama
- Father: Julius Momoh Gulama
- Mother: Lucy Gulama

Paramount Chief Ella Koblo Gulama OBE, GCOR (26 January 1921 – 9 September 2006) was a Sierra Leonean paramount chief and politician. In 1957, she became the first elected female Member of Parliament in Sierra Leone. She was re-elected in 1962. During the government of Milton Margai, Gulama became Sierra Leone and sub-Saharan Africa's first female Cabinet Minister.

Gulama represented Sierra Leone abroad and her travels took her all over Africa, Europe, North America, and the Middle East. In 1957 as a guest of the State Department, she toured the United States for 4 months during which she met with Vice-President Richard Nixon.

== Biography ==
=== Early life and education ===
On 21 January 1921, Gulama was born into one of Sierra Leone's most powerful families in the town of Moyamba, Moyamba District in the Southern Province of British Sierra Leone. Her mother was Lucy Gulama and her father Paramount Chief Julius Gulama were both ethnic Mendes. Like his father, Paramount Chief Momoh Gulama, Julius was Paramount Chief of Kaiyamba Chiefdom.

Ella was educated at the Harford School for Girls in Moyamba, and the Women Teacher's College, then at Fourah Bay College in Freetown.

=== Marriage ===
In 1944 Gulama married the powerful Paramount Chief Bai Koblo Pathbana II of Marampa, Masimera Chiefdom, an ethnic Temne. Their cross-tribal union was a shining example of national cohesion.

From 1944 to 1952 Gulama resided at Lunsar where she was chief Consort. The couple had seven children, including Frances, Francis Obai, Jubilee, Alex Soccoh, June, Julius Maada, and Jilo.

Koblo was multilingual and spoke fluent English, Mende, Temne, and Sherbro.

=== Political career ===
Gulama had a distinguished career in politics and was a pioneering female leader. Her life was defined by service. She was a member of the Sierra Leone People's Party (SLPP), which her father helped establish. In 1957 Gulama embarked on a political career and became a Member of the Moyamba District Council. She was the first woman to be elected to Sierra Leone's House of Representatives as Paramount Chief Member for Moyamba District. In 1962 she was re-elected and Prime Minister Milton Margai made her a Cabinet Minister. She was the first woman to hold a ministerial post in sub-Saharan Africa. From 1960 to 1967 Gulama was President of the Federation of Women's Organisations in Sierra Leone.

During her chieftaincy, she had the streets of Moyamba paved and hired a British construction company to install clean tap water.

In the 1967 general elections Gulama regained her seat and was serving in the government of Sir Albert Margai. However, the opposition All People's Congress (APC) had narrowly won a parliamentary majority. A power struggle between the candidates, Margai of the SLPP and Siaka Stevens of the APC ensued, destabilising the country and resulting in a rapid succession of military coups.

When Steven's APC party eventually ascended to power and began their 30-year grip on Sierra Leone. Gulama was accused of collaborating with her brother-in-law David Lansana in his coup d'état against Stevens. She placed under arrest and held at Pademba Road prison for over a year. She was later exonerated and released. While she was in prison Stevens appointed her husband Paramount Chief Bai Koblo Pathbana II to his cabinet. Her estranged husband's acceptance of the position strengthened the innuendo that Gulama's relationship with Sir Albert Margai was much more than a professional one. Gulama was briefly forced into political exile after Sir Albert Margai lost power.

In the early 1970s, Gulama revamped her political career and became the leader of the APC Women's Organisation of Moyamba District. From 1985 to 1991 Gulama served as the president of the National Organization for Women (Sierra Leone). In 1992, she was unanimously re-elected Paramount Chief of Kaiyamba Chiefdom. Gulama collaborated with several NGOs to develop the infrastructural and agriculture of her Chiefdom and district.

=== Sierra Leone Civil War ===
The mercenary Revolutionary United Front (RUF) ravaged Sierra Leone and devastated Moyamba District, killing tens of thousands of people and destroying everything Gulama had spent her life building up. When the rebels began a campaign to assassinate every paramount chief in the country. Chief Bunduka of Kailahun District and Paramount Chief Bonai Fei of Bo were brutally executed by the rebels. When Gulama's chiefdom was attacked and the rebels set fire to her compound and burned it to the ground. Gulama was forced to refugee to the nation's capital Freetown.

She returned to Moyamba and began the reconstruction of her Chiefdom and Moyamba District but Gulama's health began to fail her. Nevertheless, she was able to continue her service to her country with the Sierra Leone Export Development and Investment Corporation (SLEDIC) (1994–1996) as one of the directors of The Sierra Leone Commercial Bank Limited.

== Feminism ==
One of Gulama's passions was the promotion of education for girls and the improvement of the female condition in Sierra Leone. She served at her alma mater, Harford School for Girls as a member of the Board of Governors. Gulama was also a member of the Sierra Leone government Scholarship Advisory Board and the Bursary Committee of Fourah Bay College.

== United Methodist Church ==
Gulama was a Christian and very active in the United Methodist Church. She was vice president of the church's Conference on Finance and Administration from 1985 to 1991.

== Awards and honours ==
She was the recipient of several awards including the MBE in 1959, the OBE in 1965 from Her Majesty Queen Elizabeth for "public services as Minister without Portfolio", and a Grand Commander of the Order of the Rokel from President Ahmed Tejan Kabbah.

== Death ==
Gulama died on 10 September 2006. On 24 September 2006, thousands of mourners gathered to attend her memorial service at Trinity United Methodist Church in Moyamba. At the service, she was described as "a woman of substance", by President Ahmed Tejan Kabbah who added:

Madam Ella Koblo-Gulama has lived an exemplary life, as a mother, wife and stateswoman whose fortitude has earned her high respect.

== Honours ==
- United Kingdom: 1965 Birthday Honours - Officer of the Order of the British Empire.
- Sierra Leone: Grand Commander of the Order of the Rokel.
