= Lapwing (1769 EIC packet) =

History

Great Britain
- Name: Lapwing
- Namesake: Lapwing
- Operator: British East India Company
- Builder: Hull
- Launched: 1745
- Fate: Last listed 1789

General characteristics
- Tons burthen: 120 [(bm)
- Sail plan: Snow

Lapwing was a packet ship that made two round-trips to India for the British East India Company (EAC). Currently, both her origin and her fate are obscure, though it is possible that she was launched at Hull in 1745 and was last listed in 1789.

== EIC voyages ==
=== EIC voyage #1 (1769–71) ===
Captain Henry Gardiner left The Downs on 6 June 1769, bound for Bengal and Madras. Lapwing left Kolkata on 24 August 1770 and on 12 October was at Madras. She reached the Cape on 16 December and St Helena on 6 January 1771, and arrived back at The Downs on 16 April.

Lapwing stopped at Falmouth before reaching The Downs and Captain Gardiner came overland to London. He brought the news that although Madras was quiet, a threat of war hung over Bengal. The Mogul emperor (Shah Alam II) had allied with the Marathas, and Sujah Dowla (the Nawab of Bengal), would require British assistance.

=== EIC voyage #2 (1771–73) ===
Captain Gardiner sailed from Portsmouth on 2 September 1771, bound for Bengal. Lapwing reached False Bay on 25 November, and arrived at Calcutta on 23 April 1772. Homeward bound she was at Ingeli, a point on the west side of the Hooghli Estuary on 17 November. She left Bengal on 20 September and Madras on 14 October. She reached the Cape on 26 January 1773, St Helena on 16 February, and Ascension Island on 22 February. She arrived at Falmouth on 15 April, and returned to The Downs on 1 May.

When Lapwing reached Falmouth her purser left her and travelled overland to India House in London. There he reported her arrival at Falmouth, and that Captain Gardiner was no longer with her. (He had sought employment with the Bengal Pilot Service.) The purser also reported that a terrible famine had descended on Bengal, killing an enormous number of people. Bad weather had destroyed the "fruits of the earth", and the country ships that normally brought provisions had not arrived.

== Possible origin and fate ==
Lloyd's Register (LR) for 1776 showed one vessel named Lapwing. She was a brig of 120 tons (bm), launched at Hull in 1745 that had undergone a thorough repair in 1765. Her master was Henry Peach, her owner was W. Burstall, and her trade was Hull–London. She was last listed in 1789.
