= Momoh Conteh =

Sierra Leonean footballer

Personal information
- Date of birth: 1 December 1999 (age 26)
- Place of birth: Sierra Leone
- Positions: Midfielder; forward

Team information
- Current team: Maryland Bobcats FC
- Number: 32

Senior career*
Years	Team	Apps	(Gls)
- Diamond Stars
2019–	Maryland Bobcats FC		

International career^{‡}
2020–	Sierra Leone	1	(0)
- * Club domestic league appearances and goals ‡ National team caps and goals as of 13 October 2020

Momoh Conteh (born 1 December 1999) is a Sierra Leonean footballer who plays for Maryland Bobcats FC in the National Independent Soccer Association and the Sierra Leone national team.

== Career ==
Conteh made his debut for Sierra Leone on 13 October 2020 in an international friendly against Niger. He started and played over 70 minutes before being subbed off.
