= Condemned Hole =

Site on the River Thames

Coordinates: 51°29′52.06″N 0°1′59.46″W

The Condemned Hole was a site in Rotherhithe on the River Thames occupied by HM Customs and Excise for the collection of flotsam and jetsam and ships which had been seized for contraband activities. It was closed in 1962. It was one of a number of sites known as the King or Queen's Pipe on account of the burning of condemned tobacco and food, illicit books and other contraband on the site.

Writing in the 1930s, A G Linney described its entrance as "an inconspicuous door in an inconspicuous and wholly dismal little street in Rotherhithe".
