= Lapwing (1743 EIC packet) =

History

Great Britain
- Name: Lapwing
- Namesake: Lapwing
- Operator: British East India Company
- Builder: Thomas Bronsdon, Deptford
- Launched: 28 June 1743
- Fate: Sold 1751
- Notes: One of four vessels that Brondson built as fast sailing packets<

General characteristics
- Tons burthen: 260, or 300 (bm)
- Complement: 50
- Armament: 14 guns

Lapwing was one of four fast-sailing packet ships that Thomas Bronsdon of Deptford built for the British East India Company (EIC). She was launched in 1743 and made five trips for the company before the EIC sold her in 1751.

== EIC voyages ==
=== EIC voyage #1 (1743-45) ===
Captain Henry Watts sailed from Plymouth on 16 November 1743 bound for Bengal and Benkulen. Lapwing reached the Cape on 14 February 1744, and Madras on 26 April. On 25 May she arrived at Rogues River, a section of the Hooghly River. On 24 October she was at Calcutta. Outward bound, she was at Rogues River again on 17 November, reaching Benkulen on 9 January 1745. Homeward bound, she reached St Helena on 5 April and Galway on 17 September before arriving at The Downs on 20 December.

=== EIC voyage #2 (1745-46) ===
Captain Francis Cheyne (or Chene) sailed Lapwing to Holland and returned between 18 March 1745 and September 1746.

=== EIC voyage #3 (1746-47) ===
Captain Cheyne sailed Lapwing to Madras and back between 9 November 1746 and 21 November 1747. Lapwing was carrying 25 tons of lead, 50 chests of "treasure" and "a recruit of soldiers.” Around 15 May 1747 Lapwing was to sail from Madras via Sumatra, where she was to deliver 200 bales (likely broadcloth, but type unspecified, hence understood), and pick up a full cargo of pepper.

=== EIC voyage #4 ===
Madras and Bengal. Captain Cheyne sailed from Portsmouth on 24 February 1748, bound for Madras and Bengal. Lapwing reached Fort St. David on 21 June. She delayed her departure for Bengal because of a report of a French squadron of eight vessels in the area. On 26 August she was off Madagascar, but returned to Fort St David on 3 October. She arrived at Calcutta on 27 November. Homeward bound, she was at Ingeli, a point on the west side of the Hooghli Estuary, on 30 December. She reached Fort St David on 9 January 1749 Fort St David, and St Helena on 18 March, before arriving at The Downs on 1 June.

=== EIC voyage #5 (1749-51) ===
Captain Cheyne left The Downs, 6 September 1749, bound for Madras and Bengal. Lapwing reached Fort St David on 17 January 1750. When she arrived she had lost 16 men on the voyage, and the rest of the crew was weak from scurvy. She left on 30 January with 80 chests of her silver, coined into rupees. However, it turned out that at Fort St David the 80 chests of bullion had been coined into 90 chests of "Arcot rupees", but only 80 chests were forwarded to Bengal, ten being improperly retained at Fort St David.

Lapwing arrived at Calcutta on 5 March. Homeward bound, she was at Culpee, an anchorage towards Calcutta, and just below Diamond Harbour, on 17 August. She reached Fort St David on 19 September and St Helena on 5 January 1751, before arriving at The Downs on 7 March.

== Fate ==
The EIC sold Lapwing on 17 April 1751 as being unfit for further service.
