= Lapwing (1762 EIC packet) =

History

Great Britain
- Name: Lapwing
- Namesake: Lapwing
- Operator: British East India Company
- Builder: France
- Launched: 1762
- Fate: Sold 1765

General characteristics
- Tons burthen: 120, or 190(bm)
- Complement: 25, or 30
- Armament: 2 guns + 2 swivel guns, or 10 guns

Lapwing was a packet ship built in France in 1762 that the British East India Company acquired. She made two round-trips to India for the company, with the EIC selling her in 1765 in Bengal on her third voyage.

== EIC voyages ==
=== EIC voyage #1 (1762–63) ===
Captain John Griffin (or Griffen) left Britain on 5 April 1762, bound for Madras. He returned on 12 March 1763.

=== EIC voyage #2 (1763–64) ===
Captain Griffin left Plymouth on Plymouth on 5 April 1763. Lapwing reached Johanna on 22 July, and arrived at Madras on 20 August. Homeward bound, she reached the Cape on 14 November, St Helena on 6 December, and Torbay on 1 February 1764, before arriving at The Downs on 13 February.

=== EIC voyage #3 (1764–65) ===
Captain John Griffin started on 28 March 1764, bound for Bengal, but did not leave Portsmouth until 3 June. By 6 December Lapwing had reached Acheh. On 23 January 1765 she arrived at Ingeli, a point on the west side of the Hooghli Estuary. On 4 April she was at Calcutta. The EIC sold Lapwing there in 1765.
