= Polygamy in Sierra Leone =

Polygamy is prohibited under Sierra Leone’s penal code. Polygamy is authorized in customary marriages (under customary indigenous laws of the various ethnic groups of Africa), where a man can take as many wives as he wishes.

== Prevalence of polygamy ==
As of 2019, 30% of women and 14% of men were in a polygamous union. However, "the percentage of women with one or more co-wives has decreased gradually over time, from 37% in 2008 and 35% in 2013 to 30% in 2019". The most common form of polygamous arrangements consist of one man with two or three wives.

Polygamy is more prevalent in rural than urban areas of Sierra Leone. As of 2019, 36% of rural women have at least one co-wife, compared to 20% of urban women. In addition, 19% of rural men report having two or more wives, compared with 7% of urban men.
