= HMS Lapwing =

Eight ships of the Royal Navy have borne the name HMS Lapwing, after the northern lapwing, a species of bird:

- HMS Lapwing (1764) was a 10-gun cutter launched in 1764 and lost in 1765.
- HMS Lapwing (1785) was a 28-gun sixth rate launched in 1785. She was used on harbour service from 1813 and was broken up in 1828.
- HMS Lapwing (1825) was a 6-gun Cherokee-class packet brig launched in 1825, used as a breakwater from 1845, and sold in 1861.
- HMS Lapwing (1856) was a Vigilant-class wooden screw gunvessel launched in 1856 and sold in 1864.
- HMS Lapwing (1867) was a Plover-class wooden screw gunvessel launched in 1867 and sold in 1885.
- HMS Lapwing (1889) was a Redbreast-class composite screw gunboat launched in 1889 and sold in 1910.
- HMS Lapwing (1911) was an Acheron-class destroyer launched in 1911 and sold for scrapping in 1921.
- HMS Lapwing (U62) was a Black Swan-class sloop launched in 1943 and sunk by a U-boat in 1945.
