= Freetown Central Prison =

Prison in Freetown, Sierra Leone

Coordinates: 8°29′00″N 13°13′59″W

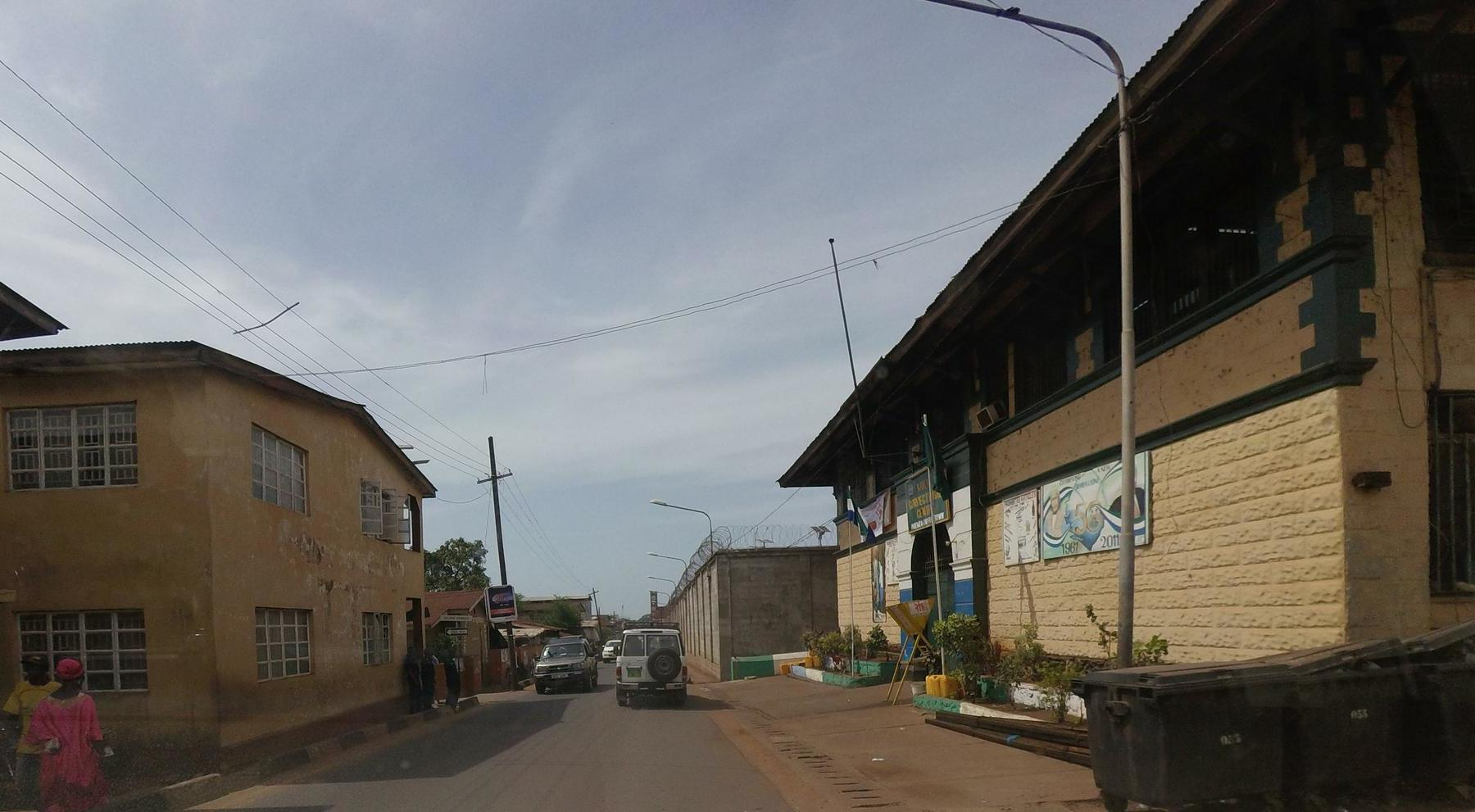
Pademba Road Prison (right)

Freetown Central Prison, commonly known as Pademba Road Prison, is a prison on Pademba Road in Freetown, Sierra Leone. The prison was built to house 220 prisoners in the pre-independence era and now holds around 2,000 prisoners. Many prisoners were subject to prolonged stays in holding cells because of a massive backlog in court cases.

== History ==
Formal incarceration resulting from criminal offences in Sierra Leone began in 1787. At that time, abandoned slave ships were used as makeshift prisons. The first purpose built prison building in the country was built in Freetown, at the location of the current State House, the official residence and principal workplace of the president of Sierra Leone. Some years later, the prison was moved to a new location in the city, which is currently the location of the Connaught Hospital.

The present Freetown Central Prison, located on Pademba Road, was founded on 14 March 1914, by the British colonial authorities.

In 2010, a number of high security prisoners, including those convicted of murder and armed robbery, escaped from the prison, precipitating a manhunt. Prison officers claimed an official figure of 19 escapees, although some eye witnesses claimed the number was 30. The escapees were armed with a pistol, which they fired close to the prison's main gate, causing the guards to flee. They then escaped through the main gate, during the day. National director of jails, Moses Showers, was sacked following the break out and 18 people, including prison officers, were arrested.

In 2013, with the prison population sitting at over 1000, against a design capacity of just 300 inmates, the government initiated proposals to relocate it.
