= Cline Town =

Area within present-day Freetown, Sierra Leone

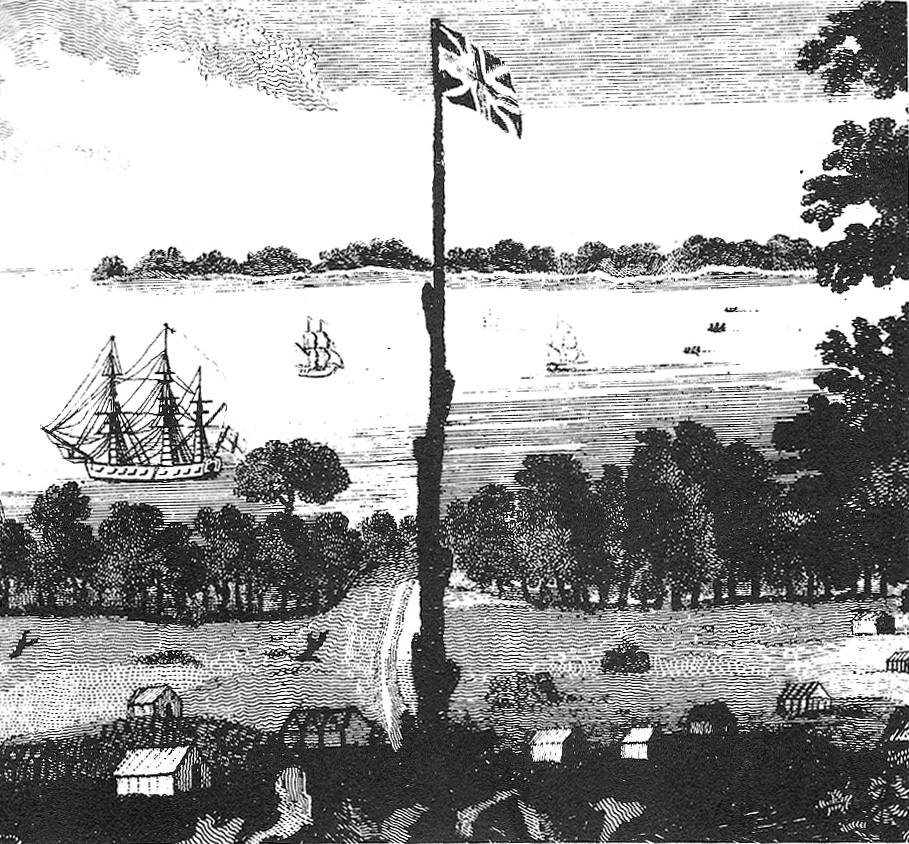
Looking north to Bullom Shore from Voyages to the River Sierra Leone by John Matthews, 1788

Cline Town is an area in Freetown, Sierra Leone. The area is named for Emmanuel Kline, a Hausa Liberated African who bought substantial property in the area. The neighborhood is in the vicinity of Granville Town, a settlement established in 1787 and re-established in 1789 prior to the founding of the Freetown settlement on 11 March 1792.

Granville Town, as Cline Town was known at the time, was established in 1787 by the London-based Committee for the Relief of the Black Poor. They arranged for the transport of London's so-called Black Poor to Sierra Leone where they were amongst its original settlers. Many of these Black Poor were Black Loyalists who had decided or were forced to leave the United States after the American War of Independence; some came via several years in Nova Scotia, another British North American colony and so are known as Black Nova Scotians. All asserted a British identity. Some were formerly West Indian enslaved Africans. Some British wives also were part of the settlement. Granville Town (named for its benefactor and patron Granville Sharp) was established as the first town of the Province of Freedom before it was destroyed in 1789. The town was rebuilt in 1791 with the assistance of Alexander Falconbridge, a former surgeon on a slave ship.

This settlement differed from the Freetown Colony that was established on 11 March 1792 by the Nova Scotian Settlers. Although the Nova Scotians established Freetown in 1792, the Jamaican Maroons were settled in Granville Town in 1800 following their arrival from Nova Scotia. However, by 1800, the settlement had been largely abandoned following attacks by Temne tribesmen of the Koya Empire, and the Maroons were soon after moved to the Freetown settlement where they formed a district that would be known later as Maroon Town. Some Creole families such as the Clarkes and Reeds (Reids) may be descendants of the Old Settlers.
