= Anna Maria Falconbridge =

English travel writer and anti-abolitionist (1769–fl.1820)

- Born: July 1769; Bristol, England
- Spouses: Alexander Falconbridge (m. 1788; died 1792); Isaac DuBois (m. 1793; died 1818)
- Children: 1
- Writing career
- Notable work: Narrative of Two Voyages (1794)

Anna Maria Falconbridge (née Horwood; later DuBois; July 1769 – fl. 1820) was an English travel writer and anti-abolitionist. The first English woman to write and publish travel literature about West Africa, her 1794 work Narrative of Two Voyages defended the slave trade.

== Early life ==
Falconbridge was born Anna Maria Horwood in July 1769 in Bristol to Charles Horwood (died 1787), a watchmaker and goldsmith, and Grace Horwood (née Roberts; died 1774). The youngest of five children, her mother died when she was 4 years old. Her father later remarried and had a number of children, before his death from apoplexy in 1787. Horwood is believed to have received a good education.

On 16 October 1788, despite the disapproval of her friends and family, Horwood married the abolitionist, doctor and former slave ship surgeon Alexander Falconbridge in the village of Easton in Gordano.

== Visits to Africa ==
In 1790, Falconbridge's husband was recruited by the abolitionist Thomas Clarkson to re-establish a colony of free black settlers in Sierra Leone on behalf of George's Bay Company (later renamed the Sierra Leone Company). During Anna Maria's first trip to Africa, she visited a slave-trading fort, Bunce Island, in the Sierra Leone River. It would seem that Anna Maria, came from a family that took part in the slave trade but she was originally sympathetic to the plight of the slaves. Dr Alexander had made 4 slaving voyages as ships' surgeon but became increasingly opposed to the trade. He would not allow his wife to stay with the traders on Bunce Island but insisted she live on a small boat, although Anna Maria accompanied Mr. Falconbridge on some of his visits to the main land. “During her stay Anna Maria observed all she could of the country and its people, their customs, religion, and economy, and wrote about what she saw.”

On Anna Maria's second trip to Africa she travelled with people who had been sent to form a colony, by bringing freed slaves and former Black Loyalists to Britain during the American Revolutionary War to the settlement, in 1791. Falconbridge was appointed commercial agent, leaving his small medical practice for the good salary offered by the Sierra Leone Company (SLC). The settlement was named Freetown. “More than a thousand settlers” came to Freetown, arriving at the start of the rainy season. Hundreds died because there was no shelter for them when they arrived, but Anna Maria kept her health and continued to write, becoming ill for just a short time. Her husband was dismissed by the directors of the Sierra Leone Company just hours before his death, and while his excessive drinking was used as an excuse it would seem that he and others dismissed by the company were used as scapegoats. Other dismissals included Charles Horwood, brother of Anna Maria, and her second husband Isaac DuBois. Alexander died on 19 December 1792 and is believed to be buried in the area of Freetown; the place was not recorded. Her brother William who had accompanied them on the last voyage had died the previous year of "fever" contracted on Bance Island and is most likely buried there also. Falcon Bridge Point was named for Dr Alexander Falconbridge.

Anna Maria remarried within a few weeks of Alexander's death, on 7 January 1793 in Freetown, Sierra Leone, to Isaac DuBois also an employee of the SLC. She returned to London with her new husband in October 1793, where she demanded from the directors of the SLC money she claimed was owed to her late husband. The company denied her claims (paperwork was conveniently lost). Anna Maria published letters denouncing the company. “Three editions of her Narrative of Two Voyages to the River Sierra Leone during the Years 1791–1792–1793 appeared during 1794 and 1795”. The letters that Anna Maria wrote were not originally made to be published. The original purpose of them seems to be for her own personal records of what happened in her travels, such as meeting Temne Prince John Naimbanna.

== Personal life ==
Falconbridge and DuBois had one son Francis Blake DuBois (1802–1876), a curate and slave owner. The family eventually moved to the Virgin Islands.

Falconbridge is last recorded in Saint Croix, in the then Danish West Indies, applying for a widows pension in 1820 following DuBois' death in 1818.

== External sources ==
- Narrative of Two Voyages to the River Sierra Leone, During the Years 1791-1792-1793. Archived from the original on 7 January 2013 – via Questia.
