= Albert Margai =

Sierra Leonean politician (1910–1980)

The Right Honourable Sir Albert Margai

2nd Prime Minister of Sierra Leone
- In office 28 April 1964 – 21 March 1967
- Monarch: Elizabeth II
- Governor-General: Henry Josiah Lightfoot Boston
- Preceded by: Sir Milton Margai
- Succeeded by: Siaka Stevens

Minister of Finance of Sierra Leone
- In office 1962–1964
- Prime Minister: Sir Milton Margai
- Preceded by: Mohammad Sanusi Mustapha
- Succeeded by: Robert Granville Ojumiri King

Minister of Agriculture
- In office 1959–1962

Head of Sierra Leone People's Party
- In office 1957–1957
- Preceded by: Sir Milton Margai
- Succeeded by: Sir Milton Margai

Member of Parliament for Moyamba Moyamba (1957)
- In office 1957–1957

Personal details
- Born: Albert Michael Margai; 10 October 1910 Gbangbatoke, Banta Chiefdom, Moyamba District, British Sierra Leone
- Died: 18 December 1980 (aged 70)
- Party: Sierra Leone People's Party
- Profession: Attorney

Sir Albert Michael Margai (10 October 1910 – 18 December 1980) was the second prime minister of Sierra Leone and the half-brother of Sir Milton Margai, the country's first Prime Minister. He was also the father of Sierra Leonean politician Charles Margai.

== Early life ==
Albert Margai was born in Gbangbatoke, Banta Chiefdom, in what is now the Moyamba District, Freetown. His stepfather, M. E. S. Margai, who gave him the family name Margai, was a wealthy trader from Bonthe. Margai received a Roman Catholic education at St. Edward's Primary School and went on to be one of the first group of students to attend St. Edward's Secondary School.

Margai became a registered nurse and this was his occupation from 1931 to 1944. He later travelled to England and read law at the Inner Temple Inns of Court, where he qualified in 1948. Prior to his political career, he owned a private law practice in Freetown.

== Political career ==
=== Colonial era ===
Margai was elected first Protectorate Member to the Legislative Council in 1951. In 1952 he became a Cabinet Minister and Sierra Leone's first Minister of Education. In 1957 he was elected Member of Parliament for the Moyamba Constituency).

He served as Minister of Finance of Sierra Leone in Milton's government after 1962, where he also held positions alternatively in Education, Agriculture, and Natural Resources. After the death of his brother, Sir Albert served from 1964 until 1967.

==== Sierra Leone National Party ====
Margai was a founding member of the Sierra Leone National Party, which was formed in 1949 to advocate and aid in the transition to independence for the country.

==== Sierra Leone People's Party ====
However, in the years leading up to independence, Margai was allied more closely with Siaka Stevens than his brother. He took leadership of the Sierra Leone People's Party (SLPP) in 1957, but stepped down to form the People's National Party with Stevens. A major point of contention between the two groups involved the degree of involvement of traditional chiefs and traditional rules in the modern state. In fact, Margai openly asked traditional rulers to stay out of politics. He was one of a number of leaders (Kwame Nkrumah in Ghana and Milton Obote in Uganda are other examples) who attempted to remove the system of democratic governance enshrined in multi-party democracy as he believed that this would encourage politicians to accentuate the ethnic differences within the state and therefore threaten the viability of Sierra Leone as a country.

=== Independence ===
The Crown Colony and Protectorate of Sierra Leone was granted political independence on 27 April 1961. Albert's brother, Sir Milton Margai was appointed first Prime Minister of Sierra Leone. At the time, Albert was serving as a member of parliament for Moyamba.

==== Minister of Finance ====
Margai was appointed Minister of Finance of Sierra Leone in 1962. In 1964, Margai changed Sierra Leone's currency from the British West African pound to the leone, a decimal legal tender roughly equivalent to half a pound sterling at the time. He also founded the Bank of Sierra Leone and made it the national central bank.

=== Premiership and public image ===
Sir Albert Margai was made Prime Minister on 29 April 1964.

He was highly criticized during his tenure. He had a penchant for extravagant pageantry and was accused of corruption and of a policy of affirmative action in favor of the Mende tribe. The tantrum-prone Prime Minister was nicknamed "Akpata", a Mende word meaning "our wild, fat man". Margai was also nicknamed "Big Albert" and "African Albert".

Sir Albert Margai to also endeavoured to change Sierra Leone from a democracy to a one-party state.

==== 1967 elections ====
Up until the 1967 elections, Sierra Leone had been an exemplary democratic, post-colonial state. However, the campaign strategies of Margai would forever alter this trend. He was against any candidates from the opposition running against candidates from his own party. Margai refused to dignify accusation of corruption with a response. Riots broke out across Sierra Leone and the government had to declare a state of emergency.

==== Coup d'état ====
Margai's opponent Siaka Stevens achieved a small parliamentary majority and he was sworn in as the third Prime Minister of Sierra Leone by Governor-General Sir Henry Lightfoot Boston. Margai's friend and ally Brigadier David Lansana, who was the Commander of Sierra Leone's Armed Forces at the time, arrested both Stevens and Lightfoot Boston. He declared martial law, dismissed the election results and proclaimed himself the interim Governor-General.

==== Counter coup ====
In April 1968, a group of noncommissioned officers staged a counter coup in an attempt to restore the democratic process to Sierra Leone. The so-called Sergeants' Coup was led by Lieutenant Colonel Ambrose Patrick Genda who Margai had fired in 1967. Eight members of the officers' corps formed the National Reformation Council and elected Brigadier John Bangura as acting Governor-General of Sierra Leone. A staunch democrat, Bangura re-instated Siaka Stevens because he had won the election.

== Civilian life ==
Margai warned: "If the Stevens government does not do something to elevate the lives of the have-nots, the poor, they would one day rise to demand from the haves, the rich, their own share of the economy."

== Death ==
On 18 December 1980, Margai died in his sleep. He is survived by his son, politician Charles Margai.

Preceded by Milton Margai	Prime Minister of Sierra Leone; 1964–1967	Succeeded by Siaka Stevens
