= Kingdom of Koya =

Kingdom in Africa from 1505 to 1896

The Kingdom of Kquoja or Koya or Koya Temne, or the Temne Kingdom (1505–1896), was a pre-colonial African state in the north of present-day Sierra Leone.

The kingdom was founded by the Temne ethnic group in or around 1505 by migrants from the north, seeking trade with the coastal Portuguese in the south.

The kingdom was ruled by a king called a Bai or Obai. The sub-kingdoms within the state were ruled by nobles titled "Gbana". The Koya Kingdom kept and maintained diplomatic relations with the British and French in the 18th century. Children of Temne nobles were allowed to seek western educations abroad. Koya also traded with Islamic states to its north and had Muslims within its borders.

Under Nembanga's reign (1775–1793), the Koya kingdom signed a treaty, which made it possible for the establishment of a British colony on the peninsula of Sierra Leone in 1788.

Koya participated in the trans-atlantic slave trade, though sources state that such commerce was much more privatized than in other kingdoms. Subjects of Koya traded in slaves on the coast even against the wishes of the state at times.

From 1801 to 1807, Koya fought a war with British colonists and the Susu. Koya lost the northern shoreline of Sierra Leone to the British and Port Loko to the Susu. However, they remained a power in the region. In 1815, the Temne fought another war with the Susu and regained the port. In 1841, the Temne defeated the Loko tribe of Kasona on the Mabaole River dispersing many of the people. In response to a British bombardment, the kingdom expelled the Church Missionary Society missionaries operating at Magbela in 1860.

The kingdom became a British protectorate on 31 August 1896 after which the Koya kings lost virtually all power. Revolts of the Temne and Mende in 1898 were fierce but futile. The British would govern the area of the former kingdom until 1961.

== List of Temne monarchs ==
Names and Dates taken from John Stewart's African States and Rulers (Third edition, 2006).

=== Kings ===
| # | Name | Reign dates |
|---|---|---|
| 1 | Farima I | c. 1505 – c. 1550 |
| 2 | Farima II | c. 1550 – c. 1560 |
| 3 | Farima III | c. 1560 – 1605 |
| 4 | Sangrafare (or Pedro) | 1605–1610 |
| 5 | Borea I | 1610–1630 |
| 6 | Borea II | 1630–1664 |
| 7 | Felipe II | 1664–1680 |
| 8 | Naimbanna I | 1680–1720 |
| 9 | Naimbanna II | 1720–1793 |
| 10 | Farima IV | 1793–1807 |
| 11 | Bai Foki | 1807–1817 |
| 12 | Moriba | 1817–1825 |
| 13 | Kunia Banna (or Jack Coby) | 1825–1826 |
| 14 | Fatima | 1826–1840 |
| 15 | Moribu Kindo | 1840–1859 |
| 16 | Bai Kanta (or Alexander) | 1859–1872 |
| - | Alimani Lahai Bundu (Regent) | 1872–1890 |
| 17 | Bai Kompa (or William Rowe) | 1890–1898 |
| 18 | Fula Mansa Gbanka | 1898 |

=== Sub-Kings of Ko-Fransa ===
| # | Name | Reign dates |
|---|---|---|
| 1 | Tom I | 1770–1778 |
| 2 | Jimmy | 1778–1796 |
| 3 | Tom II | 1796–1807 |

== Sources ==
- Worldstatesmen
- Sierra Leonean Heroes
- Wars of the World
- Adam Jones, "The Kquoja Kingdom: A Forest State in Seventeenth Century West Africa," Paideuma 29 (1983): 23–43.
