= Alexander Falconbridge =

English abolitionist, medical doctor and former slave-ship surgeon (c.1760–1792)

- Born: c. 1760
- Died: 19 December 1792; Freetown
- Occupation: Medical doctor
- Spouse: Anna Maria Falconbridge (m. 1788)
- Writing career
- Notable work: An Account of the Slave Trade on the Coast of Africa (1788)

Alexander Falconbridge (c. 1760 – 19 December 1792) was an English abolitionist, medical doctor, writer and former slave-ship surgeon. Following his experience as a slave-ship surgeon, Falconbridge became an abolitionist and published An Account of the Slave Trade on the Coast of Africa in 1788.

== Early life and slave trade ==
Born around 1760, Falconbridge grew up in Bristol. From 1779 to 1780, Falconbridge studied at the Bristol Royal Infirmary with the intention of pursuing a career in medicine. Lacking the resources to establish his own medical practice, Falconbridge became a slave-ship surgeon which, alongside a salary, paid a bounty of a shilling for each slave landed.

Falconbridge made 4 voyages between 1782 and 1787, before rejecting the slave trade and becoming an abolitionist. (Note: On the ships Tartar during 1780 and 1781, the Emilia from 1783 to 1784, the Alexander from 1785 to 1786, and on the Emilia again during 1786 and 1787.)

== Abolitionism ==
Falconbridge gained his experience on slave ships before he met the anti-slavery campaigner Thomas Clarkson following which he became a member of the Anti-Slavery Society. Clarkson was the author of a pamphlet entitled A Summary View of the Slave Trade and of the Probable Consequences of Its Abolition, published in 1787. Clarkson had a high regard for Falconbridge who on more than one occasion acted as his personal armed bodyguard whilst he gathered evidence against the slave trade.

After meeting Clarkson, Falconbridge published in 1788 An Account of the Slave Trade on the Coast of Africa, an influential book in the abolitionist movement. In this book, he talked about the trade from when the ships first acquired captives from the African coast, through their treatment during the Middle Passage, to the time they were sold into hereditary bondage in the West Indies

In 1790 Alexander gave verbal evidence before a House of Commons Committee. Many of them were hostile toward him.

=== Final voyage and death ===
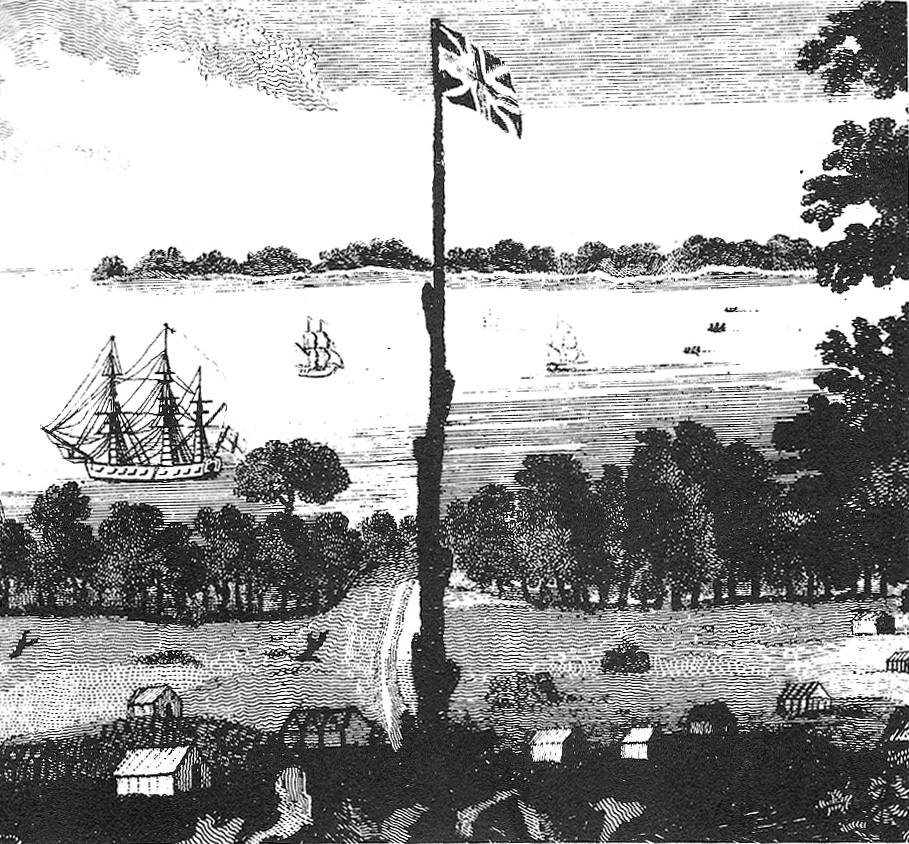
Sierra Leone engraved by John Matthews in 1788

In 1791, Falconbridge was selected by the Anti-Slavery Society to sail to Sierra Leone with his wife Anna Maria; and his brother William, with the intent of reorganising the failed settlement of freed slaves in Granville Town, Sierra Leone. They arrived as passengers on the enslaving ship Duke of Buccleugh. On the voyage out Falconbridge had numerous drunken disputes with Captain John Malean, Duke of Buccleugh's master; Anna Maria would retire to her cabin during these disputes.

Unfortunately, Anna Maria did not share Alexander's idealistic views about the settlement. The couple quarrelled; Falconbridge began to drink excessively, due to marital problems and ailing health and, it would seem, disenchantment with the Sierra Leone Company. A number of Falconbridge's contemporaries were dismissed for vague reasons and it may be that the Company used them as scapegoats. Dismissals included Charles Horwood, brother of Anna Maria, Isaac DuBois (Anna's second husband), and eventually Clarkson himself.

Falconbridge eventually died of drinking a week before Christmas 1792. Henry Thornton, chairman of the Sierra Leone Company, replaced him as the company's commercial agent only hours before his death. The Sierra Leone company refused to acknowledge the claim of his wife Anna Maria for monies owed to her late husband and, perhaps conveniently, the company records went missing.

== Legacy ==
The colony was eventually named Freetown, and it seems likely that Falconbridge Point in Freetown is named after Alexander Falconbridge. Both Alexander and his brother William, who died in Freetown the previous year, are most likely buried in the Freetown area, though the exact location is not recorded.

== See also ==
- John Clarkson (abolitionist)
