= Moyamba =

- Location in Sierra Leone
- Coordinates: 8°09′38″N 12°26′0″W
- Country: Sierra Leone
- Province: Southern Province
- District: Moyamba District
- Chiefdom: Kaiyamba Chiefdom

Population (2015)
  - Total: 10,249
- Time zone: UTC-5 (GMT)

Moyamba is the capital and largest city of Moyamba District, in the Southern Province of Sierra Leone. There has been a recorded population of 10,249 in the 2015 census. The city is ethnically diverse, although the Mende people make up the majority. The city is home to the Hatford Secondary School for Girls, which is one of the elite secondary schools in Sierra Leone. The school attract some of the most gifted students from all parts of Sierra Leone, along with students abroad. The school is an all-girls secondary school, and the students are in a boarding home in the school campus. The city has a history of producing some of Sierra Leone's most prominent politicians, including the country's first president, Siaka Stevens.

== Ethnicity ==
Moyamba is an ethnically diverse city, although the Mende make up the largest population. As with most parts of Sierra Leone, the Krio language of the Sierra Leone Creole people is the most widely spoken language in Moyamba.

== Sport ==
Like the rest of the country, football is the most popular sport in Moyamba. The biggest and most popular club from the city is the Yambatui Stars, which currently plays in Sierra Leone second division.

== Media ==
Radio Modcar 94.8 is the local radio station in the city. SLBS TV and SLBS Radio are broadcast along with Sierra Leone's national radio and television stations in Moyamba.

== Notable people from Moyamba ==
- Sir Milton Margai, lead Sierra Leone to independence and was prime minister from 1962 to 1963
- Sir Albert Margai, prime minister of Sierra Leone from 1964 to 1967
- Siaka Stevens, president of Sierra Leone from 1971 to 1985
- Banja Tejan-Sie, Sierra Leone governor general from 1967 to 1968
- Madam Ella Koblo Gulama, Paramount chief/King of Kaiyamba whose royal capital is Moyamba, prominent Sierra Leonean politician and the first woman to be elected in the parliament and the first woman to be elected as cabinet minister
