= Temne people =

West African ethnic group

Temne
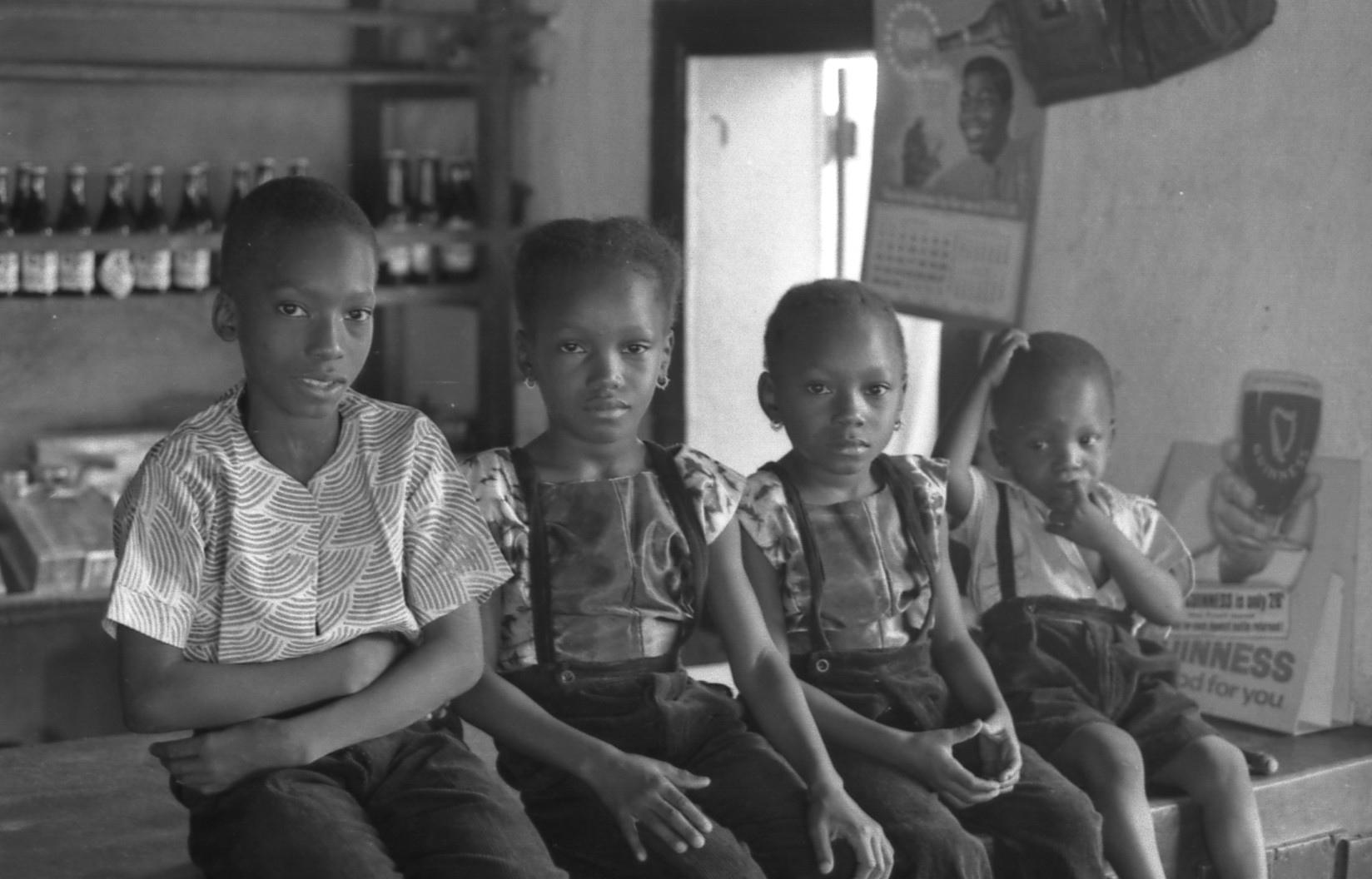
- Temne children in Kabala in 1968

Total population
- 2,425,811

Regions with significant populations
- Sierra Leone: 2,220,211
- Guinea: 200,027

Languages
- Temne, English, Krio

Religion
- Islam 90% • Christianity 10%

Related ethnic groups
- Baga people, Landuma people, Nalu people, Susu people

The Temne, also called Atemne, Témené, Temné, Téminè, Temeni, Thaimne, Themne, Thimni, Timené, Timné, Timmani, or Timni, are a West African ethnic group. They are predominantly found in the Northern Province of Sierra Leone. Some Temne are also found in Guinea. The Temne constitute the second largest ethnic group in Sierra Leone, at 31.4% of the total population, which is slightly lesser than the Mende people at 31.9%. They speak Temne, which belongs to the Mel branch of the Niger–Congo languages.

The Temne people migrated from the Futa Jallon region of Guinea, who left their original settlements to escape Fula jihads in the 15th century, and migrated south before settling between the Kolenté and Rokel River area of Sierra Leone.The Temne people migrated from the Futa Jallon region of Guinea, who left their original settlements to escape Fula jihads in the 15th century, and migrated south before settling between the Kolenté and Rokel River area of Sierra Leone. They initially practiced their traditional religion before Islam was adopted through contact with Muslim traders from neighboring ethnic groups. Though most Temne converted to Islam over time, some have continued with their traditional religion.

The Temne are traditionally farmers, growing rice, cassava, millet and kola nut. Their cash crops include peanuts and tobacco. Some Temne are fishermen, artisans and traders. Temne society is patrilineal. It has featured a decentralized political system with village chiefs and an endogamous hierarchical social stratification. The Temne were one of the ethnic groups that were victims of slave capture and trading across the sub-Saharan region and across the Atlantic into European colonies.

== Demographics and language ==
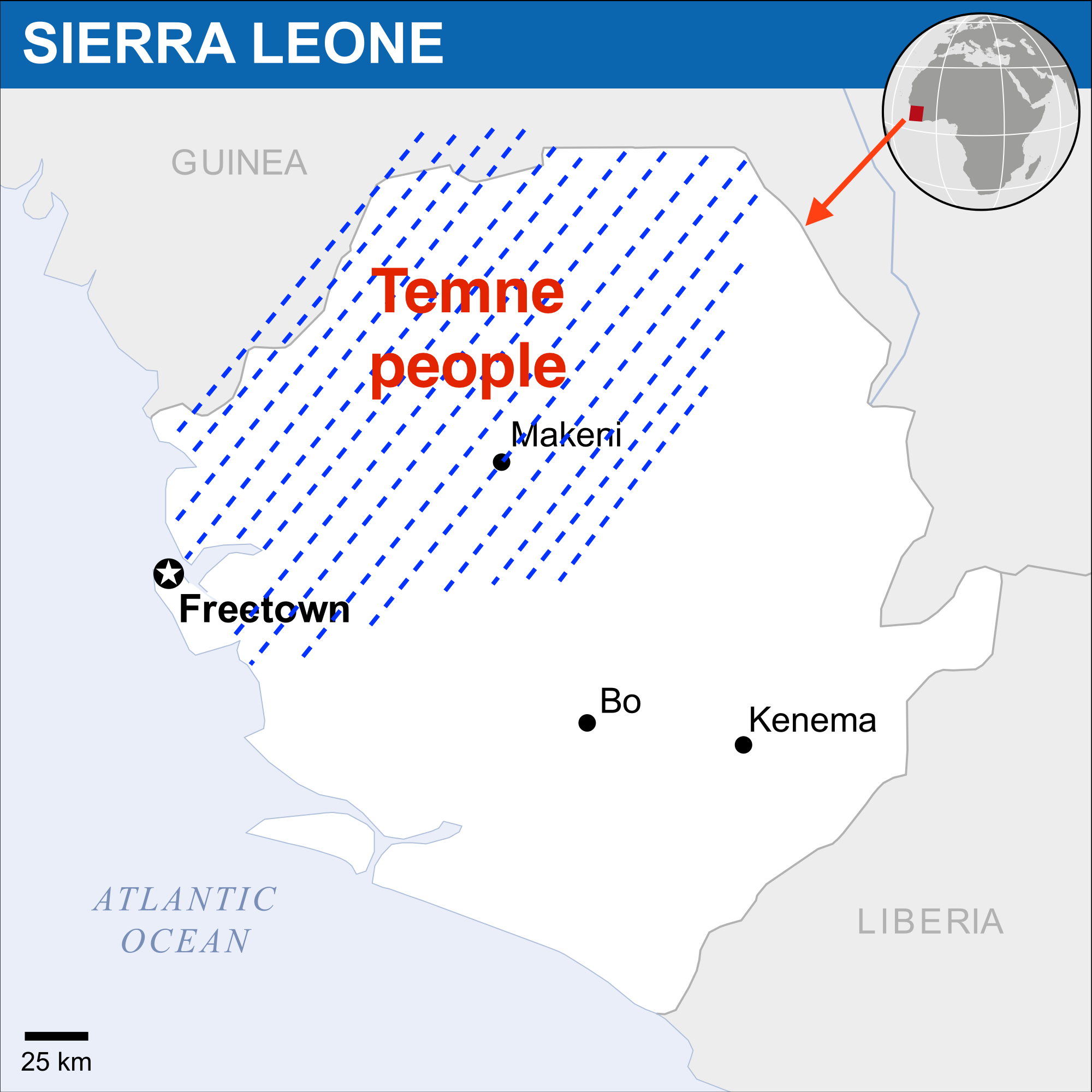
Temne people's approx. geographic concentration in Sierra Leone.

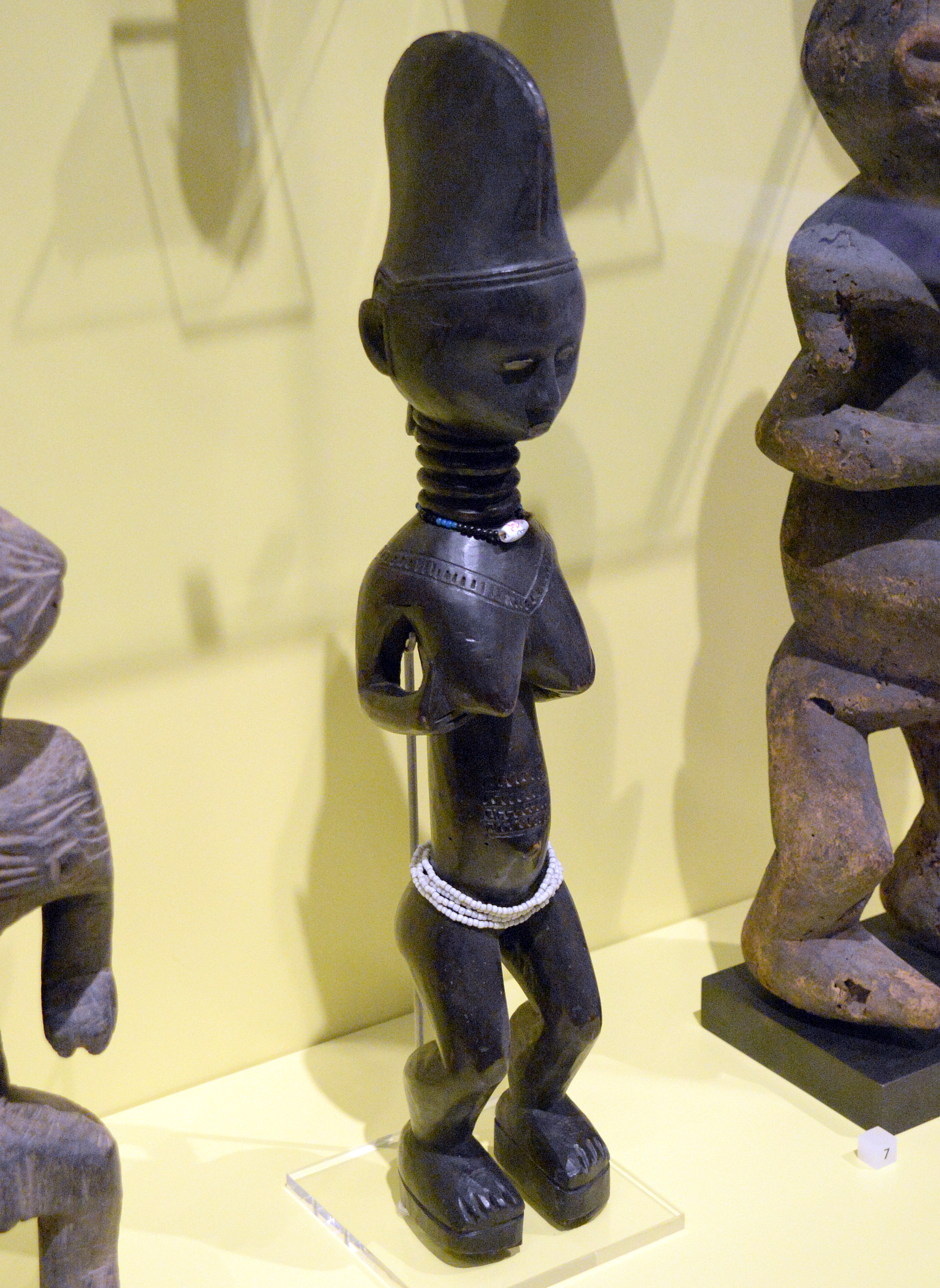
Female figure, probably Temne People, Sierra Leon, early 19th century CE. Sculpture. National Museum of Scotland, Edinburgh

The Temne people constitute one of the largest ethnic groups of Sierra Leone. Their largest concentrations are found in the northwestern and central parts of Sierra Leone, as well as the coastal capital city of Freetown. Although Temne speakers live mostly in the Northern Province, they also can be found in a number of other West African countries as well, including Guinea and The Gambia. Some Temnes have migrated beyond West Africa seeking educational and professional opportunities in countries such as Great Britain, the United States, and Egypt. Temnes are primarily composed of scholars, business people, farmers, and coastal fishermen. Most Temnes are Muslim.

The Temne people speak Temne, a language in the Mel branch of the Niger–Congo languages. It is related to the Baga language spoken in Guinea.

== History ==
In 1642, a Susu caravan of 1,500 people led by Touré, Fofana, Yansané, Youla, and Doumbouya from the North, invaded the city of Forécariah. Directed by Fode Katibi Touré and his brothers Fodé Boubacar Fofana and Fodé Boubacar Yansané, their primary mission was to Islamize the natives of the region who were Temne people. The Temne, who refused to convert to Islam, were ethnically cleansed from their region and forced to migrate to northwest Sierra Leone.

According to Bankole Taylor, the migration of the Temne to present-day Sierra Leone goes as far back as the 11th or 12th century and was mainly due to the fall of the Jallonkadu Empire in present-day Futa Jallon. According to oral tradition, the Temne consider their ancestral home to be the Fouta Djallon highlands in the interior of present-day Guinea. In the 15th century, their region was dominated by Fulani, which further caused a southern migration of the Temne to northwest Sierra Leone. Following their migration, they came into contact with the Limba people. The Temnes fought and forced the Limba northeast and the Bullom southwards. The Limba, according to Alexander Kup, had settled in Sierra Leone at some point before 1400 CE invading land then-inhabited possibly by Gbandi people pushing them eastwards into Liberia.

The Temne started resettling in the northern part of the Pamoronkoh River (today is known as the Rokel River). They followed the Rokel River from its upper reaches to the Sierra Leone River, the giant estuary of the Rokel River, and Port Loko Creek, one of the largest natural harbors in the African continent. This re-settlement remained precarious, as more ethnic groups arrived in the region to escape wars and jihads, and as wars began inside Sierra Leone in the coming years. In the mid 16th century, a Mandé army from the east, referred to as the Mane or Mani, invaded and conquered the Temne lands, with the general Farma Tami becoming the ruler of the Temne. His capital Robaga by the Sierra Leone River, now near Freetown, became holy and an economic center for the Temne. The Mane generals and captains divided Sierra Leone between themselves into four principal "kingdoms", with several subdivisions within each. However, Kenneth C. Wylie states, the "kingdoms" were graftings atop existing local structures which continued to survive and which influenced the newcomers.

Between the 16th and 18th century, several Mandé ethnic groups such as the Koranko, the Susu and the Yalunka also arrived. A Fula ruler styled Fula Mansa seized power south of the Rokel River. Some Temne of the area fled to Banta near the Jong River, and these became known as Mabanta Temne, while the Temne who accepted the Fula Mansa were called Yoni Temne. The precise origins of the Mane remain intensely debated. The Mane would eventually subsume into the Temne and Bullom peoples, in addition to forming the Loko ethnic group.

=== European records ===
The earliest mention of Temne and other ethnic groups of Sierra Leone are in the records of Portuguese financed explorers such as those of Valentim Fernandes and Pacheco Pereira who were traveling along the coast of Africa to find a route to India and China. Pereira's memoirs written between 1505 and 1508 mention Temne words for gold ("tebongo"), water ("'mant 'mancha") and rice ("nack maloo," borrowed from Mandinka). The Portuguese records describe the culture and religion of the Temne people that their ships met as communities living near water, worshippers of idols made of clay, and men having their gods, while women had their own"."

A Portuguese citizen from Cape Verde named André Álvares de Almada wrote an extensive handbook on Sierra Leone in 1594, urging the Portuguese to colonize the region. This handbook also described Temne society and culture in the 16th century. The text mentions villages, their courts of justice, and lawyers who represented different parties while wearing "grotesque masks", with the chief presiding. Culprits convicted of serious crimes, claimed de Almada, were killed or enslaved. He also described the rituals of chief's succession involving goat blood and rice flour, marriage dances, and a funeral involving the burial of the dead within one's house with gold ornaments.

The Dutch and French colonial empires were not interested in Sierra Leone, and left the Temne land to the interests of the Portuguese and the English. The English trader Thomas Corker arrived in 1684 to Royal African Company, starting the presence among the Temne of the influential Caulker family.

The Futa Jallon Jihad of early 18th century caused major sociopolitical upheaval among the Temne, because it triggered slave raids and the sale of war captives into the Transatlantic Slave Trade, plus generated a major influx of Susu and Yalunka people from the north and west. It also marked the rise of the Solima Yalunka kings. The Temne king Naimbana (also spelled Nembgana) of the Kingdom of Koya was hostile to slave trading until his death in 1793. These wars brought European slave traders to the ports of the region to buy slaves from African chiefs and slave merchants, but it also brought the navies of the European colonial powers interested in safeguarding their interests in Sierra Leone.

=== Abolitionists and missionaries ===
The Temne king, Naimbanna II, opposed slave trading but supported other trade and amicable relations with the European powers. He allowed the British to remain in the peninsula which had been ceded to them by his sub-chief, Tom. Naimbana signed the treaty in 1788 giving this land to the colonists. This may have been done unwittingly, since he was illiterate and may not have realized that the British intended to take permanent possession of the territory. Some of his later actions indicate that he was happy with the presence of the colony in his territory. In 1785, he also granted a French officer land on Gambia Island, close to what is now Hastings.

Naimbana provided land and labor to help the newly-freed Black Nova Scotians who founded Freetown in 1792, as a resettlement for former slaves liberated by abolition activists, as well as a center of economic activity between the Europeans and the ethnic groups of Sierra Leone including the Temne people. The French attacked and burned Freetown in September 1794 during the War of the First Coalition. The city was rebuilt by the Black Nova Scotian settlers and by 1798, Freetown had between 300-400 houses with architecture resembling that of the American South with 3–4 feet stone foundations with wooden superstructures. The city grew to be a center of European and African abolitionists in the early 1800s, who sought to detect and stop all slave trading and shipping activity. It is now the capital of Sierra Leone.

After its founding in 1792, Freetown became the site of the settlement of freed slaves from Britain (Black Poor), North America (Black Nova Scotians), the Caribbean (Jamaican Maroons) and large numbers of Liberated Africans rescued from blockaded slave ships by the Royal Naval Squadron. These efforts had been inspired and financed by philanthropic British abolitionists, African-Americans, and Christian missionaries. Over time, 60,000 such Liberated Africans (many of whom were Yoruba, Ibo, Congolese, Ashanti, Bassa, and other West African groups) joined the Maroons and Nova Scotian settlers to claim Freetown as their home. But this fast-growing center of newly resettled men, women, and children was regarded ambivalently by the Temne. Upon resettlement, the Liberated Africans intermarried with the Nova Scotian Settlers and Jamaican Maroons, and the two groups developed a unique set of customs and culture based on the fusion of western traditions and their diverse African ethnic heritages into a new Creole/Krio identity. Freetown also became a center for Christian missionary activity setting up schools and churches from the coastal south. Around the same time, Fouta Djallon had become a popular destination for higher studies and Islamic learning, with sons from several notable families being sent there to study.

=== Colonial era ===
The Temne were a source of timber, groundnuts, palm kernels, palm oil, rubber and other goods which fed the trade between Sierra Leone and the Europe. However, the Temne kingdom of Koya was engaged in regional wars between 1807 and 1888, such as with the Loko, Mende and Susu rulers. The British intervened between the 1830s to 1870s, arranged numerous cease fires to help stabilize the socio-economic situation and trade. The treaties between the different rulers in and around the Temne lands were erratic and intermittent.

The ongoing wars between the various ethnic groups, along with the military action from the north by the Futa Jalon Almamate into the Temne territories, threatened the Sierra Leone-related economic interests of the European colonial powers. The French and the British then intervened militarily, with the French expanding into Guinea in the early 1880s and the British expanding from the south through Freetown. In 1889, the French and the British had brought the region under their effective control, and they negotiated a boundary between the French Guinea and British Sierra Leone. The Temne territories went to the British.

The British colonial government was directly ruling the Temne lands, enforced their anti-slavery laws, and instituted new taxes to finance their local administration in 1894. This included a hut tax, similar to property tax in vogue in England. This tax was to become effective on January 1, 1898. A similar tax had existed in Sierra Leone before 1872, which the British Governor John Pope Hennessy had abolished within the Sierra Leone colony then ceded by the Temne king to the British. The French, too, introduced a similar tax in Guinea, at the same, but required the chiefs to collect it. The new tax by the British reversed their old decision, and they decided to collect the tax directly from the people. This triggered a Temne response that historians call as a rebellion or Hut tax war of 1898.

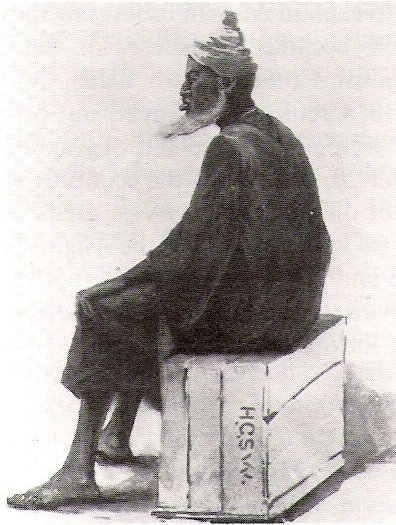
Bai Bureh, a Temne chief who led a war against the colonial Hut tax in 1898.

Between the time Britain announced the tax and it becomes effective, the organized opposition against it grew. Many Temne chiefs told the British that their people would not accept it. These Temne chiefs petitioned Sierra Leone's protectorate governor to repeal it. Still, the British ignored the petition, assumed that the chiefs lacked mutual cooperation for any serious concerted action, and asked their collectors to proceed forward. Further, the British exempted Freetown and their own officials from having to pay an equivalent tax.

By mid-1898, the British assumptions proved wrong, Temne people had refused to pay the new tax and launched a coordinated war. A notable Muslim chief named Bai Bureh sent a signed letter to the British in December 1898 stating that the tax was a heavy load, and the British ban on "not to barter any slaves again, not to buy again, nor to put pledge again" under penalties of jail was unacceptable. The Temne chief's military response against the colonial British in 1898, states Michael Crowder – a professor of History specializing on West Africa, was a protest not just against the hut tax but against a host of laws that had challenged the embedded social systems within the Temne society. Bai Bureh was partly a descendant of the Loko people, became one of the chiefs of Temne people, and led a key role in coordinating the military response to the British. His role in challenging the British laws in his times, and its effect on Temne people, has been widely studied.

After Sierra Leone became independent in 1961, the Temne people and the Mende people have often competed for powers of representation, being the two largest ethnic groups with each representing about 30% to 35% of the nation's population.

== Religion ==
=== Islam ===
Temne originally practiced a traditional polytheistic religion which included belief in a Supreme Being. Following their migration from their ancestral home of Guinea, triggered by invasions from neighboring Fulani in the early 15th century, the Temne resettled in northern Sierra Leone. There the Temne came into renewed contact with Muslims as Islam's influence grew in West Africa. Estimates vary between when Temne began converting to Islam. The 15th-century Portuguese explorers and traders recorded contacts with Muslim peoples. Early traders, warriors and holy men brought Islam into the Temne area by way of other ethnic groups. According to John Shoup, Islam was brought in the 17th century by Mende traders from the south, and according to Rosalind Shaw it was brought beginning in the 18th century, by the Susu from the north and the Mandinka and Fulani from the northeast.

The conversions among Temne to Islam progressed through the 18th and 19th century. In the northern parts of Sierra Leone, close to Futa Djallon, the conversions were near complete, and chiefdoms were Islamic. However, in the southeastern parts of Temne territory (central Sierra Leone), according to Shaw's personal account, the conversion of Temne people have been semi-Islamic where people have syncretized Islam with traditional religious ideas rather than abandoning them outright. These southeastern Temne believe in spirits and divination by believing that their ancestral spirits reside in a transitional region before proceeding to the Islamic idea of an eternal paradise or hell. Those who are literate recite Quranic prayers, others offer the daily prayers required in Islam. Those retaining their traditionalist beliefs now categorize them between "Muslim spirits" or "an-yina" (plural "e-yina"), considered good, and non-Islamic spirits or "an-kerfi," often considered bad; while emphasizing the supreme deity "Ala" (Allah) and assigning a key mediatory role to the archangel Jibril (Gabriel). "Far from reducing Temne concepts, then, Islamisation (in southeastern Temneland at least) has generated further cosmological elaboration", states Shaw.

Precise estimates of Muslims among the Temne alter. Bankole Taylor states an estimated 90% to 95% of Temne people to be Muslims. John Shoup states that "by the early 20th century, the majority was Muslim", while Sundkler and Steed state "most of the Temne people have become Muslim".

=== Christianity ===
Christian missionaries first came to Sierra Leone with the Portuguese in the 17th century. These missionaries wrote that Temne people and their king worshipped idols. The memoirs of Jesuit Barreira state that he had converted and baptized the first group in 1607. According to Vernon Dorjahn, early Christian missions were opposed by Temne elites because it insisted on monogamy, compared to the polygynous households of the Muslim chiefs and landholders. These Temne chiefs also opposed the Christian missionary efforts to end all slave trading, slave exports and resettle the slaves freed from slave ships, plantations and domestic situations.

The early start did not, however, trigger mass conversions. The most significant presence and expansion of Christianity within the Temne territories began in 1787, with the establishment of Freetown. The villages granted by the Temne king for resettlement of freed slaves of all ethnic groups, was modeled to include Christian missions and Churches of various denominations such as Methodist and Baptist. The Church Missionary Society founded in London in 1799, made Freetown as one of its major African bases. The Methodist missionaries from the Wesleyan Missionary Society arrived in Freetown in 1811. These and other missions began proselytizing the newly settled slaves, the Susu people and the Temne people in their neighborhood. The presence of Christianity grew as it opened centers of higher education and model schools for children in the 20th century. Christianity among the Temne has had its largest adherents in the Freetown area and southeastern region of the Temne region.

=== Traditional beliefs ===
Temne traditional religion involves belief in a Supreme Being and Creator referred to as Kuru Masaba, followed in rank by lesser deities. The term Masaba was borrowed from the Mandinka phrase mansa ba which means "the big king". The term Kuru means God, and is cognate with the word kur which suggests "old age", but Kuru also means "sky" or literally "the abode of God". The resulting Kuru Masaba means God Almighty to differentiate it from lesser deities. According to Taylor, the Temne believe that Kuru Masaba cannot be approached directly but only through the intercession of patrilineal ancestral spirits, and sacrifices are offered to them when requesting for help. Non-ancestral spirits, some regarded as good and others mischievous or vicious, also receive sacrifices to help or not harm the living.

Chiefdoms partake in secret societies such as the men's Poro, Ragbenle or Ramena, and the women's Bondo. Like with the introduction of Islam centuries later, this institution of societies was introduced to the region by Mandé peoples. The largest of these societies are the Poro and Bondo which are found in the west, while the smaller Ragbenle is found in the east of Temne territory. According to Kenneth Little, writing in the 60s, even the prevalence of Poro societies was more widespread among Mende than Temne.

These practices include secret initiation ceremonies, which are rites of passage for young boys and girls.

== Society and culture ==
For the Temne, chiefdom is more than just a political position. Chiefs possess a spiritual, sacred force that sets them apart from the members of their community. The sacred nature of the chief is underscored by the fact that Temne represent the chiefdom spirit (kärfi) with a distinct mask. An individual within the community takes on the role of being the chiefdom kärfi’s masquerader, a role called the Sanko. For the life of the chief, the Sanko and the chief appear publicly together and carry the same regalia and honor the same taboos unique to the role of chief.

The Temne are traditionally farmers of staples such as rice and cassava, fishermen, and traders. The cash crops include cotton, peanuts, palm and kola nuts. The Temne clans have been numerous, each independent, divided as a chiefdom. A chiefdom contained villages, with a sub-chief who would head one or more villages. The headman typically inherited the post, being the descendant of the village founder. In contemporary Sierra Leone, the chiefs are elected.

=== Social stratification ===
Some of the Temne people clans have been socially stratified with a stratum of slaves and castes. However, other clans such as the Temne king Naimbana of the Kingdom of Koya was hostile to slave trading until his death in 1793, because his Temne people had been victims to slave raiding and suffered from destroyed families.

Slavery and slave trade thrived in some of the Temne territories, in part because it was well connected to two centers of slave demand and markets, the first being Futa Jallon and Niger valley region, and second being the deepest and largest natural harbor of Africa that forms the coast of Sierra Leone which is also connected to its navigable rivers. The trading of various goods as well as slave raiding, capture, holding and trade between Temne lands and interior West Africa was already in vogue before the first European explorers arrived. Portuguese were already trading gold, ivory, wood, pepper, and slaves by the 17th century, while the British, Dutch and French colonial powers joined this trade later. The slaves were held in Temne clans as agriculture workers and domestic servants, and they formed the lowest subservient layer of the social strata. Enslaved women served as domestic workers, wives and concubines.

Among some clans of the Temne, there were endogamous castes of artisans and musicians. The terminology of this social stratification system and the embedded hierarchy may have been adopted among the Temne from the nearby Mandinka people, Fula people and Susu people. The caste hierarchy and social stratification has been more well established in the northern parts of Temne territories.

== Notable Temne people ==
- Alie Koblo Queen Kabia II, 44th Paramount Chief of Marampa Chiefdom
- Bai Bureh, Sierra Leonean ruler and military strategist who led the Temne uprising against the British in 1898
- Bai Koblo Pathbana II, 43rd Paramount Chief of Marampa Chiefdom
- Ernest Bai Koroma, former president of Sierra Leone from 2007 to 2018
- Foday Sankoh, founder of the Revolutionary United Front who was indicted for war crimes
- Issa Hassan Sesay, convicted war criminal who served in the Sierra Leonean army and the Armed Forces Revolutionary Council (AFRC)
- Isha Sesay, British–Sierra Leonean journalist
- Kadi Sesay, Sierra Leone's Minister of Trade and Industry from 2002 to 2007 and the current National Deputy Chairman of the SLPP
- King Tom, negotiator of the settlement of the Province of Freedom with the British
- Momodu Koroma, Foreign Minister of Sierra Leone from 2002 to 2007
- Momodu Munu, former Sierra Leone minister from 1985 to 1989
- Naimbanna II, 18th century Obai (king) of the Temne people of Sierra Leone
- Thaimu Bangura, former Sierra Leone minister of Finance and leader of the PDP political party
- Zainab Bangura, current Foreign Minister of Sierra Leone
- Brima Bazzy Kamara, former commander of the Armed Forces Revolutionary Council and convicted war criminal
- Soccoh Kabia, Sierra Leone's current Minister of Social Welfare and Children's affairs
- Samura Kamara, former Finance Minister
- Santigie Borbor Kanu, former commander in the Armed Forces Revolutionary Council and convicted war criminal
- Teteh Bangura, Sierra Leonean footballer
- Umaru Bangura, Sierra Leonean footballer
- Alhassan Bangura, Sierra Leonean footballer
- Mohamed Kallon, former professional footballer
- Mohamed Bangura, Sierra Leonean boxer and participant in the 1980 Summer Olympics
- Mohamed Sankoh, professional footballer

== See also ==
- Mende people
- Limba people
- Kono people
