= List of Sierra Leoneans =

This is a list of notable people from Sierra Leone.

== Actors ==
- Idris Elba

== Artists and entertainers ==
- Kadijatu Kebbay

== Business people and entrepreneurs ==
- Kandeh Yumkella

== Educators and academics ==
- Adelaide Casely-Hayford

== Journalists ==
- Hilton Fyle

== Politicians and activists ==
- Okere Adams
- Abdul Karim Koroma
- Abdul Serry-Kamal
- Issa Sesay
- Kadi Sesay
- John Akar
- Shirley Gbujama
- Herbert George-Williams
- Ella Koblo Gulama
- Prince Harding
- Amadu Jalloh
- Andrew Turay
- Edward Turay
- Peter Vandy
- George Banda-Thomas
- Alimamy Pallo Bangura
- John Amadu Bangura
- Zainab Bangura
- Herbert Bankole-Bright
- John Oponjo Benjamin
- Amadu Wurie
- Madam Yoko
- Solomon Berewa
- Julius Maada Bio
- Sam Bockarie
- Tamba Borbor-Sawyer
- Alex Tamba Brima
- Christopher Cole
- Albert Joe Demby
- Abdulai Conteh
- Kandeh Baba Conteh
- Edmund Cowan
- Mohamed B. Daramy
- J. B. Dauda
- Abass Bundu
- Moinina Fofana
- Ahmed Ramadan Dumbuya
- Sheik-Umarr Mikailu Jah
- Abubakarr Jalloh (politician)
- Allieu Kondewa
- Abu Aiah Koroma
- Ernest Bai Koroma
- Johnny Paul Koroma
- Momodu Koroma
- Sorie Ibrahim Koroma
- Augustine Kortuaa

== Sportspeople ==
- Roda Antar
- Brima Bangura
- Hawanatu Bangura
- Eunice Barber
- Albert Cole
- Julius Wobay
- Sarway Dollar
- Horace Dove-Edwin
- Albert Jarrett

== Writers ==
- Ishmael Beah
- Ernest Beoku-Betts
- Aluspah Brewah
- Karamoh Kabba
- Hilton Fyle

== Unsorted ==
- Tom Carew
- John Ezzidio
- Cyril Foray
- Joseph Ganda
- Lamin Jusu Jarka
- Bomba Jawara
- Winstanley Bankole Johnson
- Henry M. Joko-Smart
- Andrew Juxon-Smith
- Haja Afsatu Kabba
- Ahmad Tejan Kabbah
- Patricia Kabbah
- Septimus Kaikai
- Tamba Kaingbanja
- Mohamed Kallon
- Morris Kallon
- Brima Bazzy Kamara
- Mohamed Lamin Kamara
- Samura Kamara
- Samuel Komba Kambo
- Santigie Borbor Kanu
- Yahya Kanu
- John Karefa-Smart
- Ibrahim Kargbo
- Sidney Kargbo
- Allieu Kondewa
- Abu Aiah Koroma
- Ernest Bai Koroma
- Johnny Paul Koroma
- Momodu Koroma
- Sorie Ibrahim Koroma
- Augustine Kortu
- David Lansana
- John Leigh (ambassador)
- Samuel Lewis (Sierra Leone)
- Henry Josiah Lightfoot Boston
- Desmond Luke
- Andrew Lungay
- Albert Margai
- Charles Margai
- Milton Margai
- Tamba Songu M'briwa
- Obi Metzger
- Francis Minah
- Jamil Sahid Mohamed
- Joseph Saidu Momoh
- Momodu Munu
- Namina Forna
- Solomon Musa
- Arthur Nelson-Williams
- Abioseh Nicol
- Tom Nyuma
- Bai Koblo Pathbana II
- Joe Robert Pemagbi
- Patricia Piccinini
- Farid Raymond-Anthony
- Alhaji Shekuba Saccoh
- John Saab
- Samuel Sam-Sumana
- Kabba Samura
- Foday Sankoh
- Lamina Sankoh
- Wusu Sannoh
- Solomon G. Seisay
- Tinga Seisay
- Muwahid Sesay
- Mohamed Sillah
- Siaka Stevens
- Valentine Strasser
- Sheriff Suma
- Jeneba Tarmoh
- John 'Johnny' Taylor
- Banja Tejan-Sie
- John Henry Malamah Thomas
- Bankole Timothy
- Michael Tommy
- Hindolo Trye
- B. J. Tucker
- Isaac Wallace-Johnson
- Madieu Williams
