= List of Sierra Leone members of Parliament =

The Parliament of Sierra Leone is unicameral, with 124 seats. Each of the country's fourteen districts is represented in parliament. 112 members are elected concurrently with the presidential elections; the other 12 seats are filled by paramount chiefs from each of the country's 12 administrative districts. Members of Parliament of Sierra Leone are address as the Honourable.

The incoming members to the Sierra Leone House of Parliament, after the result of the just concluded 2012 Parliamentary elections will be made up of two political parties (with three seats still yet to be decided) with the following representations : the All People's Congress (APC) 67 seats, the Sierra Leone People's Party (SLPP) 42 seats .

Below is a list of the incoming Sierra Leone members of Parliament, based on the final results of the 2012 Sierra Leone Parliamentary elections.

== Eastern Province ==
- Kailahun District:

Name	Party	2012 election results
Alice Foyah	SLPP	Won with 78.25%
Mustapha Brima	SLPP	Won with 72.37%
Sahr Tengbeh	APC	Won with 56.55%
Sahr Fatorma	SLPP	Won with 61.47%
Moiwai Momoh	SLPP	won with 74.42%
Abu Jajua	SLPP	Won with 77.78%
Bu-Buakei Jabbi	SLPP	Won with 86.10%

- Kenema District:

Name	Party	2012 election results
Bockarie Nomolie Salamy	SLPP	Won with 75.60%
Edward Bindi Prince	SLPP	Won with 72.37%
Francis Amara Kaisamba	SLPP	Won with 68.46%
Saidu Mansaray	SLPP	Won with 78.25%
Andrew Victor Lungay	SLPP	won with 79.70%
Bernadette Lahai	SLPP	Won with 69.15%
Francis Amara Konuwa	SLPP	Won with 76.51%
Samuel H Brima	SLPP	Won with 76.91%
Habib Bakarr Munda	SLPP	Won with 82.09%
Lansana Ibrahim Kemokai	SLPP	Won with 78.89%
Alusine Kanneh	SLPP	Won with 90.54%

- Kono District:

Name	Party	2012 election results
Aiah Dabundeh	APC	Won with 53.19%
Tamba Entochema Ebba	APC	Won with 56.88%
Saar Sangbah	APC	Won with 55.15%
Frederick Sandy Sourie	APC	Won with 55.99%
Rosky Momokani Mbayoh	APC	won with 58.20%
Vacant		
Komba E.S. Boyah	SLPP	Won with 51.32%
Komba Eric Koedeyoma	SLPP	Won with 48.05%

== Southern Province ==
- Bo District:

Name	Party	2012 election results
Salieu Monyaba Koroma	SLPP	Won with 74.07%
Foday Rado Yokie	SLPP	Won with 57.35%
Umarr Tarawally	SLPP	Won with 72.60%
Mohamed K Tholley	SLPP	Won with 66.54%
Frank Kposowa	SLPP	won with 80.40%
Bashiru Sidique	SLPP	Won with 75.35%
Jusufu Barry Mansaray	SLPP	Won with 74.13%
Moses Allieu Swaray	SLPP	Won with 72.47%
Helen Kuyembeh	SLPP	Won with 80.55%
Emma Josephine Kowa	SLPP	Won with 91.27%
Alfred Brima Katta	SLPP	Won with 61.77%

- Bonthe District:

Name	Party	2012 election results
Segepoh Solomon Thomas	SLPP	Won with 63.05%
Brima Conteh	SLPP	Won with 73.10%
Moses B Jorkie	SLPP	Won with 75.36%

- Moyamba District:

Name	Party	2012 election results
James N.D Alie	SLPP	Won with 69.03%
Gladys Gbamoh Gbappy-Brima	SLPP	Won with 82.59%
Edward S Jengo	APC	Won with 65.97%
Mima Yema Stephens	SLPP	Won with 66.86%
Veronica Kadie Sesay	SLPP	won with 52.41%
Amadu Mohamed Kanu	APC	Won with 59.40%

- Pujehun District:

Name	Party	2012 election results
Ansumana Jaia Kaikai	SLPP	Won with 60.17%
Dauda D Fawundu	SLPP	Won with 43.28%
Dickson M Rogers	APC	Won with 77.98%
Senesie Fawundu	SLPP	Won with 77.72%
Mohamed Sidie Tunis	SLPP	won with 68.14%

== Northern Province ==
- Bombali District:

Name	Party	2012 election results
Mabinty Kadijah Sillah	APC	Won with 82.18%
Alimamy A Kamara	APC	Won with 88.48%
Vacant		
Ibrahim Martin Bangura	APC	Won with 92.88%
Dan Y Sesay	APC	won with 76.65%
Sulaiman Muluku Sesay	APC	Won with 88.92%
Albert Deen Kamara	APC	Won with 81.63%
Thomus B Turay	APC	Won with 89.05%
Roland Foday Kargbo	APC	Won with 87.40%

- Kambia District:

Name	Party	2012 election results
Patricia Brown	APC	Won with 79.48%
Alieu Baddara Munu	APC	Won with 55.98%
Patrick Lahai M Kargbo	APC	Won with 71.95%
Foday I Sumah	APC	Won with 52.76%
Henneh Raddar	APC	won with 63.18%
Mabinty H Bangura	APC	Won with 81.25%

- Koinadugu District:

Name	Party	2012 election results
Kusan Sesay	APC	Won with 70.59%
Alusine Marah	APC	Won with 84.04%
Lahai Marah	APC	Won with 84.26%
Daniel B Koroma	APC	Won with 80.34%
Mohamed Lamin Mansaray	APC	won with 82.95%
Alhassan Jero Kamara	APC	Won with 63.71%

- Port Loko District:

Name	Party	2012 election results
Alhaji Serray Dumbuya	APC	Won with 82.39%
Isata Kabia	APC	Won with 89.54%
Abi Kaloko	APC	Won with 86.17%
Ibrahim Rassin Bundu	APC	Won with 67.72%
Sheriff B Hassan	APC	won with 77.85%
Nicholas Kamara	APC	Won with 71.58%
Benneh Bangura	APC	Won with 67.97%
Kombor Kamara	APC	Won with 78.02%
Abu Bakarr Koroma	APC	Won with 79.67%
Saidu Babah Kamara	APC	Won with 94.00%

- Tonkolili District:

Name	Party	2012 election results
Hassan Sesay	APC	Won with 89.71%
Mohamed KamarA	APC	Won with 89.56%
Songowa Bundu	APC	Won with 90.16%
Mathew Timbo	APC	Won with 88.28%
Abdulai Sesay	APC	won with 76.56%
Bai Kaloko	APC	Won with 91.73%
Mabinty Funna	APC	Won with 94.47%
Rosemarie Bangura	APC	Won with 61.00%

== Western Area ==
- Western Area Urban District:

Name	Party	2012 election results
Alhassan Kamara	APC	Won with 59.20%
Ibrahim Nox Sankoh	APC	Won with 63.59%
Alimamy G Kargbo	APC	Won with 69.43%
Sheku Badara Bashiru Dumbuya	APC	Won with 60.65%
Abdul Salaam Kanu	APC	won with 62.49%
Alie Kaloko	APC	Won with 72.07%
Rosaline J Smith	APC	Won with 73.38%
Alpha B Lewally	APC	Won with 62.80%
Ibrahim Kamara	APC	Won with 71.07%
Ajibola E Manly Spain	APC	Won with 64.41%
Vacant		
Michel Sho-Sawyer	APC	Won with 66.17%
Michel Sho-Sawyer	APC	Won with 66.17%
Amadu Fofana	APC	Won with 64.72%
Chernor Ramadan Maju Bah	APC	Won with 68.45%
David Johnson	APC	Won with 65.31%
Sheku Sannoh	APC	Won with 56.43%

- Western Area Rural District:

Name	Party	2012 election results
Dauda J B Kallon	APC	Won with 56.22%
Kemokoh Conteh	APC	Won with 69.51%
Claude Daniel Melville Kamanda	APC	Won with 66.51%

- Sources: http://www.nec-sierraleone.org/index_files/Parliamentary_OMP_PCMP%20Result%202012.pdf
