= Bangura =

Bangura is a surname. Notable people with the surname include:

- Abdul Bangura (born 1986), Sierra Leonean football central defender
- Alhassan "Al" Bangura, footballer
- Alex Bangura, footballer
- Alimamy Pallo Bangura, Sierra Leonean politician
- Alpha Bangura, basketball player
- Aminata Adialin Bangura, Sierra Leonean beauty pageant contestant
- Apha Saidu Bangura, Sierra Leonean political commentator
- Barbara Bangura, Sierra Leonean women's rights activist
- Brima Bangura (born 1981), Sierra Leonean football goalkeeper
- Gbassay Bangura (1974–2009), Sierra Leonean football defender
- Gibrilla Bangura, sprinter
- Hawanatu Bangura, Sierra Leonean sprinter
- Isata Dora Bangura, Sierra Leonean educator and politician
- Jimmy Bangura, Sierra Leonean musician, filmmaker, and actor
- John Amadu Bangura, Sierra Leonean politician
- Lamine Bangura (1964/1965–2024), Sierra Leonean football player and manager
- Mabinty Bangura (1995–2024), Sieera Leonean-American ballet dancer
- Marie Esther Bangura, Sierra Leonean beauty pageant contestant
- Mohamed Bangura (footballer)
- Mohamed Bangura (boxer)
- Mustapha Bangura, footballer
- Samuel Lansana Bangura, Sierra Leonean politician
- Shaka Bangura, footballer
- Teteh Bangura, footballer
- Thaimu Bangura, Sierra Leonean politician
- Umaru Bangura, footballer
- Unisa Bangura, footballer
- Wendy Bangura, Sierra Leonean actress, film producer, author, and entrepreneur
- Zainab Bangura, politician and social activist

== See also ==
- Bangora Gas Field, natural gas field in Cumilla, Bangladesh
- Bangura, India, census town in Odisha
- Raees Bangura-Williams (born 2004), English football attacking midfielder
