= Abel Nathaniel Bankole Stronge =

Sierra Leonean politician

Justice Abel Nathaniel Bankole Stronge

Speaker of the Parliament of Sierra Leone
- In office 25 September 2007 – 19 November 2013
- President: Ernest Bai Koroma
- Preceded by: Edmund Cowan
- Succeeded by: Sheku Badara Bashiru Dumbuya

Personal details
- Born: Freetown, Sierra Leone
- Party: All People's Congress (APC)
- Education: Fourah Bay College

Abel Nathaniel Bankole Stronge is a Sierra Leonean politician who was Speaker of the Parliament of Sierra Leone from 2007 through November 2013. He is a member of the ruling All People's Congress (APC) and represents the Western Area Urban District. Bankole Stronge succeeded Edmund Cowan of the Sierra Leone People's Party as speaker of Parliament after the 2007 Sierra Leone Presidential and Legislative elections.

Bankole Stronge was born in Freetown. He is a Christian and a member of the Creole ethnic minority who mostly live in the Western Area of Sierra Leone.
