= Scouting and Guiding in Sierra Leone =

Scouting and Guiding associations in Sierra Leone

The Scout and Guide movement in Sierra Leone is served by:

- The Sierra Leone Girl Guides Association, member of the World Association of Girl Guides and Girl Scouts
- Sierra Leone Scouts Association, member of the World Organization of the Scout Movement
