= Pallo =

Pallo may refer to:

== People ==
- Alimamy Pallo Bangura, politician in Sierra Leone
- Jackie Pallo (1926–2006), English professional wrestler
- Jorge Pallo, American actor
- Pallo Jordan (born 1942), South African politician

== Football clubs ==
- Aseman Pallo (AsPa), Finnish football club based in Aura; see Bertrand Okafor
- Käpylän Pallo (KäPa), Swedish football club from the Käpylä district of Helsinki
- Pallo-Iirot, Finnish football club based in Rauma
- Tampereen Pallo-Veikot (TPV), Finnish football club playing in Tampere
