= WAUA =

WAUA may refer to:

- WAUA-LD, a low-power television station (channel 23) licensed to serve Columbus, Georgia, United States; see List of television stations in Georgia (U.S. state)
- West African Unit of Account
- WAUE, a radio station (100.3 FM) licensed to serve Waverly, Alabama, United States, which held the call sign WAUA from 2015 to 2019
- WVDS, a radio station (89.5 FM) licensed to serve Petersburg, West Virginia, United States, which held the call sign WAUA from 1997 to 2014
