= Mike Lamin =

Sierra Leonean politician

Mike Lamin is a politician in Sierra Leone. He is a member of the Revolutionary United Front and former Minister of Trade, Industry and State Enterprise. Lamin was detained alongside side government ministers Pallo Bangura and Peter Vandy, among others, in 2000.
