= Anandalok Hospital =

- Trust

Geography
- Location: DK-713, Salt Lake City, Sector-2, Kolkata, West Bengal, India
- Coordinates: 22.584919°N 88.423033°E

Organisation
- Type: Multi-specialty

Services
- Emergency department: Yes

Anandalok Hospital is a network of non-profit multi-specialty hospitals based in Kolkata, West Bengal, India. The network operates multiple brances across West Bengal. Provides affordable high quality healthcare treatments to underprivileged. Founded by Mr. Deo Kumar Saraf and now under leadership of his daughter Mrs. Sanyukta Jhajharia.

== History ==
Anandalok group of hospitals was founded by Deo Kumar Saraf. Its first branch was opened in Bangur in 1981. Started from a garage now spread across West Bengal with 8 branches providing all types of healthcare treatments to poor and underprivileged at economically affordable costs.

== Administration ==
The current Secretary is Mr. Saraf’s daughter Mrs. Sanyukta Jhajharia with the same vision of helping the poor and continuing her father’s legacy. Anandalok Hospitals Website
