= Sheku Badara Bashiru Dumbuya =

Speaker of the House of Parliament of Sierra Leone
- In office 21 January 2014 – 2018
- Preceded by: Abel Nathaniel Bankole Stronge
- Succeeded by: Abass Bundu

Majority leader of the House of Parliament of Sierra Leone
- In office 2007–2014
- Succeeded by: Ibrahim Rassin Bundu

Member of the House of Parliament for Constituency 100 in the Western Area Urban District
- In office 2007–2018

Personal details
- Born: November 25, 1945 (age 80) Freetown, British Sierra Leone
- Party: All People's Congress (APC)

Sheku Badara Bashiru Dumbuya (born November 25, 1945), commonly known as S.B.B. Dumbuya, is a Sierra Leonean politician and former Speaker of the House of Parliament of Sierra Leone. A prominent member of the ruling All People's Congress (APC), S.B.B. Dumbuya was elected as Speaker on January 21, 2014 with one hundred parliamentarians voted in his favor, and fifteen parliamentarians voted for his opponent Bu-Buakei Jabbi of the main opposition Sierra Leone People's Party (SLPP). S.B.B. Dumbuya succeeded Abel Nathaniel Bankole Stronge as speaker.

Born and raised in the capital Freetown, S.B.B. Dumbuya was previously the majority leader of the House of Parliament of Sierra Leone. He also served as ambassador to China and other Asian countries. He is an elected representative in the House of Parliament of Constituency 100 in the Freetown's neighbourhood of Kissi in the Western Area Urban District. He was re-elected in a landslide to Parliament in the 2012 Sierra Leone Parliamentary elections with 60.65%, defeating his closest rival Sheka Kanu of the Sierra Leone People's Party (SLPP) who took 30.76%. S.B.B. Dumbuya is a close ally of Sierra Leone's president Ernest Bai Koroma.
