= Hilton Fyle =

Sierra Leonean journalist, author, and musician

Hilton Ebenezer Fyle is a Sierra Leonean journalist, author, and musician.

For more than two decades, he presented BBC Africa's flagship breakfast news programme, Network Africa.

Fyle returned to his native Sierra Leone after retiring from the BBC in the 1990s. He went back in a bid to help establish democracy in the country after years of dictatorship. He founded the Atlantic Broadcast Corporation, a private FM radio station alongside a newspaper, and had several run-ins with the government of President Ahmad Tejan Kabbah at the time.

In 1997, following a military coup in Sierra Leone that overthrew the Kabbah administration, Fyle used his radio station to call for peaceful negotiations instead of foreign military intervention.

In 1998 Fyle was arrested following the restoration of the Kabbah government with the help of regional forces. Fyle was charged with treason for allowing his private radio station to become the mouthpiece of the ousted military junta. He was sentenced to death and kept at the notorious Pademba Road Prison in Freetown. He managed to escape from the prison and now lives in the United States.

== Publication ==
=== Book ===
Fyle, H. (2000) The Fighter from Death Row: Testimony of Survival by a Christian Journalist. Irvine, CA: Universal Publishers.
