= Ecowas Brown Card Insurance Scheme =

Motor insurance system in West Africa

- Type: Motor insurance
- Issued by: ECOWAS
- Purpose: Motor Insurance for non-member motorists
- Valid in: ECOWAS

The Ecowas Brown Card Insurance Scheme is a motor insurance mechanism designed by ECOWAS to guarantee traffic accident victims a fair and accessible compensation for accidents caused by non-resident motorists traveling through the region. It was created in the wake of the African Continental Free Trade Agreement to ensure that vehicles in transit that engage under the premise of free trade and movement are duly insured as they move within the West African sub-region.

== Background ==
The Ecowas Brown Card was signed by Heads of States and Governments in the ECOWAS region on 28 May 1982. It was signed in Cotonou, Benin as Protocol A/P1/5/82 to embody on legal, technical and financial basis, the guarantees of motorists transiting through an ECOWAS state. It is issued through insurers to motorists who sign up for a liability insurance policy for driving in their own countries.

== Accepting Countries ==
These are the ECOWAS member state that issue a brown card with regulation from their respective national bureaux.

- Benin
- Burkina Faso
- Ivory Coast
- Gambie
- Ghana
- Guinea-Bissau
- Guinea
- Liberia
- Mali
- Niger
- Nigeria
- Senegal
- Sierra Leone
  (as at February 2022, Sierra Leone had been suspended from the scheme due to failure to pay contributions)
- Togo

== The Permanent General Secretariat ==
On July 28, 1994, the Ecowas Council of Ministers under the decision C/DEC/7/2/94 created the Permanent General Secretariat to monitor the implementation of Protocol A/P1/5/82. It is headquartered in Togo and led by Mr. Winfred Kwasi Dodzih, who acts as the Permanent Secretary General of the Council of Bureaux of ECOWAS Brown Card Insurance.

The executive committee of the ECOWAS Brown Card Insurance Scheme declared 29 May, as the Ecowas Brown Card Day to raise awareness of the scheme.
