= Treaty of Lagos =

1975 treaty establishing ECOWAS

The Economic Community of West African States (ECOWAS) was created by the Treaty of Lagos on May 28, 1975, in Lagos, Lagos State, Nigeria. ECOWAS was established to promote cooperation and integration in order to create an economic and monetary union for promoting economic growth and development in West Africa.

== State parties ==
Benin
Burkina Faso
Cape Verde (Signed in 1977)
Gambia
Ghana
Guinea-Bissau
Liberia
Mali
Nigeria
Senegal
Sierra Leone
Togo
Guinea – suspended from Community after 2008 coup d'état
Niger – suspended from Community after 2009 auto-coup
Ivory Coast - suspended from Community after 2010 elections
