= Speaker of the House of Parliament of Sierra Leone =

Speaker of the House of Parliament of the Republic of Sierra Leone
- Incumbent; Segepoh Solomon Thomas since 2 May 2024
- Style: The Honourable Speaker
- Appointer: Parliament of Sierra Leone (Elected by)
- Constituting instrument: 1991 Constitution of Sierra Leone
- Formation: 1957
- First holder: Sir Henry Josiah Lightfoot Boston
- Succession: Second in line of presidential succession, after the Vice-President of Sierra Leone

The Speaker of the House of Parliament of Sierra Leone is the presiding officer of Parliament of Sierra Leone. The speaker is the overall leader of Parliament, and is directly elected by sitting members of the House of Parliament of Sierra Leone. Like other members of Parliament, the speaker is addressed as the Honourable.

The Speaker is given the constitutional power to preside over Parliament. Further, they call Members of Parliament into session, and discipline members who break the rules of Parliament. The first Speaker of the Sierra Leonean House of Parliament was the Honourable Sir Henry Josiah Lightfoot Boston who served from 1957 to 1962.

Per the Constitution, the speaker is elected either among MPs who have served for no less than five years, or non-MPs who have been eligible to stand for no less than 10 years, and must be at least 40 years of age.

== List of speakers ==
Name	Took office	Left office	Notes
Sir Henry Josiah Lightfoot Boston	1957	1962	
Sir Banja Tejan-Sie	1962	1967	
Sir Emile Luke	1968	1973	
Justice Percy Davies	1973	1977	
Justice Singer Betts	1977	1986	
William Niaka Stephen Conteh	1986	May 1992	
In abeyance, military junta	May 1992	1996	
Justice Sheku Mohamed Fadril Kutubu	1996	May 1997	
Hon.Umaro S Timbo	May 1997	February 1998	
Justice Sheku Mohamed Fadril Kutubu	February 1998	2000	
Justice Edmund Cowan	2000	2007	
Justice Abel Nathaniel Bankole Stronge	25 September 2007	19 November 2013	
Sheku Badara Bashiru Dumbuya	19 November 2013	2018	
Abass Bundu	25 April 2018	2 May 2024	
Segepoh Solomon Thomas	2 May 2024	Incumbent	
