= Émile F. Luke =

Sierra Leonean jurist

Sir Émile F. Luke

Speaker of the House of Parliament of Sierra Leone
- In office 1968–1973
- Preceded by: Banja Tejan-Sie
- Succeeded by: Percy Davies

Personal details
- Born: Emile Fashole-Luke; 1895
- Died: 1980 (aged 84–85)
- Profession: jurist, Justice

Sir Emile Fashole-Luke KBE (1895–1980) was a Sierra Leonean jurist of Creole ethnicity and former acting Chief Justice and Speaker of the House of Parliament of Sierra Leone from 1968 to 1973. He retired in 1973.

He also served as the Chief Scout of the Sierra Leone Scouts Association.

In 1971, Luke was awarded the 68th Bronze Wolf, the only distinction of the World Organization of the Scout Movement, awarded by the World Scout Committee for exceptional services to world Scouting.
