= List of foreign ministers in 1995 =

This is a list of foreign ministers in 1995.

== Africa ==
- Algeria - Mohamed Salah Dembri (1993-1996)
- Angola - Venâncio da Silva Moura (1992-1999)
- Benin -
  1. Robert Dossou (1993-1995)
  2. Edgar Yves Monnou (1995-1996)
- Botswana - Mompati Merafhe (1994-2008)
- Burkina Faso - Ablassé Ouedraogo (1994-1999)
- Burundi -
  1. Jean-Marie Ngendahayo (1993-1995)
  2. Paul Munyembari (1995)
  3. Vénérand Bakevyumusaya (1995-1996)
- Cameroon - Ferdinand Oyono (1992-1997)
- Cape Verde -
  1. Manuel Casimiro de Jesus Chantre (1993-1995)
  2. José Tomás Veiga (1995-1996)
- Central African Republic - Simon Bedaya-Ngaro (1993-1996)
- Chad - Ahmat Abderahmane Haggar (1994-1996)
- Comoros -
  1. Said Mohamed Sagaf (1994-1995)
  2. Mohamed Abdoulwahab (1995)
  3. Abdallah Mouzaoir (1995-1996)
- Congo -
  1. Benjamin Bounkoulou (1992-1995)
  2. Arsène Tsaty-Boungou (1995-1997)
- Côte d'Ivoire - Amara Essy (1990-2000)
- Djibouti -
  1. Mohamed Bolock Abdou (1993-1995)
  2. Mohamed Moussa Chehem (1995-1999)
- Egypt - Amr Moussa (1991-2001)
- Equatorial Guinea - Miguel Oyono Ndong Mifumu (1993-1999)
- Eritrea - Petros Solomon (1994-1997)
- Ethiopia - Seyoum Mesfin (1991-2010)
- Gabon - Casimir Oyé-Mba (1994-1999)
- The Gambia -
  1. Bolong Sonko (1994-1995)
  2. Baboucarr-Blaise Jagne (1995-1997)
- Ghana - Obed Asamoah (1981-1997)
- Guinea - Kozo Zoumanigui (1994-1996)
- Guinea-Bissau -
  1. Bernardino Cardoso (1992-1995)
  2. Ansumane Mané (1995-1996)
- Kenya - Kalonzo Musyoka (1993-1998)
- Lesotho -
  1. Molapo Qhobela (1994-1995)
  2. Mpho Malie (1995)
  3. Kelebone Maope (1995-1998)
- Liberia -
  1. Dorothy Musuleng-Cooper (1994-1995)
  2. Momolu Sirleaf (1995-1996)
- Libya - Umar Mustafa al-Muntasir (1992-2000)
- Madagascar - Jacques Sylla (1993-1996)
- Malawi - Edward Bwanali (1994-1996)
- Mali - Dioncounda Traoré (1994-1997)
- Mauritania - Mohamed Salem Ould Lekhal (1994-1996)
- Mauritius -
  1. Ramduthsing Jaddoo (1994-1995)
  2. Paul Bérenger (1995-1997)
- Morocco - Abdellatif Filali (1985-1999)
  - Western Sahara -
    1. Mohamed Salem Ould Salek (1988-1995)
    2. Malainine Sadik (1995-1997)
- Mozambique - Leonardo Simão (1994-2005)
- Namibia - Theo-Ben Gurirab (1990-2002)
- Niger -
  1. Abdourahmane Hama (1993-1995)
  2. Mohamed Bazoum (1995-1996)
- Nigeria -
  1. Baba Gana Kingibe (1993-1995)
  2. Tom Ikimi (1995-1998)
- Rwanda - Anastase Gasana (1994-1999)
- São Tomé and Príncipe - Guilherme Posser da Costa (1994-1996)
- Senegal - Moustapha Niasse (1993-1998)
- Seychelles - Danielle de St. Jorre (1989-1997)
- Sierra Leone -
  1. Abass Bundu (1994-1995)
  2. Alusine Fofanah (1995-1996)
- Somalia - no central government
  - Somaliland - ?
- South Africa - Alfred Baphethuxolo Nzo (1994-1999)
- Sudan -
  1. Hussein Suleiman Abu Saleh (1993-1995)
  2. Ali Osman Taha (1995-1998)
- Swaziland -
  1. Solomon Dlamini (1993-1995)
  2. Arthur Khoza (1995-1998)
- Tanzania -
  1. Joseph Rwegasira (1993-1995)
  2. Jakaya Kikwete (1995-2006)
- Togo -
  1. Boumbéra Alassounouma (1994-1995)
  2. Barry Moussa Barqué (1995-1996)
- Tunisia - Habib Ben Yahia (1991-1997)
- Uganda - Ruhakana Rugunda (1994-1996)
- Zaire -
  1. Lunda Bululu (1994-1995)
  2. Gérard Kamanda Wa Kamanda (1995-1996)
- Zambia -
  1. Remmy Mushota (1994-1995)
  2. Christon Tembo (1995-1996)
- Zimbabwe -
  1. Nathan Shamuyarira (1987-1995)
  2. Stan Mudenge (1995-2005)

== Asia ==
- Afghanistan - Najibullah Lafraie (1994-1996)
- Armenia - Vahan Papasyan (1993-1996)
- Azerbaijan - Hasan Hasanov (1993-1998)
  - Nagorno-Karabakh - Arkadi Ghukasyan (1993-1997)
- Bahrain - Sheikh Muhammad ibn Mubarak ibn Hamad Al Khalifah (1971-2005)
- Bangladesh - A.S.M. Mostafizur Rahman (1991-1996)
- Bhutan - Dawa Tsering (1972-1998)
- Brunei - Pengiran Muda Mohamed Bolkiah (1984–2015)
- Cambodia - Ung Huot (1994-1998)
- China - Qian Qichen (1988-1998)
- Georgia -
  1. Aleksandre Chikvaidze (1992-1995)
  2. Irakli Menagarishvili (1995-2003)
  - Abkhazia - Leonid Lakerbaia (1995-1996)
- India -
  1. Dinesh Singh (1993-1995)
  2. Pranab Mukherjee (1995-1996)
- Indonesia - Ali Alatas (1988-1999)
- Iran - Ali Akbar Velayati (1981-1997)
- Iraq - Muhammad Saeed al-Sahhaf (1992-2001)
- Israel -
  1. Shimon Peres (1992-1995)
  2. Yossi Beilin (1995)
  3. Ehud Barak (1995-1996)
- Japan - Yōhei Kōno (1994-1996)
- Jordan -
  1. Abdelsalam al-Majali (1994-1995)
  2. Abdul Karim al-Kabariti (1995-1997)
- Kazakhstan - Kassym-Jomart Tokayev (1994-1999)
- North Korea - Kim Yong-nam (1983-1998)
- South Korea - Gong Ro-myeong (1994-1996)
- Kuwait - Sheikh Sabah Al-Ahmad Al-Jaber Al-Sabah (1978-2003)
- Kyrgyzstan - Roza Otunbayeva (1994-1997)
- Laos - Somsavat Lengsavad (1993-2006)
- Lebanon - Farès Boueiz (1992-1998)
- Malaysia - Abdullah Ahmad Badawi (1991-1999)
- Maldives - Fathulla Jameel (1978-2005)
- Mongolia - Tserenpiliyn Gombosüren (1988-1996)
- Myanmar - Ohn Gyaw (1991-1998)
- Nepal -
  1. Madhav Kumar Nepal (1994-1995)
  2. Prakash Chandra Lohani (1995-1997)
- Oman - Yusuf bin Alawi bin Abdullah (1982–2020)
- Pakistan - Aseff Ahmad Ali (1993-1996)
- Philippines -
  1. Roberto Romulo (1992-1995)
  2. Domingo Siazon, Jr. (1995-2001)
- Qatar - Sheikh Hamad bin Jassim bin Jaber Al Thani (1992-2013)
- Saudi Arabia - Prince Saud bin Faisal bin Abdulaziz Al Saud (1975–2015)
- Singapore - S. Jayakumar (1994-2004)
- Sri Lanka - Lakshman Kadirgamar (1994-2001)
- Syria - Farouk al-Sharaa (1984-2006)
- Taiwan - Fredrick Chien (1990-1996)
- Tajikistan - Talbak Nazarov (1994-2006)
- Thailand -
  1. Thaksin Shinawatra (1994-1995)
  2. Krasae Chanawongse (1995)
  3. Kasem S. Kasemsri (1995-1996)
- Turkey -
  1. Murat Karayalçın (1994-1995)
  2. Erdal İnönü (1995)
  3. Coşkun Kırca (1995)
  4. Deniz Baykal (1995-1996)
- Turkmenistan - Boris Şyhmyradow (1995-2000)
- United Arab Emirates - Rashid Abdullah Al Nuaimi (1980-2006)
- Uzbekistan - Abdulaziz Komilov (1994-2003)
- Vietnam - Nguyễn Mạnh Cầm (1991-2000)
- Yemen - Abd al-Karim al-Iryani (1994-1998)

== Australia and Oceania ==
- Australia - Gareth Evans (1988-1996)
- Fiji - Filipe Bole (1994-1997)
- Kiribati - Teburoro Tito (1994-2003)
- Marshall Islands - Phillip H. Muller (1994-2000)
- Micronesia - Resio S. Moses (1991-1996)
- Nauru -
  1. Bernard Dowiyogo (1989-1995)
  2. Lagumot Harris (1995-1996)
- New Zealand - Don McKinnon (1990-1999)
  - Cook Islands - Inatio Akaruru (1989-1999)
- Palau - Andres Uherbelau (1994-1996)
- Papua New Guinea - Sir Julius Chan (1994-1996)
- Solomon Islands -
  1. Francis Saemala (1994-1995)
  2. Danny Philip (1995-1996)
- Tonga - Prince Tupouto'a Tungi (1979-1998)
- Tuvalu - Kamuta Latasi (1993-1996)
- Vanuatu -
  1. Maxime Carlot Korman (1993-1995)
  2. Alfred Maseng (1995-1996)
- Western Samoa - Tofilau Eti Alesana (1988-1998)

== Europe ==
- Albania - Alfred Serreqi (1992-1996)
- Andorra - Manuel Mas Ribó (1994-1997)
- Austria -
  1. Alois Mock (1987-1995)
  2. Wolfgang Schüssel (1995-2000)
- Belarus - Uladzimir Syanko (1994-1997)
- Belgium -
  1. Frank Vandenbroucke (1994-1995)
  2. Erik Derycke (1995-1999)
  - Brussels-Capital Region - Jos Chabert (1989-1999)
  - Flanders - Luc Van den Brande (1992-1999)
  - Wallonia -
    1. Robert Collignon (1994-1995)
    2. Jean-Pierre Grafé (1995-1996)
- Bosnia and Herzegovina -
  1. Irfan Ljubijankić (1993-1995)
  2. Muhamed Sacirbey (1995-1996)
  - Republika Srpska - Aleksa Buha (1992-1998)
- Bulgaria -
  1. Stanislav Daskalov (1993-1995)
  2. Georgi Pirinski, Jr. (1995-1996)
- Croatia - Mate Granić (1993-2000)
- Cyprus - Alekos Michaelides (1993-1997)
  - Northern Cyprus - Atay Ahmet Raşit (1994-1996)
- Czech Republic - Josef Zieleniec (1992-1997)
- Denmark - Niels Helveg Petersen (1993-2000)
- Estonia -
  1. Jüri Luik (1994-1995)
  2. Riivo Sinijärv (1995)
  3. Siim Kallas (1995-1996)
- Finland -
  1. Heikki Haavisto (1993-1995)
  2. Paavo Rantanen (1995)
  3. Tarja Halonen (1995-2000)
- France -
  1. Alain Juppé (1993-1995)
  2. Hervé de Charette (1995-1997)
- Germany - Klaus Kinkel (1992-1998)
- Greece - Karolos Papoulias (1993-1996)
- Hungary - László Kovács (1994-1998)
- Iceland -
  1. Jón Baldvin Hannibalsson (1988-1995)
  2. Halldór Ásgrímsson (1995-2004)
- Ireland - Dick Spring (1994-1997)
- Italy -
  1. Antonio Martino (1994-1995)
  2. Susanna Agnelli (1995-1996)
- Latvia - Valdis Birkavs (1994-1999)
- Liechtenstein - Andrea Willi (1993-2001)
- Lithuania - Povilas Gylys (1992-1996)
- Luxembourg - Jacques Poos (1984-1999)
- Republic of Macedonia - Stevo Crvenkovski (1993-1996)
- Malta - Guido de Marco (1989-1996)
- Moldova - Mihai Popov (1994-1997)
- Netherlands - Hans van Mierlo (1994-1998)
- Norway - Bjørn Tore Godal (1994-1997)
- Poland -
  1. Andrzej Olechowski (1993-1995)
  2. Władysław Bartoszewski (1995)
  3. Dariusz Rosati (1995-1997)
- Portugal -
  1. José Manuel Barroso (1992-1995)
  2. Jaime Gama (1995-2002)
- Romania - Teodor Meleşcanu (1992-1996)
- Russia - Andrey Kozyrev (1990-1996)
  - Chechnya - Shamseddin Yusef (1992-1996)
- San Marino - Gabriele Gatti (1986-2002)
- Slovakia - Juraj Schenk (1994-1996)
- Slovenia - Zoran Thaler (1995-1996)
- Spain -
  1. Javier Solana (1992-1995)
  2. Carlos Westendorp (1995-1996)
- Sweden - Lena Hjelm-Wallén (1994-1998)
- Switzerland - Flavio Cotti (1993-1999)
- Ukraine - Hennadiy Udovenko (1994-1998)
- United Kingdom -
  1. Douglas Hurd (1989-1995)
  2. Malcolm Rifkind (1995-1997)
- Vatican City - Archbishop Jean-Louis Tauran (1990-2003)
- Yugoslavia -
  1. Vladislav Jovanović (1993-1995)
  2. Milan Milutinović (1995-1998)
  - Montenegro -
    1. Miodrag Lekić (1992-1995)
    2. Janko Jeknić (1995-1997)

== North America and the Caribbean ==
- Antigua and Barbuda - Lester Bird (1991-2004)
- The Bahamas - Janet Bostwick (1994-2002)
- Barbados - Billie Miller (1994-2008)
- Belize - Dean Barrow (1993-1998)
- Canada - André Ouellet (1993-1996)
  - Quebec - Bernard Landry (1994-1996)
- Costa Rica - Fernando Naranjo Villalobos (1994-1998)
- Cuba - Roberto Robaina (1993-1999)
- Dominica -
  1. Brian George Keith Alleyne (1990-1995)
  2. Edison James (1995-1998)
- Dominican Republic - Carlos Morales Troncoso (1994-1996)
- El Salvador -
  1. Óscar Alfredo Santamaria (1994-1995)
  2. Ramón Ernesto González Giner (1995-1999)
- Grenada -
  1. Nicholas Brathwaite (1992-1995)
  2. Dennis Noel (1995)
  3. Keith Mitchell (1995-1997)
- Guatemala -
  1. Gladys Maritza Ruiz de Vielman (1994-1995)
  2. Alejandro Maldonado Aguirre (1995-1996)
- Haiti -
  1. Claudette Werleigh (1993-1995)
  2. Fritz Longchamp (1995-2001)
- Honduras -
  1. Ernesto Paz Aguilar (1994-1995)
  2. Delmer Urbizo Panting (1995-1998)
- Jamaica -
  1. Paul Robertson (1993-1995)
  2. Seymour Mullings (1995-2000)
- Mexico - José Ángel Gurría (1994-1998)
- Nicaragua - Ernesto Leal (1992-1997)
- Panama - Gabriel Lewis Galindo (1994-1996)
- Puerto Rico –
  1. Baltasar Corrada del Río (1993–1995)
  2. Norma Burgos (1995–1999)
- Saint Kitts and Nevis -
  1. Kennedy Simmonds (1983-1995)
  2. Denzil Douglas (1995-2000)
- Saint Lucia - George Mallet (1992-1996)
- Saint Vincent and the Grenadines - Alpian Allen (1994-1998)
- Trinidad and Tobago -
  1. Ralph Maraj (1991-1995)
  2. Knowlson Gift (1995)
  3. Gordon Draper (1995)
  4. Ralph Maraj (1995-2000)
- United States - Warren Christopher (1993-1997)

== South America ==
- Argentina - Guido di Tella (1991-1999)
- Bolivia - Antonio Araníbar Quiroga (1993-1997)
- Brazil -
  1. Celso Amorim (1993-1995)
  2. Luiz Felipe Palmeira Lampreia (1995-2001)
- Chile - José Miguel Insulza (1994-1999)
- Colombia - Rodrigo Pardo García-Peña (1994-1996)
- Ecuador - Galo Leoro Franco (1994-1997)
- Guyana - Clement Rohee (1992-2001)
- Paraguay - Luis María Ramírez Boettner (1993-1996)
- Peru -
  1. Efrain Goldenberg (1993-1995)
  2. Francisco Tudela (1995-1997)
- Suriname - Subhas Mungra (1991-1996)
- Uruguay -
  1. Sergio Abreu Bonilla (1993-1995)
  2. Álvaro Ramos Trigo (1995-1998)
- Venezuela - Miguel Ángel Burelli Rivas (1994-1999)
