= ECOWAS =

Formation of international cooperation among African States

Economic Community of West African States
(in other official languages)
| French | Communauté économique des États de l'Afrique de l'Ouest |
| Portuguese | Comunidade Económica dos Estados da África Ocidental |
- Flag Emblem

- Member states Suspended states
- Headquarters: Abuja, Nigeria 9°2′31″N 7°31′30″E
- Official languages: English; French; Portuguese
- Member states: 12 members: Benin; Cape Verde; Gambia; Ghana; Guinea; Guinea-Bissau (suspended); Ivory Coast; Liberia; Nigeria; Senegal; Sierra Leone; Togo; Former members: Burkina Faso; Mali; Mauritania; Niger

Leaders
  - Chairman: Julius Maada Bio
  - President of the Commission: Omar Touray
  - Speaker of the Parliament: Moustapha Cissé Lô
- Establishment: 28 May 1975
  - Treaty of Lagos: 28 May 1975
  - Treaty Revision: 24 July 1993

Area
  - Total: 2,336,438 km^{2} (902,104 sq mi) (12th)

Population
  - 2026 estimate: ▲358.86 million (3rd)
  - Density: 153.5/km^{2} (397.6/sq mi)
- GDP (PPP): 2026 estimate
  - Total: ▲$3.413 trillion (15th)
  - Per capita: ▲$9,517 (134th)
- GDP (nominal): 2026 estimate
  - Total: ▲$789.34 billion (22nd)
  - Per capita: ▲$2,201 (154th)
- HDI (2023): ▲0.545 low (154)
- Currency: Eco (currency) proposed; (Cape Verde) Cape Verdean escudo (CVE); (Ghana) Ghanaian cedi (GHS); (The Gambia) Gambian dalasi (GMD); (Guinea) Guinean franc (GNF); (Liberia) Liberian dollar (LRD); (Nigeria) Nigerian naira (NGN); (Sierra Leone) Sierra Leonean leone (SLL); (Benin) (Guinea-Bissau) (Ivory Coast) (Senegal) (Togo); West African CFA franc (XOF); West African Unit of Account (WAUA)
- Time zone: UTC-1 to +1
- Website www.ecowas.int

The Economic Community of West African States (ECOWAS; also known as CEDEAO in French and Portuguese) is a regional political and economic union of twelve countries of West Africa. Collectively, the present and former members comprise an area of 5,114,162 km^{2} (1,974,589 sq mi) and have an estimated population of over 424.34 million.

Considered one of the pillar regional blocs of the continent-wide African Economic Community (AEC), the stated goal of ECOWAS is to achieve "collective self-sufficiency" for its member states by creating a single large trade bloc by building a full economic and trading union. Additionally, ECOWAS aims to raise living standards and promote economic development. The union was established on 28 May 1975, with the signing of the Treaty of Lagos, with its stated mission to promote economic integration across the region. A revised version of the treaty was agreed and signed on 24 July 1993 in Cotonou, the largest city in Benin.

ECOWAS's published principles include equality and inter-dependence of member states, solidarity, self-reliance, cooperation and harmonization of policies, nonaggression, promotion of human rights, economic and social justice, and democratic governance.

Notably among ECOWAS's protocols and plans are the ECOWAS Free Movement of Persons, Residences and Establishment Protocol and the Ecotour Action Plan 2019–2029. The Free Movement of Persons Protocol permits citizens the right to enter and reside in any member state's territory, and the Ecotour Action Plan aims to develop and integrate the tourist industry of each member state.

ECOWAS also serves as a peacekeeping force in the region, with member states occasionally sending joint military forces to intervene in the bloc's member countries at times of political instability and unrest.

In 2024, the military governments of Niger, Burkina Faso, and Mali jointly announced their withdrawal from the bloc, after having been suspended following respective military takeovers in these countries. The withdrawal took effect on 29 January 2025. The three later went on to form the Alliance of Sahel States, with the end goal of establishing a federation.

== Member states ==
ECOWAS currently has 12 member states: five French-speaking, five English-speaking, and two Portuguese-speaking. All current members joined the community as founding members in May 1975, except Cape Verde which joined in 1977.

Morocco officially requested to join ECOWAS in February 2017. The application was endorsed in principle at the Summit of Heads of State in June 2017. However, Morocco's bid for membership was stalled as West African economic actors feared goods imported through Morocco's free trade agreements would flood the market of states within ECOWAS.

ECOWAS member states
| Country | Area (km^{2}) | Population (thousands) | GDP (nominal) (millions USD) | GDP (PPP) (millions intl.$) | Currency | Official language | Status |
|---|---|---|---|---|---|---|---|
| Benin | 114,763 | 13,754 | 8,291 | 22,377 | CFA franc | French | — |
| Cape Verde | 4,033 | 491 | 1,603 | 3,413 | escudo | Portuguese | — |
| The Gambia | 11,295 | 2,422 | 939 | 3,344 | dalasi | English | — |
| Ghana | 238,533 | 35,039 | 37,543 | 115,409 | cedi | English | — |
| Guinea | 245,857 | 13,986 | 6,699 | 15,244 | franc | French | — |
| Guinea-Bissau | 36,125 | 2,080 | 1,057 | 2,685 | CFA franc | Portuguese | Suspended |
| Ivory Coast | 322,463 | 31,500 | 31,759 | 79,766 | CFA franc | French | — |
| Liberia | 111,369 | 5,437 | 2,053 | 3,762 | dollar | English | — |
| Nigeria | 923,768 | 236,747 | 481,066 | 1,093,921 | naira | English | — |
| Senegal | 196,712 | 18,847 | 13,610 | 36,625 | CFA franc | French | — |
| Sierra Leone | 72,300 | 8,460 | 4,215 | 10,127 | leone | English | — |
| Togo | 56,785 | 9,583 | 4,088 | 10,667 | CFA franc | French | — |
| Total | 2,334,003 | 378,346 | 592,923 | 1,397,340 | — | | |

Statistics for population, nominal GDP and purchasing power parity GDP listed below are taken from World Bank estimates for 2015, published in December 2016. Area data is taken from a 2012 report compiled by the United Nations Statistics Division.

=== States that have withdrawn or been suspended ===
Arabic-speaking Mauritania was one of the founding members of ECOWAS in 1975 and decided to withdraw in December 2000. Mauritania signed a new associate-membership agreement in August 2017.

Mali was suspended from ECOWAS on 30 May 2021, following its second military coup within nine months. Guinea was also suspended on 8 September 2021, shortly after a military coup took place in the country. Sanctions were placed on both countries on 16 September. On 10 January 2022, Mali announced its decision to close its borders and recalled several ambassadors with ECOWAS in response to sanctions imposed for deferring elections for four years. On 28 January 2022, Burkina Faso was suspended from ECOWAS following a military coup. Niger was suspended from ECOWAS after the 2023 coup d'état and threatened with military intervention if President Mohamed Bazoum was not restored to office, causing the Nigerien crisis. Additionally, ECOWAS closed all land and air borders between other member states and Niger and instituted a no-fly zone on all commercial flights to and from Niger. The suspension removed all commercial and financial transactions and froze Niger's assets in ECOWAS central banks. On 16 September 2023, Niger, Mali, and Burkina Faso formed a military alliance, the Alliance of Sahel States (AES), following ECOWAS's threat to intervene to restore civilian rule in Niger. On 21 November 2023, Niger's military government asked the ECOWAS regional court to order the lifting of sanctions imposed on the country. Until the coup, aid from countries like the United States and international organizations like ECOWAS accounted for almost half of Niger's annual budget. Following Niger's ECOWAS suspension, Niger's neighbours closed their borders to the country and 70 percent of its electricity, coming from Nigeria, was cut off. While these sanctions and consequences that have followed have affected the individuals and economy of Niger, the government is not backing down. As a result of the suspension, children have not been able to attend school due to lack of supplies, and businesses are shutting down due to rising costs. Further, the ECOWAS lawyer pointed out that the Nigerien government is not recognized by ECOWAS and therefore does not have the power to ask the regional court for a removal of these sanctions.

On 28 January 2024, Niger, Mali, and Burkina Faso announced via a joint statement that they were withdrawing from ECOWAS "without delay". The three nations, all of which are currently ruled by military juntas, accused ECOWAS of implementing "inhumane" sanctions in order to reverse the coups in each nation. Under the ECOWAS protocol, immediate withdrawal is not possible, and the three member states could remain in the bloc for up to a year. ECOWAS said in a statement that "Burkina Faso, Niger and Mali remain important members of the Community and the Authority remains committed to finding a negotiated solution to the political impasse."

On 24 February 2024, ECOWAS announced that it was lifting some sanctions against Niger, Mali and Burkina Faso. For Niger this included the border closures, the freezing of central bank and state assets, the suspension of commercial transactions, and the no-fly-zone for commercial flights to and from Niger. However, the political sanctions and targeted sanctions would remain in force. The communiqué said this was done for humanitarian reasons, but it was seen as a gesture of appeasement to dissuade the three junta-led states from withdrawing from the bloc. ECOWAS also lifted sanctions on Guinea and Guinea-Bissau.

In December 2024, ECOWAS heads of state of the member countries met to finalize the decision regarding the withdrawal of Mali, Niger and Burkina Faso, united under the AES. President of Senegal, Basirou Diomaye Faye, stated on 8 December 2024 that he was continuing to discuss with the three countries remaining in ECOWAS, while maintaining the Alliance of Sahel States, which he recognized as a security response in the Sahel region. On 12 December 2024, ECOWAS President Bola Tinubu confirmed the political will of ECOWAS leaders to reintegrate the three countries from the Alliance of Sahel States. On 15 December 2024, the Conference of Heads of State of ECOWAS adopted an exit transition period for Niger, Burkina Faso, Mali, which begins on 29 January 2025 and ends on 29 July 2025. During this transition period, ECOWAS has indicated that any exit would be reversible. The AES rejected the proposal. Celebrations were held in the three countries to mark the formal exit on 29 January. ECOWAS noted the withdrawal, while calling for the continuance of existing arrangements for the free movement of people and goods, including requesting its own members still accept documents from the departing countries.

The Foreign Ministers of the Alliance of Sahel States met on 26 January 2025, in Ouagadougou "in anticipation of future talks with ECOWAS", The Ministers reached a consensus on the overall approach to future negotiations with ECOWAS, in the best interest of the Sahelian populations. From 29 January 2025, begins the beginning of a six-month "transition period" after the official separation with the three Sahelian countries. The three Sahelian countries rejected any possibility of reversing their decision.

In June 2025, the heads of state of ECOWAS met to finalize the formalities for the countries' exit from the alliance of Sahel states.

On 29 November 2025 Guinea-Bissau was suspended by ECOWAS following a coup d'état. On 28 January 2026, Guinea had its suspension lifted following the 2025 Guinean presidential election.

== History ==
ECOWAS was formed initially from the region's former French, British and Portuguese colonies, and independent Liberia, following post-colonial independence throughout the region (particularly in the 1960s and 1970s). At independence, many African states were challenged in increasing economic development. Because these states could not address problems individually, there was a need for a regional approach and thus ECOWAS was founded. ECOWAS was formed to provide regional economic cooperation, but has since evolved to include political and military cooperation, as well.

The union was established on 28 May 1975, with the signing of the Treaty of Lagos, with its stated mission to promote economic integration across the region. A revised version of the treaty was agreed and signed on 24 July 1993 in Cotonou. Considered one of the pillar regional blocs of the continent-wide African Economic Community (AEC), the stated goal of ECOWAS is to achieve "collective self-sufficiency" for its member states by creating a single large trade bloc by building a full economic and trading union.

ECOWAS also serves as a peacekeeping force in the region, with member states occasionally sending joint military forces to intervene in the bloc's member countries at times of political instability and unrest. ECOWAS facilitates peacekeeping through systematic collaboration with civil society, cooperation with development policies, and other activities with the goal to meet sub-regional security challenges. It has played an important role in monitoring transitional election in West Africa, and these mediation efforts have even been recognized within and outside the continent of Africa. In recent years these included interventions in Ivory Coast in 2003, Liberia in 2003, Guinea-Bissau in 2012, Mali in 2013, The Gambia in 2017,Guinea-Bissau in 2022, and Benin in 2025. Since its creation, ECOWAS has sent peacekeeping forces at least seven times.

In 2011, ECOWAS adopted its development blueprint for the next decade, Vision 2020, and, to accompany it, a Policy on Science and Technology (ECOPOST). However, it has had trouble achieving the goals outlined in the policy.

Covering a region known as a "coup belt", ECOWAS, since the 1990s, has attempted to defend the region's shift towards democracy against authoritarian attacks. According to the BBC, since 1990, 78% of the 27 coups in sub-Saharan Africa have taken place in former French colonies. This has led some to question whether French influence in Africa has a destabilising effect. The transition governments in Mali and Burkina Faso cancelled military agreements that allow for French troops to operate on their territory, and in the case of Mali, removed French as an official language. However, the group has been cited for mild and ineffective responses in the early 2020s, when three member countries experienced military coups d'état – two in Mali, one in Guinea, and two in Burkina Faso. When a fourth member, Niger, experienced a coup d'état in July 2023, ECOWAS was vocal in its condemnation and raised the possibility of military action if the deposed president was not reinstated by 7 August 2023. Due to the Nigerien military's refusal to restore civilian rule, ECOWAS activated its standby force composed of all other members except for Mali, Burkina Faso, Guinea and Cape Verde.

On 6 July 2024, the military leaders of Niger, Mali, and Burkina Faso signed a new pact to form a confederation, a political union of sovereign states. The confederation's stated goal is to provide mutual defense, pool resources to build energy and communications infrastructure, establish a common market, implement a monetary union under proposed currency the Sahel, allow free movement of persons, enable industrialization, and invest in agriculture, mines and energy sectors, with the end goal of federalizing into a single sovereign state. The move is seen as a strong move away from ECOWAS, which has been pressing for a return to civilian rule. On 29 January 2025, Burkina Faso, Mali, and Niger formally withdrew from ECOWAS after providing the required 1-year notice.

Within 15 hours of a thwarted coup in Benin in 2025, a joint ECOWAS deployment of Nigerian, Sierra Leonean, Ivorian, and Ghanaian soldiers were sent to aid the Beninese government.

== Structure ==
=== Overall ===
ECOWAS consists of two operating institutions to implement policies: the ECOWAS Commission and the ECOWAS Bank for Investment and Development (EBID) – formerly known as the Fund for Cooperation, until it was renamed in 2001.

In addition, ECOWAS includes the following institutions: ECOWAS Commission, Community Court of Justice, Community Parliament, ECOWAS Bank for Investment and Development (EBID), West African Health Organisation (WAHO), and the Inter-Governmental Action Group against Money Laundering and Terrorism Financing in West Africa (GIABA).

ECOWAS includes two sub-regional blocks:

- The West African Economic and Monetary Union (also known by its French-language acronym UEMOA) is an organisation of eight, mainly French-speaking, states within ECOWAS which share a customs union and currency union. Established in 1994 and intended to counterbalance the dominance of English-speaking economies in the bloc (such as Nigeria and Ghana), members of UEMOA are mostly former territories of French West Africa. The currency they all use is the CFA franc, which is pegged to the euro.
- The West African Monetary Zone (WAMZ), established in 2000, comprises six mainly English-speaking countries within ECOWAS which plan to work towards adopting their own common currency, the eco.

ECOWAS operates in three co-official languages—French, English, and Portuguese.

=== Executive secretaries and presidents of the commission ===
| Executive Secretary | Country | In office |
|---|---|---|
| Inaugural holder Aboubakar Diaby Ouattara | Ivory Coast | January 1977 – 1985 |
| Momodu Munu | Sierra Leone | 1985–1989 |
| Abass Bundu | Sierra Leone | 1989–1993 |
| Édouard Benjamin | Guinea | 1993–1997 |
| Lansana Kouyaté | Guinea | September 1997 – 31 January 2002 |
| Mohamed Ibn Chambas | Ghana | 1 February 2002 – 31 December 2006 |
| Mohamed Ibn Chambas | Ghana | 1 January 2007 – 18 February 2010 |
| James Victor Gbeho | Ghana | 18 February 2010 – 1 March 2012 |
| Kadré Désiré Ouedraogo | Burkina Faso | 1 March 2012 – 4 June 2016 |
| Marcel Alain de Souza | Benin | 4 June 2016 – 1 March 2018 |
| Jean-Claude Brou | Ivory Coast | 1 March 2018 – 3 July 2022 |
| Omar Touray | Gambia | 3 July 2022 – present |

=== Chairpersons ===
| Chairperson | Country | In office |
|---|---|---|
| Yakubu Gowon | Nigeria | 28 May 1975 – 29 July 1975 |
| Gnassingbé Eyadéma | Togo | 29 July 1975 – 13 September 1977 |
| Olusegun Obasanjo | Nigeria | 13 September 1977 – 30 September 1979 |
| Léopold Sédar Senghor | Senegal | 30 September 1979 – 31 December 1980 |
| Gnassingbé Eyadéma | Togo | 1980–1981 |
| Siaka Stevens | Sierra Leone | 1981–1982 |
| Mathieu Kérékou | Benin | 1982–1983 |
| Ahmed Sékou Touré | Guinea | 1983–1984 |
| Lansana Conté | Guinea | 1984–1985 |
| Muhammadu Buhari | Nigeria | 1985 – 27 August 1985 |
| Ibrahim Babangida | Nigeria | 27 August 1985 – 1989 |
| Dawda Jawara | Gambia | 1989–1990 |
| Blaise Compaoré | Burkina Faso | 1990–1991 |
| Dawda Jawara | Gambia | 1991–1992 |
| Abdou Diouf | Senegal | 1992–1993 |
| Nicéphore Soglo | Benin | 1993–1994 |
| Jerry Rawlings | Ghana | 1994 – 27 July 1996 |
| Sani Abacha | Nigeria | 27 July 1996 – 8 June 1998 |
| Abdulsalami Abubakar | Nigeria | 9 June 1998 – 1999 |
| Gnassingbé Eyadéma | Togo | 1999–1999 |
| Alpha Oumar Konaré | Mali | 1999 – 21 December 2001 |
| Abdoulaye Wade | Senegal | 21 December 2001 – 31 January 2003 |
| John Kufuor | Ghana | 31 January 2003 – 19 January 2005 |
| Mamadou Tandja | Niger | 19 January 2005 – 19 January 2007 |
| Blaise Compaoré | Burkina Faso | 19 January 2007 – 19 December 2008 |
| Umaru Musa Yar'Adua | Nigeria | 19 December 2008 – 18 February 2010 |
| Goodluck Jonathan | Nigeria | 18 February 2010 – 17 February 2012 |
| Alassane Ouattara | Ivory Coast | 17 February 2012 – 17 February 2013 |
| John Mahama | Ghana | 17 February 2013 – 19 May 2015 |
| Macky Sall | Senegal | 19 May 2015 – 4 June 2016 |
| Ellen Johnson Sirleaf | Liberia | 4 June 2016 – 4 June 2017 |
| Faure Gnassingbé | Togo | 4 June 2017 – 31 July 2018 |
| Muhammadu Buhari | Nigeria | 31 July 2018 – 29 June 2019 |
| Mahamadou Issoufou | Niger | 29 June 2019 – 2 June 2020 |
| Nana Akufo-Addo | Ghana | 2 June 2020 – 3 July 2022 |
| Umaro Sissoco Embaló | Guinea-Bissau | 3 July 2022 – 9 July 2023 |
| Bola Tinubu | Nigeria | 9 July 2023 – 22 June 2025 |
| Julius Maada Bio | Sierra Leone | 22 June 2025 - current |

=== Regional security co-operation ===
ECOWAS nations signed a non-aggression protocol in 1990 along with two earlier agreements in 1978 and 1981. They also signed a Protocol on Mutual Defence Assistance in Freetown, Sierra Leone, on 29 May 1981, that provided for the establishment of an Allied Armed Force of the Community.

=== Community Parliament ===
The Community Parliament consists of 115 members, distributed based on the population of each member state. This body is headed by the Speaker of the Parliament, who is above the Secretary General.

| Country | Parliament Seats |
|---|---|
| Benin | 5 |
| Burkina Faso | 6 |
| Cape Verde | 5 |
| Gambia | 5 |
| Ghana | 8 |
| Guinea | 6 |
| Guinea-Bissau | 5 |
| Ivory Coast | 7 |
| Liberia | 5 |
| Mali | 6 |
| Niger | 6 |
| Nigeria | 35 |
| Senegal | 6 |
| Sierra Leone | 5 |
| Togo | 5 |

=== Expanded ECOWAS Commission ===
For the third time since its inception in 1975, ECOWAS is undergoing institutional reforms. The first was when it revised its treaty on 24 July 1993; the second was in 2007 when the Secretariat was transformed into a Commission. As of July 2013, ECOWAS now has six new departments (Human Resources Management; Education, Science and Culture; Energy and Mines; Telecommunications and IT; Industry and Private Sector Promotion). Finance and Administration to Sierra Leone has been decoupled, to give the incoming Ghana Commissioner the new portfolio of Administration and Conferences.

=== Community Court of Justice ===
ECOWAS Community Court of Justice was created by a protocol signed in 1991 and was later included in Article 6 of the Revised Treaty of the Community in 1993. However, the Court did not officially begin operations until the 1991 protocol came into effect on 5 November 1996. The jurisdiction of the court is outlined in Article 9 and Articles 76 of the Revised Treaty and allows rulings on disputes between states over interpretations of the Revised Treaty. It also provides ECOWAS Council with advisory opinions on legal issues (Article 10). Like its companion courts, the European Court of Human Rights and East African Court of Justice, it has jurisdiction to rule on fundamental human rights breaches.

=== Sporting and cultural exchange ===
ECOWAS nations organise a broad array of cultural and sports events under the auspices of the body, including the CEDEAO Cup in football, the 2012 ECOWAS Games and the Miss CEDEAO beauty pageant.

The Community Heads of State and Government adopted African Traditional Wrestling as the Community sport, and through its specialised agency in charge of youth and sports development, the Ouagadougou-based ECOWAS Youth and Sports Development Centre (EYSDC), has consistently organised the yearly ECOWAS African Wrestling Tournament mainly in Dakar (Senegal) and Niamey (Niger) based on a harmonized African wrestling code.

The Community, through the EYSDC, also organized 2 editions of ECOWAS International Cycling tour, taking close to 100 riders from all member states, from Lagos to Accra and then from Lagos to Abidjan. In addition to the sports and well-being objective of the tour, the race also served to demonstrate and put into practice ECOWAS protocol on free movement of goods and persons.

In 2019, the EYSDC instituted ECOWAS Abuja International Marathon. The first edition brought together international marathoners from West Africa, Kenya, Ethiopia and Cameroon.

Similarly, the Community, through its specialised agency, promotes regional sports development by offering sponsorship to regional sports federations and specialized disciplines such as the West African Deaf Sports Union (WADSU), the West African Liaison Office of the International Council for Military Sports (WALO-CISM), the Region 2 of the African Athletics Federation, and the West African University Games (WAUG), among others.

=== Youth ===
The ECOWAS Youth Policy Strategic Plan of Action (SPAO) is a 10-year plan that aims to promote youth development and empowerment in the Economic Community of West African States (ECOWAS). The SPAO was adopted in 2016 and is based on the pillars of education and training, employment and entrepreneurship, health and well-being, peace and security, and governance and participation.

The SPAO identifies a number of challenges facing youth in ECOWAS, including high unemployment rates, lack of access to education and training, and poor health outcomes. The plan sets out a number of strategies to address these challenges, including investing in education and training, creating jobs and supporting entrepreneurship, improving access to health care, promoting peace and security, and strengthening youth participation in governance.

== Economic integration ==
=== West African Economic and Monetary Union (UEMOA) ===
Formed in 1994 on the basis of earlier arrangements whose roots lie in the colonial era of French West Africa, the West African Economic and Monetary Union, often referred to by its French acronym UEMOA, brings together eight West African states of which seven were French colonies until the late 1950s. The member countries use the West African CFA franc as their currency and share common institutions including the Central Bank of West African States, Banking Commission of the West African Monetary Union, Financial Markets Authority of the West African Monetary Union, and (together with other African countries of the Franc Zone) Regional Insurance Control Commission.

==== Membership ====
- Benin (founding member)
- Burkina Faso (founding member)
- Guinea-Bissau (joined on 2 May 1997)
- Ivory Coast (founding member)
- Mali (founding member)
- Niger (founding member)
- Senegal (founding member)
- Togo (founding member)

=== West African Monetary Zone ===
Formed in 2000, the West African Monetary Zone (WAMZ) is a group of six countries within ECOWAS that plan to introduce a common currency called the eco. The six member states of WAMZ are Gambia, Ghana, Guinea, Nigeria and Sierra Leone who founded the organisation together in 2000 and Liberia who joined on 16 February 2010. Apart from Guinea, which is francophone, they are all English-speaking countries. Along with Mauritania, Guinea opted out of the CFA franc currency shared by all other former French colonies in West and Central Africa.

The WAMZ attempts to establish a strong stable currency to rival the CFA franc, whose exchange rate is tied to that of the euro and is guaranteed by the French Treasury. The eventual goal is for the CFA franc and eco to merge, giving all of West and Central Africa a single, stable currency. The launch of the new currency is being developed by the West African Monetary Institute based in Accra, Ghana.

With the exit of Mali, Niger and Burkina Faso from the body, two structural options for a single currency could emerge: the "Sahel" for the AES and the "Eco" for the ECOWAS member countries.

==== Membership ====
- Gambia (founding member)
- Ghana (founding member)
- Guinea (founding member)
- Liberia (joined on 16 February 2010)
- Nigeria (founding member)
- Sierra Leone (founding member)

=== The Free Movement of Persons, Residence and Establishment Protocol ===
In May 1979, ECOWAS adopted a Free Movement of Persons, Residence and Establishment Protocol, which permits citizens to enter, reside, and establish economic activities in the territory of member states. There were three phases of implementation to achieve the goals of the protocol. Over the course of five years, Phase I eliminated the need for visas for stays of up to 90 days within the ECOWAS territory. Phase II attempted to extend residency to citizens in host ECOWAS states to seek income-earning employment after obtaining an ECOWAS residence card. Phase II also required member states to grant migrant workers equal treatment in areas such as employment, participation, social and cultural activities, and in certain cases of job loss, re-employment, and training. Phase III centered on the facilitation and establishment of business through the right of citizens to manage economic activities in countries other than their country of origin. However, this right has not been fully established in the ECOWAS region. While these three phases promoting freedom of movement within the ECOWAS region is more advanced than in any other regional grouping in Africa, only the first phase has been fully implemented by all ECOWAS countries. The complete implementation of the 90-day visa-free window enhanced human mobility in the region, creating positive effects on trade and economic development.

In December 2000, the ECOWAS passport was introduced as a common passport that functions as an international travel document, and member states are currently in the process of implementing a joint visa for non-ECOWAS citizens. Additionally, ECOWAS has worked to ease the movement of people transported in private and commercial vehicles by implementing policies that enable vehicles to enter and reside in a State for up to ninety days. Most ECOWAS states have instituted an ECOWAS brown card, which provides prompt, fair, and immediate compensation for any motor accident which occurs outside a motorist's home-country.

While monitoring committees exist to ensure all three phases of the protocol are successfully implemented, their work is vague and has not been credited with effective and efficient production of data. The largest challenges assosicated within the implementation of the protocol occur due to lack of commitment and enforceability. More so, there is a lack of access to readily available migrant information in the ECOWAS region. This poses a barrier to freedom of movement as immigration officials in member states are unaware that individuals who hold valid travel documents can enter their country freely. Therefore, West African migrants, who are entitled to enter through regular channels, leave their countries without proper travel documents and enter other countries illegally. This illegal and irregular entry poses a barrier towards gaining reliable travel statistics.

For example, Francophone countries in the region have issued national identity cards that can be used similarly to a passport. These cards permit citizens to cross borders after presenting their identity cards. However, Anglophone countries have only just begun distributing a similar form of identification. Consequently, immigration officials in Anglophone countries commonly reject Francophone national identity cards and do not permit Francophone citizens to cross into their borders. Further, these structural barriers are exasperated between different social classes. Middle-class individuals typically experience a smoother border-crossing process than working-class individuals and impoverished citizens who do not have travel documents and are not fluent in the language of the countries they are crossing into.

== Transport ==
A Trans-ECOWAS project, established in 2007, plans to upgrade railways in this zone.

== Tourism ==
In 2019, ECOWAS unveiled its Ecotour Action Plan 2019 – 2029. It focuses on tourism heritage protection and development and on the development of standards, regulations, and control systems. The plan includes five programs for implementation, and detailed mechanisms for monitoring and evaluation. Ecotourism is not specifically developed, yet it has been mentioned that the program has the opportunity to create linkages between institutions and stakeholder collaboration to suit ecotourism projects that prioritize community, biodiversity, and socioeconomics. The Ecotour Plan prioritizes local development, especially in generating skilled and unskilled jobs for marginalized individuals, and aims to make the ECOWAS region a first-class tourist destination in Africa. During its creation, ECOWAS ministers also called on ecotourism programs to protect threatened biodiversity in the Guinean Forests, which span into seven ECOWAS member states. Similar to the Free Movement of People Protocol, Ecotour aims to integrate aviation and ground transportation. ECOWAS hopes that this regional approach will allow states to fight against pandemics such as COVID-19 to restore tourism and ecosystems. Ecotour works to create increasing returns to its members' economies by lowering transport costs, developing hospitality training centers and creating a more integrated use of digital technology.

As of March 2023, Council members mentioned that phases one and two of the Ecotour Action Plan have come to an end and that the community is moving into phase three and four, which focuses on the development of tourist accommodations establishments, and a proposal for a regional mechanism to enforce tourist regulations. By the end of phase five, ECOWAS hopes to have unified accommodations in hotels, ecolodges, motels, apart hotels, and hostels. In April 2023, tourism experts met to amend the new text for tourist accommodations in the ECOWAS region. This phase is critical to the success of the Ecotour plan as the lack of a regulatory system has been a barrier to the development of the tourism sector, despite its ability to increase member states' economies. During this conference, ministers improved the tourism industry by adopting standards for hotel services. Massandjé Toure-Liste, the ECOWAS Commission's Commissioner for Economic Affairs and Agriculture, pointed out the improvements in the tourist sector due to the African Continental Free Trade Area, a trade agreement signed by 44 members of the African Union which creates a single market for goods and services. Toure-Liste praised the trade area for providing development opportunities, economic growth, and boosting regional integration.

== See also ==
- Brown card system – motor insurance scheme of ECOWAS
- Common Market for Eastern and Southern Africa (COMESA)
- East African Community
- Economic Community of Central African States (ECCAS)
- Economy of Africa
- ECOWAS Peace Pageant
- Intergovernmental Authority on Development
- Southern African Development Community (SADC)
- Alliance of Sahel States – a separatist bloc
