= Édouard Benjamin =

Guinean politician and diplomat

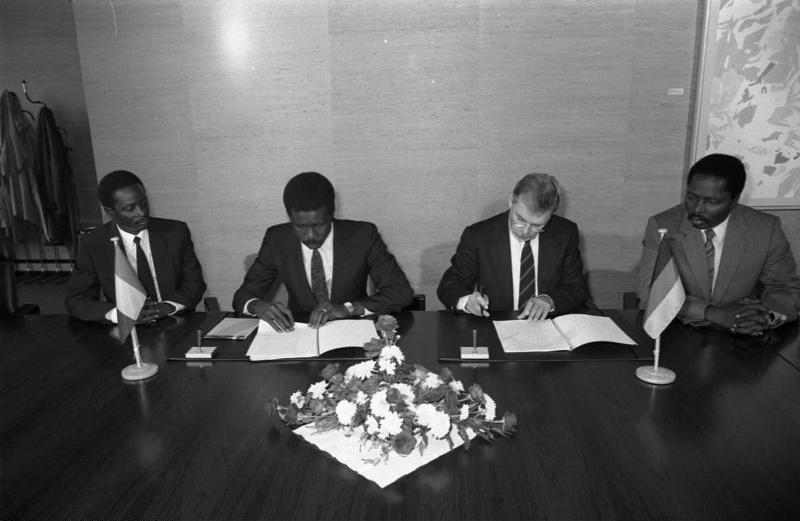
Bonn, 1986, Édouard Benjamin (centre left).

Édouard Benjamin (born 1941) is a diplomat from Guinea. He was Minister of Economy and Finance from 1989 to 1992. He served as Executive Secretary of the Economic Community of West African States (ECOWAS) from 1993 to 1997.

Preceded by Abass Bundu	Executive Secretary of the Economic Community of West African States; 1993–1997	Succeeded by Lansana Kouyaté
