= Aboubakar Diaby Ouattara =

Ivorian politician and diplomat

Aboubakar Diaby Ouattara (born 25 December 1938 - 2013) is a diplomat from Côte d'Ivoire. He served as the first Executive Secretary in the Economic Community of West African States (ECOWAS) from its inception in 1977 until 1985.

Preceded by none	Executive Secretary of the Economic Community of West African States; 1977–1985	Succeeded by Momodu Munu
