= Edmund Cowan =

Sierra Leonean politician

Justice Edmond Cowan

Speaker of the House of Parliament of Sierra Leone
- In office 2000–2007
- Preceded by: Sheku Mohamed Fadril Kutubu
- Succeeded by: Abel Nathaniel Bankole Stronge

Personal details
- Born: 1937 (age 88–89)
- Profession: jurist, Justice

Edmond K. Cowan (born 1937) was a Sierra Leonean politician. He was the speaker of Parliament of Sierra Leone from 2000 to 2007. He was subsequently appointed as the country's Ombudsman.
