= Kadijatu Kebbay =

Sierra Leonean model and beauty queen (born 1986)

Kadijatu Kebbay (born 1986, in Freetown) is a Sierra Leonean model and beauty queen who won Miss University Sierra Leone 2006 beauty contest which took place on 29 July 2006. She won a Mazda saloon car and represented Sierra Leone in South Korea at the World Miss University contest.
