= Peter Vandy =

Sierra Leonean politician

Peter Vandy is a politician in Sierra Leone. He is a member of the Revolutionary United Front and ran alongside Pallo Bangura in the 2002 Presidential election. He is a former government Minister of Lands and Environment and was detained alongside other government ministers Pallo Bangura and Mike Lamin among others in 2000.
