= Momodu Munu =

Sierra Leonean diplomat (born 1938)

Momodu Munu (born 1938) is a former diplomat from Sierra Leone. From 1985 to 1989, Munu served as the Executive Secretary of the Economic Community of West African States.

Preceded by Aboubakar Diaby Ouattara	Executive Secretary of the Economic Community of West African States; 1985–1989	Succeeded by Abass Bundu
