= West African Unit of Account =

Unit of account used for West African monetary cooperation

WAUA

ISO 4217
- Code: None

Unit
- Unit: WAUA

Demographics
- Date of introduction: 1975 (under WACH); administered by WAMA since 1996
- User(s): Benin; Burkina Faso; Cape Verde; Côte d'Ivoire; The Gambia; Ghana; Guinea; Guinea-Bissau; Liberia; Mali; Niger; Nigeria; Senegal; Sierra Leone; Togo

Issuance
- Central bank: West African Monetary Agency (WAMA)
- Website: amao-wama.org

Valuation
- Pegged with: SDR (1:1)
- WAUA is defined by WAMA as equal to the IMF SDR.

The West African Unit of Account (WAUA) is an artificial unit of account used within the ECOWAS monetary cooperation framework, primarily for multilateral clearing and settlement among member central banks. It was introduced under the former West African Clearing House (WACH) and is administered by the West African Monetary Agency (WAMA), which succeeded WACH in 1996.

WAMA states that 1 WAUA is equivalent to 1 SDR, making WAUA’s valuation anchored to the IMF’s SDR valuation framework.

== History ==
WACH was established in 1975 as a multilateral payment facility to promote intra-subregional trade; it was transformed into WAMA in 1996. United Nations Economic Commission for Africa (UNECA) describes WAUA as an artificial unit of account linked to the IMF SDR, used as a benchmark in the WACH clearing mechanism.

== Use ==
WAUA has been used for pricing/settlement in regional clearing arrangements and for monitoring exchange-rate movements within the ECOWAS monetary cooperation process. WAMA notes that it facilitates settlement within the sub-region through the introduction and use of WAUA and operates a clearing and payments system among member central banks.

== Valuation ==
WAMA defines the relationship as 1 WAUA = 1 SDR. The IMF publishes official SDR valuation and reference exchange rates, which can be used to express WAUA in major currencies given the 1:1 equivalence.

== Exchange rates ==
WAMA publishes daily exchange rate summaries that include WAUA alongside major currencies (such as USD, GBP and EUR) and other reported rates.

== See also ==
- Special drawing rights
- Economic Community of West African States
