= Sierra Leone Scouts Association =

National Scouting organization of Sierra Leone

- Location: New England Ville, Freetown
- Country: Sierra Leone
- Founded: 1909
- Membership: 11,749
- Affiliation: World Organization of the Scout Movement, Africa Scout Region, The Mano River Union

The Sierra Leone Scouts Association, the national Scouting organization of Sierra Leone, was founded in 1909, and became a member of the World Organization of the Scout Movement in 1964. The coeducational Sierra Leone Scouts Association has 11,749 members as of 2011.

In 1971, Emile F. Luke was awarded the Bronze Wolf, the only distinction of the World Organization of the Scout Movement, awarded by the World Scout Committee for exceptional services to world Scouting.

The Sierra Leone Scouts Association was host of the 3rd West Africa Zonal Conference and Youth Camp. A total of 75 Scouts participated from 9 West African countries.

Recent military unrest has cut Scouting activities and communications. Since then Scouting has struggled to keep up its membership and activities up until 2014, where they had to rebrand to start a new phase. Since then, they have organized series of partnerships, trainings and recruitment to carry out its regular services.

== Activities ==
Scouts are concerned about community development, and the association is well known for promoting self-help projects. Scouts are popular throughout the country due to their numerous community service projects, particularly in rural areas.

Proficiency badges are mandatory in the field of public service, resourcefulness and agriculture.

The Sierra Leone Scouts Association is working with the Ministry of Social Welfare, Gender and Children's Affairs to ensure the development of Scouting in the country. The SLSA is currently working on a Street Kids Program sponsored by WOSM. The Sierra Leone Scouts Association is looking for partners to start a bio-intensive agricultural project.

== Emblem ==
The membership badge of the Sierra Leone Scouts Association features a lion, a symbol in use since Sierra Leone was a colonial branch of British Scouting and an allusion to the country's name.

== See also ==
- The Sierra Leone Girl Guides Association
