= Solomon G. Seisay =

Chief Superintendent Solomon Seisay
- rank

1st National Director of Prisons
- Monarch: Elizabeth II
- Preceded by: none

Personal details
- Born: February 1926 Mokorewoh, Moyamba, British Sierra Leone
- Died: 1996 (aged 69–70) Freetown, Sierra Leone
- Children: Malcolm, Olive, Maada, Ansumana & Sarah

Solomon George Seisay (February 1926 – 1996) was a Sierra Leonean civil servant who made history when he became the nation's first indigenous National Director of Prisons.

== Early life ==
Solomon Seisay was the scion of an influential, landowning family in Moyamba District, Sierra Leone. He is the older brother of former Consul General Tinga Seisay and cousin of Brigadier General John Bangura.

== Career ==
Seisay graduated with honors from the Police Training School at Hastings. He advanced to the position of Senior Superintendent of the Sierra Leone Police Force. He was stationed all over the country until he was appointed Commandant of the Police Training School, his alma mater. Seisay made history when he became Sierra Leone's first indigenous Director of Prisons in 1965. He was very progressive and realized the importance the rehabilitative side of incarceration. During his tenure, Sierra Leone's prisons were in excellent condition.

Seisay later became Chief of Security in Kenema where he was responsible for security at Sierra Leone's diamond and gold mines. He devised effective policies for the prevention smuggling. After his retirement, the security in Kenema deteriorated drastically.

== Private life ==
Seisay became a private businessman, opening The Atlantic Amusement Center in Freetown.

Police appointments
Preceded by none	National Director of Prisons; 1965–1971	Succeeded by unknown
Police appointments
Preceded by unknown	Commandant of the National Police Training School; 1963–1965	Succeeded by unknown
Police appointments
Preceded by unknown	Senior Superintendent of the Sierra Leone Police Force; 1965–1971	Succeeded by unknown
