= Hindolo Trye =

Sierra Leonean politician (died 2012)

Hindolo Sumanguru Trye (died 26 July 2012) was a Sierra Leonean politician with the All People's Congress (APC). Prior to his death, he was Sierra Leone's Minister of Tourism and Cultural Affairs.

Preceded by Okere Adams	Minister of Tourism and Cultural Affairs of Sierra Leone; 2007-2012	Succeeded by Peter Bayuku Konte
