= Rosaline Smith =

Sierra Leonean politician

Rosaline Jariatu Smith is a Sierra Leonean politician and member of parliament representing the All People's Congress party.

== Career ==
Rosaline Jariatu Smith is the member of parliament for Constituency 103 in the Western Urban. She is one of the few women members of parliament in her country. In 2012 when she first stood for parliament, there were 38 other female candidates and 548 males candidates. During the Ebola crisis in 2015, she represented Sierra Leone's Parliamentary Committee on Foreign Affairs to present relief items to National Ebola Response Centre. Smith represented her country among delegates made up of global leaders who participated in the sixth assembly of the International Renewable Energy Agency conference in 2016 in Abu Dhabi. She cemented her country's commitment to join the ongoing global energy transition by stating that "We have to have broad stakeholders’ participation in renewable energy. In that way, we are sure that we don’t have only a technological revolution, but also a broad social movement."
