= Tamba Kaingbanja =

Sierra Leonean politician

Tamba E. Kaingbanja is a Sierra Leonean politician from the opposition Sierra Leone People's Party (SLPP). He is a member of the parliament of Sierra Leone, representing the Kono District. Kaingbaja is from the Kono ethnic group.
