= George Banda-Thomas =

Sierra Leonean politician

Minister of Internal Affairs

Personal details
- Party: Sierra Leone People's Party (SLPP)

George Banda-Thomas is a Sierra Leonean politician.

He was appointed Minister of Trade and Industry under President Ahmad Tejan Kabbah. Banda-Thomas supported presidential candidate Charles Margai at the September 2005 SLPP Convention which cost him his job when Margai lost the election. He was later given a new appointment as Sierra Leone's Minister of Internal Affairs.
