= Augustine Kortu =

Sierra Leonean politician

Augustine Kortu (born in Kailahun, Kailahun District) is a Sierra Leonean politician. He was Kailahun District Council chairman and mayor of Kailahun until July 2008. He is from the Kissi ethnic group.
