= Okere Adams =

Sierra Leonean politician

Minister of Tourism and Culture of Sierra Leone
- In office September 2005 – September 2007
- President: Ahmed Tejan Kabbah
- Preceded by: Chernor Jalloh
- Succeeded by: Hindolo Trye

Minister of Marine Resources of Sierra Leone
- In office 2002–2005
- President: Ahmed Tejan Kabbah
- Succeeded by: Chernor Jalloh

Personal details
- Died: Freetown, Sierra Leone
- Party: Sierra Leone People's Party
- Education: Bo Government Secondary School; St. Edward's Secondary School

Okere Adams was a Sierra Leonean politician. In 2002, Adams was appointed as the Minister of Marine Resources under Ahmed Tejan Kabbah.

== Career ==
Okere Adams held several important government offices in the Sierra Leone People's Party (SLPP) administration.

In the early 2000s: following the end of the civil war, Adams was appointed Minister of Marine Resources. During this period, he oversaw efforts to develop Sierra Leone's fishing sector and address issues such as licensing and foreign fishing activities.

In September 2005, he switched portfolio's with Chernor Jalloh and became the Minister of Tourism and Culture. Adams was replaced by Hindolo Trye upon Ernest Bai Koroma becoming president in September 2007. Adams was a member of the Temne ethnic group. Okere Adams To Be Buried Tomorrow

Family sources confirmed in 2019 that Okere Adams died and was laid to rest in his home town of Magburaka. He died on Friday 8 March 2019 at the 34 Military Hospital in Freetown. He served in various Cabinet positions in the Tejan Kabbah led SLPP administration between 1996 and 2007. He also served as National Organizing Secretary of the SLPP between 2002 and 2008. The late Okere Adams attended the Bo Government Secondary School and later Saint Edwards Secondary School in Freetown. He attended several higher institutions of learning in Germany and Switzerland after a brief stay in the United Kingdom. He died at the age of 77.

== Sources ==
- Listing of cabinet of Sierra Leone

Preceded by ?	Minister of Marine Resources of Sierra Leone; 2002-2005	Succeeded by Chernor Jalloh
Preceded by Chernor Jalloh	Minister of Tourism and Culture of Sierra Leone; 2005-2007	Succeeded by Hindolo Trye
