= Abass Bundu =

Sierra Leonean politician and diplomat (born 1948)

Abass Chernor Bundu
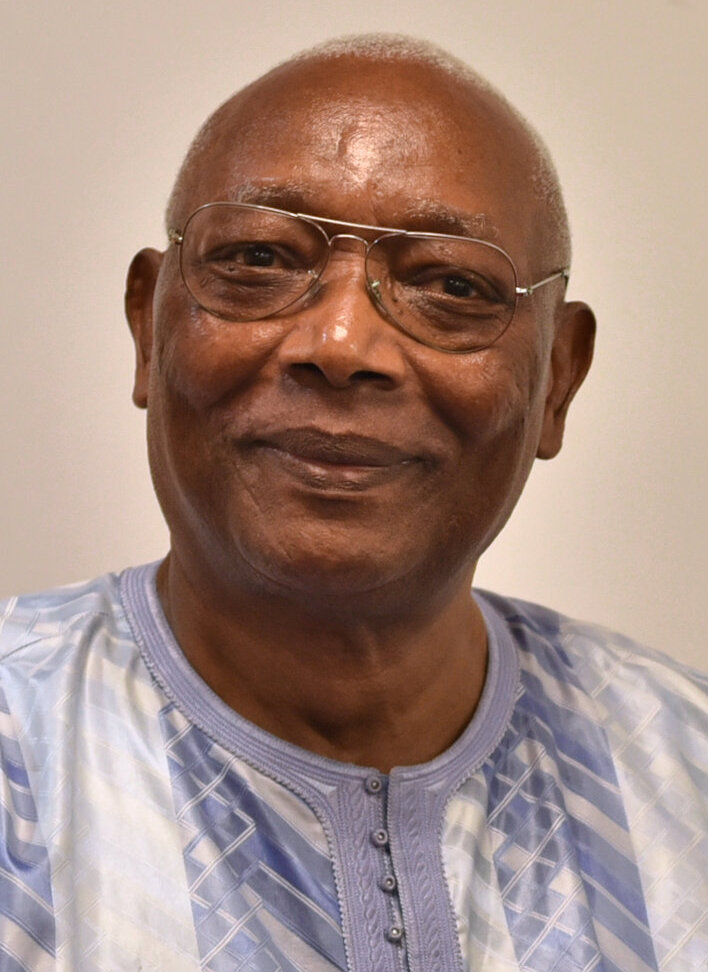
- Bundu in 2023

Speaker of the House of Parliament of Sierra Leone
- In office 25 April 2018 – 2 May 2024
- President: Julius Maada Bio
- Preceded by: Sheku Badara Bashiru Dumbuya
- Succeeded by: Segepoh Solomon Thomas

Northern Regional Chairman of the Sierra Leone People's Party
- Incumbent
- Assumed office 2013

Leader of the Progressive People's Party (PPP)
- In office 1996–1996

Sierra Leone Minister of Foreign Affairs
- In office 1994–1995
- Preceded by: Karefa Kargbo
- Succeeded by: Alusine Fofanah

Executive Secretary of the Economic Community of West African States
- In office 1989–1993
- Preceded by: Momodu Munu
- Succeeded by: Edouard Benjamin

Personal details
- Born: Abass Chernoh Bundu; 3 June 1948 (age 78) Gbinti, British Sierra Leone
- Party: Sierra Leone People's Party (SLPP)
- Education: Australian National University, University of Cambridge
- Profession: Economist, attorney

Abass Chernor Bundu (born 1948 in Gbinti, Port Loko District) is a Sierra Leonean politician, diplomat, and the former Speaker of the Sierra Leone House of Parliament, in office from 25 April 2018 to 2 May 2024. Bundu was elected speaker by receiving 70 votes in Parliament. The main opposition the All People's Congress, which won the most seats in Parliament, boycotted the election process in protest and did not nominate a candidate for speaker. Bundu is a veteran politician, and a very close ally and personal friend of Sierra Leone's president Julius Maada Bio.

Before being elected speaker, Bundu was the northern regional chairman of the Sierra Leone People's Party (SLPP). He is an influential senior member of the ruling Sierra Leone People's Party

Bundu is the older brother of Ibrahim Bundu, a member of Parliament of the main opposition All People's Congress.

From 1989 to 1993, Bundu was the executive secretary of the Economic Community of West African States. Bundu was the head of several ministries in Sierra Leone, including Foreign Affairs and Agriculture. He was the presidential candidate of the now defunct Progressive People's Party (PPP) in the 1996 Sierra Leone presidential election, where he was defeated in the first round of voting after winning 2.9% of the votes.

Bundu holds a Bachelor of Laws degree from the Australian National University and both a Master of Laws and a PhD in International Law from the University of Cambridge in England.

== Early life ==
Abass Chernor Bundu was born in the rural town of Gbinti, Port Loko District in the Northern Province of Sierra Leone, then under British control. Bundu was born into a prominent Bundu family who are of Fula and Temne descent. Abass Bundu grew up in a deeply religious Muslim household and he is a devout Muslim.

== Education ==
Bundu attended the St. Andrews Secondary School in Bo, the Methodist Boys' High School in Freetown, and the St. Edward's Secondary School also in Freetown. While in secondary school, Bundu was a very brilliant student and he was highly admired by his fellow students and teachers.

Immediately after secondary school, Bundu left Sierra Leone as a youth and moved abroad to further his education. He holds a Bachelor of Laws degree from the Australian National University and both a Master of Laws and a PhD in International Law from the University of Cambridge, England. He is also a Barrister-at-Law.

== Career ==
Bundu's numerous positions include assistant director of International Affairs and Consultant in Constitutional Law in the Commonwealth Secretariat in London from 1975 to 1982; Executive Secretary of Economic Community of West African States (ECOWAS) from 1989 to 1993, the posts of Foreign Minister (1994–1995), Minister of Agriculture 1982–85; and presidential candidate in the 1996 presidential election in Sierra Leone. Bundu failed to garner much support in the election, gaining just under 30,000 votes or 2.9% of the national vote. He is an expert on West African affairs and a renowned expert on constitutional and international law. Bundu has written a critical analysis of the Civil War in Sierra Leone, Democracy by Force?

== Opposition to President Momoh ==
In 1991, Bundu strongly criticised President Joseph Saidu Momoh's government because of clauses their party wished to add to Sierra Leone's constitution. He was then forced to leave the All People's Congress (APC).

Bundu contested the 1996 elections as not democratically free and fair.

== Presidential campaign ==
In 1996, Bundu formed his own political party and ran for president in Sierra Leone. His bid was unsuccessful.

== Alleged corruption and exoneration ==
In 1996, Bundu was prosecuted for alleged illegal sale of Sierra Leone passports under the immigration investment programme. In October 2005, the government of Sierra Leone dropped the prosecution and publicly exonerated Bundu of any wrongdoing based on new evidence which, had it been available in 1996, would not have given rise to any prosecution.

Political offices
Preceded by Momodu Munu	Executive Secretary of the Economic Community of West African States; 1989–1993	Succeeded by Edouard Benjamin
Preceded by Karefa Kargbo	Minister of Foreign Affairs of Sierra Leone; 1994–1995	Succeeded by Alusine Fofanah
