= Apha Saidu Bangura =

Sierra Leonean political commentator

Personal details
- Born: Freetown, Sierra Leone
- Party: Sierra Leone People's Party (SLPP)
- Relations: Prince George's County, Maryland, U.S.

Apha Saidu Bangura is a Sierra Leonean social media political commentator and political analyst who is currently a member of the communication unit at the Sierra Leone Ministry of Information and Communication . He regularly releases audio on WhatsApp and videos on YouTube about the latest major Sierra Leonean political news and other major incidents in Sierra Leone. Alpha Saidu is well known in the Sierra Leonean community in the United States and the Sierra Leonean community in Europe. Alpha Saidu is also well known across Sierra Leone.

Alpha Saidu is a regular outspoken critic of Sierra Leone's political elites, he is particularly very critical of former Sierra Leone"s president Ernest Bai Koroma and the All People's Congress (APC).

Alpha Saidu is a member of the ruling Sierra Leone People's Party (SLPP), and he often praises many of the SLPP founding fathers, especially Sierra Leone Independent leader Sir Milton Margai.

Alpha Saidu was an outspoken critic of many of the present SLPP politicians, especially former Sierra Leone military ruler and current Sierra Leone president Julius Maada Bio. However, Alpha Saidu has given his full support to Bio after Bio was elected the SLPP presidential candidate for the 2018 Sierra Leone presidential election.

Alpha Saidu even attended an SLPP fundraising dinner in Dallas, Texas in support of Bio. Alpha Saidu said he has given his support to Bio because Bio was democratically elected by the large majority of the SLPP delegate as the party's presidential candidate for 2018 Sierra Leone presidential election, and as a member of the SLPP he has unified with members of the party to support the presidential candidate.

Alpha Saidu was born and raised in Freetown, Sierra Leone to Muslim parents from the Temne ethnic group. Alpha Saidu himself is a devout Muslim and he often quote verses from the Quran during his speech.
