= Bu-Buakei Jabbi =

Sierra Leonean lawyer and politician (born 1945)

Member of Parliament of Sierra Leone from Constituency 8 in Kailahun District
- Incumbent
- Assumed office December 7, 2012

Personal details
- Born: May 7, 1945 (age 80) Kailahun District, British Sierra Leone
- Party: Sierra Leone People's Party(SLPP)
- Profession: Lawyer, Attorney

Bu-Buakei Jabbi (born May 7, 1945) is a Sierra Leonean lawyer and politician from the Sierra Leone People's Party (SLPP). He is an elected member of Parliament of Sierra Leone for Constituency 8 in Kailahun District. He is the senior attorney for the SLPP.

Jabbi was the SLPP candidate for a seat in the Sierra Leone House of Parliament for Constituency 8 in Kailahun District, a reliable SLPP stronghold. He won the election in an overwhelming landslide with 86.10%, defeating his closest rival Fayia Kellie of the All People's Congress (APC) who took 10.58%.

In 2011, Bu-Buakei Jabbi took the SLPP, a party he is a member, to the Supreme Court of Sierra Leone in an internal dispute between him and the party. The dispute has since been settled.

Jabbi is a Muslim and a native of Kailahun District in Eastern Sierra Leone. He is a member of the Mandingo ethnic group.
