= The Sierra Leone Girl Guides Association =

National Guiding organization of Sierra Leone

- Headquarters: Tower Hill, Freetown, Western Area
- Founded: 1924
- Membership: 2,600
- Affiliation: World Association of Girl Guides and Girl Scouts

The Sierra Leone Girl Guides Association is the national Guiding organization of Sierra Leone. It serves 2,600 members (as of 2018). Founded in 1924, the girls-only organization became a full member of the World Association of Girl Guides and Girl Scouts in 1963. The current headquarters of the organization is at Tower Hill, Freetown, Western Area.

The membership badge of the Sierra Leone Girl Guides Association incorporates a lion and a palm tree in front of mountains, suggesting Lion Mountain, the translation of the country's name.

== Publications ==
- The Sierra Leone Girl Guides Association (ed.): 60 years of guiding: Girl Guides, 1924-1984. "Service through guiding". Sierra Leone, 1984

== See also ==
- Sierra Leone Scouts Association
