= Segepoh Solomon Thomas =

Sierra Leonean politician

Speaker of the House of Parliament of Sierra Leone
- Incumbent
- Assumed office 2 May 2024
- Preceded by: Abass Bundu

Personal details
- Political party: Sierra Leone People's Party

Segepoh Solomon Thomas is a Sierra Leonean politician from the Sierra Leone People's Party. He has served as Speaker of the House of Parliament of Sierra Leone since 2024.

== See also ==
- Speakers of the House of Parliament of Sierra Leone
