= Brima Bangura =

Sierra Leonean international goalkeeper

Personal information
- Full name: Brima Attouga Bangura
- Date of birth: January 27, 1981 (age 45)
- Place of birth: Kenema, Sierra Leone
- Position: Goalkeeper

Team information
- Current team: Ports Authority F.C.

International career
Years	Team	Apps	(Gls)
1999–	Sierra Leone		

Brima Attouga Bangura (born January 27, 1981, in Kenema, Sierra Leone) is a Sierra Leonean international goalkeeper. He is one of the best goalkeepers in Sierra Leone. he plays for Ports Authority F.C. one of the top soccer clubs in Sierra Leone League

Bangura was recruited into football by his late boss Brima Attouga Kamara, a former goalkeeper for Sierra Leone national football team. Having been initiated into football, Bangura made a name for himself while playing in a series of junior league competitions played all over Freetown. He won several best goalkeeper awards with youth clubs like Blackhall Strikers, Junior Cenegal, and Best Contractors. In 1992, Brima Attouga Kamara brought him to Ports Authority youth team.

In 1996, he was promoted from the youth team to the senior squad. In 1997, Bangura was outstanding in goal in an international friendly against a top Liberian side Invincible Eleven. Since that match, he has excelled as Ports Authority first choice goalkeeper, and as well as one of the best goalkeepers in Sierra Leone. He made his senior debut for Sierra Leone in 1999.
