= Bangura, India =

Census town in Kendujhar district, Odisha, India

Bangura
- Census town
- Location in Odisha, India Bangura (India)
- Coordinates: 21.283°N 86.296°E
- Country: India
- State: Odisha
- District: Kendujhar

Population (2001)
  - Total: 5,168

Languages
  - Official: Odia
- Time zone: UTC+5:30 (IST)
- Vehicle registration: OD
- Website: odisha.gov.in

Bangura is a census town in Kendujhar district in the state of Odisha, India.

== Demographics ==
At the 2001 India census, Bangur had a population of 5,168 (52% male, 48% female). Bangur had an average literacy rate of 57%, lower than the national average of 59.5%; with 62% of the males and 38% of females literate. 14% of the population were under 6 years of age.
