= Western Area Urban District =

- Location of Western Area Urban District in Sierra Leone
- Coordinates: 8°29′N 13°14′W
- Country: Sierra Leone
- Province: Western Area
- Capital: Freetown
- Largest city: Freetown

Government
  - Mayor: Yvonne Aki-Sawyerr

Area
  - Total: 82 km^{2} (32 sq mi)

Population (2015 census)
  - Total: 1,050,301
- Time zone: UTC-5 (Greenwich Mean Time)
- HDI (2017): 0.557 medium · 1st

The Western Area Urban District is one of the 16 districts of Sierra Leone. It is by far the most populous district in the country with a population of 1,050,301 and is located in the Western Area of the country. The Western Area Urban District exclusively comprises the entire city of Freetown, the national capital, and its divided into the East End of Freetown, Central Freetown and the West End of Freetown; which are in turns divided into wards and constituencies within the City of Freetown.

== Demographics ==
The district is the most ethnically diverse in Sierra Leone, as it is home to a significant population of all of Sierra Leone's ethnic groups. Like in virtually all parts of Sierra Leone, the Krio language is by far the most widely spoken language in Freetown and is spoken by the entire residents of Western Area Urban District.

== Government ==
The district is locally governed by a directly elected city council, known as the Freetown City Council, headed by a mayor. Members of the Freetown city council and the mayor of Freetown, are directly elected every four years in a municipal election. The Freetown City Council is the largest of the six municipal governments in Sierra Leone.

In 2007, the Western Area Urban District gained nine seats in the Parliament of Sierra Leone when district representation started to be measured by population.

== Economy ==
The Western Area Urban District is the wealthiest in Sierra Leone, having the largest economy, financial and cultural center, as well as the seat of the country's central government. During the course of the Ebola virus epidemic in West Africa, the Western Area Urban District was selected to trial a vaccine for the disease as it had been heavily affected by the outbreak.

== Administrative divisions ==
=== Chiefdoms ===
After the 2017 local administrative reorganization, Western Area Urban District has made up of seven chiefdoms as the third level of administrative subdivision.

- Central Freetown
1. Central Freetown I
2. Central Freetown II
- East End of Freetown
1. East End of Freetown I
2. East End of Freetown II
3. East End of Freetown III
- West End of Freetown
1. West End of Freetown I
2. West End of Freetown II
3. West End of Freetown III

=== Cities ===
- Freetown, the nation's capital

== Religion ==
Religion in Western Area Urban Province (2015)
Religion	Percent(%)
Islam	67.9%
Christianity	31.3%
Baháʼí	0.1%
Traditional African religions	0.0%
Other	0.6%
No religion	0.1%
