= Alimamy Pallo Bangura =

Sierra Leonean politician

Alimamy Pallo Bangura is a politician in Sierra Leone. Over the past 12 years, Bangura has played a major role in Sierra Leonean politics and was a member of the Revolutionary United Front Party, where he replaced rebel leader Foday Sankoh following Sankoh's May 2000 arrest and 2002 electoral disqualification. His posts have included: Ambassador to the United Nations from Sierra Leone (1994–1996); Foreign Minister (1997–1998); Minister of Energy and Power (1999–2001); and Secretary General of the Revolutionary United Front Party (2002–2007). He also ran for president in 2002 alongside former cabinet minister Peter Vandy, but the pair only received 1.7% of the presidential vote, while the RUF received only 2.2% of the parliamentary vote.

== Education ==
Bangura holds a master's degree from the School of Oriental and African Studies, University of London.

== Political beliefs ==
The RUF was made famous for its brutal war tactics that included kidnapping and torture. However, Bangura sought to change the face of the party. He describes himself as a supporter of democracy and a Christian.
