= Parliament of Sierra Leone =

Unicameral legislature of Sierra Leone

Coordinates: 8.4806°N 13.2331°W

Type
- Type: Unicameral

Leadership
- Speaker: Segepoh Solomon Thomas, since 2 May 2024, SLPP
- Deputy Speakers: Foday Alhassan Kargbo; Gerald Caulker; Abdulay Umar Jalloh; Osman Ibrahim Sesay; Mustapha Alhaji Turay; Roger W. Koroma, SLPP
- Leader of the Opposition: Musa Juma Bangura, APC

Structure
- Seats: 149 (135 elected + 14 appointed)
- Political groups: Sierra Leone People's Party (81); All People's Congress (54); Paramount chiefs (14)

Elections
- Voting system: Party-list proportional representation
- Last election: 24 June 2023
- Next election: 2028

Meeting place
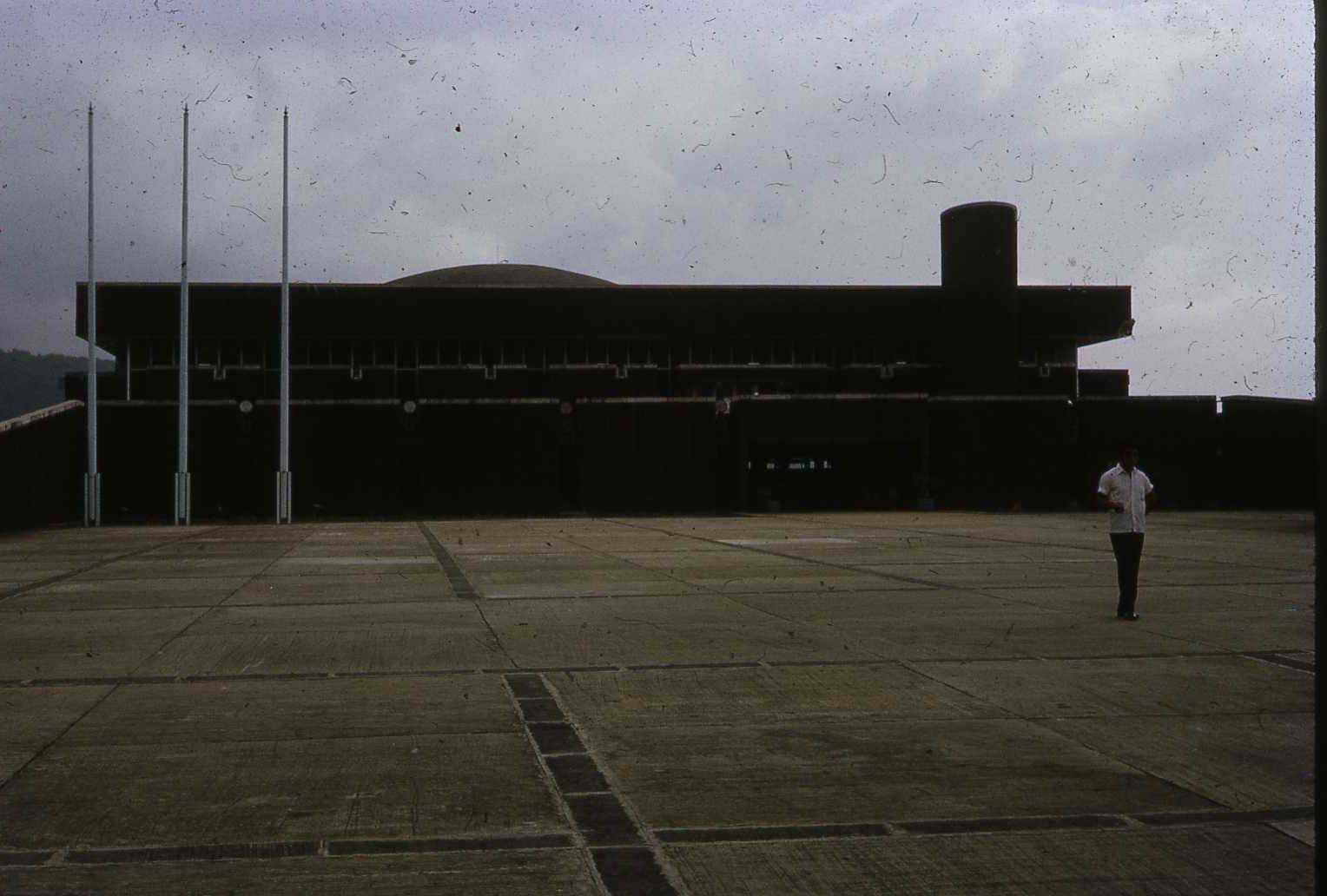
- House of Parliament, Tower Hill, Freetown

Website
- www.parliament.gov.sl

Parliament of Sierra Leone is the legislative branch of the government of Sierra Leone. It is principally responsible for making laws. The Sierra Leone parliament consists of 149 members, of which 135 members are directly elected from across Sierra Leone's 16 districts, while 14 are paramount chiefs appointed from the 14 rural districts. The parliament is led by the Speaker of the House; the position is currently held by Abass Bundu of the Sierra Leone People's Party. The current elected 135 ordinary members of parliament are composed of members of the All People's Congress and the Sierra Leone People's Party which are the two largest political parties in Sierra Leone.

== History ==
The Sierra Leone Parliament, like its counterparts in other former British colonies, began as a Legislative Council. It was inaugurated in 1863 but was renamed the House of Representatives in 1954. The first decade of Independence (1961 – 1971), often referred to as the golden age, was a momentous period in the country's Parliamentary evolution. When the British crown took management of the colony in 1808, no African was represented in the colony's administration; the governor, with a few white officials ruled the colony by a body known as the Governor's Advisory Council.

By the mid-nineteenth century, the Creoles were determined to have a say in government. A Committee of Correspondence, constituting a group of Creole businessmen was formed in 1853, and was later replaced by the Mercantile Association in 1858 with the primary objective of securing the right of political representation for Colony citizens. Petitions and newspapers to the Secretary of State for Colonies served as pressure, calling for a new constitution and an elected assembly for Sierra Leone. In the 1863 Constitution, the legislature was reorganized and inaugurated but with no provision made for popular representation.

The current Sierra Leone Parliament owes its origin to colonial constitutional developments dating as far back as to 1863 when attempts were made by the British colonial authorities to put in place Legislative and Executive Councils. However, these two councils were established; the executive and the legislative councils. The Executive Council constituted the following: the Governor, the Chief Justice, Queen's Advocate (Attorney-General), Colony Secretary, and the Officer Commanding Troops. These were known as the Official Members. The unofficial members were known as Charles Heddle, a European African and John Ezzidio a Sierra Leonean. Both the official and unofficial members constituted the Legislative Council which was responsible for enacting Laws for the colony. But too much of executive powers were vested in the Governor. Due to riots and strikes by railway workers, more anti-colonial pressure was mounted, which led to the formation of the National Congress for West Africa in 1920 with men like F.W Dove, a businessman and H.C Bankole Bright, a Medical Doctor. This congress demanded the following: a party-elected legislative council in each colony – this however met with failure even when the delegation was sent to London to press for action. The protectorate by then was legally regarded as a foreign country. This historic process was ongoing when the governor came to the scene by the name of Sir Ransford Slater. He was prepared to concede to the demand for popular representation but to him it was absurd to have a legislator for both colony and protectorate. To satisfy their demands, Governor Slater planned a new constitution in 1924 which conceded the elective principles for the colony, with some protectorate representation by chiefs. Under the tribal system no other would have adequate title to speak with authority. Membership of the legislature was increased to 21 with 3 (three) paramount chiefs. From the 21 Members, 11 were appointed by the Government added to 10 unofficial Members. Out of the 10 unofficial Members, were 5 Colony Representatives elected from among the educated Creole elites and the 3 Paramount Chiefs from the Protectorate nominated by the Governor. This registered a significant development for African representation in the Legislative Assembly. In 1951 further constitutional development was made by Governor Beresford Stoke, which increased the Paramount Chiefs representation in the Legislative assembly to 12, one, for each district, a practice that prevails today.

In the SLPP victory in 1951 election, some members were appointed to the Executive council. In 1954, The leader of the party Sir Milton Margai was made Chief Minister and the other members of the council became ministers.

After independence in 1961, Sierra Leone Parliament continued to evolve. It became a completely elected body. By then the office was located at the mechanized section of the Treasury Building, located at George Street in Freetown which was our first parliamentary building. Apart from the Paramount Chiefs that were indirectly elected through an Electoral College System, all Members of Parliament were elected by an electoral system, based on a single member constituency. The defining parameter for the delimitation of electoral boundaries was population quota, based on the most recent census results. Up to 1967, the SLPP which was the majority in Parliament, constituted the Executive. In 1968, after the controversial 1967 elections, the All Peoples Congress (APC) commanded the majority in Parliament. Under the leadership of Siaka Stevens,

The APC government undertook certain constitutional reforms that altered significantly the British set-up of the Sierra Leone Parliament. In 1971, Sierra Leone assumed a republican status with an Executive Presidency that doubled as Head of State and Government.

Parliament was most profoundly affected by this constitutional adjustment. The implication was that the Parliament would no longer be involved in the formation of the Executive. They became two separate arms of government.

Also, in 1978, Sierra Leone was transformed into a one-party state. This meant that Parliament was dominated by a single party. The APC became the only political party that was constitutionally recognized. All other parties were disbanded. Members of Parliament from the opposition SLPP had only two options amidst this constitutional change. They were to either switch allegiance to the APC and remain in Parliament or resign their seats. Most of them chose the former. Thus, from 1978 – 1992, the Sierra Leone Parliament was without an official opposition.

In 1992, the APC Government was toppled by the military. Sierra Leone was ushered into another period of military rule during which the activities of Parliament were indefinitely suspended.

The legislative role of Parliament was substituted with the passing of decrees by a military council. The period of inactivity by Parliament was brought to an end with the restoration of constitutionality in 1996.

The military yielded to pressure from within and without to return the state to civilian rule under a system of multiparty democracy.

There was however a review of the electoral system to determine membership in Parliament. The war inhibited the conduct of a census to determine the redistribution of constituencies. An ad hoc electoral arrangement was adopted to elect Members of Parliament in 1996. It was the Proportional Representation (PR) electoral system where parties rather than constituencies, determined election to parliamentary representation.

In 2002, the PR system of election was replaced by the District Block Electoral System (DBS). Both electoral systems did not adequately obligate MPs to their constituents as popularity within their parties was more important than popularity among constituents or the people.

The 2007 elections in Sierra Leone have been widely acclaimed as having been historical and significant in several senses, including their conduct along the lines of the first-past-the post-electoral system. The elections registered the reintroduction of the constituency electoral system that was interrupted by the exigencies of war between 1991 and 2002.

The current Parliament that emerged from the electoral system saw the first litmus test of the spirit and intent of the 1991 Constitution (Act No.6 of 1991). Section 38 (1) and (2) of the 1991 Constitution explicitly states that: “Sierra Leone shall be divided into such constituencies for the purpose of electing the Members of Parliament referred to in paragraph (b) of subsection (1) of section (74) of this Constitution as the Electoral Commission, acting with the approval of Parliament signified by resolution of Parliament, may prescribe.” “Every constituency established under this section shall return one Member of Parliament.”

The present Parliament is referred to as the Fourth Parliament of the Second Republic of Sierra Leone. This means that it is the Fourth Parliament since the restoration of constitutional rule in 1996. The first was in 1996, second, 2002, third, 2007 and fourth, 2012.

The change of parliaments is determined at every democratic election. The First Republic was in 1971, when Sierra Leone was officially declared a republic. The Second Republic was in 1996. The Sierra Leone Parliament has a total number of 124 MPs including the 112 elected through the first-past-the post electoral system and the 12 Paramount Chiefs, one from each of the twelve districts.

This is in compliance with section 74 (1) of the 1991 Constitution of Sierra Leone and in line with tradition inherited from colonial rule.

This constitutional provision states that each district in Sierra Leone shall have one Paramount Chief Representation, elected through a separate election. The parliamentary representation of the three parties in Parliament in the Third Parliament (2007-2012) was as follows: APC (59), SLPP (45) PMDC (10), Paramount Chiefs (12), and 16 women parliamentarians as against 108 male Members.

== Current Parliament ==
The Sixth Parliament of the Second Republic of Sierra Leone comprises the SLPP (81) and APC (54) seats with a total of 14 Paramount Chiefs.

== Establishment ==
There shall be a legislature of Sierra Leone which shall be known as Parliament, and shall consist of the President, the Speaker and Members of Parliament.

Subject to the provisions of the Constitution of Sierra Leone, the legislative power of Sierra Leone is vested in Parliament. Parliament may make laws for the peace, security, order and good government of Sierra Leone.

== Members of Parliament ==
Members of Parliament shall comprise the following: one Member of Parliament for each Constituency/District who shall, subject to the provisions of this Constitution, be elected in such manner as may be prescribed by or under any law from among the persons who, under any law, are for the time being Paramount Chiefs; and such number of Members as Parliament may prescribe who, subject to the provisions of this Constitution, shall be elected in such manner as may be prescribed by or under any law.

The number of Members of Parliament to be elected pursuant to paragraphs (a) and (b) of subsection(1) shall not together be less than sixty.

In any election of Members of Parliament the votes of the electors shall be given by ballot in such manner as not to disclose how any particular elector votes.

Members of Parliament shall be entitled to such salaries, allowances, gratuities, pensions and such other benefits as may be prescribed by Parliament.

== Qualifications for membership ==
Qualifications for Membership in Parliament Subject to the provisions of section 76, any person who: is a citizen of Sierra Leone (otherwise than by naturalization); and has attained the age of twenty-one years; and is an elector whose name is on a register of electors under the Franchise and Electoral Registration Act,1961, or under any Act of Parliament amending or replacing that Act; and is able to speak and to read the English Language with a degree of proficiency sufficient to enable him to take an active part in the proceedings of Parliament, shall be qualified for election as such a Member of Parliament: Provided that a person who becomes a citizen of Sierra Leone by registration by law shall not be qualified for election as such a Member of Parliament or of any Local Authority unless he shall have resided continuously in Sierra Leone for twenty-five years after such registration or shall have served in the Civil or Regular Armed Services of Sierra Leone for a continuous period of twenty-five years.

== Disqualifications for membership ==
No person shall be qualified for election as a Member of Parliament: if he is a naturalised citizen of Sierra Leone or is a citizen of a country other than Sierra Leone having become such a citizen voluntarily or is under a declaration of allegiance to such a country; or

if he is a member of any Commission established under this Constitution, or a member of the Armed Forces of the Republic, or a public officer, or an employee of a Public Corporation established by an Act of Parliament, or has been such a member, officer or employee within twelve months prior to the date on which he seeks to be elected to Parliament; or if under any law in force in Sierra Leone he is adjudged to be a lunatic or otherwise declared to be of unsound mind; or if he has been convicted and sentenced for an offence which involves fraud or dishonesty; or if he is under a sentence of death imposed on him by any court; or if in the case of the election of such member as is referred to in paragraph (b) of subsection (1) of section 74, he is for the time being a Paramount Chief under any law; or if being a person possessed of professional qualifications, he is disqualified (otherwise than at his own request) from practicing his profession in Sierra Leone by order of any competent authority made in respect of him personally within the immediately preceding five years of an election held in pursuance of section 87;or if he is for the time being the President, the vice-president, a Minister or a Deputy Minister under the provisions of this Constitution

A person shall not be qualified for election to Parliament if he is convicted by any court of any offence connected with the election of Members of Parliament: Provided that in any such case the period of disqualification shall not exceed a period of five years from the date of the general election following the one for which he was disqualified.

Any person who is the holder of any office the functions of which involve responsibility for, or in connection with, the conduct of any election to Parliament or the compilation of any register of voters for the purposes of such an election shall not be qualified for election to Parliament.

A person shall not be disqualified for election as a Member of Parliament under paragraph b) of subsection (1) by reason only that he holds the office of member of a Chiefdom Council, member of a Local Court or member of anybody corporate established by or under any of the following laws, that is to say, the Freetown Municipality Act, the Chiefdom Councils Act, the Rural Area Act, the District Councils Act, the Sherbro Urban District Council Act, the Bo Town Council Act, and the Townships Act or any law amending or replacing any of those laws.

Save as otherwise provided by Parliament, a person shall not be disqualified from being a Member of Parliament by reason only that he holds office as a member of a Statutory Corporation.

== Tenure of Members of Parliament ==
A Member of Parliament shall vacate his seat in Parliament: on the dissolution of Parliament next following his election or if he is elected Speaker of Parliament or if any other circumstances arise that if he were not a Member of Parliament would cause him to be disqualified for election as such under section 76, or if he ceases to be a citizen of Sierra Leone; or if he is absent from sittings of Parliament for such period and in such circumstances as may be prescribed in the rules of procedure of Parliament or if in the case of such a Member as is referred to in paragraph (b) of subsection (1) of section 74, he becomes a Paramount Chief under any law or if he ceases to be qualified under any law to be registered as an elector for election of Members to Parliament or if he is adjudged to be a lunatic or declared to be of unsound mind or sentenced to death; or if he is adjudged or otherwise declared a bankrupt under any law and has not been discharged; or if he resigns from office as a Member of Parliament by writing under his hand addressed to the Speaker, or if the Office of Speaker is vacant or the Speaker is absent from Sierra Leone, to the Deputy Speaker or if he ceases to be a member of the political party of which he was a member at the time of his election to Parliament and he so informs the Speaker, or the Speaker is so informed by the Leader of that political party or if by his conduct in Parliament by sitting and voting with members of a different party, the Speaker is satisfied after consultation with the Leader of that Member's party that the Member is no longer a member of the political party under whose symbol he was elected to Parliament or if, being elected to Parliament as an independent candidate, he joins a political party in Parliament or if he accepts office as Ambassador or High Commissioner for Sierra Leone or any position with an International or Regional Organization Any Member of Parliament who has been adjudged to be a lunatic, declared to be of unsound mind, or sentenced to death or imprisonment, may appeal against the decision in accordance with any law provided that the decision shall not have effect until the matter has been finally determined.

== Determination of question as to membership ==
The High Court shall have jurisdiction to hear and determine any question whether: any person has been validly elected as a Member of Parliament and the seat of a Member of Parliament has become vacant.

The High Court to which any question is brought under subsection (1) shall determine the said question and give judgment thereon within four months after the commencement of the proceedings before that Court.

An appeal shall lie to the Court of Appeal from the decision of the High Court on any matter determined pursuant to subsection (1), save that no appeal shall lie in respect of any interlocutory decisions of the High Court in such proceedings.

The Court of Appeal before which an appeal is brought pursuant to subsection (3) shall determine the appeal and give judgment thereon within four months after the appeal was filed. The decision of the Court of Appeal on any matter pursuant to subsection (3) shall be final and not be inquired into by any Court.

For the purpose of this section Parliament may make provision, or may authorise the making of provisions with respect to the practice and procedure of the High Court or the Court of Appeal, and may confer upon such Courts such powers or may authorise the conferment thereon of such powers as may appear to be necessary or desirable for the purpose of enabling the said Courts effectively to exercise the jurisdiction conferred upon them by this section or by any law relating to the hearing of appeals from the High Court.

== Oath ==
Every Member of Parliament shall, before taking his seat in Parliament, take and subscribe before Parliament the oath as set out in the Third Schedule, but a Member may, before taking that oath, take part in the election of a Speaker.

== Summoning, prorogation, and dissolution ==
Each session in Parliament shall be held at such place within Sierra Leone and shall commence at such time as the President may be Proclamation appoint.

There shall be a session of Parliament at least once in every year, so that a period of twelve months shall not intervene between the last sitting of Parliament in one session and the first sitting thereof in the next session: Provided that there shall be a session of Parliament not later than twenty-eight days from the holding of a general election of Members of Parliament.

The President shall at the beginning of each session of Parliament present to Parliament an address on the state of the nation.

== Life of Parliament ==
Parliament shall stand dissolved at the expiration of a period of five years commencing from the date of its first sitting after a general election.

If there is an existence, a state of public emergency in accordance with section 29 of this Constitution and the President considers it not practicable to hold elections, Parliament may, by resolution, extend the period of five years mentioned in subsection (1) from time to time but not beyond a period of six months at any one time.

== Sittings ==
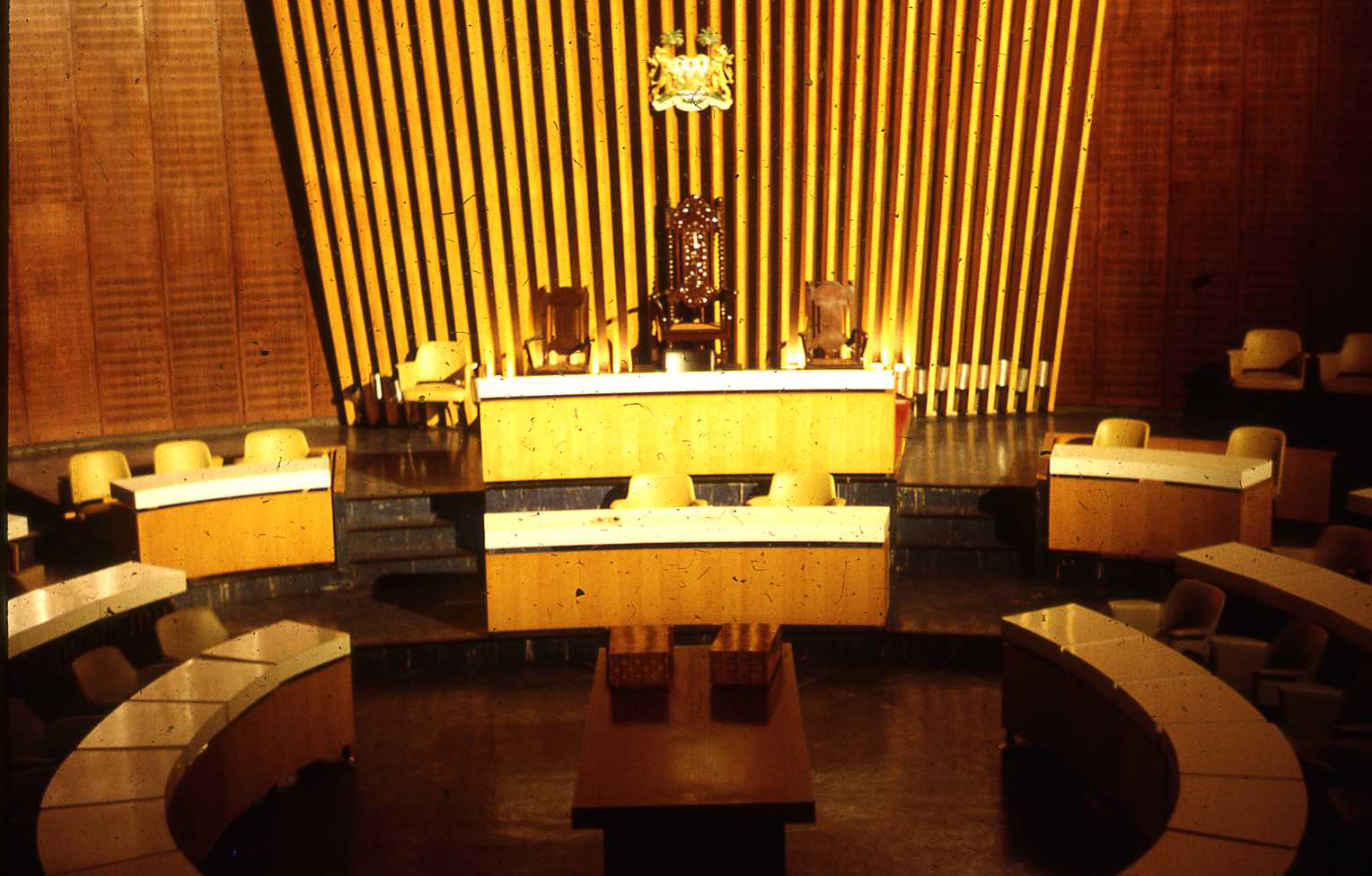
Chamber of the Parliament

The President may at any time summon a meeting of Parliament. Notwithstanding the provision of subsection (1), at least twenty per centum of all the Members of Parliament may request a meeting of Parliament and the Speaker shall, within fourteen days after the receipt of that request, summon a meeting of Parliament. Subject to the provisions of subsection (1) and of Sections 29 and 84 of this Constitution, sittings of Parliament in any session after the commencement of that session shall be held at such times and on such days as Parliament shall appoint. Parliament shall sit for a period of not less than one hundred and twenty days in each year.

== General elections ==
A general election of the Members of Parliament shall be held not earlier than thirty days and not later than ninety days after any dissolution of Parliament: Provided that nominations for such elections shall in no case be closed within fourteen days after dissolution.

If, when Parliament has been dissolved, the President considers that owing to the existence of a state of public emergency it would not be practicable to hold a general election within ninety days after the dissolution, the President may by Proclamation recall the Parliament that has been dissolved and the following provisions shall then have effect: the Parliament shall meet at such date, not later than fourteen days after the date of the Proclamation, as may be specified therein; the President shall, subject to the provisions of subsection (16) of section 29, cause to be introduced in Parliament as soon as it meets, a resolution declaring that a state of Public Emergency exists and subject as aforesaid, no other business shall be transacted in Parliament until that resolution has been passed or defeated; if the resolution is passed by Parliament with the support of the votes of not less than two-thirds of the Members thereof, a general election shall be held on the last day of the period of six months beginning with the date of the original dissolution of the Parliament which has been recalled or such earlier date as the President shall appoint, and the Parliament that has been recalled shall be deemed to be the Parliament for the time being and may meet and be kept in session accordingly until the date fixed for nomination of candidates in that general election, and unless previously dissolved, shall then stand dissolved; if the resolution is defeated or is passed with the support of the votes of less than two-thirds of the Members of Parliament or has not been put to the vote within five days after it has been introduced, the Parliament that has been recalled shall then be again dissolved and a general election shall be held not later than the ninetieth day after the date of the Proclamation by which the Parliament was so recalled or such earlier date as the President may by Proclamation appoint.

When Parliament is recalled under this section after having been dissolved: the session of that Parliament held next before that dissolution; and the session or sessions of that Parliament held between the date of its first sitting and of the next dissolution thereafter, shall be deemed together to form one session.

== Procedure ==
Presiding in Parliament There shall preside at any sitting of Parliament, the Speaker or in the absence of the Speaker, the Deputy Speaker or in the absence of the Speaker and the Deputy Speaker, such Member of Parliament as may be elected for that purpose,Provided that when the President addresses Parliament or attends in person, the Speaker shall leave his chair and no other person shall preside during such address or attendance.

== Quorum ==
If objection is taken by any Member of Parliament that there are present in Parliament (besides the person presiding) less than one-fourth of all the Members of Parliament and the person presiding shall be so satisfied he shall thereupon adjourn Parliament.

== Use of English ==
The business of Parliament shall be conducted in the English Language.

== Voting in Parliament ==
Except as otherwise provided in this Constitution, any question proposed for decision in Parliament shall be determined by a majority of the votes of the Members present and voting.

The person presiding in Parliament may cast a vote whenever necessary to avoid an equality of votes but shall not vote in any other case; if the person presiding does not exercise his casting vote the question proposed for discussion in Parliament shall be deemed to be rejected.

The rules of procedure of Parliament may provide that the vote of a Member upon a question in which he has a direct pecuniary interest shall be disallowed and if any such provision is made a Member whose vote is disallowed in accordance therewith shall be deemed not to have voted.

== Unqualified persons sitting or voting ==
Any person who sits or votes in Parliament knowing or having reasonable ground for knowing that he is not entitled to do so shall be liable to a penalty not exceeding one thousand Leones or such other sum as may be prescribed by Parliament for each day in which he so sits or votes in Parliament, which shall be recoverable by action in the High Court at the suit of the Attorney-General and Minister of Justice.

At the beginning of each session of Parliament, but in any case not later than twenty-one days thereafter, there shall be appointed from among its members the following Standing Committees, that is to say: Committees of Parliament the Legislative Committee; the Finance Committee; the Committee on Appointments and Public Service; the Foreign Affairs and International Co-operation Committee; the Public Accounts Committee; the Committee of Privileges; the Standing Orders Committee; such other Committees of Parliament as the rules of procedure of Parliament shall provide.

In addition to the Committees referred to in subsection (1), Parliament shall appoint other Committees which shall perform the functions specified in subsection (3).

It shall be the duty of any such Committee as is referred to in subsection (2) to investigate or inquire into the activities or administration of such Ministries or Departments as may be assigned to it, and such investigation or inquiry may extend to proposals for legislation.

Notwithstanding anything contained in subsections (1) and (2) Parliament may at any time appoint any other Committee to investigate any matter of public importance.

The composition of each of the Committees appointed under subsections (1), (2) and (4) shall, as much as possible, reflect the strength of the political parties and Independent Members in Parliament.

For the purposes of effectively performing its functions, each of the Committees shall have all such powers, rights and privileges as are vested in the High Court at a trial in respect of: enforcing the attendance of witnesses and examining them on oath, affirmation or otherwise; compelling the production of documents; and the issue of a commission or request to examine witnesses abroad.

== Regulation of procedure ==
Subject to the provisions of this Constitution, Parliament may regulate its own procedure, and may in particular make, amend and revoke Standing Orders for the orderly conduct of its own proceedings.

Notwithstanding anything to the contrary in this Constitution or in any other law contained, no decision, order or direction of Parliament or any of its Committees or the Speaker, relating to the rules of procedure of Parliament, or to the application or interpretation of such rules, or any act done or purporting to have been done by Parliament or by the Speaker under any rules of procedure, shall be inquired into by any court.

Parliament may act notwithstanding any vacancy in its membership (including any vacancy not filled when Parliament first meets after the entry into force of this Constitution or after any dissolution of Parliament) and the presence or participation of any person not entitled to be present at or to participate in the proceedings of Parliament shall not invalidate those proceedings.

Parliament may, for the purpose of the orderly and effective discharge of its business, make provision for the powers, privileges and immunities of Parliament, its Committees and the Members thereof.

== Contempt of Parliament ==
Any act or omission which obstructs or impedes Parliament in the performance of its functions, or which obstructs or impedes any Member or officer thereof in the discharge of his duties or affronts the dignity of Parliament, or which tends either directly or indirectly to produce such a result shall be a contempt of Parliament.

== Criminal proceedings ==
Where an act or omission which constitutes contempt of Parliament is an offence under the criminal law, the exercise by Parliament of the power to punish for contempt shall not be a bar to the institution of proceedings under the criminal law.

=== Leadership ===
- Speaker of Parliament

The Sierra Leone Parliament is led by the speaker of the parliament, who is overall the leader of parliament and is directly elected by his fellow sitting members of Parliament to be the speaker. The speaker is in charge of moderating debate in Parliament; introducing bills in parliament; making rulings in Parliament; leading negotiation with members of Parliament to pass bills; and announcing the results of votes passed by Parliament. The speaker is given the constitutional power to discipline members who break the rules of Parliament. The President of Sierra Leone work closely with the speaker of Parliament to help negotiate and pass a bill in the House of Parliament. The Speaker of Parliament always represents the majority party in Parliament and is often a key ally of the President, who is usually from the same party. The current speaker of Parliament is the Honourable Sheku Badara Bashiru Dumbuya from the ruling All People's Congress (APC).

He was newly elected following the passage into law of the Constitutional Amendment Act, 2013. which states that "The Speaker of Parliament shall be elected by the Members of Parliament from among persons who are- Members of Parliament and who had served as such for not less than five years; or Qualified to be Members of Parliament and who had served as such for not less than ten years”. And who are not less than forty years.

- Majority leader of Parliament

The Majority leader of Parliament of Sierra Leone is a member of Parliament who is elected by his fellow sitting members of Parliament to act as the Party's leader. The Majority leader is always from the majority party in Parliament. The majority leader keeps party members in Parliament in order and lead a negotiation with members of his own party to support a bill introduce in Parliament. The Majority leader is usually a long-term member of Parliament and is a key ally of the President of Sierra Leone, who are often from the same party. The President work closely with the majority leader to rally enough supports to pass a bill. The current Majority leader of Parliament is the Honourable Ibrahim Rassin Bundu from the ruling All People's Congress He was elected on 21 January 2014.

- Minority Leader of Parliament

The minority leader of Parliament is a member of Parliament who is elected by members of the minority parties in Parliament to act as their leader. The Minority leader of Parliament is always from the largest minority party in Parliament and is the main opposition to the majority or ruling party. The minority leader keeps member of the minority parties in order, usually to oppose a bill supported by members of the majority or ruling party. The President of Sierra Leone, the Speaker of Parliament, the Majority leader of Parliament closely work with the Minority leader of Parliament to rally enough support from the opposition parties to pass a bill. The Minority leader is often very critical of the president and the ruling party. The minority leader is about as influential in Parliament as the majority leader. The current Minority leader of Parliament is the Honourable Bernadette Lahai from the main opposition Sierra Leone People's Party. When the largest minority party becomes the majority in Parliament, the Minority leader almost always becomes the majority leader or even speaker of parliament.
