= Pritchard (surname) =

Pritchard is a surname of Cornish and Welsh origin. It is an anglicisation of the name ap Rhisiart, literally son of Richard. At the time of the British Census of 1881, its frequency was highest on Anglesey (over 30 times the national average), followed by Caernarfonshire, Brecknockshire, Herefordshire, Radnorshire, Denbighshire, Monmouthshire, Flintshire, Merioneth and Shropshire. The name Pritchard may refer to:

== People ==
- Ada Pritchard (1898–1993), Canadian politician
- AJ Pritchard, English professional dancer
- Albert Richard Pritchard (1863–1927), American businessman
- Alex Pritchard (born 1993), English footballer
- Alexander Pritchard (1825–1898), Australian politician
- Alexis Pritchard (born 1983), South-African-born New Zealand boxer
- Alf Pritchard (1920–1995), English footballer
- Alwynne Pritchard (born 1968), British composer
- Andrew Pritchard (1804–1882) an English microscopist
- Anthony Pritchard, Australian administrator
- Arthur Pritchard (1917–2005), Welsh footballer
- Benjamin D. Pritchard (1835–1907), American soldier
- Bianca Langham-Pritchard (born 1975), Australian field hockey player
- Bill Pritchard, English singer songwriter
- Bill Pritchard (priest) (1933–2021), Welsh Anglican priest
- Bosh Pritchard (1919–1996), American football player
- Bradley Pritchard (born 1985), Zimbabwean footballer
- Buddy Pritchard (born 1936), American baseball player and manager
- Catrin Pritchard, British cancer researcher
- Cecil Pritchard (1902–1966), international rugby union hooker
- Charles Pritchard (1808–1893), British astronomer
- Charlie Pritchard (1882–1916). Welsh international rugby player
- Chris Pritchard (born 1968), American murderer
- Chris Pritchard (cyclist) (born 1983), Scottish Cyclist
- Cliff Pritchard (1881–1954), Welsh international rugby player
- Curtis Pritchard (born 1996), English dancer and choreographer
- Dalton Pritchard (1921–2010), American color TV pioneer
- Darrin Pritchard (born 1966), Australian footballer
- David Pritchard (disambiguation)
- Deborah Pritchard (born 1977), British composer
- Devon Pritchard American businesswoman and 5th President of Nintendo of America
- E. E. Evans-Pritchard (1902–1973), English anthropologist
- Earl A. Pritchard (1884–?), American college sports coach
- Earl H. Pritchard (1907–1995), American sinologist
- Edward Pritchard (disambiguation), several people
- Edward William Pritchard (1825–1865), English doctor and murderer
- Edwin Pritchard (1889–1976), American track and field athlete
- Elaine Pritchard (1926–2012), English chess master
- Esther Pritchard (1840–1900), American minister and editor
- Esther Tuttle Pritchard (1840–1900), American minister, editor
- Ethel Pritchard (1880–1964), New Zealand military and civilian nurse
- Forrest Pritchard (born 1974), author and farmer
- Frank Pritchard (born 1983), Australian rugby league player
- Geoff Pritchard (born 1966), Australian rules footballer
- George Pritchard (missionary) (1796–1883), British missionary
- George H. Pritchard (football coach), American football coach
- George M. Pritchard (1886–1955), American lawyer and politician
- Graham Pritchard (1942–2019), English cricketer
- Gwynedd Pritchard (1924–2012)
- Hannah Pritchard (1711–1768), English actress
- Harold Arthur Prichard (1871–1947), British philosopher
- Harry Pritchard (1871–1953), rear admiral in the Royal Navy
- Hazel Pritchard (1913–1967), Australian cricketer
- Herman Pritchard (1883 – after 1942), American football player and coach
- Hilary Pritchard (1942–1996), a Manx film and television actress
- Howard Pritchard (born 1948), British footballer
- Hugh Pritchard, biathlon athlete for Great Britain at the 2002 Winter Olympics
- Huw O. Pritchard, Canadian chemist
- J. E. M. Pritchard (1889–1921) British aviator
- J. W. Pritchard (1903–?), Indian civil servant
- Jack Pritchard (furniture designer) (1899–1992), British furniture designer
- Jack Pritchard (footballer) (1918–2000), English footballer
- James Pritchard (disambiguation), several people
- Janine Pritchard, Supreme Court justice, Western Australia
- Jeter Connelly Pritchard (1857–1921), American politician
- Jim Pritchard (1948–2014), Canadian ice hockey player
- Joe Pritchard, American football coach
- Joel Pritchard (1925–1977), American politician
- John Pritchard (disambiguation), several people
- Jonathan K. Pritchard, English-born professor of genetics
- Josh Pritchard (born 1992), Welsh footballer
- Katharine Susannah Prichard, Australian author and co-founding member of the Communist Party of Australia
- Kathleen I. Pritchard, Canadian oncologist
- Kathryn Pritchard, British figure skating partner of Jason Briggs
- Kaysa Pritchard (born 1994), Australian Rugby League player
- Keith Pritchard, American politician
- Kevin Pritchard (born 1967), American basketball player
- Lauren Pritchard (disambiguation)
- Lex Pritchard (born 1954), Australian rules footballer
- Linda Pritchard (born 1983), Swedish singer and dancer
- Luke Pritchard (born 1985), British musician
- Margaret Pritchard, Welsh radio and television broadcaster
- Marian Pritchard (1869–1945), early fashion journalist and author
- Marion Pritchard (1920–2016), Dutch-American social worker
- Mark Pritchard (disambiguation), multiple people
- Martin Pritchard (born 1959), Australian politician
- Mathew Pritchard (born 1973), Welsh skateboarder and celebrity chef
- Matthew Pritchard (1669–1750), Roman Catholic bishop
- Melissa Pritchard, American author and journalist
- Michael Pritchard (born 1972), American musician
- Mike Pritchard (born 1969), American football player
- Norman Pritchard (1875–1929), Anglo-Indian athlete and actor
- Paul Pritchard (born 1967), British climber
- Payton Pritchard (born 1998), American basketball player
- Peter Pritchard (1943–2020), zoologist
- Phil Pritchard (ice hockey) (born 1960 or 1961), Canadian hockey administrator
- Robert W. Pritchard, American politician
- Ron Pritchard (born 1947), American football player
- Ross Pritchard (1924–2020), American academic administrator
- Russell Pritchard (born 1979), British musician
- Sara B. Pritchard (born 1972), American historian of technology and environmental historian
- Tavita Pritchard (born 1987), American football coach
- Thomas Farnolls Pritchard (c. 1723–1777), English architect
- Tom Pritchard (1917–2017), New Zealand cricketer
- Urban Pritchard (1845–1925), British otologist
- Wendy Pritchard (born 1949), Australian hockey player
- Wesley Pritchard, American singer
- William Pritchard (American football) (1901–1978), American football coach
- William Arthur "Bill" Pritchard (1888–1981), Canadian socialist politician and publisher
- William H. Pritchard (born 1932), American academic and literary critic

== See also ==
- Prichard (disambiguation)
- Pritchard (disambiguation)
