= April 1968 =

Month of 1968

<<	April 1968					>>
Su	Mo	Tu	We	Th	Fr	Sa
	1	2	3	4	5	6
7	8	9	10	11	12	13
14	15	16	17	18	19	20
21	22	23	24	25	26	27
28	29	30

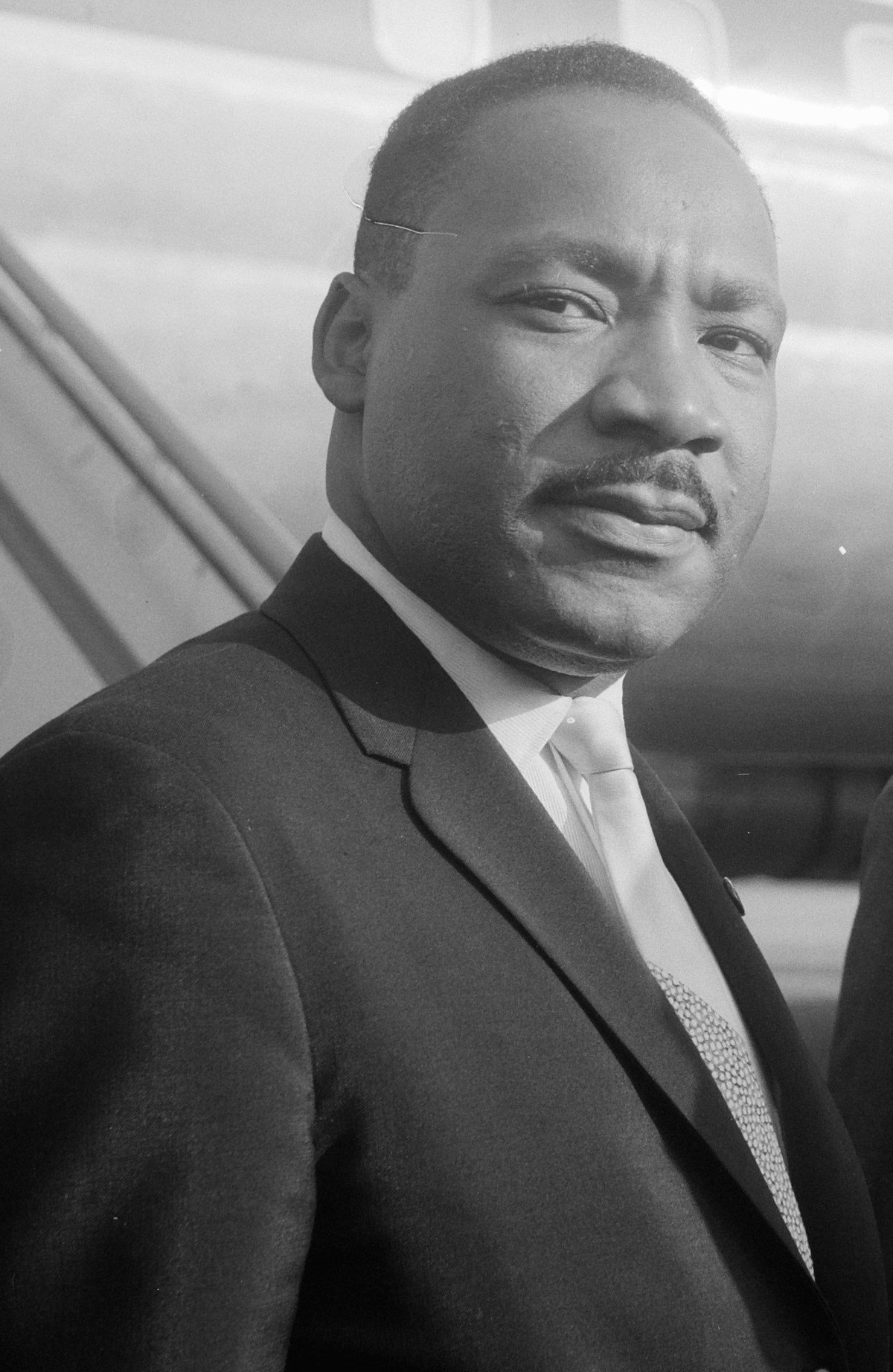
April 4, 1968: Reverend Dr. Martin Luther King Jr. is assassinated

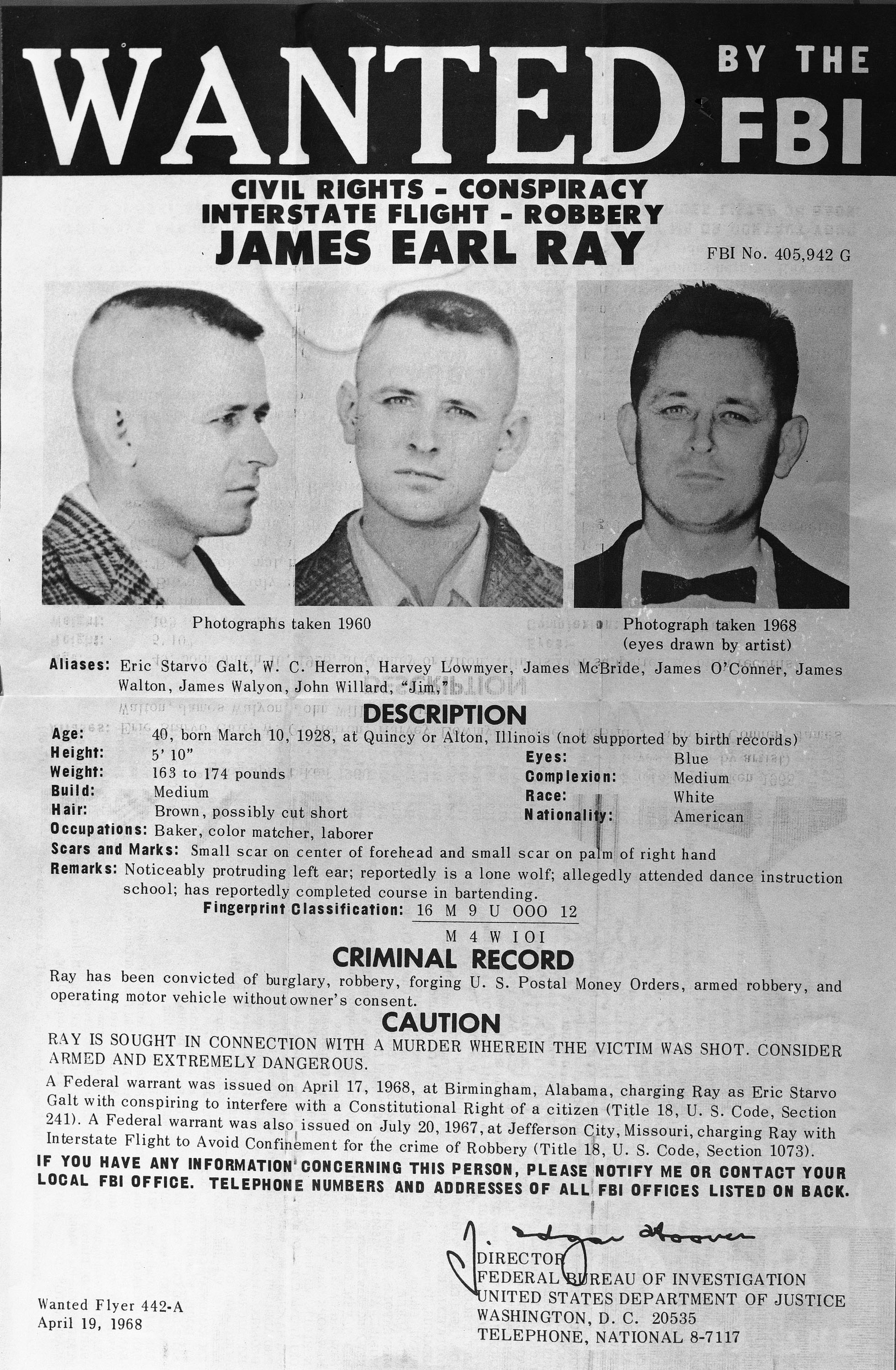
April 20, 1968: FBI identifies King's accused assassin

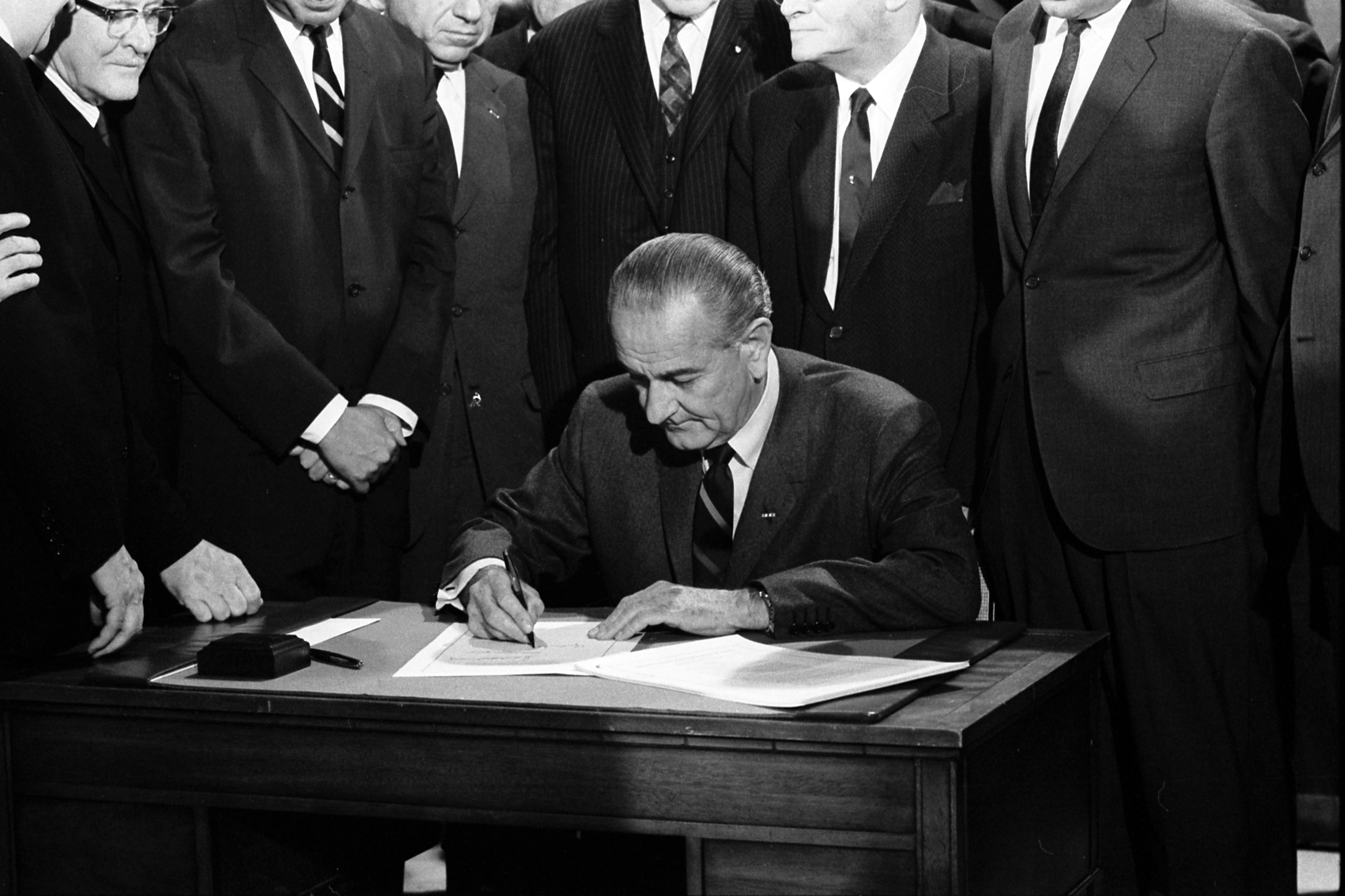
April 11, 1968: U.S. President Lyndon B. Johnson signs the Civil Rights Bill of 1968

The following events occurred in April 1968:

== April 1, 1968 (Monday) ==
- The 249th and final original episode of The Andy Griffith Show was aired on CBS, two days after Andy Griffith's retirement was revealed to the general public. The final episode was a pilot for Mayberry R.F.D., with the focus on Ken Berry in his fourth appearance as "Sam Jones". Griffith would make a final appearance as Andy Taylor in the series premiere of Mayberry R.F.D.
- American bombers halted further aerial bombardment of those portions of North Vietnam that were north of the 20th parallel, an area which included Hanoi and Haiphong. Missions would continue for the remainder of the country, between the 17th parallel and 20th parallel.
- An earthquake of 7.5 magnitude M_{w} took place in Japan, its epicenter located in Hyūga-nada Sea, off the islands of Kyushu and Shikoku, and was followed by a tsunami. The quake struck at 9:44 a.m. local time and reportedly killed one person and injured 22 others.
- The Abukuma Express Line was opened in Japan.
- Born:
  - Andreas Schnaas, German horror film director known for the Violent Shit film series; in Hamburg
  - Julia Boutros, Lebanese pop music star; in Beirut
- Died: Lev Davidovich Landau, 60, Soviet physicist and Nobel Prize laureate, died from injuries sustained in a car accident six years earlier

== April 2, 1968 (Tuesday) ==
- Two days after U.S. President Lyndon Johnson announced his interest in beginning peace talks to end the Vietnam War, North Vietnam's official government radio station responded that "The North Vietnamese government declares its readiness to send its representatives to make contact with U.S. representatives to decide with the U.S. side the unconditional cessation of bombing and all other war acts... so that talks could begin."
- In Italy, RAI broadcast the first episode of the miniseries La famiglia Benvenuti (The Benvenuti family), by Alfredo Giannetti, with Enrico Maria Salerno and Valeria Valeri, about the life of the Italian middle class. The show, innovative at that time, was received well by the public and critics alike, and the child actor Giusva Fioravanti (later infamous right-wing terrorist) became a star.
- Andreas Baader and Gudrun Ensslin firebombed two department stores in Frankfurt-am-Main in West Germany, attacking the Kaufhaus Schneider store and the Kaufhol store in the early morning hours after the stores had closed. They were arrested two days later, but would be released in 1969 and form the Baader-Meinhof Gang with Ulrike Meinhof.
- In the United States, NBC broadcast a television special in which British singer Petula Clark appeared with Harry Belafonte as her guest. An innocent, affectionate gesture between the two during a song (Clark touched Belafonte on the arm) had prompted concern from the show's sponsor (Chrysler Corporation) due to the difference in their races.
- At a meeting in Fort Lamy (now N'Djamena), the capital of Chad, President François Tombalbaye hosted President Alphonse Massamba-Débat of the Republic of the Congo and President Jean-Bédel Bokassa of the Central African Republic as the three nations created the Union of Central African States.
- Our Lady of Zeitoun, a Marian apparition, was first witnessed. The apparition of the Virgin Mary was seen on the roof of the Church of Saint Mary, a Coptic Christian church in the Zeitoun section of the Egyptian capital, Cairo, and would continue to return for several months.
- The Batallón de Paracaidistas Nº1, popularly known as "Pelantarú", was created as the first Special forces unit in Chile.
- Stanley Kubrick's classic science fiction film 2001: A Space Odyssey premiered at the Uptown Theater in Washington, D.C.
- Born: Hasan Nuhanović, Bosniak anti-genocide activist; in Zvornik, SFR Bosnia and Herzegovina, Yugoslavia

== April 3, 1968 (Wednesday) ==
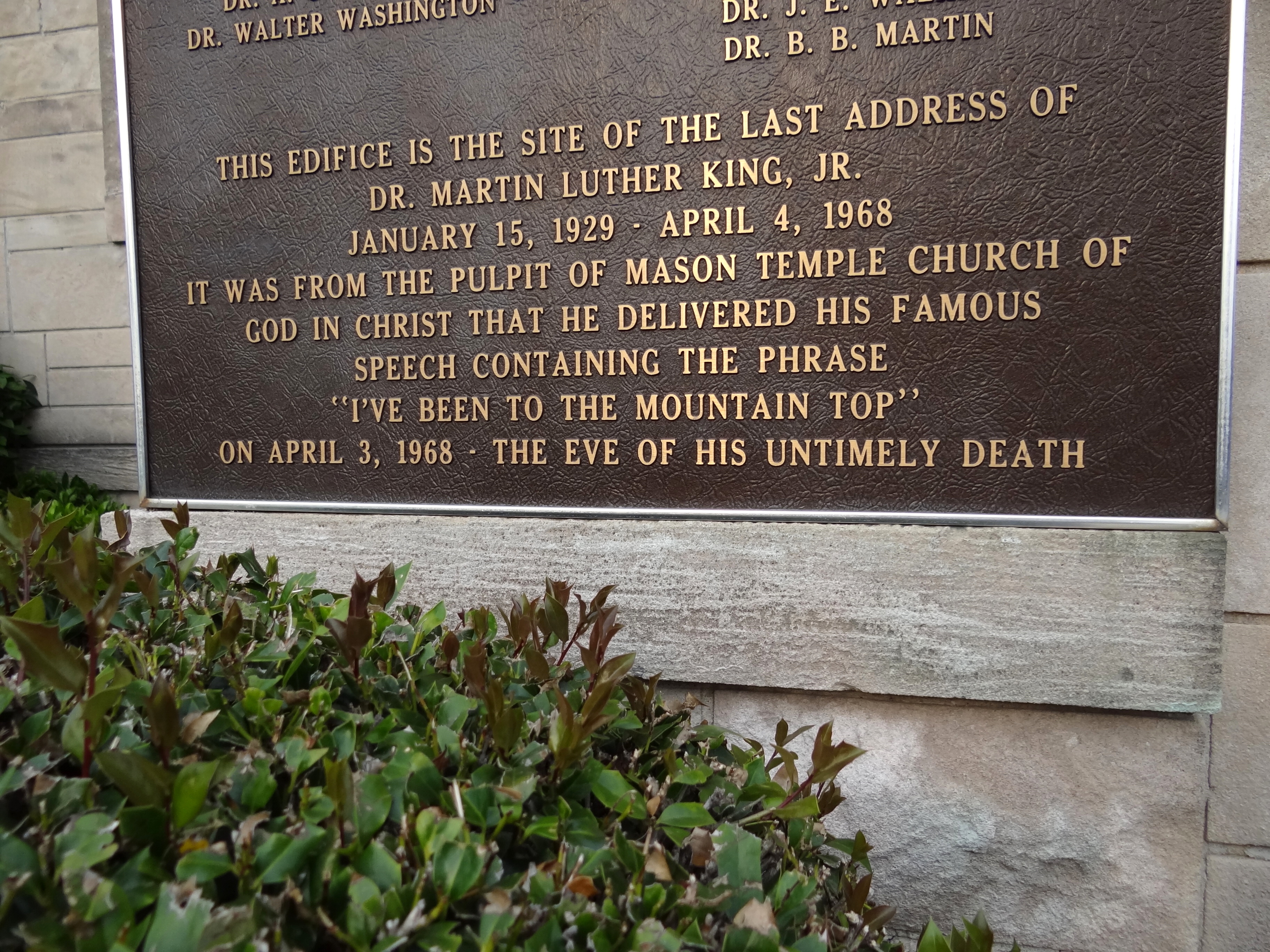
The plaque outside the Mason Temple at Memphis

- American civil rights leader Martin Luther King Jr. delivered his final speech, later known as "I've Been to the Mountaintop", in the Mason Temple in Memphis, Tennessee in what was later described as "in many respects, a summary of the cause to which King had dedicated his life" and "An eerie prescience of his death". Commenting about a prior stabbing and about threats to his life, he asked "What would happen to me from some of our sick white brothers? Well, I don't know what will happen now... But it really doesn't matter with me now, because I've been to the mountaintop."
- On the same day, at the request of Mayor Henry Loeb of Memphis, U.S. District Judge Bailey Brown issued a temporary restraining order to prohibit King's plan to lead a march of 6,000 men through Memphis on April 8. King announced that he would ignore the order, telling the press "We are not going to be stopped by Mace or injunctions or any other method that the city plans to use." King's attorneys appeared in court the next morning for a hearing to set aside the injunction.
- Following discussions at the Manned Space Flight Management Council meeting at Kennedy Space Center (KSC) on March 21–24, Associate Administrator for Manned Space Flight George E. Mueller and Manned Spacecraft Center (MSC) Director Robert R. Gilruth concluded between April 3 and 15 that, with the stringent funding restraints facing the Apollo Applications Program (AAP), the most practical near-term program was a Saturn IB Orbital Workshop (OWS) designed to simplify operational modes and techniques in Earth orbit.
- The first round of the 22nd annual draft of the National Basketball Association was held. Wes Unseld was the first choice, picked by the Baltimore Bullets.
- Born: Jamie Hewlett, British artist, songwriter, and co-creator of Tank Girl and the virtual band Gorillaz; in Hawarden, Flintshire, Wales

== April 4, 1968 (Thursday) ==
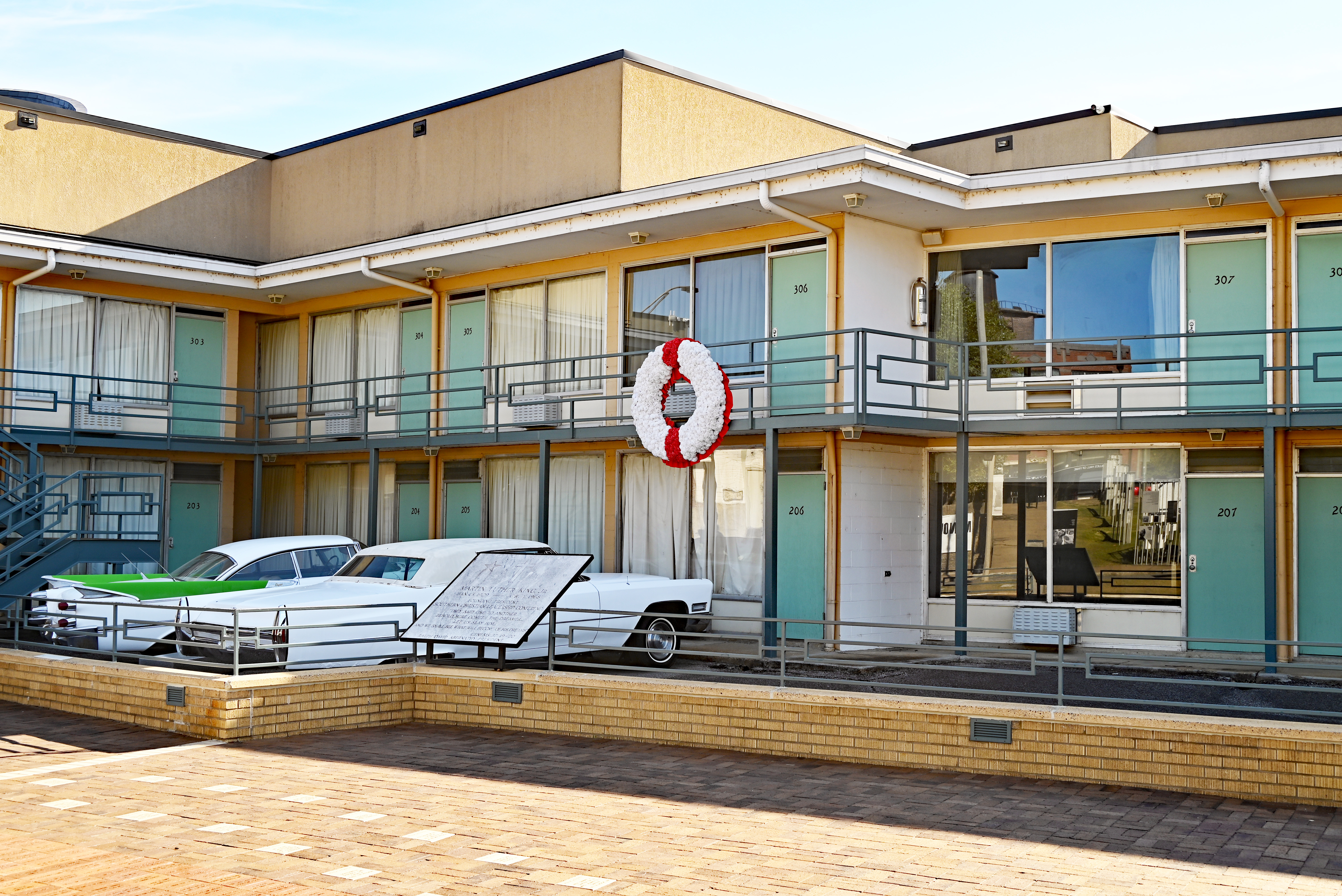
The balcony outside Room 306

- American civil rights leader Martin Luther King Jr. was assassinated as he stood on a balcony at the Lorraine Motel in Memphis, Tennessee. King and his associate, Ralph Abernathy, had been staying at Room 306 of the motel. James Earl Ray had rented a room at a boarding house that had a view of the motel. At 6:01 in the evening, King was preparing to go to dinner with his associates and was walking back into the room to get his overcoat. At that moment, Ray allegedly fired a single shot from a .30-06 rifle, and the bullet struck King in the neck. King was rushed to St. Joseph's Hospital and pronounced dead at 7:05. The powerful figure, described as a weapon of non-violence, died at the age of 39.
- On the same day, U.S. Senator Robert F. Kennedy went ahead with a rally in Indianapolis, where he gave a short but powerful speech that is sometimes credited with having limited the rioting that would be seen in many other American cities immediately following the assassination.
- NASA launched the uncrewed Apollo 6 from Cape Kennedy at 7:00 a.m. as the second test flight of the Saturn V launch vehicle. The rocket propelled a 28-ton CSM (Command/Service Module) and a mock-up of the 17-ton Apollo Lunar Module into earth orbit, but the premature shutdown of two second stage engines and the overcompensation of other engines put the vehicles into an altitude "110 miles too high" and consumed most of the fuel that would have been necessary to propel the craft out of Earth orbit and to the Moon. "If the Apollo 6 had carried men," an AP report noted, "a mission to the moon would have been aborted." The craft re-entered the atmosphere almost 10 hours after its launch; the USS Okinawa (LPH-3) recovered it in the Pacific Ocean.
- Jozef Lenárt, who had been Prime Minister of Czechoslovakia since 1963, resigned along with his cabinet in the wake of the reforms of the Prague Spring. The Central Committee of the Czechoslovak Communist Party asked Lenart to step down at an evening meeting, where its members took an unprecedented vote by secret ballot. The Central Committee appointed Deputy Prime Minister Oldrich Cernik to succeed Lenart.
- The Reverend Terence Cooke was installed as the new Roman Catholic Archbishop of New York in an investiture ceremony that began at 1:00 p.m. at St. Patrick's Cathedral in Manhattan.
- The Broadway musical The Education of H*Y*M*A*N K*A*P*L*A*N opened at the Alvin Theatre in New York City. Mayor John Lindsay and other audience members learned of Martin Luther King Jr.'s assassination at the intermission, causing many of them to leave the theater. The show would run for only 28 performances before closing.
- Died: Erno Crisa, 54, Italian character actor

== April 5, 1968 (Friday) ==
- In protest against the lack of an aerial display to commemorate the 50th anniversary of the founding of the Royal Air Force four days earlier, and as a gesture against the British government, Flight Lieutenant Alan Pollock of No. 1 Squadron RAF flew a jet fighter under the top span of Tower Bridge, making an unauthorized display flight in a Hawker Hunter and marking the first jet flight under the bridge. Pollock was arrested upon his return to base, and was subsequently retired from the RAF for health reasons.
- Rioting broke out in Chicago after the assassination of Martin Luther King Jr. on the previous day, leading to 11 deaths and more than 2,000 arrests. Violence was reported in 41 cities in the U.S., with fatalities in Chicago, Washington, Detroit, New York, Minneapolis, Memphis, and Tallahassee. By Sunday, there would be 85 cities hit by violence, 30 people killed, and at least 2,000 injured.
- At the instigation of Governor Spiro Agnew, Maryland National Guard troops were activated in anticipation of rioting in Baltimore and suburban Washington, D.C. On April 14, Agnew declared the state of emergency in Baltimore over and stood down the National Guard.
- The United States returned Iwo Jima and the other Bonin Islands to Japanese sovereignty, 23 years after the Battle of Iwo Jima that claimed 6,800 American and 19,000 Japanese lives.
- Born:
  - Diamond D (stage name for Joseph Kirkland), American rapper, record producer and member of hip hop group D.I.T.C.; in The Bronx
  - Paula Cole, American singer and songwriter; in Rockport, Massachusetts
  - Stewart Lee, English stand-up comedian; in Wellington, Shropshire

== April 6, 1968 (Saturday) ==
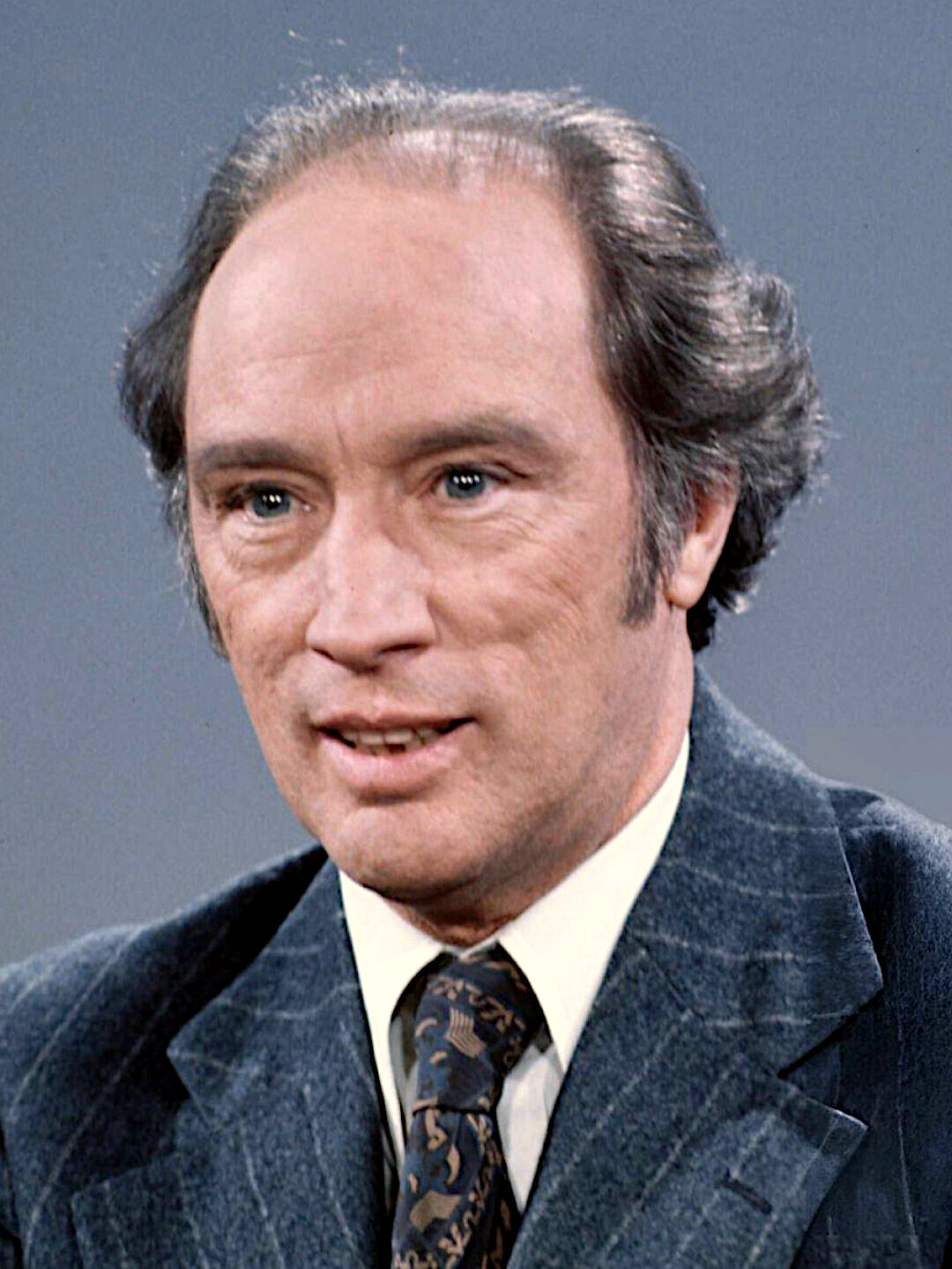
Prime Minister Trudeau

- Justice Minister Pierre Trudeau won the delegate voting for leadership of Canada's ruling Liberal Party, getting the required majority on the fourth ballot and the right to become the new Prime Minister of Canada. Trudeau got 752 of 2,390 votes (31.5%) on the first round as one of 9 candidates, and Trade and Commerce Minister Robert Winters was second with 293. On the final ballot, Trudeau had 1,203 votes, Winters had 954 and future Prime Minister John Turner had 195.
- Rioting broke out in Baltimore after a peaceful memorial service for Dr. Martin Luther King Jr. ended. A crowd gathered on Gay Street in East Baltimore, and by 5 p.m., windows were being smashed and police moved in. The city declared a 10 p.m. curfew and sales of alcohol and firearms were banned. The crowd moved north on Gay Street up to Harford Road and Greenmount Avenue. Mayor Thomas L. J. D'Alesandro III was unable to respond effectively. Around 8 p.m., Governor Agnew declared a state of emergency.
- A double explosion in downtown Richmond, Indiana killed 41 people and injured over 100. The initial blast at 1:45 p.m. was from a leaking natural gas pipe at East Main and South 6th Street. The resulting fire at a sporting goods store and gun shop then caused the explosion of gunpowder stored in the basement, and spread to three other businesses at the intersection.
- HemisFair, a six-month World's Fair to celebrate the nations of the Western Hemisphere, opened as scheduled in San Antonio, Texas to coincide with the city's 250th anniversary. The exposition lost six million dollars, but the construction that it generated would help spur the growth of San Antonio from 650,000 residents to nearly 1.5 million, the seventh most populated city in the United States. The 750-foot (230 m) tall Tower of the Americas still remains from the original fair.
- Voters in East Germany overwhelmingly approved a new constitution, with a reported 98.1% turnout and a vote of 96.4% in favor (11,536,265 for and 409,329 against).
- "La, la, la", sung by Massiel (music and lyrics by Manuel de la Calva and Ramón Arcusa), won the Eurovision Song Contest 1968 for Spain. It was also the first time the contest had been televised in color.
- Died: Bobby Hutton, 17, a member of the Black Panther Party, was killed in a shootout between Black Panthers and Oakland police in California

== April 7, 1968 (Sunday) ==
- A national day of mourning for Rev. Martin Luther King Jr. took place in the United States. Nina Simone dedicated her performance at Westbury Music Fair to Dr. King. Written for the occasion by Gene Taylor, the song "Why? (the King of Love Is Dead)" was performed for the first time.
- Jacky Ickx and Brian Redman won the first of 8 rounds of the 1968 British Sports Car Championship (which would conclude on September 2) at Brands Hatch in a Ford GT40.
- Parliamentary elections in Lebanon ended and "independent" candidates won the majority of seats. The voter turnout was 49.6%.
- Luna 14 was launched by the Soviet Union and placed into orbit around the Moon three days later to map gravitational anomalies.

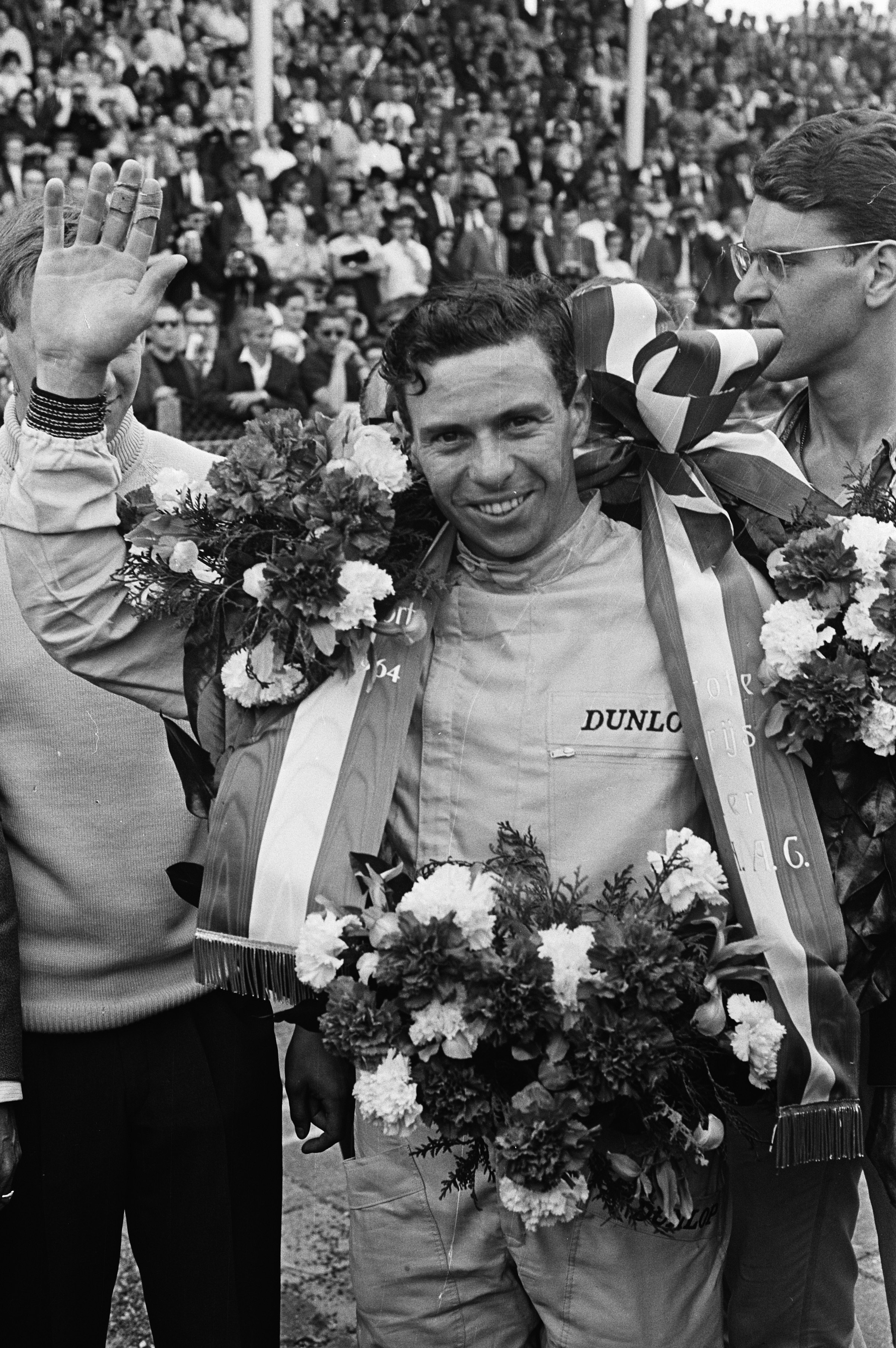
Clark

- Died: Jim Clark, 32, Scottish racing driver and twice racing world champion, was killed while competing in the 1968 Deutschland Trophäe, a Formula 2 auto race, at the Hockenheimring in West Germany. Clark was driving at top speed on a straightaway during the rain when he lost control. His Lotus-Ford 48 suddenly veered off the track and flipped into trees in an adjacent forest, and Clark died instantly from a broken neck and multiple skull fractures.

== April 8, 1968 (Monday) ==
- Five people aboard BOAC Flight 712 were killed in a fire after the Boeing 707 lost an engine following takeoff from London Heathrow Airport. Despite a successful emergency landing, the fire spread, although another 122 people survived. Among the injured were diplomat Katriel Katz and singer Mark Wynter. Flight attendant Barbara Jane Harrison, who remained on the plane to evacuate most of its passengers to the escape chute, was killed in the fire and would posthumously receive the George Cross for her heroism. Chief Steward Nevile Davis-Gordon would be awarded the British Empire Medal for Gallantry. Air traffic controller John Davis would be made a Member of the Order of the British Empire.
- U.S. Army Captain Max Cleland, who would later become the U.S. Administrator of Veterans Affairs and then a U.S. Senator for Georgia, was seriously wounded during the Battle of Khe Sanh as a victim of friendly fire. A carelessly handled grenade exploded behind him after one of his soldiers dropped it, and Cleland required the amputation of both legs above the knee, and his right forearm. Cleland would pursue a career in government service despite his disability.
- The U.S. Bureau of Narcotics and Dangerous Drugs became operational as an agency of the United States Department of Justice, combining the staffs of divisions from the Treasury Department (Federal Bureau of Narcotics) and the Food and Drug Administration (Bureau of Drug Abuse Control). In 1973, its functions would be taken over by the new Drug Enforcement Administration.
- What would eventually (in 1983) become Martin Luther King Jr. Day was first proposed, just four days after the civil rights leader was assassinated. U.S. Senator Edward W. Brooke of Massachusetts originally suggested that January 15 become an annual holiday. It is now observed on the third Monday of January every year.
- By a 6–2 decision in the case of United States v. Jackson (390 U.S. 570), the U.S. Supreme Court voided a law making kidnapping a capital offense. Since 1932, the Federal Kidnapping Act, better known as the "Lindbergh Law", had provided for the death penalty if the perpetrator had failed to let the victim go free.
- All 36 people on board LADECO Airlines Flight 213 were killed when the Chilean Douglas C-49K crashed into a mountain as it was making its approach to the city of Coyhaique on a flight from Santiago.
- The Soviet Army Group South, stationed in Hungary, received orders from Moscow to begin preparation for the invasion of Czechoslovakia.
- The final run of the Golden State passenger train on the Rock Island and Southern Pacific railroads left Los Angeles, California.
- Born: Patricia Arquette, American actress and the daughter of Lewis Arquette; in Chicago

== April 9, 1968 (Tuesday) ==
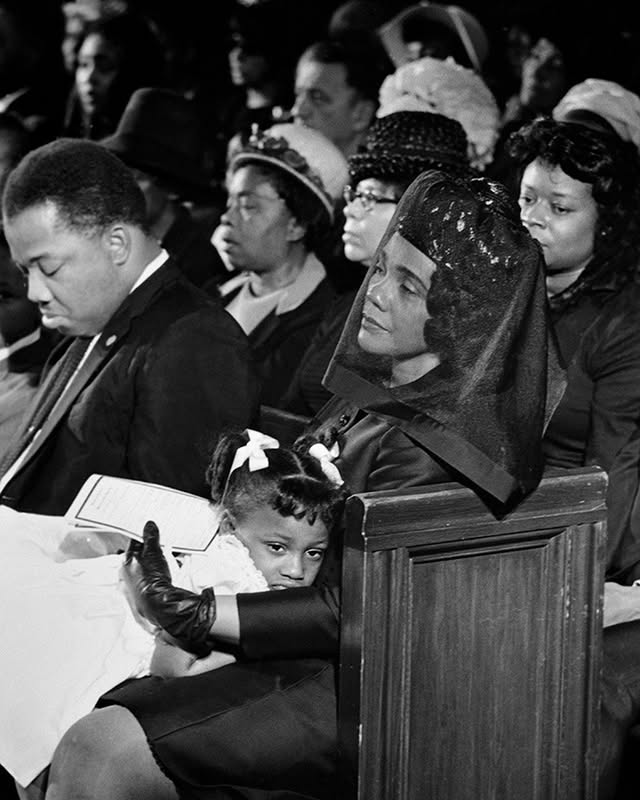
April 9, 1968: Coretta Scott King at her husband's funeral, comforting their daughter, Bernice

- Funeral services were held for Dr. Martin Luther King Jr. in Atlanta, beginning with a private service for family and friends at Ebenezer Baptist Church, where King and his father had both served as senior pastors. Those attending included Mahalia Jackson, who sang King's favorite hymn, "Take My Hand, Precious Lord". Afterward, a 3-mile (4.8 km) procession, observed by an estimated 150,000 people, was made to Morehouse College, King's alma mater, for a public service.
- The International Committee of the Red Cross (ICRC) made its first humanitarian aid flight to aid Biafra, arriving and departing by night on a poorly-lit airstrip. During the first three months of bringing supplies to relieve famine and disease in the west African area, the ICRC made one flight per week, for 13 in all.
- Born:
  - Jay Chandrasekhar, American actor, director and writer; in Chicago
  - Giovanni Piacentini, Italian association football player; in Modena
- Died: Mrs. Lorraine "Loree" Bailey, 58, the co-owner of the Lorraine Motel in Memphis and the inspiration for its name died from a stroke she had suffered just 2½ hours after King's assassination.

== April 10, 1968 (Wednesday) ==
- A crash killed 53 of the 744 people on the New Zealand inter-island ro-ro ferry TEV Wahine, when the vessel struck Barrett Reef at the mouth of Wellington Harbour. The disaster came in the wake of Cyclone Giselle, which created the windiest conditions ever recorded in New Zealand. Reportedly, most of the 691 survivors from the ferry "were saved by a Dunkirk-like flotilla of small boats which put out into the tumultuous seas" to effect the rescue.
- Jacobus J. Fouché was inaugurated to complete a 7-year term as the second President of South Africa in Cape Town, and rode in a post-inaugural military parade that took place despite a downpour. He would serve until February 21, 1975.

== April 11, 1968 (Thursday) ==
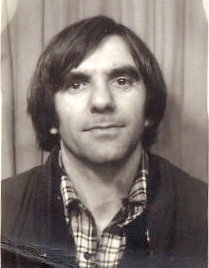
Dutschke

- Rudi Dutschke, the leader of the West German left-wing movement (APO), was seriously wounded in an assassination attempt by Josef Bachmann, who shot Dutschke twice in the head outside the Socialist German Student Union (Sozialistischer Deutscher Studentenbund, or SDS) offices on the Kurfürstendamm in West Berlin. Dutschke survived after emergency surgery, but would suffer seizures for the rest of his life and would die of his brain injuries 11 years later.
- U.S. President Lyndon B. Johnson signed the Civil Rights Act of 1968, which included the Fair Housing Act as its Title VIII section, into law. For the first time, it was a violation of federal law for a homeowner to refuse to sell or rent a dwelling to a person based upon race, color, religion, or national origin. A day earlier, the bill had been approved by the U.S. House of Representatives, 250 to 172, after clearing the U.S. Senate, 71–20, on March 11.
- Tampa, Florida, became the first city to rename a street as a legacy to Martin Luther King Jr., with the city council voting unanimously "to change the name of Main Street, between North Boulevard and MacDill Avenue to Dr. Martin Luther King Boulevard in honor of the assassinated Negro leader."
- German left-wing students blockaded the Springer Press HQ in Berlin and many were arrested, including Ulrike Meinhof, who would found the Baader-Meinhof Gang.

== April 12, 1968 (Friday) ==
- The Passover Seder was celebrated in the city of Hebron ten months after Israel had acquired the territory in the Six-Day War, and for the first time since the 1929 Hebron massacre. Over 40 Orthodox Jews gathered at the Al-Naher Al-Khaled Hotel (as the guests of the Palestinian Arab hotel owner, Fahed Al-Qwasmeh) after Rabbi Moshe Levinger had advertised the gathering in a newspaper advertisement. Although Israeli General Uzi Narkiss had granted Levinger's party permission to enter the Palestinian city on the agreement that they would depart the next day, the group hoisted the Israeli flag over the hotel and announced their plans to stay in town permanently. After moving from the hotel to a military compound on the edge of Hebron, the increasing number of Israeli settlers would establish Kiryat Arba, a permanent settlement on the West Bank, in 1970.
- The 36-story Kasumigaseki Building was opened in Tokyo as the first modern office skyscraper in Japan. It would remain the tallest building in Tokyo until 1970 when superseded by the World Trade Center (Tokyo).
- Born: Muhammad Khan Bhatti, Pakistani civil servant; in Mandi Bahauddin
- Died: Heinz Nordhoff, 69, CEO of Volkswagen who rebuilt the "people's car" company in West Germany after World War II

== April 13, 1968 (Saturday) ==
- Singapore held its first Parliamentary elections since becoming independent from Malaysia. The Barisan Sosialis (Socialist Front) and most of the lesser opposition political parties boycotted the voting, and the candidates of the People's Action Party won all 58 seats in Parliament.
- Tanzania became the first nation to give diplomatic recognition to the Republic of Biafra, which had seceded the year before from Nigeria. Gabon, Ivory Coast and Zambia would grant recognition the following month.
- A total lunar eclipse took place, the first of two during 1968, and was visible over nearly all of the Western Hemisphere.
- Born: Necrobutcher (stage name for Jørn Stubberud), Norwegian musician best known as the bassist in the black metal band Mayhem

== April 14, 1968 (Sunday) ==
- Golf's Masters Tournament was won by one stroke by Bob Goalby, even though he and Roberto De Vicenzo had both made 277 strokes on 72 holes. On the par-4 17th (and penultimate) hole, De Vicenzo had made a birdie (one stroke under the par-4, or three strokes overall), but his golfing partner, Tommy Aaron, had written "4" on the scorecard and added the score to 66. De Vicenzo then signed the card without noting the error, and rather than heading to an 18-hole playoff to break a 277–277 tie with Goalby, De Vicenzo was deemed under Masters Tournament rules to have finished in second place. Argentina-born De Vicenzo was a good sport about the loss by a technicality, and, in acknowledging that he had signed the scorecard without looking at it, commented to reporters, "What a stupid I am!".
- A nova of the star LV Vul, located within the region of the constellation Vulpecula, was observed on Earth for the first time. English astronomer George Alcock spotted the event nine months after he discovered Nova Delphini (HR Del) in 1967. The peak magnitude of LV Vul (4.8) would be observed on April 21.
- Infiltrators from North Korea crossed the demilitarized zone into South Korea and ambushed a United States Army truck carrying six soldiers about 800 yards away from Panmunjom, killing two Americans and two South Koreans. The other two occupants, both American, survived.
- The Soyuz test spacecraft Kosmos 212 was launched by the Soviet Union. The next day, Kosmos 213 was launched and the two uncrewed ships were linked together by remote commands from the Soviet Union.
- Born: Anthony Michael Hall, American film and television actor; in West Roxbury, Boston

== April 15, 1968 (Monday) ==
- The New York Mets and the Houston Astros went into extra innings in a game at the Astrodome, summarized by the headline in The Sporting News, "24 Innings, Six Hours, One Run". The game ended at 1:37 on Tuesday morning when Mets' shortstop Al Weis let a ground ball roll between his feet with the bases loaded, permitting the Astros' Norm Miller to score the winning run for the 1–0 victory. By then, less than 1,000 of the 14,219 paid customers were still watching.
- Born:
  - Alessio Vinci, Italian TV journalist for CNN and Mediaset; in Luxembourg
  - Perseo Miranda, Italian heavy metal singer; in Genoa
- Died:
  - Borys Lyatoshynsky, 73, Ukrainian composer
  - Henry Beston, 79, American author

== April 16, 1968 (Tuesday) ==
- In a speech before the National Space Club in Washington, AAP Director Charles W. Mathews stated that, beyond the goal of landing on the Moon, NASA's overall plan for human space exploration comprised "a balanced activity of lunar exploration and extension of man's capabilities in Earth orbit." The AAP, Mathews declared, contained sufficient flexibility so that it could be conducted in harmony with available resources: "We are also prepared to move forward at an increased pace when it is desirable and possible to do so." He said contingency planning left room for both budgetary and mission goal changes, thus answering congressional criticism that NASA had not provided sufficient flexibility regarding long-term goals.
- The Memphis sanitation strike, which had brought Martin Luther King Jr. to the site of his assassination, ended after 65 days with an agreement between the city of Memphis, Tennessee and its 1,300 garbage collectors. The men's right to organize a labor union took effect immediately, and effective May 1, sanitation workers, were to see a 10 cent per hour increase in their wages, which ranged from $1.65 to $2.10 per hour.
- A huge contingent of Italian neo-fascists began a “study trip” in Greece, organized by the colonels’ regime to teach the techniques of the false flag and of the coup d’état. Some of the “students”, including Pino Rauti and Stefano Delle Chiaie, would later be involved in the 1969 Piazza Fontana bombing.
- Born:
  - Vickie Guerrero, American professional wrestling celebrity; as Vickie Lynn Lara in El Paso, Texas
  - Martin Dahlin, Swedish National Team soccer football striker; in Uddevalla
- Died:
  - Albert Betz, 82, German physicist and aerospace engineering pioneer for his developments of wind turbine technology. The Betz limit equation (also known as Betz's law) for maximum capture of kinetic energy from wind was discovered by him in 1919.
  - Fay Bainter, 74, American film actress and Academy Award winner for her supporting role in the 1938 film Jezebel
  - Edna Ferber, 82, American novelist, playwright, and Pulitzer Prize winner
  - Nelly Corradi, 53, Italian opera singer and actress

== April 17, 1968 (Wednesday) ==
- The FBI identified a suspect in the assassination of Martin Luther King Jr., filing a request for an arrest warrant and releasing a photograph of fugitive "Eric Starvo Galt", which would turn out to be an alias for James Earl Ray. The warrant request, filed in Birmingham, Alabama, alleged a conspiracy between Galt "and an individual whom he alleged to be his brother". Following the granting of the warrant, police in Memphis, Tennessee, filed charges of murder against "Galt".
- In Gainesville, Florida, Floyd "Sonny" Tillman opened his first Sonny's BBQ restaurant. In the coming years, the chain would expand to over 130 restaurants across eight Southeastern states.
- A state election was held in South Australia. Steele Hall (Liberal and Country League) defeated Don Dunstan (ALP), and became the new Premier of South Australia.
- Born: Richie Woodhall, WBC super-middleweight boxing champion from 1998 to 1999; in Birmingham

== April 18, 1968 (Thursday) ==
- The famous London Bridge (specifically the 1831 "New" London Bridge designed by John Rennie the Elder) was sold to American entrepreneur Robert P. McCulloch as the McCulloch Oil Corporation paid $2,240,000 for the landmark. It would be shipped overseas to be rebuilt, and would reopen in Lake Havasu City, Arizona, in 1971.
- Born: David Hewlett, British-born Canadian television and film actor known for his portrayal of Dr. Rodney McKay in the Stargate SG-1 series; in Redhill, Surrey

== April 19, 1968 (Friday) ==
- Minnesota insurance agent Ralph Plaisted and three other members of his amateur exploration expedition became the first people to reach the North Pole by an overland route since 1909, and possibly the first ever, after completing a 474-mile, 44-day trip by snowmobiles. Plaisted, Walter H. Pederson, Gerald R. Pitzel and Jean Luc Bombardier (employed by Bombardier Inc. as a technician to service the Bombardier snowmobiles) arrived at the top of the world at 2100 UTC (3:00 p.m. in Minnesota). In later years, as historians came to doubt that Robert Peary's expedition had actually reached the North Pole on April 6, 1909, a historian would note that although "most of the media considered Plaisted's trek more of a stunt than the actual achievement that it was... it was Plaisted, the amateur explorer and insurance salesman from Duluth— and not Robert Peary— who was first to reach the Pole over the pack ice."
- Led by Sergeant Major John Amadu Bangura of the Army of Sierra Leone, a group of non-commissioned officers overthrew the military government of General Andrew Juxon-Smith and other members of the National Reformation Council who had staged a coup in 1967. Juxon-Smith and his deputy, Major William Leigh, were arrested and the mutineers set up a 14-member "National Interim Council" chaired by Warrant Officer First Class Patrick Conteh. Bangura pledged to restore civilian rule and to invited Sir Henry Lightfoot Boston, who had forced to leave after the 1967 coup, to reassume his role as Governor-General.
- In Valdagno (Vicenza) a strike at the Marzotto textile factory, to protest 400 layoffs, became a battle between workers (joined by some students) and police. The protesters knocked over the monument of the company founder, Gaetano Marzotto, and seized the villas of the estate managers. Dozens of protesters and policemen were injured and 42 workers were arrested. A week later, in solidarity with the strikers, most of the Valdagno town council resigns. The episode started the Hot Autumn, a season of hard conflicts in other Italian factories.
- Amby Burfoot won the 72nd Boston Marathon.
- Born: Ashley Judd, American actress and political activist; as Ashley Tyler Ciminella in Los Angeles
- Died: Major General Ronald Urquhart, 62, British Army officer and former commandant of the Royal Military Academy at Sandhurst

== April 20, 1968 (Saturday) ==
- British Conservative MP Enoch Powell made what would become known as the Rivers of Blood speech, criticising Commonwealth immigration and anti-discrimination legislation in the proposed Race Relations Act. Addressing the annual meeting of the West Midlands Conservative Political Centre in Birmingham, Powell did not use the phrase "rivers of blood" but quoted a section of Virgil's Aeneid and said that as he looked ahead, like the Roman author, "I seem to see 'the River Tiber foaming with much blood.'" (Bella, horrida bella, Et Thybrim multo spumantem sanguine), an allusion to a civil war brought on by the decline of an empire.
- The FBI placed the name of James Earl Ray, whom it had initially identified as "Eric Starvo Galt", on its "Ten Most Wanted Fugitives" List. The link to Ray, described as "a habitual criminal and escapee from the Mississippi State Prison", was made after a comparison of fingerprints at the scene to records of more than 53,000 convicted criminals. Since nobody was removed from the list, the naming of Ray marked the second time in FBI history that there were 11 people on the 10-person list. Four days later, the list would return to 10 after the arrest of fugitive Howard Callens Johnson.
- Pierre Trudeau was sworn in as the 15th Prime Minister of Canada, 48 hours ahead of the originally-scheduled Monday ceremony, in order to "make it possible for the new government to call an election on June 17 and be within the 58 days required by the election machinery". However, Trudeau adjourned his first cabinet meeting without taking action before the 7:00 p.m. deadline.
- South African Airways Flight 228 crashed just after its 9:00 p.m. takeoff from J. G. Strijdom International Airport in Windhoek, South West Africa (now Namibia), killing 123 of the 128 people on board. The destruction of the Boeing 707-344C jet Pretoria remains the deadliest aviation accident in Namibian history.
- MGM's classic film The Wizard of Oz made its NBC debut after having been telecast on CBS since 1956. It would remain on NBC for the next 8 years.
- Born:
  - Yelena Välbe, Russian Olympic cross-country skier, gold medalist in 1992, 1994 and 1998 Winter Olympics and winner of five consecutive world championships; in Magadan, Russian SFSR, Soviet Union
  - J. D. Roth, American game show host and reality show producer; as James David Weinroth in Cherry Hill, New Jersey
- Died: Rudolph Dirks, 91, German-American comic strip artist known for creating The Katzenjammer Kids, one of the earliest and most noted comic strips in history

== April 21, 1968 (Sunday) ==
- Enoch Powell was dismissed from the Shadow Cabinet by Opposition leader Edward Heath as a result of his "Rivers of Blood" speech of the previous day, despite several opinion polls suggesting that many of the public shared Powell's anti-immigrant views. Heath, a future Prime Minister, said in a statement that "I have told Mr. Powell that I consider the speech he made in Birmingham yesterday to have been racialist in tone, and liable to exacerbate racial tensions. This is unacceptable from one of the leaders of the Conservative Party..."

== April 22, 1968 (Monday) ==
- The Lebanese cargo ship Alheli (which had served in World War II as the Liberty ship SS Henry Dodge) was abandoned in the North Atlantic Ocean after springing a leak while en route from Almería to Wilmington, Delaware with a cargo of fluorspar. All 26 members of the crew were rescued by a British freighter, the Megantic, 900 miles east of Bermuda, and were then transferred to the U.S. Coast Guard cutter USCGC Mendota. The Alheli would sink to the bottom of the sea two days later at 33°15′N 45°50′W.
- Civilian government was partially restored to the West African nation of Sierra Leone, three days after a coup overthrew the military government, as Chairman Patrick Conteh of the National Interim Council yielded to Chief Justice Banja Tejan-Sie as the nation's acting Governor-General. Tejan-Sie would continue in that role until his dismissal on March 31, 1971.
- The United Nations Agreement on the Rescue of Astronauts, the Return of Astronauts and the Return of Objects Launched into Outer Space, conventionally known as the Rescue Agreement, was signed by the United States, the Soviet Union, and other nations. It would enter into force on December 3, 1968.
- The Treaty of Tlatelolco, a pledge by most of the nations of the Western Hemisphere agreeing to ban "the testing, use, manufacture, production or acquisition by any means or type" of nuclear weapons within their countries, went into effect. It had been signed in Mexico City on February 14, 1967.
- Died: Stephen H. Sholes, 57, American record producer for RCA Victor, died from a heart attack

== April 23, 1968 (Tuesday) ==
- The United Methodist Church was established in the United States by the merger of the former Methodist Church and the Evangelical United Brethren Church. At Dallas Memorial Auditorium, a crowd of 10,000 members of both churches joined hands and repeated the proclamation "Lord of the Church, we are united in Thee, in thy Church, and now in the United Methodist Church". EUBC bishop Reuben Mueller and Methodist bishop Lloyd Wicke led the proclamation ceremony accepting the 307-page Plan of Union.
- The Soviet Union made an unsuccessful launch of an uncrewed Zond space capsule that was intended to orbit the Moon as the next step in testing a Soviet crewed lunar mission. Three minutes and 15 seconds after the launch, the Zond's escape system activated inadvertently, shutting down the rocket engines and jettisoning the capsule back to Earth. The vehicle was recovered, intact, 520 kilometres (320 miles) away from the launch site, but the next attempt could not be launched for three months.
- The murder of Roy Tutill occurred in Surrey, England. The victim was a 14-year-old schoolboy who was raped and murdered on his way home from school. The murder went unsolved for 33 years.
- Canada's Prime Minister Trudeau asked Governor-General Roland Michener to dissolve Parliament and to schedule a general election for June 25.
- Born:
  - Timothy McVeigh, American domestic terrorist known for the 1995 Oklahoma City bombing; in Lockport, New York (executed, 2001)
  - Princess Aisha bint Hussein, Jordanian princess and sister of King Abdullah II; in Amman
  - Princess Zein bint Hussein, Jordanian princess and sister of King Abdullah II; in Amman
- Died:
  - John Laurence Pritchard, 83, British mathematician and writer specialising in works on aviation
  - Syarif Kasim II, 74, the 12th and last sultan of the Sultanate of Siak Sri Indrapura
  - William C. "King" Cole, 86, American college football player and coach

== April 24, 1968 (Wednesday) ==
- Police in Mexico arrested an American hitchhiker on suspicion that he was the assassin of Dr. Martin Luther King Jr. Daniel D. Kennedy, of Baltimore, was handcuffed while dining in a cafe in the town of Caborca in the state of Sonora, then brought to Hermosillo for 12 hours of questioning. He was released the next day. A police spokesman told the press afterward that Kennedy "didn't match the photographs" of James Earl Ray "at all". On the same day, a Canadian passport was issued to Ray in the name of Ramon George Sneyd, a Toronto policeman whose identity Ray had stolen.
- By a margin of just 8 votes, the government of France's Prime Minister Georges Pompidou survived a motion of censure on plans to introduce commercial advertising on France's ORTF state-operated television network. At the time, there were 486 members of the Assemblée Nationale, and the motion required at least 244 members to vote in its favor, which would require every one of the 244 opposition members to approve. A coalition of Socialists, Communists and Centrists was able to get 236 votes.
- The International Olympic Committee announced that South Africa would be excluded from participating in the 1968 Summer Olympics. After the ballots were counted from the 71 IOC Board members, the result was 47 in favor of banning South Africa, 16 against, and 8 abstaining.
- Columbia University students, protesting against the Vietnam War, took over administration buildings and effectively shut down the Ivy League institution in New York City. The siege would last for six days until broken up by the New York Police Department on April 30.
- Born:
  - Yuji Nagata, Japanese professional wrestler; in Togane, Chiba Prefecture
  - Stacy Haiduk, American television actress; in Grand Rapids, Michigan
  - Joseph di Pasquale, Italian architect; in Como
- Died:
  - Walter Tewksbury, 92, American track and field athlete who won five medals at the 1900 Summer Olympics
  - Tommy Noonan, 46, American film actor, died from a brain tumor

== April 25, 1968 (Thursday) ==
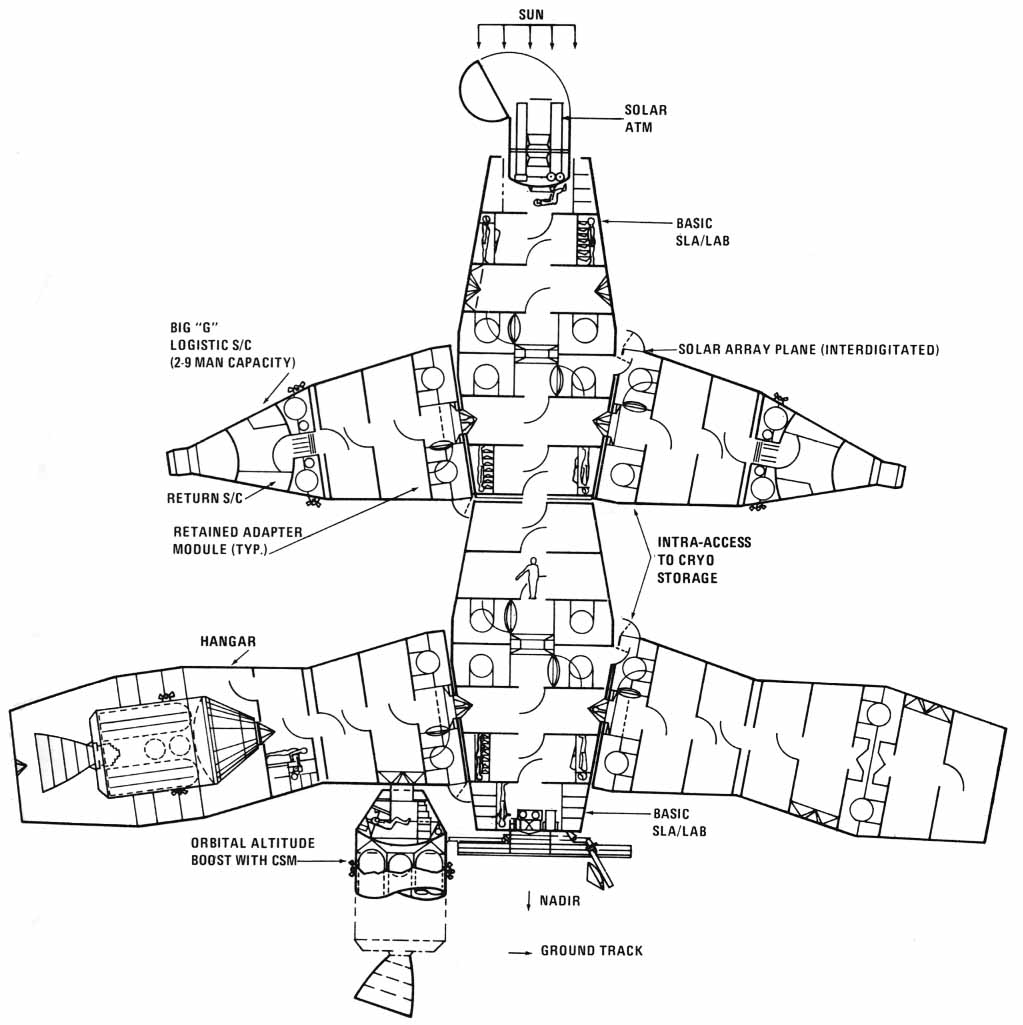
One concept for the space laboratory

- NASA published a report containing 18 conceptual designs for the Earth-orbital spacecraft lunar module adapter laboratory prepared by spacecraft design experts of the MSC Advanced Spacecraft Technology Division. One such configuration (pictured) was developed to illustrate the extent to which the building block philosophy could be carried. It would utilize both Gemini and Apollo spacecraft and would require 2 uncrewed launches and 10 crewed logistic launches.
- The Politburo of the Romanian Communist Party removed Alexandru Drăghici, the former Minister of Internal Affairs for Romania and the chief rival to Nicolae Ceaușescu within the Party, from all of his posts. As Minister of Romania's feared secret police, the Securitate, Drăghici had orchestrated the execution of Lucrețiu Pătrășcanu in 1954.
- Algeria's President Houari Boumedienne survived an assassination attempt. He was being driven away from a cabinet meeting when two assailants fired machine guns at his car, killing one of his bodyguards and causing the President to be struck by flying glass. Police killed the assassins after they fled to the hills overlooking Algiers.
- The 23rd Vuelta a España (Tour of Spain) bicycle race began. It would be won by Felice Gimondi on May 12 after he was the leader at the completion of the 18 stages of the 3,014-kilometre (1,873-mile) race.
- Born: Massimo Di Cataldo, Italian singer; in Rome
- Died:
  - Anna Maria Mussolini, 38, daughter of Benito Mussolini. She had been disabled by polio since childhood. In order not to be identified with the Fascist era, she had attempted to start a career as a radio host under a nickname.
  - Donald Davidson, 74, American poet, author, and proponent of racial segregation

== April 26, 1968 (Friday) ==
- An estimated 200,000 college and high school students in New York City failed to show up for school after a call for a nationwide protest by the Student Mobilization Committee To End the War In Vietnam, but, as contemporary accounts noted "outside of New York City, it appeared that only small numbers of students were taking part in the activities" and "most schools across the country reported normal or near-normal activities". More than 20 years later, a historian would claim that "the largest student protest in the nation's history occurred as more than one million high school and college students boycotted classes to show their disdain for the war."
- The second-largest hydrogen bomb ever tested in the continental United States was detonated underground at the Nevada Test Site. With a yield of 1.3 Megaton, the blast was so powerful that it registered at 6.5 on the Richter Scale and shook buildings 100 miles away in Las Vegas. The crater formed by the weapon, code-named "Boxcar", was 300 feet wide and 50 feet deep.
- Siaka Stevens was sworn in as the Prime Minister of Sierra Leone, taking the office to which he had been elected in 1967 before a military coup, and restoring Sierra Leone to civilian rule. In 1971, Stevens would become the nation's first President when his nation became a republic.
- Born: Corrinne Wicks, English TV soap opera actress; in Cheltenham
- Died: John Heartfield (Helmut Herzfeld), 76, German artist and anti-fascist activist

== April 27, 1968 (Saturday) ==
- Surgeons at the Hôpital de la Pitié in Paris, began the first heart transplant operation to be performed in Europe, and the seventh in the world. A three-man surgical team, led by Dr. Christian Cabrol, began the surgery after 23-year-old Michel Gyppaz died of brain injuries received in an automobile accident, and completed it nine hours later. The recipient, Clovis Roblain, suffered damage during the operation after a decrease in the supply of blood and oxygen to his brain. He never regained consciousness and died 51 hours after receiving the new heart.
- The Abortion Act 1967 came into effect in the UK, legalizing abortion on a number of grounds, with the abortions paid by the National Health Service. The law required an agreement by "two registered medical practitioners" that the risk to the life or to the physical or mental health of the pregnant woman would be "greater than if the pregnancy was not terminated" or if there was a substantial risk that the unborn child would be seriously handicapped.
- The vacant world heavyweight boxing championship was filled by Jimmy Ellis, one year to the day after the World Boxing Association had stripped the title from Muhammad Ali on April 28, 1967. Ellis— who, like Ali, was a native of Louisville, Kentucky— was considered the underdog in the fight in Oakland against Jerry Quarry, won in a split decision after 15 rounds against Quarry, with two judges in his favor and the third calling the bout a draw.
- U.S. Vice President Hubert Humphrey formally announced that he would seek the Democratic Party nomination to run for President of the United States. Humphrey committed to the run during a speech to supporters at the Shoreham Hotel in Washington, and American television networks interrupted their regular programming to show the speech live.
- National Airlines stopped operating its last Lockheed L-188A Electra propjets and became an "all-jet airline". Its fleet operated Douglas DC-8 and Boeing 727 aircraft. The final flight originated in Boston and made five stops before touching down in Fort Myers, Florida.
- Born: Ramzi Yousef, convicted Pakistani terrorist who was one of the main perpetrators of the 1993 World Trade Center bombing and the bombing of Philippine Airlines Flight 434

== April 28, 1968 (Sunday) ==
- Five athletes on the track and field team of Lamar University in Texas were killed, along with their coach and a pilot, when their twin-engine Beechcraft airplane crashed near Beaumont and exploded. The group was returning home after competing the day before at the Drake Relays outdoor event in Des Moines, Iowa.
- Born: Howard Donald, British singer of the English pop-group Take That; in Droylsden, Lancashire

== April 29, 1968 (Monday) ==
- Italian Prime Minister Aldo Moro laid the cornerstone of the government-owned Alfa Romeo auto factory in Pomigliano d’Arco. While the factory was intended to bring jobs and more industry to Southern Italy, it would prove to be an economic failure.
- The musical Hair, with music by Galt MacDermot and lyrics by Gerome Ragni, opened on Broadway, at the Biltmore Theatre, and would run for 1,873 performances.
- The Royal Netherlands Navy decommissioned its last aircraft carrier, HNLMS Karel Doorman (R81).
- Born:
  - Carnie Wilson, American singer and television personality; in Los Angeles, as the daughter to Beach Boys singer Brian Wilson
  - Jürgen Vogel, German character actor; in Hamburg

== April 30, 1968 (Tuesday) ==
- The deployment of the 27th U.S. Marine Regimental Landing Team brought the number of Marines stationed in Vietnam to four less than 86,000. The 85,996 U.S. Marines represent the peak of that service branch's presence in the Vietnam War.
- Officers of the NYPD retook control of five occupied buildings on the campus of Columbia University, arrested 720 demonstrators, and ended the strike that had closed the institution.
- New York Governor Nelson Rockefeller announced that he would challenge frontrunner Richard M. Nixon for the Republican Party nomination for President of the United States.
- Jim Cairns unsuccessfully challenged Gough Whitlam for leadership of the Australian Labor Party. The ALP caucus gave Whitlam 38 votes and Cairns 32.
- Died: Clovis Roblain, 65, died less than six hours after receiving the first heart transplant performed in Europe
