= Prichard =

Prichard may refer to:

== People ==
- Alan Prichard (1907–1986), New Zealand aviator
- Brandon Prichard (born 2001), American politician
- Bruce Prichard (born 1963), American professional wrestling personality
- Caradog Prichard (1904–1980), Welsh poet and novelist
- Gwilym Prichard (1931–2015), Welsh landscape painter
- H. A. Prichard (1871–1947), English moral philosopher
- Harold Prichard (1914/15–2003), American politician from Nebraska
- Hesketh Vernon Prichard (1876–1922), later Hesketh Hesketh-Prichard, British explorer, adventurer, sniper, and cricketer
- James Cowles Prichard (1786–1848), English physician and ethnologist
- Jane Prichard (1936–2023), New Zealand women's leader
- John Prichard (1817–1886), Welsh architect
- Katharine Susannah Prichard (1883–1969), Australian writer and founding Communist Party member
- Mathew Prichard (born 1943), British philanthropist
- Paul Prichard (born 1965), English former cricketer
- Robert Prichard (born 1949), Canadian lawyer, economist, and academic
- Rowland Prichard (1811–1887), Welsh musician
- Thomas Octavius Prichard (1808–1847), English psychiatrist and early advocate of humane treatment of the mentally ill
- Tom Prichard, American professional wrestler
- Vernon Prichard (1892–1949), U.S. Army major general and college football quarterback
- William Prichard (disambiguation), two people

== Places ==
- Prichard, Alabama, city
- Prichard, Idaho, an unincorporated community
- Prichard, Mississippi, unincorporated community
- Prichard, West Virginia, unincorporated census-designated place
- Prichard Creek, a stream in Idaho

== Other uses ==
- Prichard House (disambiguation), two houses on the US National Register of Historic Places

== See also ==
- Pritchard (disambiguation)
