= John Pritchard =

John or Jack Pritchard may refer to:

- John Pritchard (basketball) (1927–2012), American professional basketball player
- John Pritchard (bishop) (born 1948), Anglican bishop of Oxford
- John Pritchard (Canadian politician) (1861–1941), Progressive party member of the Canadian House of Commons
- John Pritchard (conductor) (1918–1989), British conductor
- John Pritchard (footballer) (born 1995), English footballer
- John Pritchard (MP) (1797–1891), British Member of Parliament for Bridgnorth
- John Pritchard (rower) (born 1957), British rower who competed in the 1980 and 1984 Summer Olympics
- John A. Pritchard (1914–1942), U.S. Coast Guardsman who died during a rescue attempt in Greenland
- J. E. M. Pritchard (John Edward Maddock Pritchard, 1889–1921), British airship captain
- John Langford Pritchard (1799–1850), English actor
- John Laurence Pritchard (1885–1968), British mathematician and writer
- John T. Pritchard (1883–1965), Wisconsin State Assemblyman
- Jack Pritchard (furniture designer) (1899–1992), British furniture designer
- Jack Pritchard (cricketer) (1895–1936), English cricketer and British Army officer
- Jack Pritchard (field hockey) (born 1993), Welsh field hockey player
- Jack Pritchard (footballer) (1918–2000), English footballer

== See also ==
- John Prichard (1817–1886), Welsh architect
