= James Pritchard =

James Pritchard may refer to:

- James Pritchard (boxer) (born 1961), heavyweight boxer
- James Pritchard (businessman) (1836–1926), Florida pioneer, real estate businessman and banker
- James Pritchard (politician) (1763–1813), politician who served in the legislatures of the Northwest Territory, and in Ohio
- James Pritchard (rugby union) (born 1979), Australian-Canadian rugby union player and former rugby league footballer
- James B. Pritchard (1909–1997), American archeologist
- Jim Pritchard (1948–2014), Canadian ice hockey player

== See also ==
- James Cowles Prichard (1786–1848), English physician and ethnologist
