= Edward Pritchard =

Edward Pritchard may refer to:

- Colonel Edward Pritchard (died 1655), former owner of Llancaiach Fawr Manor.
- Edward William Pritchard (1825–1865), Scottish doctor and murderer
- Edward Pritchard (engineer) (1930–2007), Australian steam car designer
- Edward Pritchard and Co. from Joseph W. Taylor
- Edward Pritchett, translator of the Telugu Bible, see Bible Society of India Andhra Pradesh Auxiliary
- Eddie Pritchard, boxer, opponent of Alan Richardson
- Ted Pritchard, boxer, opponent of Jim Hall

== See also ==
- Edward Pritchard Gee (1904–1968), Anglo-Indian tea-planter and naturalist
- Edward Evans-Pritchard (1902–1973), British anthropologist
