= William Prichard =

William Prichard may refer to:

- William Prichard (priest) (c. 1563–1629), Welsh Anglican and Oxford academic
- Sir William Prichard (politician) (c. 1632–1705), MP for City of London, 1685–1687, 1690–1695 and 1702–1705
