= Kosmos 213 =

Spacecraft

- Mission type: Uncrewed spacecraft
- Operator: OKB-1
- COSPAR ID: 1968-030A
- SATCAT no.: 03193
- Mission duration: 5 days

Spacecraft properties
- Spacecraft: Soyuz
- Spacecraft type: Soyuz 7K-OK # 7
- Manufacturer: OKB-1
- Launch mass: 6000 kg

Start of mission
- Launch date: 15 April 1968, 09:34:18 GMT
- Rocket: Soyuz 11A511 s/n U15000-06
- Launch site: Baikonur, Site 1/5
- Contractor: OKB-1

End of mission
- Landing date: 20 April 1968

Orbital parameters
- Reference system: Geocentric
- Regime: Low Earth
- Perigee altitude: 193 km
- Apogee altitude: 245 km
- Inclination: 51.4°
- Period: 89.16 minutes
- Epoch: 15 April 1968

Docking with Kosmos 212
- Docking date: 15 April 1968
- Undocking date: 15 April 1968

Kosmos 213 (Russian: Космос 213 meaning Cosmos 213) was one of a series of Soviet Soyuz programme test spacecraft whose purpose was to further test and develop the passenger version. Scientific data and measurements were relayed to earth by multichannel telemetry systems equipped with space-borne memory units. Kosmos 212 and Kosmos 213 automatically docked in orbit on April 15, 1968. Both spacecraft landed on Soviet territory.

== Mission ==
On 15 April 1968 at 09:34:18 GMT, the Soyuz 11A511 s/n U15000-06 booster and Kosmos 213 were set up at Site 1/5 of Baikonur Cosmodrome and the planned mission could be carried out. Kosmos 213 was operated in a low Earth orbit, it had a perigee of 193 kilometres (120 mi), an apogee of 245 kilometres (152 mi), an inclination of 51.4°, and an orbital period of 89.16 minutes, and had a mass of 6,000 kilograms (13,000 lb).
