= Pritchard =

Pritchard may refer to:

== Buildings ==
- Pritchard Gymnasium, a sports complex in Stony Brook, New York, U.S.
- Pritchard House, Titusville, Florida, U.S.
- Pritchard Hall, a residence hall on the Campus of Virginia Tech, Blacksburg, Virginia, U.S.

== Places ==
- Pritchard Peak, Antarctica
- Mount Pritchard, New South Wales, Australia
- Pritchard, British Columbia, Canada
- Pritchard Provincial Park, British Columbia, Canada
- Pritchard Park, Bainbridge Island, Washington, U.S.
- Bartel-Pritchard Square, Windsor Terrace, Brooklyn, New York

== Others ==
- Pritchard (surname)

== See also ==
- The Amazing Mrs Pritchard, British television programme
- Paul Pritchard Shipyard, Mount Pleasant, South Carolina, U.S.
- Pritchard Rocket Air Ship, American homebuilt wingless aircraft
- R v Pritchard (1836), a law case in England and Wales on assessing a defendant's fitness to plead
