= Catrin Pritchard =

British researcher

Catrin Pritchard is a British researcher who is professor of cancer biochemistry and deputy director of the Leicester Cancer Research Centre at the University of Leicester. She was director of the Leicester CRUK Centre from 2014–2017 and head of department of cancer studies at the University of Leicester from 2014–2018. Her research focuses on animal and human preclinical models for cancer.

== Education ==
Pritchard received her MA in biochemistry from Jesus College, Oxford University, in 1983. In 1987 she finished her PhD at the Imperial Cancer Research Fund on mapping of the male determining gene on the human Y chromosome under the supervision of Peter Goodfellow. Pritchard undertook postdoctoral research at the University of California, San Francisco (1987–1991) and at the DNAX Research Institute, California (1992–1995). At DNAX she worked on intracellular signalling through RAF kinases, investigating their mechanisms of control of the MAPK pathway in normal and cancer cells.

== Career and research ==
Pritchard moved to the University of Leicester where she held a Royal Society University Research Fellow from 1995–2003. She began to use genetic mouse models to investigate the role of the RAF family of protein kinases in control of intracellular signalling pathways involved in mammalian development. She developed conditional knockin mouse models for oncogenic forms of BRAF detected in human cancer and used these models to understand mechanisms of oncogene-driven cancer initiation and progression. The majority of this work was supported by Cancer Research UK programme funding. Part of this research involved receptors that were linked to male fertility.

In 2009, Pritchard was appointed chair of cancer biochemistry at the University of Leicester and, in 2010, she was awarded a Royal Society-Wolfson merit award, which she held until 2015. In 2017, she began development of a new patient-derived explant model system, which is being applied to the preclinical testing of anti-cancer drugs and in the development of pharmacodynamic biomarkers.

== Awards and honours ==
- Royal Society University Research Fellowship: 1995–2003
- Royal Society-Wolfson merit award holder: 2010–2015
