= Jack Pritchard (cricketer) =

English cricketer

Personal information
- Full name: Jack Mervyn Pritchard
- Born: 19 May 1895; Madras, Madras Presidency, British India
- Died: 17 November 1936 (aged 41); Kensington, London, England
- Batting: Unknown
- Bowling: Unknown

Domestic team information
- Years: Team
- 1919: Oxford University

Career statistics
Competition	First-class
Matches	2
Runs scored	36
Batting average	18.00
100s/50s	–/–
Top score	22*
Balls bowled	390
Wickets	7
Bowling average	25.28
5 wickets in innings	–
10 wickets in match	–
Best bowling	4/45
Catches/stumpings	2/–
- Source: ESPNcricinfo, 4 April 2020

Jack Mervyn Pritchard (19 May 1895 – 17 November 1936) was an English first-class cricketer and British Army officer.

The son of John Arthur Pritchard, he was born in British India at Madras in May 1895. He was educated in England at Charterhouse School. Instead of progressing straight to university from Chaterhouse, Pritchard instead served in the British Army during the First World War, being commissioned as a second lieutenant with the Queen's Own Royal West Kent Regiment in August 1914. He was made a temporary lieutenant in October 1914, with promotion to the full rank coming in April 1916. He was promoted to captain in May 1917.

Following the war, Pritchard went up to Brasenose College at the University of Oxford. While studying at Oxford, he played first-class cricket for Oxford University in 1919, playing against the Free Foresters and Sussex. He scored 36 runs in his two matches, with a high score of 22 not out, while with the ball he took 7 wickets with best figures of 4 for 45. Pritchard died at Kensington in November 1936.
