= Prichard House =

Prichard House may refer to:

- Prichard House (Carthage, Missouri), listed on the National Register of Historic Places in Jasper County, Missouri
- Prichard House (Huntington, West Virginia), listed on the National Register of Historic Places in Cabell County, West Virginia
