= Geoff Pritchard =

Australian rules footballer

Personal information
- Full name: Geoffrey Pritchard
- Born: 9 December 1966 (age 59)
- Original team: Montmorency
- Height: 201 cm (6 ft 7 in)
- Weight: 96 kg (212 lb)

Playing career^{1}
Years	Club	Games (Goals)
1986	Collingwood	1 (0)
- ^{1} Playing statistics correct to the end of 1986.

Geoffrey "Geoff" Pritchard (born 9 December 1966) is a former Australian rules footballer who played with Collingwood in the Victorian Football League (VFL).

Pritchard, a ruckman recruited from Montmorency, played just one senior game for Collingwood. It came in Collingwood's round 18 game against Melbourne at Victoria Park, in the 1986 VFL season.

In 1989, Pritchard joined Port Melbourne.
