= Kosmos 212 =

Soviet Soyuz programme test spacecraft

- Mission type: Uncrewed spacecraft
- Operator: OKB-1
- COSPAR ID: 1968-029A
- SATCAT no.: 03183
- Mission duration: 5 days

Spacecraft properties
- Spacecraft: Soyuz
- Spacecraft type: Soyuz 7K-OK # 8
- Manufacturer: OKB-1
- Launch mass: 6000 kg

Start of mission
- Launch date: 14 April 1968, 10:00:00 GMT
- Rocket: Soyuz 11A511 s/n Ya15000-09
- Launch site: Baikonur, Site 31/6
- Contractor: OKB-1

End of mission
- Landing date: 19 April 1968

Orbital parameters
- Reference system: Geocentric
- Regime: Low Earth
- Perigee altitude: 186 km
- Apogee altitude: 225 km
- Inclination: 51.7°
- Period: 88.75 minutes
- Epoch: 14 April 1968

Docking with Kosmos 213
- Docking date: 15 April 1968
- Undocking date: 15 April 1968

Kosmos 212 (Russian: Космос 212 meaning Cosmos 212) was one of a series of Soviet Soyuz programme test spacecraft whose purpose was to further test and develop the passenger version. Scientific data and measurements were relayed to earth by multichannel telemetry systems equipped with space-borne memory units. Kosmos 212 and Kosmos 213 automatically docked in orbit on 15 April 1968. Both spacecraft landed on Soviet territory.

== Mission ==
On 14 April 1968 at 10:00:00 GMT, the Soyuz 11A511 s/n Ya15000-09 booster and Kosmos 212 were set up at Site 31/6 of Baikonur Cosmodrome and the planned mission could be carried out. Kosmos 212 was operated in a low Earth orbit, it had a perigee of 186 kilometres (116 mi), an apogee of 225 kilometres (140 mi), an inclination of 51.7°, and an orbital period of 88.75 minutes, and had a mass of 6,000 kilograms (13,000 lb).

- Number of orbits: ~80
