= Esther Pritchard =

American minister and editor (1840–1900)

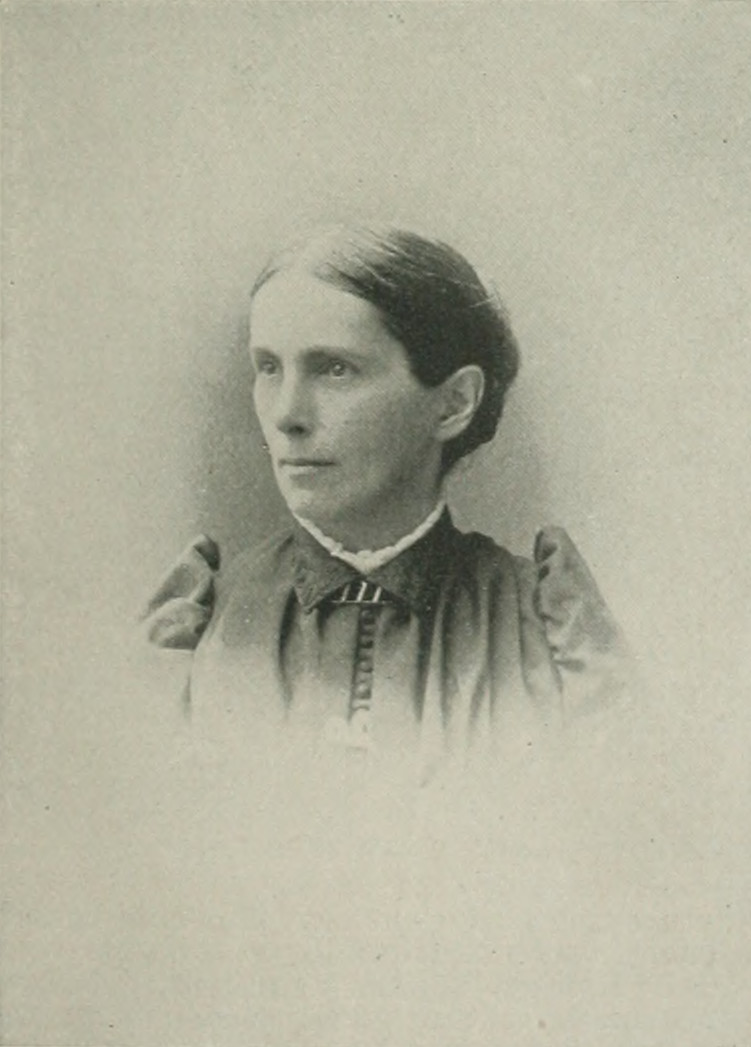
- Photo in A Woman of the Century
- Born: Esther B. Wood; January 26, 1840; Morrow County, Ohio, U.S.
- Died: August 6, 1900 (aged 60); Kokomo, Indiana, U.S.
- Resting place: Sugar Grove Cemetery, Wilmington, Ohio, U.S.
- Education: Delaware College
- Occupations: Minister; editor
- Spouses: Lucius Vincent Tuttle (m. 1866; died 1881); Calvin W. Pritchard (m. 1885; died 1896)
- Children: 1
- Writing career
- Language: English
- Notable works: A Responsive Reading on Proportionate and Systemic Giving. With catalogue of books on this subject.

Esther Pritchard (née, Wood; after first marriage, Tuttle; after second marriage, Pritchard; January 26, 1840 – August 6, 1900) was a 19th-century American minister and editor. Pritchard was the daughter of a minister of the Society of Friends. She was one of the leading preachers of the Friends' Society in the United States, and was the Woman's Christian Temperance Union's Superintendent of the Department of Systematic Giving. Pritchard edited for some years the Friend's Missionary Advocate, and was a teacher in the Chicago Training School for Missions. Her husband's removal from Chicago to the pastorate of the Friends church, Kokomo, Indiana, severed her connection with the school and left her free to push the special work of her department. Seventeen State Unions subsequently adopted the department, while outside the Woman's Christian Temperance Union, ten Woman's Missionary Boards were influenced to create a similar agency.

== Early life and education ==
Esther B. Wood was born in Morrow County, Ohio, January 26, 1840. She came from Quaker ancestry, and her ministerial ability was inherited from both parents. Her parents were Daniel Wood and his wife, Elizabeth Lancaster (Benedict) Wood. Daniel was a preacher, and there were a number in her mother's family. A happy girl, strong-willed and ambitious, it was not until a time of sorrow that she yielded to her vocation.

She spent her childhood in Morrow County, and received her early education there.

== Career ==
In her young adulthood, while a student at Delaware College, she met Prof. Lucius Vincent Tuttle (1838-1881), a volunteer in the Civil War, who devoted the remainder of his life to the profession of teaching. They married August 11, 1866, at Morrow, Ohio. The couple had one daughter, Mary Elizabeth Tuttle (1867-1869), who died at the age of 22 months. The death of the child had a profound effect on the mother who became a duly recorded a Minister of the Gospel, and spent considerable time in evangelistic work, mainly in Ohio and on the Atlantic Coast. Prof. Tuttle died in 1881.

In 1884, Pritchard was chosen by the Woman's Foreign Missionary Union of Friends in America to edit the Friend's Missionary Advocate, the organization's official organ, and took up her headquarters in Chicago, Illinois. Shortly after her removal to that city, on February 19, 1885, she married Calvin W. Pritchard (1834–1896), editor of the Christian Worker. She assisted her husband in his duties as editor of the Christian Worker, and in his pastoral work in Kokomo, Indiana, where she spent the last 13 years of her life. For six years, Pritchard served as the editor and manager of the Friends Missionary Advocate. It was largely through her influence that the Friends Mission was established in Nanjing, China. In 1886, she became the proprietor of the Friend's Missionary Advocate, which she edited and published until the autumn of 1890, when it passed by gift from her to the Woman's Foreign Missionary Union of Friends.

Her work, A Responsive Reading on Proportionate and Systemic Giving. With catalogue of books on this subject. was published by the Woman's Foreign Missionary Union of Friends in America, in Cheltenham, Pennsylvania. She was a contemporary of Frances Willard, and Esther Pugh.

For several years, Pritchard was a national officer of the Woman's Christian Temperance Union.

During the period of 1891–93, she was actively engaged as Bible teacher in the Chicago training school for city, home and foreign missions, besides acting as superintendent of the systematic-giving department of the National Woman's Christian Temperance Union. She was a good Bible scholar, and an effective Bible teacher. Her serious concern was that the Church might be preserved from the influences of destructive "Biblical criticism". Frail health imposed limitations upon taking on additional work.

== Personal life ==
She made her home in Western Springs, Illinois.

Her last sickness, being of short duration, and she unconscious a part of the time, it seemed Pritchard did not realize her approaching death. She died on the morning of August 6, 1900, at Kokomo, Indiana, and was buried at Sugar Grove Cemetery, Wilmington, Ohio.
