= Lauren Pritchard =

Lauren Pritchard may refer to:

- Lauren Pritchard (actress) (born 1977), American actress
- Lauren Pritchard (singer) (born 1987), American singer
