= Jim Pritchard =

Canadian ice hockey player (1948–2014)

- Born: February 14, 1948 Winnipeg, Manitoba, Canada
- Died: April 1, 2014 (aged 66) Vancouver, British Columbia, Canada
- Height: 5 ft 9 in (175 cm)
- Weight: 175 lb (79 kg; 12 st 7 lb)
- Position: Defence
- Shot: Left
- Played for: WHA; Chicago Cougars
- NHL draft: 3rd overall, 1968; Montreal Canadiens
- Playing career: 1968–1977

James George Pritchard (February 14, 1948 - April 1, 2014) was a Canadian professional ice hockey defenceman. He was selected by the Montreal Canadiens in the first round (3rd overall) of the 1968 NHL Amateur Draft.

Pritchard played two games with the Chicago Cougars of the World Hockey Association during the 1974–75 season.

== Career statistics ==
=== Regular season and playoffs ===
			Regular season					Playoffs
Season	Team	League	GP	G	A	Pts	PIM	GP	G	A	Pts	PIM
1967–68	Winnipeg Jets	WCJHL	53	30	34	64	158	—	—	—	—	—
1968–69	Houston Apollos	CHL	46	2	6	8	33	3	0	0	0	11
1969–70	Kansas City Blues	CHL	66	9	26	35	85	—	—	—	—	—
1969–70	Salt Lake Golden Eagles	WHL	2	0	0	0	0	—	—	—	—	—
1970–71	Jacksonville–Clinton	EHL	39	4	12	16	28	5	0	0	0	6
1970–71	Amarillo Wranglers	CHL	7	0	2	2	22	—	—	—	—	—
1971–72	Clinton Comets	EHL	75	9	19	28	80	5	2	2	4	4
1972–73	Clinton–Long Island	EHL	65	9	33	42	65	4	0	2	2	8
1973–74	Long Island Cougars	NAHL	74	11	45	56	123	16	3	7	10	6
1974–75	Long Island Cougars	NAHL	69	16	39	55	92	11	0	11	11	7
1974–75	Chicago Cougars	WHA	2	0	0	0	0	—	—	—	—	—
1975–76	Erie Blades	NAHL	71	16	54	70	64	5	0	1	1	0
1976–77	Erie Blades	NAHL	35	3	11	14	10	—	—	—	—	—
1976–77	Johnstown Jets	NAHL	33	1	15	16	24	3	0	0	0	0
WHA totals			2	0	0	0	0	—	—	—	—	—

== Awards ==
- WCJHL Second All-Star Team – 1968
