= John Laurence Pritchard =

British writer

- Born: 25 February 1885; London, England
- Died: 23 April 1968 (aged 83); Dorking, England
- Occupations: Mathematician, writer
- Writing career
- Pen name: John Laurence
- Period: 20th century
- Genres: Fiction, aviation, criminology

John Laurence Pritchard (25 February 1885 – 23 April 1968) was a British mathematician and writer specialising in works on aviation. He also wrote detective novels and works about criminology using the pseudonym John Laurence.

== Biography ==
A mathematician by training and a specialist in aeronautics, he served in the army with the rank of captain. He was a member of the Royal Aeronautical Society and was its secretary from 1925 to 1951. He was also the editor of the newspaper of this society from 1920 to 1945.

Using the pseudonym 'John Laurence', between 1924 and 1938 he published fifteen detective novels. He mixed his mystery settings with elements of adventure stories, espionage and sometimes science fiction. In The Fanshawe Court Mystery (1925), for example, the young writer John Martin comes to the rescue of a young girl whom he takes one evening on his motorcycle and finds himself in the midst of adventures where they encounter fraud, conspiracy, revenge and murder. The Double Cross Inn (1930) is an English spy thriller in the Edgar Wallace vein. As for Murder in the Stratosphere (1938), its intrigue centers on an aeronautical device using a technology which did not yet exist in the 1930s.

Pritchard also published aeronautical and other technical works using his real name.

== Works ==
- Aeroplane Structures, (1919/1935) with Alfred Pippard
- Wireless Construction, (1925)
- Broadcast Reception In Theory And Practice, (1926)
- The Book Of The Aeroplane, (1926/1929/1935)

=== Written as John Laurence ===
- Love Stories Of Famous Criminals, (1920)
- Everyday Swindles And How To Avoid Them, (1921)
- The Linkram Jewels, (1924)
- The Fanshawe Court Mystery, (1925)
- The Perfect Alibi, (1926)
- The Secret Of Sheen, (1927)
- The Pursuing Shadow, (1927)
- The Honeymoon Mystery, (1929)
- The Double Cross Inn, (1929)
- The Mysteries Of Ryeburn Manor, (1930)
- Mystery Money, (1930)
- Extraordinary Crimes, (1931)
- Seaside Crimes, (1931)
- A History Of Capital Punishment...Britain, (1932)
- Mystery From The Air, (1934)
- The Great Aeroplane Mystery, (1935)
- The Riddle Of Wraye, (1936)
- The Whiteoakes Murder, (1937)
- The Gold Treasure Mystery, (1938)
- Murder In The Stratosphere, (1938)
- Sir George Cayley: The Inventor Of The Aeroplane, (1961)
