= Edward William Pritchard =

English doctor and poisoner

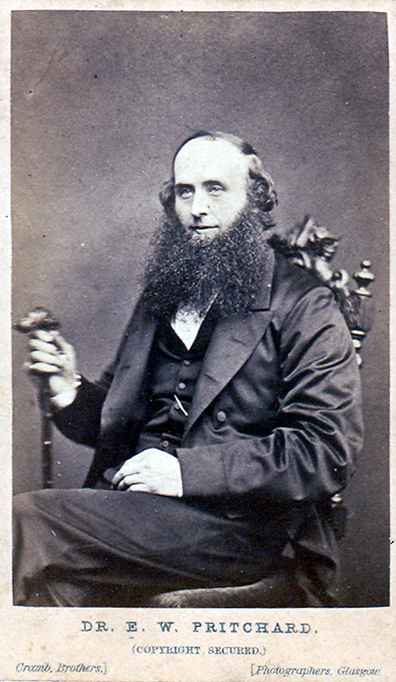
A contemporary photograph of the convict.

Edward William Pritchard (6 December 1825 – 28 July 1865) was an English medical doctor who was convicted of murdering his wife and mother-in-law by poisoning them. He was also suspected of murdering a servant girl, but was never tried for this crime.

He was the last person to be publicly executed in Glasgow.

== Early years ==
Pritchard was born in Southsea, Hampshire, into a naval family. His father was John White Pritchard, a captain.

He claimed to have studied at King's College Hospital in London and to have graduated from there in 1846. He then served in the Royal Navy as an assistant surgeon on HMS Victory. For another four years, he served on various other ships sailing around the world.

He returned to Portsmouth, England, on HMS Hecate. While in Portsmouth, he met his future wife, Mary Jane Taylor, the daughter of Michael Taylor (1793–1867), a prosperous retired silk merchant from Edinburgh then living at 22 Minto Street. The couple married in 1851. He had five children with her.

He resigned from the Navy and first took a job as a general practitioner in Yorkshire, living for a time in Hunmanby.

He was the author of several books on his travels and on the water cure at Hunmanby, as well as articles in The Lancet.

In 1859, he left under a cloud and in debt, and moved to Glasgow.

== Murders ==
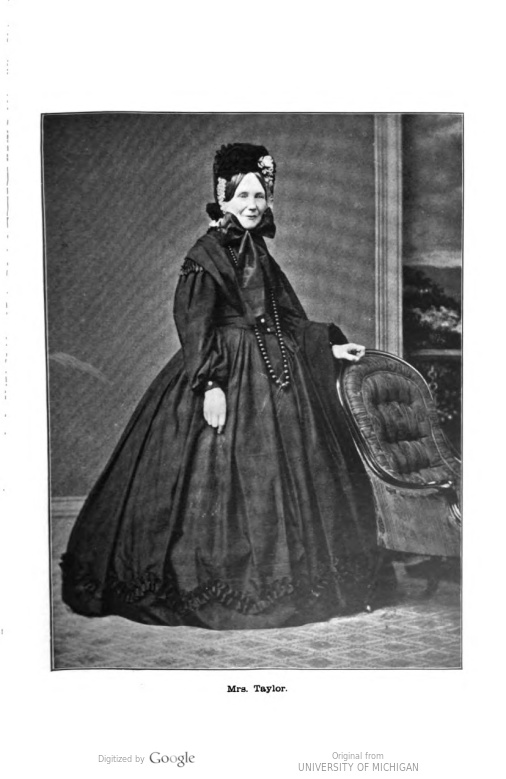
Mrs Taylor

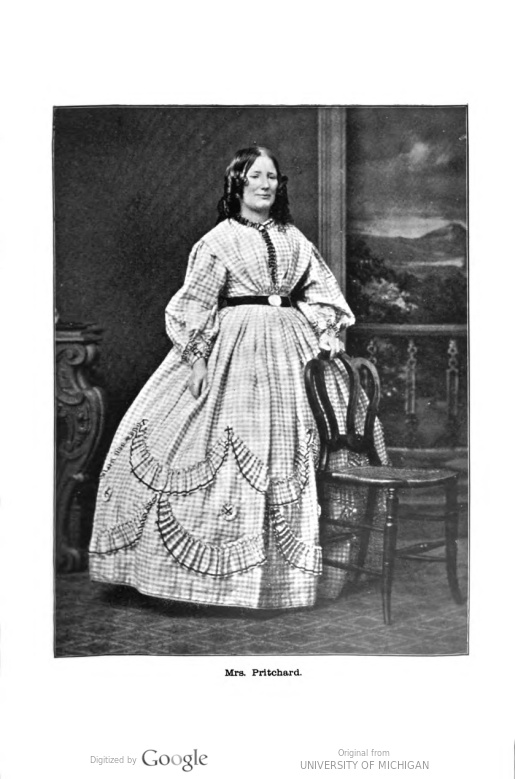
Mrs Mary Pritchard

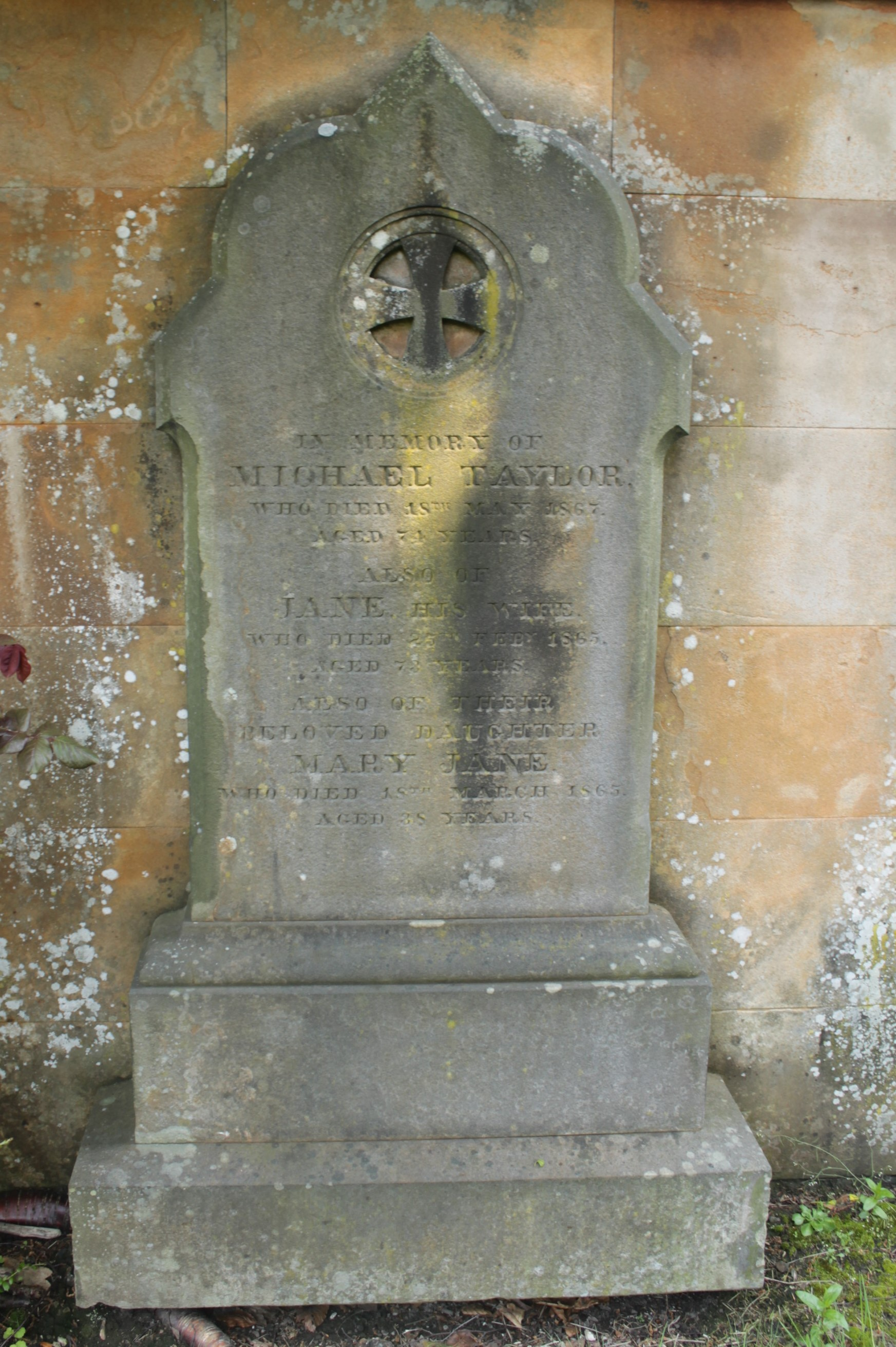
The Taylor grave, Grange Cemetery

On 5 May 1863, there was a fire in the Pritchards' house at 11 Berkeley Terrace, Glasgow, which killed a servant girl. Her name was Elizabeth McGrain, aged 25. The fire started in her room but she made no attempt to escape, suggesting that she was unconscious, drugged, or already dead.

The procurator fiscal looked into the case, but no charges were brought.

In 1865, Pritchard poisoned his mother-in-law, Jane Taylor, 70, who died on 28 February. His wife, whom he was treating for an illness (with the help of a Dr. Paterson), died a month later on 18 March at the age of 38. Both had been living at Pritchard's new family home at 131 Sauchiehall Street, Glasgow. She had gone to her family home at 1 Lauder Road in Edinburgh to recuperate, and this worked, but she became ill again on return to Glasgow. Both his wife and mother-in-law are buried in the grave purchased by his father-in-law, Michael Taylor, in Grange Cemetery in south Edinburgh. The grave lies on the eastmost wall around 40m from the entrance.

Dr. Paterson was highly suspicious of the "illnesses" of both women and, when the time came, refused to sign the death certificates. However, he did not go out of his way to inform the medical or legal authorities of his suspicions. A 'Vindication' of Dr Paterson was circulated at the time and he took other steps to clear his name.

Pritchard was apprehended after an anonymous letter was sent to the authorities. When the bodies of his wife and mother-in-law were exhumed, it was found that they contained the poisons antimony and aconitine.

== Trial and execution ==
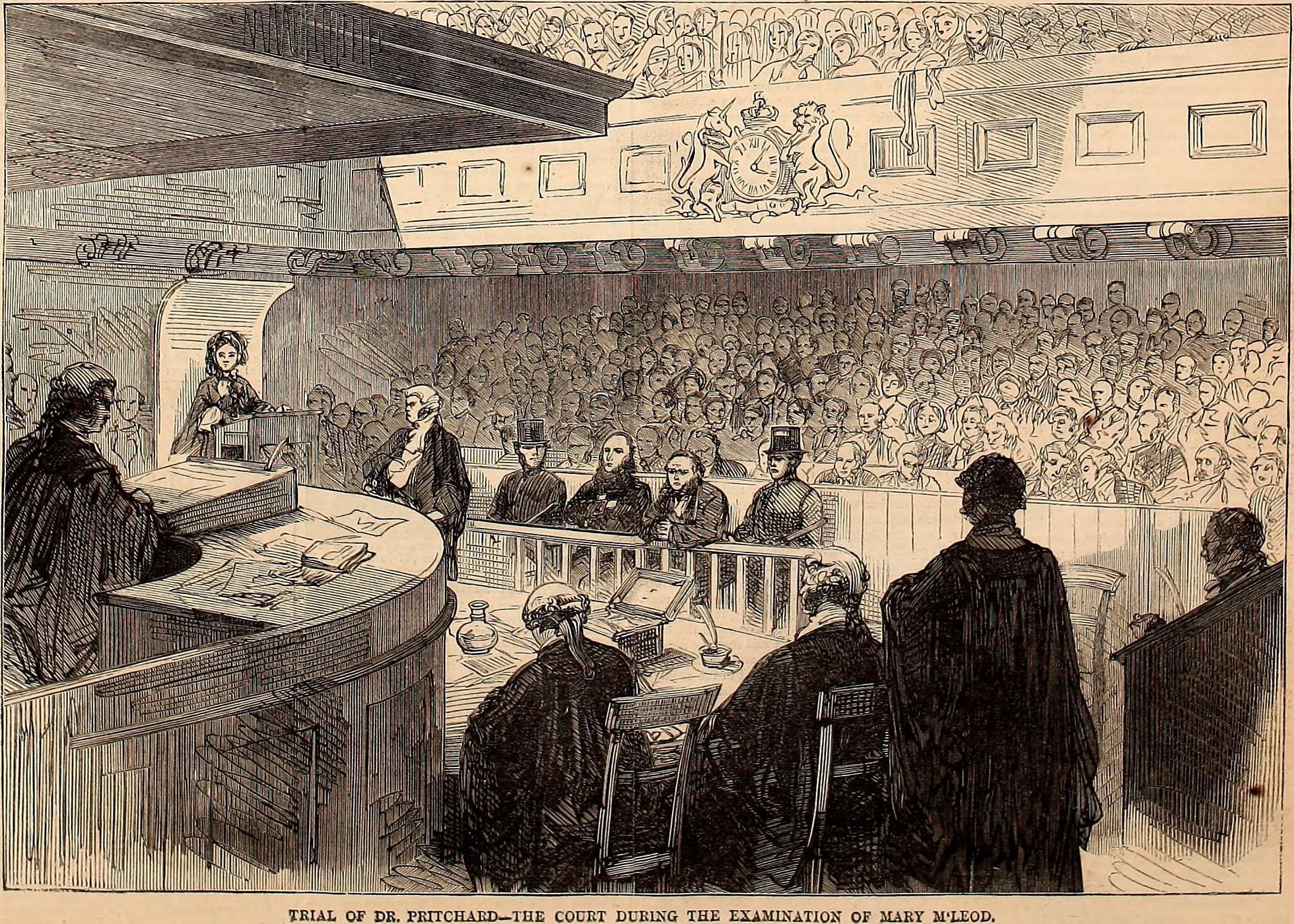
The court during the examination of Mary McLeod, Harper's Weekly

The major points of interest in the trial were:

- Pritchard's motive. Possibly he was having an affair with another maid in the household and would blame her for the poisonings as his defence.
- The strange reticence of Dr. Paterson to inform anyone in authority of his suspicions.

Pritchard was convicted of murder after a five-day hearing of the High Court in Edinburgh in July 1865, presided over by the Lord Justice Clerk, Lord Glencorse. He was hanged in front of thousands of spectators at the Saltmarket end of Glasgow Green at 8 a.m. on 28 July 1865, aged 39.

== In popular culture ==
In 1947, Scottish playwright James Bridie wrote Dr Angelus, based on the case. It originally starred Alastair Sim and George Cole. It was revived at the Finborough Theatre, London, in 2016.

Sir Cedric Hardwicke played Pritchard in the 6 October 1952 episode of the radio series Suspense.

In 1956, Pritchard was played by Joseph Cotten in an episode of the television series On Trial (episode name: "The Trial of Edward Pritchard").

In the Sherlock Holmes short story, The Adventure of the Speckled Band, while commenting on the apparent villain (Dr Grimesby Roylott), Holmes tells Dr Watson that when a doctor goes bad he is "the first of criminals". He then illustrates this with the comment that Drs Palmer and Pritchard were at the "head of their profession". Since neither was considered a good doctor, and Pritchard was considered something of a quack by the medical fraternity in Glasgow, their "profession" was that of murder.

In the audio drama Tales from the Aletheian Society Pritchard appears as the (deceased) former Chaptermaster of a shadowy occult organisation, driven to murder by dark supernatural forces.

At his trial Pritchard was represented (unsuccessfully) by Scottish law firm Maclay Murray and Spens. Upon his execution the law firm pursued his estate for their outstanding fees. But as there was no money in his estate to settle their bill they arrested his wooden consulting chair along with some other property. The chair remained on display in the firm's boardroom until as late as 2016.

== See also ==
- List of serial killers by country

== Bibliography ==
- "An eminent lawyer", A complete report of the trial of Dr. E. W. Pritchard for the alleged poisoning of his wife and mother-in-law, Issue 8 of Celebrated criminal cases, William Kay, 1865
- William Roughead, Trial of Dr. Pritchard, Notable Scottish Trials, William Hodge, 1906
- William Roughead, "Dr Pritchard" in Famous Trials 4 (ed. James H. Hodge), Penguin, 1954, 143-175
