= Jack Pritchard (footballer) =

English footballer

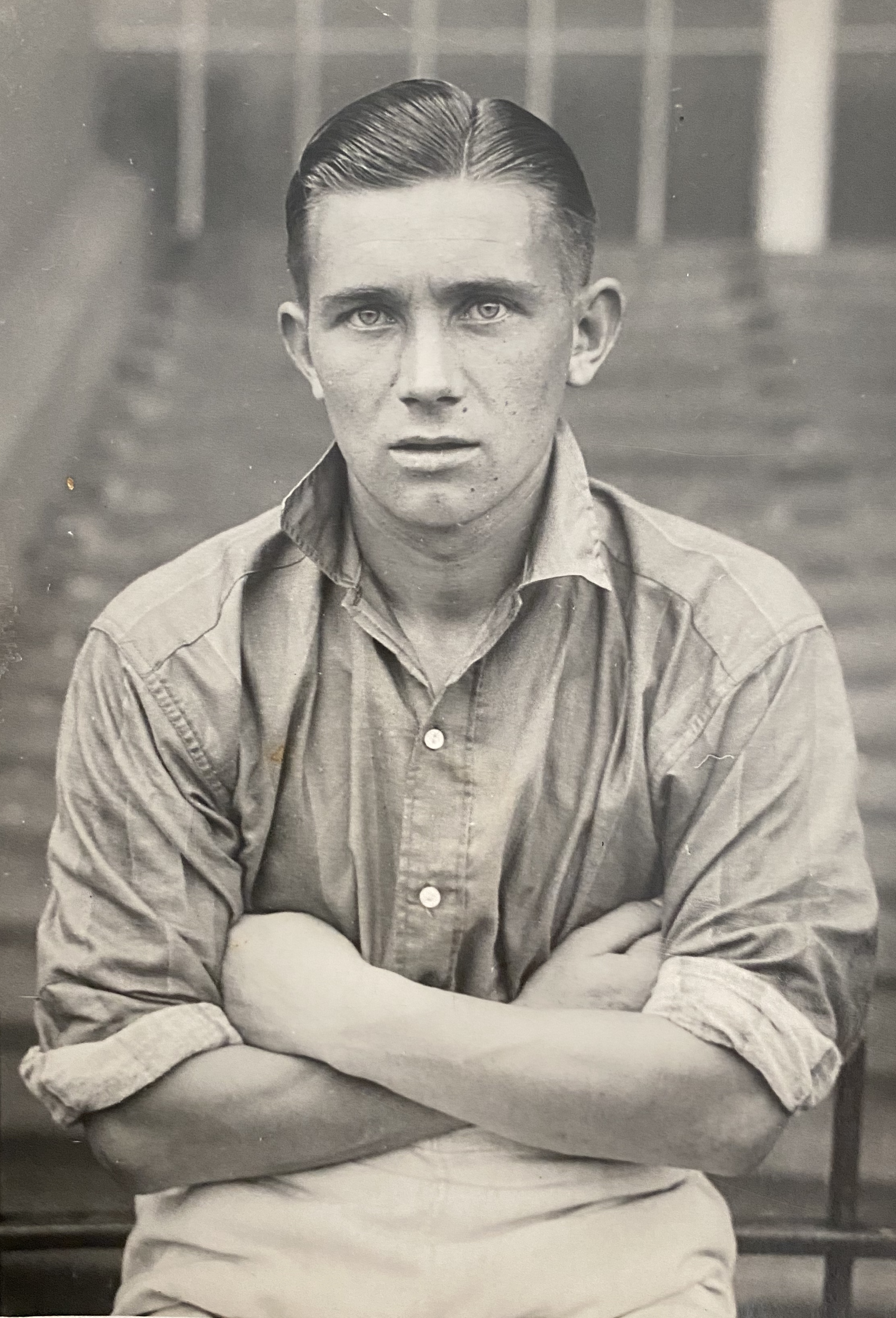
- Pritchard in 1938.

Personal information
- Full name: Harvey John Pritchard
- Date of birth: 30 January 1918
- Place of birth: Meriden, England
- Date of death: May 2000 (aged 87)
- Place of death: Beccles, England
- Height: 5 ft 8 in (1.73 m)
- Positions: Outside forward; left half

Senior career*
Years	Team	Apps	(Gls)
–1935	Exhall Colliery		
1935–1937	Coventry City	5	(2)
1937–1938	Crystal Palace	30	(6)
1938–1947	Manchester City	22	(6)
1947–1952	Southend United	71	(8)
- Folkestone Town

International career
- England Youth
- * Club domestic league appearances and goals

Harvey John Pritchard (30 January 1918 – May 2000) was an English professional footballer who played in the Football League for Southend United, Crystal Palace, Manchester City and Coventry City as an outside forward. He was capped by England at youth level and later served as trainer at Folkestone Town and Chelmsford City.

== Career statistics ==
Appearances and goals by club, season and competition
Club	Season	League			FA Cup		Total	
Club	Season	Division	Apps	Goals	Apps	Goals	Apps	Goals
Coventry City	1936–37	Second Division	5	2	0	0	5	2
Crystal Palace	1937–38	Third Division South	30	6	5	2	35	8
Manchester City	1937–38	First Division	9	3	―		9	3
Manchester City	1938–39	Second Division	13	3	0	0	13	3
Manchester City	1945–46	―			3	0	3	0
Manchester City	Total		22	6	3	0	25	6
Career total			57	14	8	2	65	16
