= Hannah Kilham =

Methodist and Quaker missionary

Hannah Kilham (1774–1832) née Spurr was an English Methodist and Quaker, known as a missionary and linguist active in West Africa. She was also a teacher and philanthropic activist in England and Ireland.

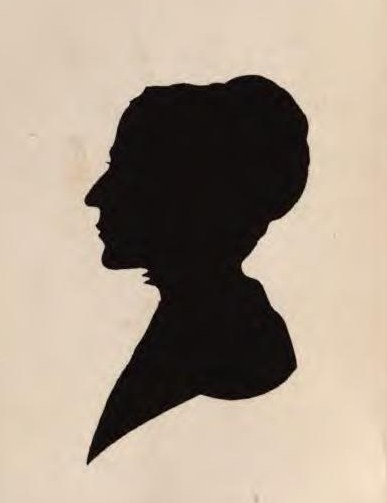
Hannah Kilham, silhouette portrait.

== Early life ==
She was born at Sheffield on 12 August 1774, the seventh child of Peter and Hannah Spurr, in trade there. Brought up in the Church of England, she was permitted to attend John Wesley's early morning services. Her mother's death when she was twelve (1786) had placed her at the head of the household, which consisted of her father and five brothers. Two years later her father died, and she was sent to a boarding-school at Chesterfield. At the age of 20 she joined the Wesleyans.

On 12 April 1798 Hannah Spurr became the second wife of Alexander Kilham, founder of the Methodist New Connexion, who died at Nottingham eight months later (20 December 1798). Hannah Kilham opened a day-school in Nottingham, spending her vacations at Epworth, her husband's early home. There she became acquainted with Quakers, and in 1802 joined the Society of Friends.

== Activist and missionary ==
In Sheffield, while still teaching, Kilham became involved in philanthropic work. She started a Society for the Bettering of the Condition of the Poor, which was imitated elsewhere.

In 1817 Kilham began work on unwritten languages of West Africa, with the aim of spreading Christianity. She produced an elementary grammar for the children in missionary schools at Sierra Leone. From two African sailors who were being educated at Tottenham, she acquired a knowledge of the Jaloof (Wolof) and Mandingo (Mandinka) languages, and in 1820 printed anonymously First Lessons in Jaloof. Kilham induced the Society of Friends to set up an unofficial African Instruction Fund Committee, in existence 1819 to 1825, with female representation. The committee, on which William Allen and Luke Howard sat, as a preliminary sent William Singleton to West Africa.

=== First African visit ===
In October 1823, under the auspices of the Friends' committee for promoting African instruction, she sailed with three Quaker missionaries and the two African sailors for St. Mary's, in the Gambia. Here she started a school, using her knowledge of Wolof. She taught also at Sierra Leone. Kilham had an Irish assistant in Sierra Leone, Ann Thompson of Cooladine, also a Quaker.

In July 1824 she returned to England to report to the committee of Friends.

In 1826 she was working in Spitalfields, on education, employment and health issues. She brought in Thomas Hodgkin to help with widespread disease, though there was little they could do.

Kilham then went to Ireland, and spent some months with the British and Irish Ladies' Society for famine relief. Noted documentation of Hannah Kilham and other individuals that made attempts to the spread of Christianity in the western sections of Africa can be further researched in the book, West African Christianity – the religious Impact, by author Lamin Sanneh, pg.66

=== Second African visit ===
On 11 November 1827 Kilham once more sailed for Sierra Leone, taking with her a number of African School Tracts (London, 1827), which she had published. She visited Freetown and the villages around; and in two or three months compiled word lists in 25 languages. For reasons of health she then returned home again.

=== Third African visit and death ===
On 17 October 1830 Kilham set out on her third and final voyage to Freetown. Having obtained permission from the governor to take charge of recaptive children rescued from slave-ships, Kilham, with the aid of a matron, founded a large school at Charlotte, a mountain village near Bathurst, and spent the rainy season there. She then travelled to Liberia, visited schools in Monrovia, and made arrangements for sending some African children to England for education. About 23 February 1832 she sailed for Sierra Leone. She died at sea, on 31 March 1832.

== Works ==
Besides works already mentioned, Kilham was the author of:

- Scripture Selections, London, 1817;
- A Short Vocabulary in the Language of the Senecan Nation, London, 1818;
- Lessons on Language, 1818;
- Family Maxims, 1818;
- First Lessons in Spelling, 1818;
- Ta-re wa-loof. Ta-re boo Juk-à. First Lessons in Jaloof, Tottenham, 1820;
- African Lessons: Wolof and English. In Three Parts, London, 1823;
- African Lessons: Mandingo and English, 1827;
- Report on a Recent Visit to Africa, 1827;
- African School Tracts, London, 1827;
- Specimens of African Languages, spoken in the Colony of Sierra Leone, London, 1828;
- The Claims of West Africa to Christian Instruction, 1830.

Hannah Kilham's memoirs and diaries were published (1837), edited by her step-daughter, Sarah Biller née Kilham. She ran a school in the tradition of Joseph Lancaster in St. Petersburg. An edition of some of Hannah Kilham's works was republished as Writings on Education in West Africa (2010).

== Attribution ==
This article incorporates text from a publication now in the public domain: "Kilham, Hannah". Dictionary of National Biography. London: Smith, Elder & Co. 1885–1900.
