= Kebbie Town =

Kebbie Town, Sierra Leone
- Location in Sierra Leone
- Coordinates: 8°20′N 13°04′W
- Country: Sierra Leone
- Region: Western Area
- District: Western Area Rural District
- Time zone: UTC-5 (GMT)

Kebbie Town is a village in the Rural District in the Western Area of Sierra Leone. It is located about nineteen miles east of Freetown and about 8 miles north of Waterloo. The main industry in Kebbie Town is farming and fishing.

Kebbie Town is mainly inhabited by the Krio people. Most of the population of Kebbie Town are Christians. Kebbie Town is in very close proximity to the neighborhood towns of Kerry Town, Cole Town and Rocky.
