= Davidson Nicol =

Sierra Leone Creole academic, diplomat, physician, writer (1924–1994)

Davidson Nicol CMG
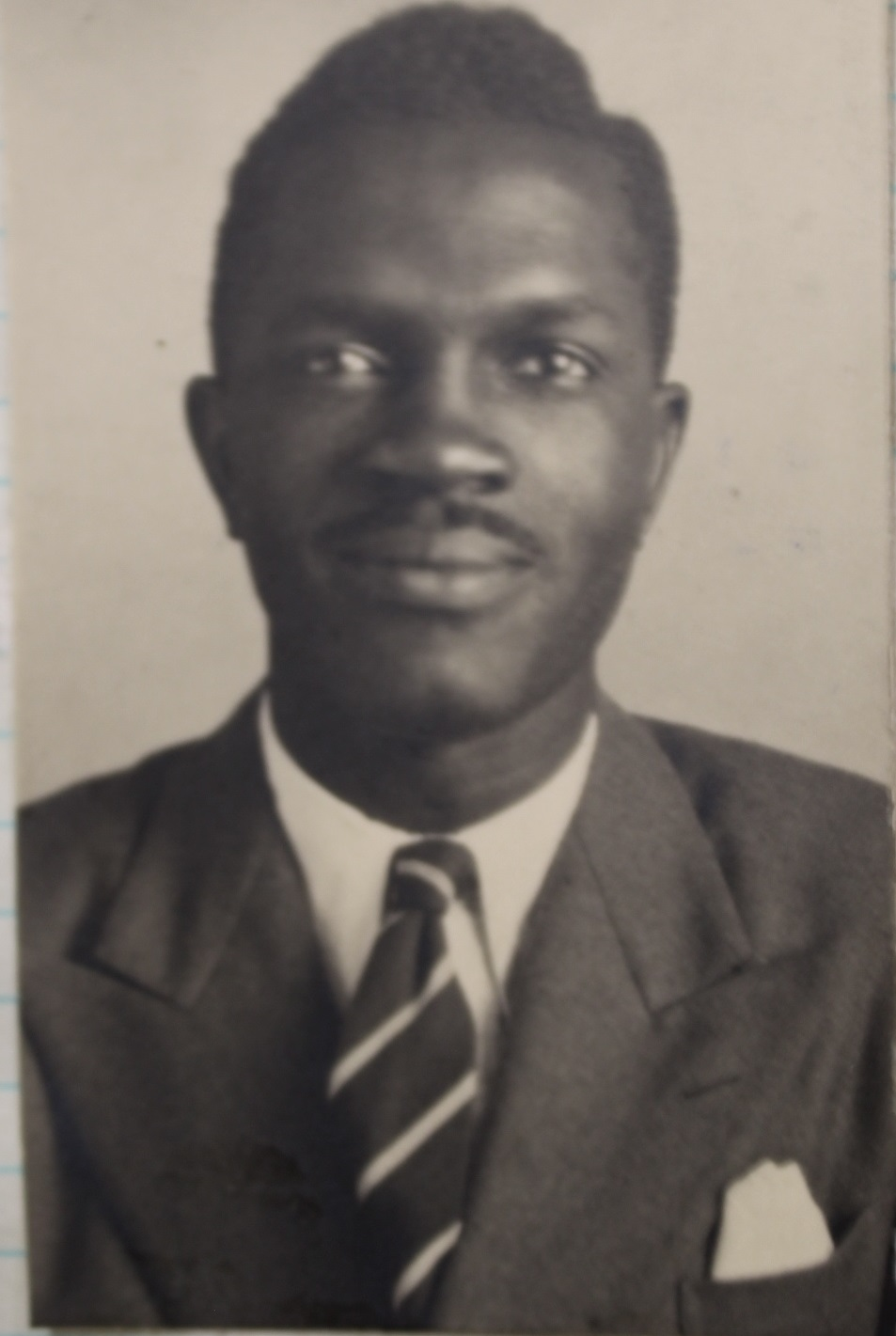
- Nicol c. 1948
- Born: 14 September 1924; Bathurst, Colony and Protectorate of Sierra Leone
- Died: 20 September 1994 (aged 70); Cambridge, England
- Occupations: Physician; professor; scientist; diplomat; writer; poet; historian
- Spouse: Marjorie Johnston (m. 1950)
- Children: 5
- Writing career
- Pen name: Abioseh Nicol

Davidson Sylvester Hector Willoughby Nicol CMG (14 September 1924 – 20 September 1994), also known by his pen name Abioseh Nicol, was a Sierra Leone Creole physician, diplomat, and writer. He was also one of the first directors of the Bank of Sierra Leone.

Nicol contributed significantly to diabetes research from his discoveries in his analysis of the breakdown of insulin in the human body. He was able to secure degrees in the arts, science and commercial disciplines and he contributed to science, history, and literature.

Nicol was the first black African to graduate with first-class honours from the University of Cambridge and he was also the first black African elected as a fellow of a college of Cambridge University.

== Early life ==
Nicol was born as Davidson Sylvester Hector Willoughby Nicol on 14 September 1924 in Bathurst, Sierra Leone, to Jonathan Josibiah Nicol and Winifred Clarissa Regina Willoughby. He taught at the Prince of Wales School in Freetown, the capital city of Sierra Leone, and studied on a scholarship at Christ's College, Cambridge University in the United Kingdom, graduating with a BA degree in natural science in 1947. He was the first black African to graduate with first-class honours. He earned a medical degree from London Hospital Medical College, now part of Queen Mary University of London. On 11 August 1950, he married Marjorie Johnston of Trinidad. Nicol had five children.

In the early 1950s, he taught at the Ibadan University medical school, researching topical malnutrition, before returning to Cambridge in 1954. In 1957, he was named the first black African Fellow of Christ's College, and went to the college to research insulin under famed scientist Frederick Sanger. Nicol published two works on the topic, The Mechanism of Action of Insulin and The Structure of Human Insulin, both in 1960. He had returned to Freetown in 1958, and was working for the Sierra Leonean government as a pathologist.

== Academia ==
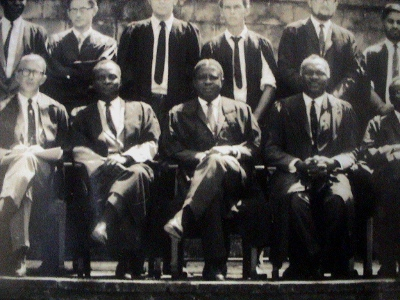
Nicol at Fourah Bay College (far right)

Beginning in 1960, Nicol was the first native principal of Fourah Bay College in Freetown for eight years. While principal of the college, he led a large expansion programme. Nicol was a member Public Service Commission until 1968. Nicol continued his administrative career at the university level in Sierra Leone as first the chairman (1964–68) then as Vice-Chancellor at the University of Sierra Leone (1966–68). In 1964, he was appointed a CMG.

== Diplomacy ==
Nicol left academia in 1968 to become the permanent representative of Sierra Leone to the United Nations (UN), in which role he served until 1971. That year, he became Sierra Leone's High Commissioner to the United Kingdom, which posting ended in 1972. From 1972 until 1982, Nicol served as the Under-Secretary-General of the United Nations under Austrian Kurt Waldheim. While holding this post, Nicol additionally served as head of the United Nations Institute for Training and Research (UNITAR). He was also at one point ambassador of Sierra Leone to Norway, Sweden, and Denmark. He was President of the United Nations Security Council in September 1970.

== Return to academia and retirement ==
He maintained a home for many years in Thornton Road, Cambridge, England, frequently visiting Christ's College, of which he had been made a distinguished Honorary Fellow, meanwhile serving from 1987 until retiring in 1991 as a visiting professor of international studies at the University of California (1987–88) and University of South Carolina (1990–91). Nicol retired in 1991 at the age of 67 to Cambridge, where he died on 20 September 1994 at the age of 70. He was president of the World Federation of United Nations Associations from 1983 to 1987.

== Nicol's writings ==
Beginning in 1965 with Two African Tales, Nicol was a published author of short stories, as well as poetry, music, academic literature and a biography of Africanus Horton, an early Sierra Leonean author and one of the founders of African nationalism. Nicol's last piece of published work was Creative Women in 1982.

== Selected bibliography ==
- Africa, A Subjective View, 1964
- Two African Tales, 1965
- The Truly Married Woman, and Other Stories, 1965
- Creative Women, 1982

== Sources ==
- Abioseh Nicol on the Literary Encyclopedia
- The Papers of Davidson Nicol held at Churchill Archives Centre
