= Trudy Morgan =

Sierra Leonean civil engineer

- Born: 1966 (age 59–60); Liverpool, England, UK

Trudy Morgan (born 1966) is a civil engineer of Sierra Leone heritage. She is the first African woman to be awarded a fellowship of the Institution of Civil Engineers (FICE), and, after becoming the first female vice president of the Sierra Leone Institution of Engineers, served two terms as president.

== Early life ==
Born to Sierra Leone Creole parents in Liverpool, United Kingdom, Morgan and her family moved back to Sierra Leone where she studied civil engineering at the University of Sierra Leone before earning an MBA at Cranfield School of Management.

== Career ==
In 2015, Morgan co-founded the non-profit Sierra Leone Women Engineers, to support women in engineering. In 2018, Morgan supported a United Nations Office of Project Services (UNOPS) project to stabilise the slopes of Sugar Loaf mountain, near Regent six miles from Freetown, following the 2017 Sierra Leone mudslides.

Morgan is also the program director for Hilton Freetown Cape Sierra Hotel, a member of the Professional Engineers Review Council and the UK's Institution of Civil Engineers international representative to Sierra Leone. From 2020 to 2024, she served two terms as president of the Sierra Leone Institution of Engineers.
