= Lemuel Adolphus Johnson =

Sierra Leonean academic (1941–2002)

Professor Lemuel Adolphus Johnson
- Born: Lemuel Adolphus Johnson; 15 December 1941; Nigeria
- Died: 12 March 2002 (aged 60); Michigan, United States
- Education: Oberlin College, Pennsylvania State University, University of Michigan
- Occupations: Academic, poet, university professor
- Spouse(s): Marian Yankson Johnson, nee Yankson

Lemuel Adolphus Johnson (15 December 1941 – 12 March 2002), was a Sierra Leonean professor, poet, and writer who was based at the University of Michigan.

== Early life ==
Lemuel Adolphus Johnson was born on 15 December 1941 to Sierra Leone Creole parents in Nigeria. Johnson was raised with a strong awareness of his Creole heritage and this would emerge as a feature of his literary works, notably in The Sierra Leone Trilogy.

His grandfather, Reverend Canon S.S. Williams, was a vicar at the Church of the Holy Trinity, Freetown, and part of Johnson's family had ancestral roots in Regent Village in the Colony of Sierra Leone.

== Education ==
Johnson was educated at the Sierra Leone Grammar School and in 1960 he received the highest scores in all West Africa on the Cambridge University Higher School Certificate examinations. In 1965, he graduated with a degree in Modern Languages from Oberlin College and an M.A. in Spanish from Pennsylvania State University in 1966. He subsequently earned a PhD in Comparative Literature from the University of Michigan in 1968.

Johnson was appointed as an assistant professor of English at the University of Michigan in 1966 and was eventually promoted to a full professorship. Between 1985 and 1991, he was a Director of the Center for Afro American and African Studies at the University of Michigan.

Johnson was appointed a Professor investigador at the Colegio de Mexico, Mexico City, and intermittently taught at Fourah Bay College, at the University of Sierra Leone, at the Faculty of Literature at the Salzberg Seminar, and as a Visiting Distinguished Professor at Oberlin College.

== Academic memberships and associations ==
Johnson was elected as the president of the African Literature Association and served in this role from 1977 to 1978. Johnson was also the Vice President of the Association of Caribbean Studies between 1983 and 1985, and he served on the Africa Committee of the Social Science Research Council between 1985 and 1990.

== Literary works ==
Johnson published several literary works, among them The Devil, the Gargoyle, & the Buffoon: The Negro as Metaphor in Western Literatures in 1970 and Shakespeare in Africa & Other Venues: Import and the Appropriation of Culture in 1998. He also published a translation of Rafael Alberti's play Night of War in the Prado Museum into English from the Spanish in 1969.

John also published a Sierra Leone Trilogy in 1995, which consisted of three volumes of poetry entitled Highlife for Caliban, Hand on the Navel, and Carnival of the Old Coast.

== Awards ==
Johnson received several awards at the University of Michigan, including the Steelcase Research Professorship at the Institute for the Humanities, the Faculty Recognition Award, a Recognition Award from the Center for Afro-American and African Studies, and a Certificate of Distinction for Outstanding Teaching.

== Personal life ==
Johnson married Marian Yankson, a Sierra Leonean in 1965 and the couple had two children, Yma Johnson and Yshelu Johnson.

Lemuel Johnson was fluent in several languages: Krio, the de facto national language of Sierra Leone, European languages such as Spanish, Portuguese, French, Italian, and German, as well as African languages including Igbo, Yoruba, and Hausa.

== Death ==
Johnson died at home in Michigan, aged 60, on 12 March 2002, after suffering from colon cancer for six months.

== Published works ==
- The Devil, the Gargoyle, & the Buffoon: The Negro as Metaphor in Western Literatures (1970)
- Sierra Leone Trilogy (1995)
- Shakespeare in Africa & Other Venues: Import and the Appropriation of Culture (1998)
