= 2017 Sierra Leone mudslides =

Mudslide disaster in Freetown, Sierra Leone

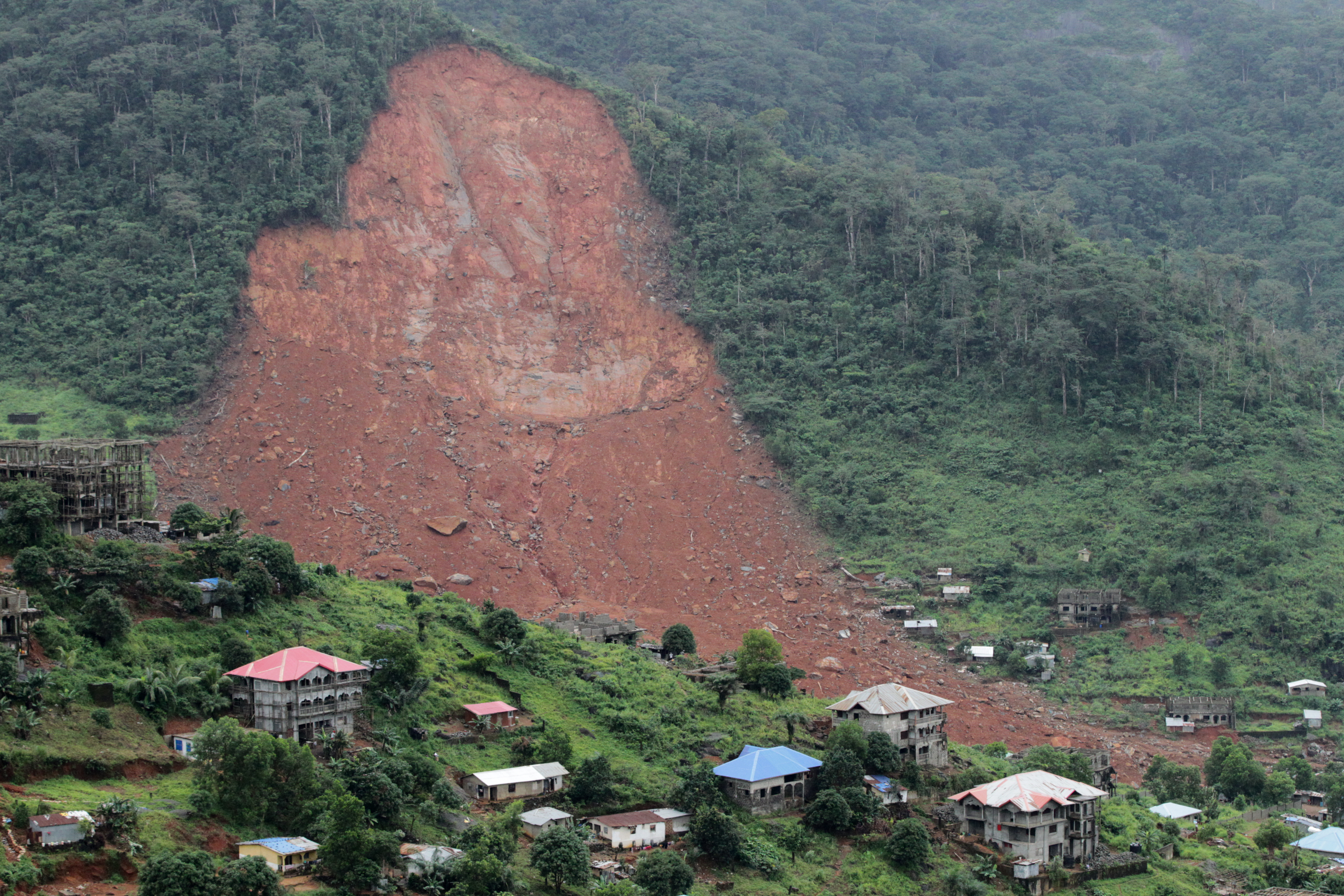
- Mass wasting of mud in Freetown on August 14, 2017

- Location of the Western Area in Sierra Leone where the mudslides occurred (in red)
- Date: August 14, 2017
- Time: 6:30 a.m. (06:30 UTC) (GMT)
- Location: Western Area Rural District, Sierra Leone; 8°26′2″N 13°13′22″W
- Type: Mudslide affecting 116,766 m^{2} (1,256,860 sq ft)
- Cause: Heavy rainfall; Deforestation; Soil erosion
- Deaths: 1,141
- Displaced: 3,000

On the morning of August 14, 2017, significant mudflow events occurred in and around the capital city of Freetown in Sierra Leone. Following three days of torrential rainfall, mass wasting of mud and debris damaged or destroyed hundreds of buildings in the city, killing 1,141 people and leaving more than 3,000 homeless.

Causal factors for the mudslides include the region's particular topography and climate – with Freetown's elevation close to sea level and its greater position within a tropical monsoon climate. Those factors were assisted by the generally poor state of the region's infrastructure and loss of protective natural drainage systems from periods of deforestation.

== Background ==
The potential for deadly flooding in Sierra Leone was exacerbated by a combination of factors. Freetown, which sits at the tip of a peninsula, was in 2015 occupied by approximately 1 million people. Freetown's topography alternates between thickly wooded and partially deforested mountains. These mountains run along the peninsula parallel to the Atlantic for 40 kilometres (25 mi). Freetown's elevation varies from coastal areas which are at or just below sea level to approximately 400 meters (1,300 ft) above sea level.

Freetown suffers from long-term issues involving poor urban development programs. According to Jamie Hitchen of the Africa Research Institute "the government is failing to provide housing for the poorest in society", and when attention is paid to issues such as unregulated construction, it is received only after a crisis. Because a moratorium on housing construction was not enforced, unorganized settlements and municipal works encroached on flood plains, resulting in narrower water passageways. During floods, Freetown's drainage systems are often blocked by discarded waste, especially in the city's poorer communities, contributing to higher levels of surface runoff.

The construction of large homes in hillside areas and unrestricted deforestation for residential purposes weakened the stability of nearby slopes and caused soil erosion. Within a decade leading up to the disaster, Sierra Leone cleared approximately 800,000 hectares (2,000,000 acres) of forest cover – the country's civil war, fought between 1991 and 2002, was also a cause of deforestation. The nation's Environmental Protective Agency launched a reforesting mission in the region two weeks prior to the floods and mudslides, which was ultimately unsuccessful.

== Mudslides ==
According to the National Weather Service's Climate Prediction Center, Sierra Leone experienced a particularly wet rainy season, with the capital city of Freetown, in the Western Area of the country, experiencing 41 inches (1,000 mm) of rainfall from July 1, 2017, leading up to the mudslides – nearly tripling the area's seasonal average. Sierra Leone's meteorological department did not warn residents to leave areas prone to flooding in time; from August 11 to 14, Freetown faced three consecutive days of rain, which led to severe flooding in the city and its surrounding suburbs. Flooding is an annual threat for the area: in 2015 floods killed 10 people and left thousands homeless.

=== Affected regions ===
Overlooking Freetown, Sugar Loaf mountain partially collapsed, triggering mudslides in the early morning of August 14, which damaged or completely submerged several houses and structures, killing residents – many still asleep – who were trapped inside. The collapse of the mountainside took place in two stages – with the lower slope sliding into the Babadorie River Valley and, 10 minutes later, the upper portion collapsing, resulting in a "tidal wave" of landmass and debris. Highly mobile, the saturated debris flow from the collapse of the upper mountainside, carrying mud, large boulders, tree trunks, and other material, advanced toward the main river channel, Lumley Creek, with a wall of flood water leading in front.

Another mudslide struck the Regent suburban district. A mountainous settlement 24 kilometres (15 mi) east of Freetown, Regent was covered by mud and debris when nearby hillsides collapsed around 6:00 GMT. The suburban districts of Goderich and Tacuguma were also hit by mudslides, but the under-developed areas did not sustain significant damage to infrastructure or loss of life.

=== Aftermath ===
The disaster caused damage to property in an area of 116,766 square metres (1,256,860 sq ft).

Accessibility between communities was lost: eight pedestrian roads and bridges connecting Kamayama and Kaningo took moderate or severe damage, and two road bridges on the Regent river channel were impacted; in total, the damages to pathways amounted to US$1 million in costs. Power outages occurred in several communities, partly due to the Electricity Distribution and Supply Authority's (EDSA) temporarily taking certain areas off the grid to avoid electrical incidents. The damage to EDSA's infrastructure totaled $174,000.

More than 3,000 people were left homeless by the disaster. An initial estimate of the death toll placed the number at 205, but rescue and aid workers cautioned that the survival rates for many of the 600 people still missing were slim. By August 27, local government and ministry officials reported 1,000 fatalities during religious services honoring the victims. The final official death toll declared 1,141 dead or missing.

== Response ==
Local organizations, military personnel, and the Red Cross of Sierra Leone contributed to immediate excavation and recovery efforts, working amid rainfall. The continued downpours and damaged passageways disrupted relief efforts, as did the topography of affected areas. The Red Cross and the federal government contributed fifteen vehicles, including three ambulances, to assist in traveling to isolated areas, while the United Nations Office on Drugs and Crime (UNODC) sent a joint team of forensic officers and specialized rescue units with trained dogs. The Connaught Hospital mortuary in Freetown was overwhelmed by nearly 300 bodies in the first day alone, forcing workers to lay victims on floors and outside the building to be identified. Due to the lack of manpower and threat of disease, bodies were buried in mass graves on August 15 at two sites in Waterloo.

Sierra Leone's Office for National Security (ONS) advised survivors to evacuate flood-prone areas. Additional evacuations took place when aerial images of a hillside adjacent to Sugar Loaf revealed the threat of another mudslide which could impact a much wider area. Response teams were deployed to two voluntary relocation centers, the Old Skool compound in Hill Station and Juba barracks in Lumley, where workers distributed sanitation and medical supplies. By August 16, workers in Regent and Kaningo began constructing emergency latrines and four 10,000-liter water harvesting systems. Unsanitary waters raised fears of cholera; however, workers provided storage tanks, purification tablets, and instructional courses on hygiene to help prevent an outbreak of waterborne diseases. The government of Sierra Leone also launched its first ever cholera vaccination campaign on September 15, targeting over 500,000 citizens in the Western Area. After the disaster, affected areas faced water shortages; as a result, UNICEF distributed 26,000 liters of drinking water each day.

President Ernest Bai Koroma addressed Sierra Leone in a national broadcast August 15, declaring a state of emergency and announcing the establishment of a relief center in Regent. He urged the nation, still recovering from the aftermath of the Ebola outbreak, to remain unified: "Our nation has once again been gripped by grief. Many of our compatriots have lost their lives, many more have been gravely injured and billions of Leones' worth of property destroyed in the flooding and landslides that swept across some parts of our city". He also addressed the coordination of registries in Freetown that provided aid for residents left without shelter. On August 15, the president declared seven days of national mourning, which would begin immediately.

=== Foreign assistance ===
Koroma made an appeal to the international community for relief. Already in the country, numerous international organisations acted immediately, providing basic supplies and services – from food and shelter to personal counselling and mobile phones. Among others, Action Against Hunger, CARE International, GOAL, Handicap International, Muslim Aid, Plan International, Red Cross, Save the Children, Streetchild, Trocaire, UK Aid, World Vision and various UN agencies were involved.

Several European countries responded with donations: the United Kingdom provided £5 million for clean drinking water and medicine, Ireland donated €400,000, Spain donated €50,000 and assembled a technical forensic team, and Switzerland spent CHF400,000 to provide sanitation and first-aid kits . West African country donations included $500,000 from Togo, medical supplies distributed by Liberia, and pledges for support by Guinea and Nigeria. Other governments such as China donated $1 million through their embassy in Freetown, and Israel sent an envoy supplying food and medical supplies. In response to the disaster, the United Nations (UN) arranged contingency plans to mitigate potential outbreaks of waterborne diseases. The UN's migration agency allocated $150,000 in initial-response aid and mobilized personnel in Sierra Leone to assist in rescue operations and distribute supplies to survivors. The World Food Programme (WFP) provided rations for 7,500 people. The European Union (EU) authorized €300,000 for humanitarian aid on August 16. On August 17, the International Federation of Red Cross and Red Crescent Societies (IFRC) approved CHF4.6 million worth of aid to be distributed through the Sierra Leone Red Cross agency for use over a 10-month period.

Three months removed from the disaster, the Sierra Leone government announced the closure of emergency camps, which housed many families awaiting financial assistance. About 98 families from the UK-Aid and World Food Programme-sponsored camps received assistance, yet nearly 500 families housed in informal refuges had not prior to the November 15 deadline.

In 2018, a United Nations Office of Project Services (UNOPS) project was undertaken to stabilise the slopes of Sugar Loaf mountain, coordinated by local engineer Trudy Morgan.
