= Hastings, Sierra Leone =

Hastings
- Location in Sierra Leone
- Coordinates: 8°23′N 13°08′W
- Country: Sierra Leone
- Region: Western Area
- District: Western Area Rural District

Government
  - Headman: Abdul Sesay

Population (2004)
  - Total: 15,054
- Time zone: UTC0 (Greenwich Mean Time)

Hastings is a town in the Western Area Rural District of Sierra Leone. The town had a population of 15,054 (2004 census) and lies approximately 15 miles east of Freetown, the capital of the country.

Hastings is twinned with Hastings, UK.

== Notable residents ==
- Daniel Coker: African American Methodist missionary and immigrant from Baltimore, Maryland, to Sierra Leone in 1820; his descendants still live in Freetown
- John Ulrich Graf: Anglican minister at St Thomas Church, Hastings 1837-1853
- Francis Sundima Harding: Methodist Youth chairman, born Sierra Leone
