= Fogbo =

Town in Western Area, Sierra Leone

- Location in Sierra Leone
- Coordinates: 8°16′05″N 12°58′48″W
- Country: Sierra Leone
- Region: Western Area
- District: Western Area Rural District

Government
  - Type: Village Council
  - Village Head: Ibrahim Sorie Kamara

Population (2012)
  - Total: 2,000 residents
- Time zone: UTC-5 (GMT)

Fogbo is a small coastal fishing town in the Western Area Rural District of Sierra Leone. Fogbo is in close proximity to the town of Tombo. The major industry in Fogbo is fishing and small scale farming. Tombo has an estimated population of 2,000 residents.

The population of Fogbo is ethnically diverse, and its inhabitants are predominantly muslims.
