= Tokeh, Sierra Leone =

- Location in Sierra Leone
- Coordinates: 8°20′N 13°04′W
- Country: Sierra Leone
- Region: Western Area
- District: Western Area Rural District

Government
  - Type: Town council
  - Town Head: Alhaji James Slow
- Time zone: UTC-5 (GMT)

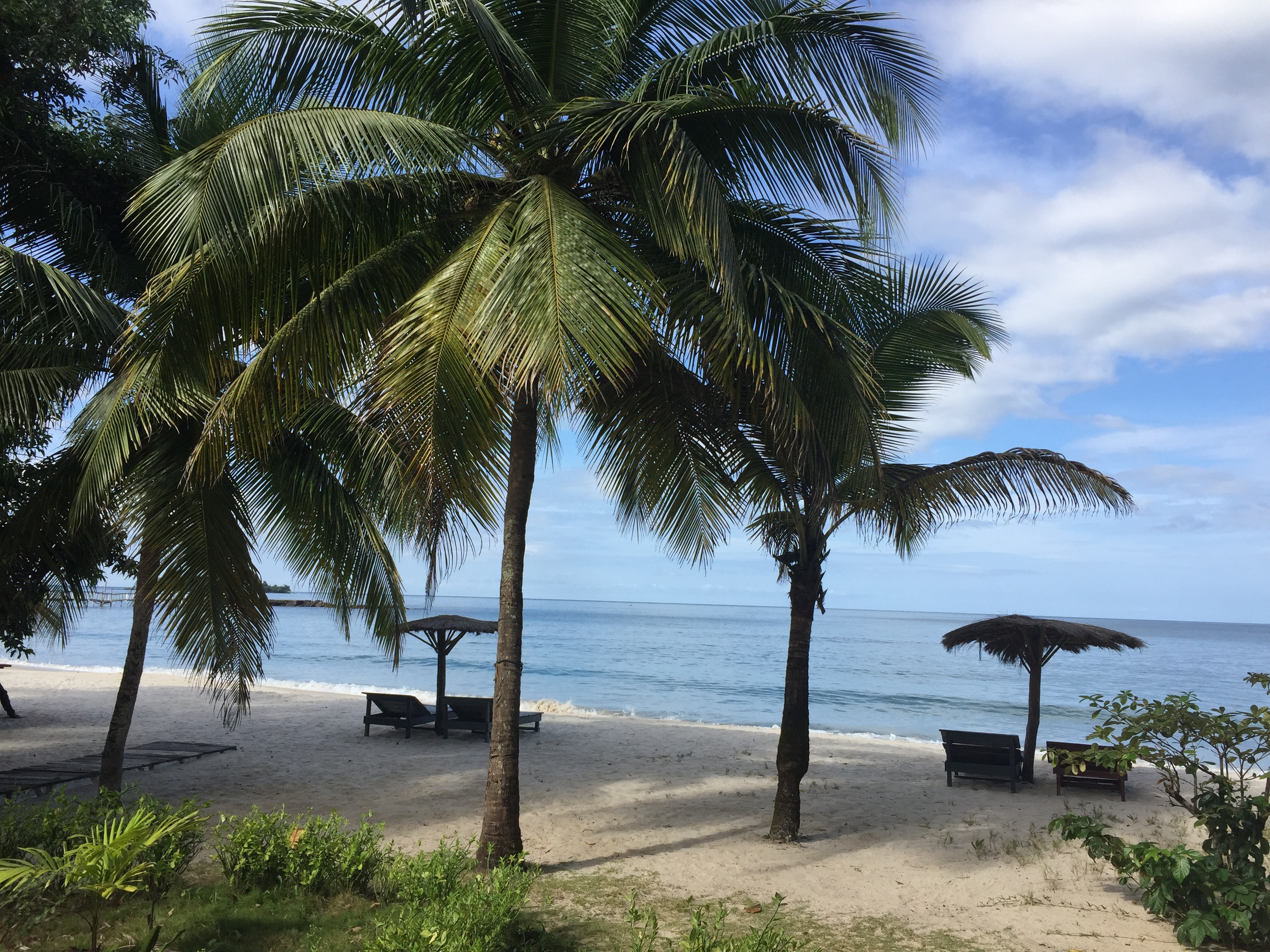
Tokeh Beach

Tokeh Also known as Tokeh Town is a coastal resort town along the peninsula in the Western Area Rural District of Sierra Leone. Tokeh lies approximately twenty miles east of Freetown and near the neighborhood town of York. The major economic activity in Tokeh is fishing and tourism.

Tokeh is home to a large resort of sand beaches known collectively as Tokeh Beach, which attract a large number of tourists to the town . The Tokeh beach is one of the largest and most attractive beaches in West Africa. Tokeh is also known for its mountains, forests, resort hotels, and nearby Tokeh Island, an uninhabited island a short boat ride from Tokeh town.

Tokeh is a predominantly Muslim town, and its people are ethnically diverse among Krio. Temne, Loko, Sherbro, Mandingo, Limba, Mende and Fula. Tokeh is a principle home of the Krio Muslim people (locally known as Oku), who are politically influential in the town.

Although part of the Western Area Rural District, Tokeh has its own locally governed directly elected town council headed by a Town Head. The current Town Head of Loko is Alhaji James Slow, who was elected in the 2013 Tokeh Town Head Rural District municipal election .

== History ==
The village of Tokeh was founded by a Sherbro fisherman named Pa Baw in the colonial era. Pa Baw settled along the river in Tokeh village.

In 1968, land in Tokeh was acquired by Sierra Leonean barrister Shakib Basma. In partnership with a French company, he developed the Africana Tokey Village resort, which expanded to 400 rooms and employed up to 600 staff during its peak in the 1980s. The resort operated until the mid-1990s, when operations ceased due to the Sierra Leone Civil War. Although the structures survived initial rebel attacks, the property was subsequently looted and abandoned.

In 2003 Issa Shakib Basma, son of shakib basma returned to Sierra Leone to revamp the properties and rebuild the resort. Tokeh Beach Resort started in 2011 with Tokeh Sands, an 18-room resort with restaurant and bar. Tokeh Palms, a 16-suite resort, was completed in 2013, expansions and development are still in progress. The Basma family have helped develop Tokeh village since the '60s. The church, mosque, community centre & primary school are made on the land donated by Shakib Basma, expanding a village of approximately 80 people in the '60s to close to 6000 inhabitants today.

Opening of The Place Tokeh Village got worldwide attention & recognition when an Australian business man Mr. Chris Brown who was also associated with London Mining opened his luxurious 5 star beach resort by the name of The Place in 2013 which was inaugurated by the President of Sierra Leone H.E Dr. Ernest Bai Koroma, (www.stayatheplace.com) is probably the only true 5 star resort in Sierra Leone. The Place resort under the guidance of Mr. Chris Brown build a dam which supplies water to The Place resort & Tokeh community, build a school worth US$40,000, which is known as the Kulafai school (near the junction & new site) supplied schools & hospital with furnitures & medicines as a part of Corporate Social Responsibility (CSR). Apart from that majority of employees work at The Place resort & regular training is conducted to engage youth & females from the community.
