= Sussex, Sierra Leone =

- Location in Sierra Leone
- Coordinates: 8°20′N 13°04′W
- Country: Sierra Leone
- Region: Western Area
- District: Western Area Rural District

Government
  - Type: Village council
  - Village Head: Elliot Moira
- Time zone: UTC-5 (GMT)

Sussex is a coastal fishing village, near the town of York, around the peninsular, in the Western Area Rural District of Sierra Leone. The major industry in Sussex is fishing, alongside coal and stone mining. The village lies about twenty five miles outside Freetown.

The village was first inhabited by the Sherbro in 1750. Sussex was later settled by liberated African American slaves in 1824.

The population of Sussex village is about equally split between the Sherbros and the descendants of the liberated African American slaves known as the Creole. The population of Sussex is virtually all christians.

== History ==
The village was first inhabited by sherbro in 1750. Sussex was later settled by liberated African American slaves in 1824.
