= Kwama, Sierra Leone =

Kwama
- Location in Sierra Leone
- Coordinates: 8°20′N 13°04′W
- Country: Sierra Leone
- Region: Western Area
- District: Western Area Rural District

Government
  - Type: Town council
  - Town Head: Sulaiman Sankoh

Population (2012)
  - Total: 6,000
- Time zone: UTC-5 (GMT)

Kwama is a rural town that is made up of several combine villages along the peninsular in the Western Area Rural District of Sierra Leone. Kwama lies approximately seven miles from Waterloo and about twenty one miles east of Freetown. Kwama seats on the Freetown-Waterloo highway. The major economic activity in Kwama is farming. As of 2012 the population of Kwama is estimated at 6,000 people

The population of Kwama is predominantly from the Loko ethnic group. Minority ethnic groups in Kwama include the Limba and Temne.

Although Kwama is part of the Western Area Rural District Council, Kwama has its own locally directly elected Town Council headed by a Town Head. The current Town Head of Kwama is Sulaiman Sankoh, who was elected in the 2013 Kwama Town Head municipal election.
