= Dr. Oloh =

- Also known as: Dr. Oloh
- Born: Oloh Israel Olufemi Cole; March 20, 1944; Leicester, Sierra Leone
- Died: October 13, 2007
- Genres: afropop, jazz
- Formerly of: Milo Jazz

Israel Olorunfeh Cole (March 20, 1944 – October 13, 2007) better known by his stage name Dr. Oloh was a Sierra Leonean afropop and Jazz musician. Dr Oloh is widely considered one of the biggest musicians from Sierra Leone. His hit singles were very popular in Sierra Leone in the 1970s, 1980s and early 1990s.

== Early life and career ==
Israel Olorunfeh Cole, commonly known as Dr. Oloh was born on March 20, 1944, in the mountain village of Leicester, near Freetown in the Western Area of Sierra Leone to a Nigerian mother and a Creole father. He led a band known as Milo Jazz. He was awarded the OR (Order of Rokel) by the Sierra Leonean Government in 1989. Oloh and his band toured the United Kingdom a couple of times.

He died on October 13, 2007, after a short illness.
