= No. 490 Squadron RNZAF =

No. 490 (NZ) Squadron RAF
- Active: 28 March 1943 – 1 August 1945
- Country: United Kingdom
- Allegiance: New Zealand
- Branch: Royal Air Force
- Role: Anti-submarine; Maritime Reconnaissance
- Mottos: Māori: Taniwha kei runga (Translation: "The Taniwha is in the air")
- Engagements: Second World War

Insignia
- Squadron Badge: An arm couped below the elbow, holding in the hand a patu

Aircraft flown
- Reconnaissance: Consolidated Catalina; Twin-engined flying boat; Short Sunderland; Four-engined flying boat

No. 490 (NZ) Squadron was an anti-submarine and maritime reconnaissance squadron of Coastal Command established for service during the Second World War. It was a New Zealand squadron formed under Article XV of the Empire Air Training Plan. Although many of its flying personnel were drawn from the Royal New Zealand Air Force, the squadron served under the operational and administrative command of the Royal Air Force.

Formed in March 1943, No. 490 Squadron was based at Jui, near Freetown, in West Africa and initially flew the Consolidated Catalina flying boat. Becoming operational in July, its work mainly consisted of escorting convoys, carrying out maritime patrols, and search and rescue missions along the coast of West Africa. It began using the Short Sunderland flying boat in 1944 but by this time the threat that U-boats posed to convoys in the area was largely non-existent and the squadron saw little enemy action. It was disbanded in August 1945.

== Background ==
In the mid-1930s, the Royal Air Force (RAF) was in the process of expanding and required an increasing number of suitable flying personnel. A number of schemes were implemented for New Zealanders to obtain short-service commissions in the RAF with the intention of then transferring to the Royal New Zealand Air Force (RNZAF) in the future. This led to over 500 New Zealanders serving in the RAF by the time of the outbreak of the Second World War.

In December 1939, at a meeting in Ottawa by representatives of the British, New Zealand, Canadian and Australian governments, it was agreed that their air forces would co-ordinate and combine training of air crews, under what became known as the Empire Air Training Scheme (EATS). New Zealand committed to initially provide 880 fully-trained pilots for the RAF and, for each year that the scheme continued, to send a further 520 pilots trained to an elementary standard. Under a clause of the agreement, Article XV, squadrons of the three Dominion air forces would be specifically formed for war service within RAF operational commands; these Article XV squadrons were to be financed (including pay) by the British government and equipped with aircraft from RAF stocks. Initially, the Dominions would provide both ground staff and flying personnel.

In practice, because the New Zealand government found it difficult to fully staff squadrons in Europe, its Article XV squadrons were formed mostly around cadres of New Zealand flying personnel serving in the RAF, supplemented by newly-trained aircrew from the RNZAF; administrative and other ground staff were provided purely by the RAF. The New Zealand government had little influence in the organisation and operational use of its Article XV squadrons and in fact, around 90% of RNZAF personnel sent to Europe were posted to non-Article XV squadrons.

== History ==
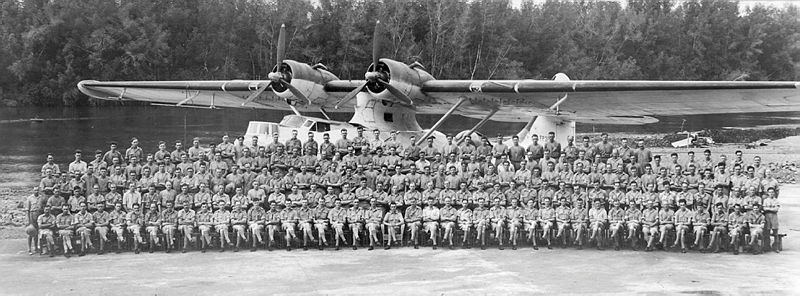
A group of No. 490 Squadron personnel in front of a Consolidated Catalina flying boat at Jui, near Freetown, June 1943

No. 490 Squadron was formed on 28 March 1943 at Jui near Freetown in what is now present-day Sierra Leone. The last of the seven New Zealand Article XV squadrons, it had been intended that the squadron would be located so it could operate over the Indian Ocean, but the need for more Coastal Command squadrons for coverage of the convoy routes along the west coast of Africa dictated a change in destination to Jui. The first personnel to arrive at Jui, located on a strip of land of extending into an estuary and surrounded by mangrove swamps, was the ground crew. The aircrew began flying their aircraft in from Scotland, where they had received training at Stranraer, in June. The unit was led by Wing Commander D. W. Baird, who had previously commanded RNZAF forces in Fiji.

Equipped with Consolidated Catalina flying boats, No. 490 Squadron was tasked with patrolling for submarines, escorting convoys, and search and rescue missions, both from Jui and from Fisherman's Lake in Liberia. Its first operation was as a convoy escort on 2 July. On 7 August the squadron rescued its first seamen, 39 survivors from the merchant ship Fernhill that had been sunk by a torpedo about 400 miles (640 km) from Freetown. This involved a Catalina flying station over the seamen, who had taken to life rafts, while a second guided another ship to pick them up. Just a few days later, a U-boat was sighted and attacked. Four depth charges were dropped and appeared to have damaged the steering of the U-boat, which then submerged. However, most patrols were uneventful as U-boat activity was on the decline and their crews very cautious, operating at the fringe of the squadron's air coverage. In early December, there was a brief flurry of action when a ship was torpedoed near Freetown and the squadron sought out the attacking U-boat, but without success.

Wing Commander B. S. Nicholl took over in December 1943 and oversaw the squadron's conversion to Short Sunderland flying boats the following year. By this time, an advance base for the squadron had been established at Fisherman's Lake in Liberia. The U-boat threat had now largely disappeared but the squadron still escorted convoys and carried out patrols. Despite the boredom, there was still risk to flying personnel, often through the storms that affected the area of operations. One Sunderland was forced down 200 miles (320 km) from land due to damage from a storm on 13 July 1944. Two crew members were lost, trapped in the sinking aircraft, and the others spent 24 hours in life rafts without food and water before being rescued.

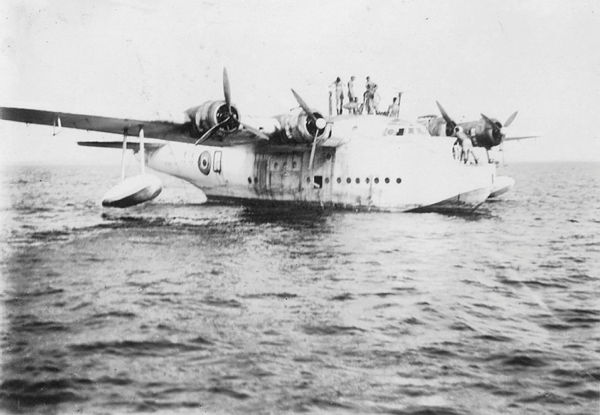
A Short Sunderland of No. 490 Squadron with some crew standing on the top of the fuselage waiting for the refueling barge while on the Gambia River

In October 1944, Wing Commander T. S. Gill was appointed commander of the squadron. It flew its last operation on 6 May 1945, and when it became obvious that No. 490 Squadron would not be needed in Japan, the squadron was disbanded on 1 August.

=== Operational summary ===
Of all the New Zealand squadrons of the RAF, No. 490 Squadron saw the least action, but nonetheless flew 463 operational sorties, totalling 4853 hours. One Distinguished Flying Cross was awarded to squadron personnel.

The squadron's motto, in Māori, the indigenous language of New Zealand, was Taniwha kei runga which translates as "Taniwha in the air". Taniwha are mythical intelligent monsters in Māori legend, occasionally but not particularly accurately translated as "dragons". An arm couped below the elbow, holding in the hand a patu (club) was selected as the squadron's badge.

== Commanding officers ==
The following served as commanding officers of No. 490 Squadron:

- Wing Commander D. W. Baird (June–December 1943);
- Wing Commander B. S. Nicholl (December 1943–October 1944);
- Wing Commander T. F. Gill (October 1944–August 1945).
