= 2019 Sierra Leone National Premier League =

Sierra Leone National Premier League
- Season: 2019
- Champions: East End Lions FC
- Top goalscorer: Musa Noah Kamara (15 goals)
- Average attendance: 1,791

The 2019 Sierra Leone National Premier League is the 32nd season of the Sierra Leone National Premier League, the top-tier football league in Sierra Leone. The season started on 27 January 2019.

This is the first edition held since the 2014 season, which was abandoned due to the Ebola outbreak.

== Standings ==
Pos	Team	Pld	W	D	L	GF	GA	GD	Pts
1	East End Lions (C)	24	13	11	0	32	10	+22	50
2	FC Kallon	24	12	10	2	30	13	+17	46
3	Kamboi Eagles	24	8	11	5	29	21	+8	35
4	Ports Authority	24	10	5	9	18	17	+1	35
5	Mighty Blackpool	23	8	9	6	18	17	+1	33
6	Central Parade	24	8	8	8	24	24	0	32
7	Freetown City	24	7	9	8	18	19	−1	30
8	Old Edwardians	24	6	9	9	19	23	−4	27
9	East End Tigers	24	6	8	10	17	22	−5	26
10	Diamond Stars	24	5	11	8	20	28	−8	26
11	Bo Rangers	24	6	7	11	14	19	−5	25
12	RSLAF	23	5	7	11	17	25	−8	22
13	Anti Drugs Strikers	24	3	11	10	10	28	−18	20

Updated to match(es) played on unknown. Source: RSSSF
(C) Champions

== Attendances ==
#	Football club	Average attendance
1	FC Kallon	11,375
2	East End Lions	5,926
3	Mighty Blackpool	927
4	Kamboi Eagles	764
5	Ports Authority FC	698
6	Bo Rangers	683
7	Diamond Stars	512
8	Freetown City FC	474
9	Central Parade FC	462
10	Old Edwardians	431
11	East End Tigers	389
12	RSLAF FC	347
13	Anti Drugs Strikers	276
