= Samuel Town, Sierra Leone =

- Location in Sierra Leone
- Coordinates: 8°20′N 13°04′W
- Country: Sierra Leone
- Region: Western Area
- District: Western Area Rural District
- Time zone: UTC-5 (GMT)

Samuel Town is a village in the Western Area Rural District of Sierra Leone. Farming is the major economic activity in the village. . Samuel Town lies about five miles from the Rural District main city of Waterloo and approximately 20 miles outside Freetown.

== Demographics ==
The Mende people are the principal inhabitant of Samuel Town and they also make up the vast majority of the population in the town. The Limba and Krio are the largest minorities that reside in the town.

== History ==
Samuel Town was originally known as Samai Town, named after its founder, a great Mende warrior from the south of Sierra Leone, named Pa Samai. Pa Samai is believed to have fought in the Boma War and the First World War.
