= Victoria Kanu =

Sierra Leonean poet (born 2008)

Victoria Kanu (12 May 2008) is a Sierra Leonean poet, better known under her pen name Vicky the Poet. She rose to fame after reading an elegiac poem for the victims of the 2017 Sierra Leone mudslides. At several occasions, she presented her poetry in front of the former President of Sierra Leone, Ernest Bai Koroma. She has been named one of the 50 most influential people in Sierra Leone.

== Life ==
Victoria Kanu was born on 12 May 2008 in Freetown, Sierra Leone, as the child of Alim Kanu and Yvette Gertrude Kanu. Ethnically, she is a part of the Temne people, and the family is Christian. She studied at the Becklyn Preparatory School, and later at the Faith Montessori International Ghana College.

She began working as a poet when she was 6 years old. She first gained a lot of attention and recognition after an elegiac poem for the victims of the 2017 Sierra Leone mudslides. Her oral poetry has since then focused on subjects such as child marriage, female genital mutilation, child labour and other social issues. Her poetry has become popular and well known in Sierra Leone. The United Nations Population Fund has called her a national icon, and she has appeared at most major forums in the country. She has also implemented a hub initiative for spoken word and poetry. At several occasions, she has presented her poetry in front of Ernest Bai Koroma, the former President of Sierra Leone. She has also become central within the entertainment and education industry in Sierra Leone. She has been named the Gospel Academy Poet of the Year, and won the Sierra Leone Young Writers Competition. She has also been named one of the 50 most influential Sierra Leoneans.
