= Russell, Sierra Leone =

Russel
- Location in Sierra Leone
- Coordinates: 8°20′N 13°04′W
- Country: Sierra Leone
- Region: Western Area
- District: Western Area Rural District

Government
  - Type: Village council
  - Village Head: Olu Jesse John
- Time zone: UTC-5 (GMT)

Russell is a coastal village, near the city of Waterloo in the Western Area Rural District of Sierra Leone. Russel is located around the peninsular on the Freetown-Waterloo highway next to the neighborhood village of Tissana.

The major economic activity in Russel is farming. The population of Russel is predominantly from the Loko ethnic group. Small minority communities in the village include Creole and Temne. The village is home to its own police station, run by the Sierra Leone Police force.
