= Dublin, Banana Islands =

Dublin
- Location in Sierra Leone
- Coordinates: 8°7′0″N 13°13′0″W
- Country: Sierra Leone
- Region: Western Area
- District: Western Area Rural District

Government
  - Type: Village council
  - Village Head: Ellis Wray

Population (2012)
  - Total: 842 people
- Time zone: UTC-5 (GMT)

Dublin is a large coastal fishing village on the Banana Islands in the Western Area Rural District of Sierra Leone. The name Dublin was possibly given by an Anglo-Irish agent of the Royal African Company in the 1680s. Dublin is one of three islands that make up the Banana Islands; the others are Ricketts and Mes-Meheux.

Dublin is known for its large beaches, hills and fishing. The major industry in Dublin is fishing and tourism. As of 2012, Dublin had a population of 842 people. Like the rest of the Banana Islands, Dublin is reached by boat from Kent, easily arranged by the resort.

The population of Dublin is largely from the Creole and Sherbro ethnic groups. The Sherbro have settled in Dublin since the early 18th century.

The inhabitants of Dublin are mainly the descendants of freed African Americans, West Indians (mostly from Jamaica) and liberated African slaves who were resettled on the Banana Islands in the mid 19th century. Dublin and the whole of the Banana Islands served as one of the transit centres for slaves bought from Sierra Leone and transported to the Americas during the slave era.
