= Musa Noah Kamara =

Sierra Leonean footballer (born 2000)

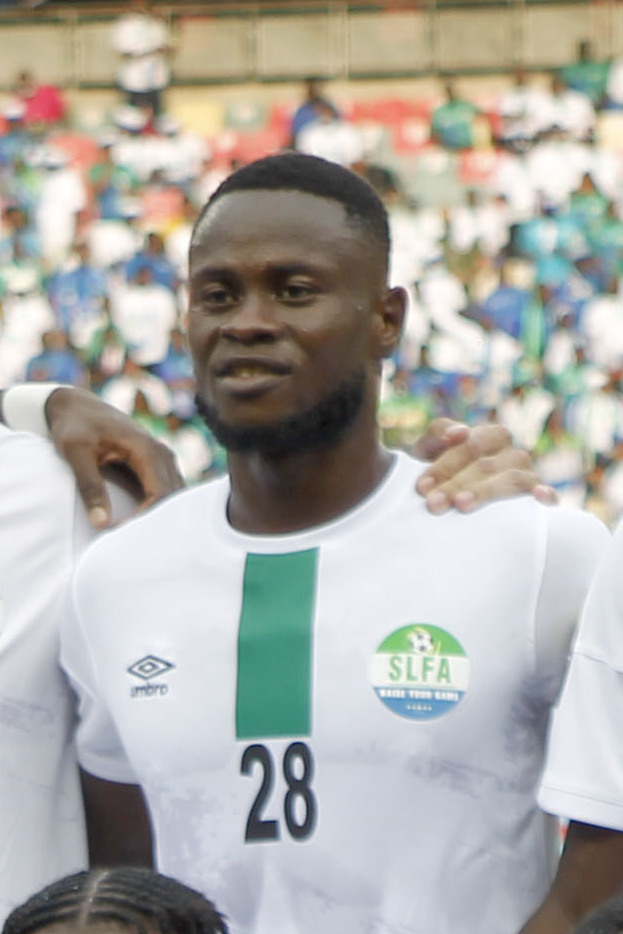
- Kamara in 2022

Personal information
- Full name: Musa Noah Kamara
- Date of birth: 6 August 2000 (age 26)
- Place of birth: Tombo, Sierra Leone
- Height: 1.83 m (6 ft 0 in)
- Position: Striker

Team information
- Current team: East End Lions
- Number: 9

Senior career*
Years	Team	Apps	(Gls)
2018	AIK Freetong		
2019	East End Lions		(15)
2019	Trelleborgs FF	0	(0)
2020–2021	East End Lions		
2021–2022	Bo Rangers		(19)
2022	Al-Ittihad		
2022–	Bo Rangers		(14)

International career^{‡}
2018	Sierra Leone U20	1	(0)
2018–	Sierra Leone	16	(4)
- * Club domestic league appearances and goals as of 30 June 2024 ‡ National team caps and goals as of 20 March 2025

Musa Noah Kamara (born 6 August 2000) is a Sierra Leonean professional footballer who plays as a striker for Bo Rangers and the Sierra Leone national team.

== Club career ==
Kamara was born in Tombo. After playing for AIK Freetong in 2018, he was the top scorer of the 2019 Sierra Leone National Premier League with 15 goals for champions East End Lions. He joined Swedish club Trelleborgs FF on a three-and-a-half-year deal in August 2019, but cancelled his contract after a week, citing the cold weather in Sweden. He retracted that statement the following day however, and insisted that he returned to Sierra Leone to play for the national team in the upcoming World Cup qualification fixtures. He transferred to Bo Rangers in April 2021.

Kamara won the highest goal scorer at the Sierra Leone Premier League (SLPL) since it was founded in 1994 with 12 goals by Sierra Leonean football legend Mohamed Kallon.

== International career ==
Having previously represented Sierra Leone at under-20 level, Kamara made his senior debut for Sierra Leone against Liberia on 26 July 2018. He represented Sierra Leone at the 2019 WAFU Cup of Nations. He did not travel to Kono to play a friendly match in November 2019 after suffering a bereavement, but received a two match international ban from the Sierra Leone Football Association after it was discovered he played a community match in Freetown during this period.

Kamara was called up to Sierra Leone's squad for the 2021 Africa Cup of Nations tournament, which began in January 2022. He scored his first international goal with a "magnificent left-footed strike" in a 2–2 draw with Ivory Coast in Sierra Leone's second group match on 16 January 2022. He appeared in their third group match as they were eliminated from the competition after a 1–0 defeat to Equatorial Guinea.

== Career statistics ==
=== International ===
As of match played 25 March 2025

Appearances and goals by national team and year
National team	Year	Apps	Goals
Sierra Leone	2018	1	0
Sierra Leone	2019	2	0
Sierra Leone	2020	2	0
Sierra Leone	2021	–	
Sierra Leone	2022	5	3
Sierra Leone	2023	2	0
Sierra Leone	2024	2	0
Sierra Leone	2025	2	1
Total		16	4

Scores and results list Sierra Leone's goal tally first, score column indicates score after each Kamara goal.

List of international goals scored by Musa Noah Kamara
No.	Date	Venue	Opponent	Score	Result	Competition
1	13 June 2022	Japoma Stadium, Douala, Cameroon	Ivory Coast	1–1	2–2	2021 Africa Cup of Nations
2	13 June 2022	General Lansana Conté Stadium, Conakry, Guinea	Guinea-Bissau	2–2	2–2	2023 Africa Cup of Nations qualification
3	27 August 2022	SKD Stadium, Paynesville, Liberia	Mali	1–2	1–2	2022 African Nations Championship qualification
4	20 March 2025	SKD Stadium, Paynesville, Liberia	Guinea-Bissau	2–0	3–1	2026 FIFA World Cup qualification
