= Tissana =

- Location in Sierra Leone
- Coordinates: 8°20′N 13°04′W
- Country: Sierra Leone
- Region: Western Area
- District: Western Area Rural District

Government
  - Type: Village council
  - Village Head: Sallieu SB Kamara
- Time zone: UTC-5 (GMT)

Tissana is a coastal village near the city of Waterloo in the Western Area Rural District of Sierra Leone. Tissana village is near the neighborhood village of Russell along the Freetown-Waterloo highway. The major economic activities in Tissana are the processing of salt, palm oil, and tourism.

Tissana is known for its highly respected culture and its deep traditional African beliefs and practices. Tissana village is home to the Poro, Bondo, Goboi and Jollay secret societies. The village traditionally performs native cultural dances.

The inhabitants of Tissana are ethnically and religiously diverse among traditional African beliefs, Muslims, and Christians. Its population is predominantly from the Temne, Sherbro, Susu, Mende and Krio ethnic groups. Tissana is home to a large mosque and a church as well as a small hospital and public schools. The village is also known for its religious tolerance.

== History ==
The village of Tissana was founded by Sherbro fishermen and farmers from the town of Shenge. They named the area Tissana which means new town in the Sherbro language.
