= Sugar Loaf (Freetown) =

Mountain in Sierra Leone

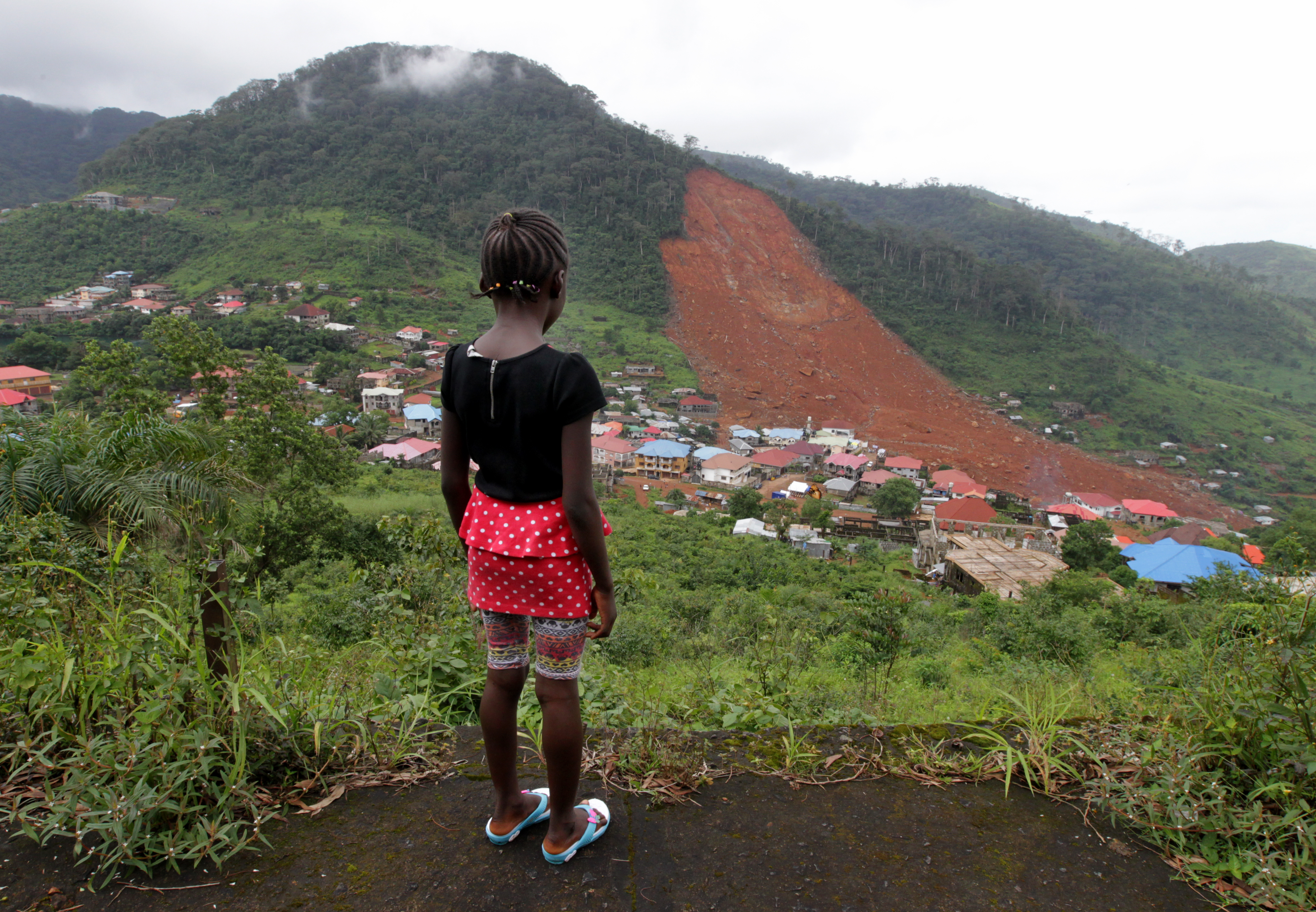
The mountain after a 2017 landslide

Mountains with a similar name are listed at Sugarloaf_(mountain)

Sugar Loaf is a forested mountain in the Western Area Rural District of Sierra Leone in west Africa. The capital city of Freetown is built around its lower slopes. Parts of the mountain are protected as the Western Area Forest Reserve.

The 19th-century British missionary George Thompson documented his ascent of Sugar Loaf in his 1859 book The Palm Land; Or, West Africa, Illustrated.

On Monday 14 August, 2017 in the 2017 Sierra Leone mudslides a landslide triggered by heavy rains swept down one of its flanks and inundated a part of the urban area of Regent with mud with many deaths reported.
