= Koya =

Koya may refer to:

== Places ==
=== Iraq ===
- Koya; (Arabic: كيويسنجق), a town in Iraqi Kurdistan
  - Koya University, a university in that town

=== Japan ===
- Mount Kōya, a mountain in Japan
  - Kōya, Wakayama, a town on the top of Mount Kōya
- Kōya Station (Tokyo), a train station in Adachi, Tokyo, Japan
- Nankai Kōya Line, a railway line in Osaka and Wakayama Prefectures between Osaka and Koyasan

=== Sierra Leone ===
- Kingdom of Koya, a pre-colonial African state in what is now northern Sierra Leone
- Koya, Sierra Leone, a village in Sierra Leone

== People and languages ==
- Koya (name), a given name and surname
- Koya (Malabar), a Muslim community in south India
- Gyele people, Cameroonian pygmies
- Kola people, Gabonese pygmies
- Koya language, a language spoken in India
- Koya (tribe), a scheduled tribe in India, speakers of the Koya language
- Koya, ring name of Indian professional wrestler Mahabali Shera
- Koyah (fl. 1787 – 1795), Haida chief in British Columbia

== Other uses ==
- KOYA, radio station in South Dakota, United States
- Koya score, a tiebreaker criterion for group tournaments
