= Kola Town =

Kola Town, Sierra Leone
- Location in Sierra Leone
- Coordinates: 8°20′N 13°04′W
- Country: Sierra Leone
- Region: Western Area
- District: Western Area Rural District

Government
- Time zone: UTC-5 (GMT)

Kola Town is a village in the Rural District in the Western Area of Sierra Leone. Kola Town is located around the highway From Freetown to Waterloo.

Due to its proximity to Freetown, Kola Town has a very diverse population. The major economic activities in Kola Town are fishing and trading. Like in many parts of Sierra Leone, the Krio language is the primary language of communication in Kola Town and is widely spoken in the village.
