= Kossoh Town =

- Location in Sierra Leone
- Coordinates: 8°20′N 13°04′W
- Country: Sierra Leone
- Region: Western Area
- District: Western Area Rural District

Government
  - Type: Village council
  - Village Head: Victor Haffner
- Time zone: UTC-5 (GMT)

Kossoh Town is a coastal village around the peninsular in the Western Area Rural District of Sierra Leone. The village lies about ten miles east of Freetown, and is in close proximity to the neighborhood village of Jui. Kossoh town seat around a large forest reserve. The major industry in the village is farming and coal mining.

Kossoh town is home to a large police academy training center of the Sierra Leone Police force. The inhabitants of Kosso Town are mostly from the Creole, Loko, Fula, Limba and Temne ethnic groups. The village is home to large Christian and Muslim population.

== History ==
Kosso Town was founded as a land for freed slaves from England. The Loko people are believed to have lived in what is now Kosso Town before the arrival of the freed slaves.
