= Tumbu =

Tumbu refers to:

- Junior Tumbu, nickname for Lamin Conteh (b. 1976), retired Sierra Leonean international footballer
- Tumbu, a cultivar of Karuka
- Tumbu fly (Cordylobia anthropophaga) a species of blow fly
- Tumbu liquor, another name for palm wine
- Tumbu, Sierra Leone, a settlement, see Tombo
- Tumbu John, a Software Engineer and IT Consultant.
