= Joe Town =

- Village
- Location in Sierra Leone
- Coordinates: 8°20′N 13°04′W
- Country: Sierra Leone
- Region: Western Area
- District: Western Area Rural District

Government
- Time zone: UTC-5 (GMT)

Joe Town is a village, near Newton, in the Western Area Rural District of Sierra Leone. Joe Town is about twenty five miles outside Freetown.

The main industry in Joe Town is farming. The village is inhabited by several ethnic groups, and the primary language of communication in Joe Town is the Krio language. The village is home to the St. Joseph Primary School at Joe Town and MedMed Games.
