= Grafton, Sierra Leone =

- Location in Sierra Leone
- Coordinates: 8°20′N 13°04′W
- Country: Sierra Leone
- Region: Western Area
- District: Western Area Rural District

Government
  - Type: Town council
  - Town Head: Charles Emmanuel Wallace
- Time zone: UTC-5 (GMT)

Grafton is a coastal town close to the peninsula, in the Western Area Rural District of Sierra Leone. Grafton is a trade center and lies about 20 miles (32 km) on the main highway to Freetown.

Grafton is a principal home of the Creole ethnic group, and the Creole people are by far the largest inhabitant of Grafton. The Krio language is the primary language of communication and the most widely spoken language in Grafton.

Although part of the larger Western Area Rural District Council, Grafton has its own locally directly elected Town Council, headed by a Town Head.
