= China-Sierra Leone Friendship Hospital =

Chinese funded hospital in Sierra Leone

Geography
- Location: Sierra Leone
- Coordinates: 8.3887°N 13.1430°W

Services
- Beds: 100

History
- Constructed: 2009

The China-Sierra Leone Friendship Hospital (Chinese: 塞拉利昂 - 中国友好醫院) is a modern hospital located in Jui, Sierra Leone, a town not far outside the capital of Freetown. It has 100 beds and is managed jointly by Sierra Leonean Ministry of Health and the Shandong Qushan Hospital, but is also 'twin hospitals' with Xiangya Hospital. It has departments for gynecology, surgery, ophthalmology, ear, nose, and throat, an ICU, and a mortuary. The hospital is built over an area of 7,738 square meters.

It also treated patients in the Western African Ebola virus epidemic.

== Construction and completion ==
The hospital was financed by the Chinese and Leoneans, and had support from UNICEF. It was built by a Chinese firm: the Anhui Construction Engineering Group. Construction for the project began in July 2009, and the hospital was completed in November 2012. When it was officially commissioned, Ernest Bai Koroma said,

We are indeed proud that for the first time we have a 100-bed hospital. For the first time, we have a hospital that we can carry out diagnostic tests and provide other services that could only be accessed in other countries.

== Visit and Communication ==
The hospital became the designated site for the Chinese Aid to Senegal Medical Team after its construction. In 2014, during the Ebola outbreak, the Chinese Medical Team, in collaboration with the local government, temporarily converted the hospital into an infectious disease facility. Following the end of the Ebola epidemic in November 2015, the Chinese Medical Team resumed responsibility for the hospital's daily diagnosis and treatment services.

The hospital also serves as a counterpart to Xiangya Hospital of Central South University's aid efforts to Africa. Xiangya Hospital regularly sends personnel for medical assistance and exchange visits. Additionally, Hunan Cancer Hospital has established a clinical research center within the China-Senegal Friendship Hospital, focusing on wound rehabilitation. Doctors from the China-Senegal Friendship Hospital also visit China to exchange medical expertise.

== See also ==
- China–Sierra Leone relations
- Medical diplomacy
