= Gloucester, Sierra Leone =

Gloucester, Sierra Leone Glɔsta
- Location in Sierra Leone
- Coordinates: 8°20′N 13°04′W
- Country: Sierra Leone
- Region: Western Area
- District: Western Area Rural District

Government
  - Type: Village Council
  - Village Head: William Kallon
- Time zone: UTC-5 (GMT)

Gloucester (Krio: Glɔsta) is a mountainous village in the Western Area Rural District of Sierra Leone. Gloucester lies approximately five miles east of Freetown, and close proximity to the towns of Regent and Leicester.

It is located in a valley above Freetown with streams flowing from higher up in the mountains providing irrigation. Much of the area is wooded, but it is possible to see the Bullom Shore to the north. Africanus Horton, born in Gloucester, described the area as presenting "the most picturesque and lovely scenery that ever eye beheld in a tropical world".

== History ==
Gloucester was founded by Governor Charles MacCarthy in 1814 as a settlement for liberated Africans, or recaptives, who had been freed for vessels involved in the slave trade by the West Africa Squadron. Henry Düring was a missionary active in the village between 1816–1823. He supervised the building of stone gothic-style church which was formally opened in 1820 with a service involving 400 recaptives.

== Population ==
The population of Gloucester is almost entirely from the Creole ethnic group. The Krio language is widely spoken in Gloucester.

== Prominent people from Gloucester ==
- Africanus Horton
