= Lakka, Sierra Leone =

Lakka
- Location in Sierra Leone
- Coordinates: 8°20′N 13°04′W
- Country: Sierra Leone
- Region: Western Area
- District: Western Area Rural District

Government
  - Type: Town council
  - Town Head: Michael Sylvanus Shyllon

Population (2010)
  - Total: 4,500±500
- Time zone: UTC-5 (GMT)

Lakka is a coastal resort town around the peninsular in the Western Area Rural District of Sierra Leone. The town lies about ten miles west of Freetown. The major industry in Lakka town is tourism and fishing. Lakka is known for its large beaches, which attract tourists to the town. Lakka has an estimated population of about 4,500, which is a small town by population, though large in land area.

== Demographics ==
Lakka town is ethnically diverse, as it is inhabited by several ethnic groups, though the Sherbro and Krio people are the principal inhabitants of the town. The inhabitants of Lakka are mainly fishermen. Lakka town is home to its own hospital, a number of hotels, as well as several primary schools and a secondary school. The inhabitant of Lakka are largely Christian.

== Politics ==
Although part of the Western Area Rural district council, Lakka has its own directly elected local town council headed by a Town Head. The current Town Head of Lakka is Peter, who was elected in the last election. Lakka district head municipal election.
