= Africanus Horton =

British Army officer, surgeon, writer and banker

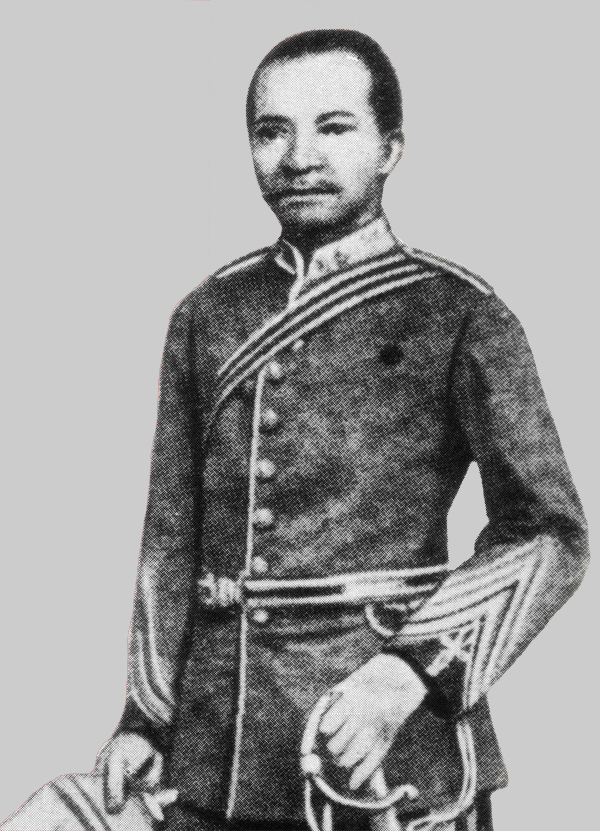
- Born: James Beale Horton c. 1835; Gloucester, Sierra Leone
- Died: c. 1883 (aged 47–48); Freetown, Sierra Leone
- Education: King's College London; University of Edinburgh
- Spouses: Fanny Marietta Pratt, Selina Beatrice Elliott (m. 1875)
- Military career
- Allegiance: United Kingdom
- Branch: British Army
- Service years: 1858–1880
- Rank: Surgeon-Major
- Units: West India Regiments; Army Medical Staff
- Conflicts: Anglo-Ashanti wars

Surgeon-Major James Africanus Beale Horton (c. 1835 – c. 1883) was a British Army officer, surgeon, writer and banker. Born in Gloucester, Sierra Leone into an Igbo family who were liberated from enslavement by the Royal Navy, he began attending the Sierra Leone Grammar School in 1845. After graduating from Fourah Bay College, Horton received a War Office scholarship study medicine in Britain to prepare him for a career in the British Armed Forces, and he attended King's College London and the University of Edinburgh. Serving in the West India Regiments, Horton was posted to various locations within the British Empire, including Lagos, the Gambia, Sierra Leone and the Gold Coast and participated in the Anglo-Ashanti wars.

Horton wrote extensively on the medicine and botany of West Africa, and espoused African nationalism and pan-Africanism in opposition to racism by European writers. In his works, including The Political Economy of British West Africa (1865) and West African Countries and Peoples (1868), he defended Africans against racist arguments and espoused self-governance for Britain's African colonies. After retiring from the army at the age of 45, Horton went to Freetown where he continued to campaign on political issues and opened a bank. His business activities and gold mining investments made him one of the wealthiest men in Africa by 1880, and Horton died three years later. A crater on Mercury is named in his honour.

== Early life ==
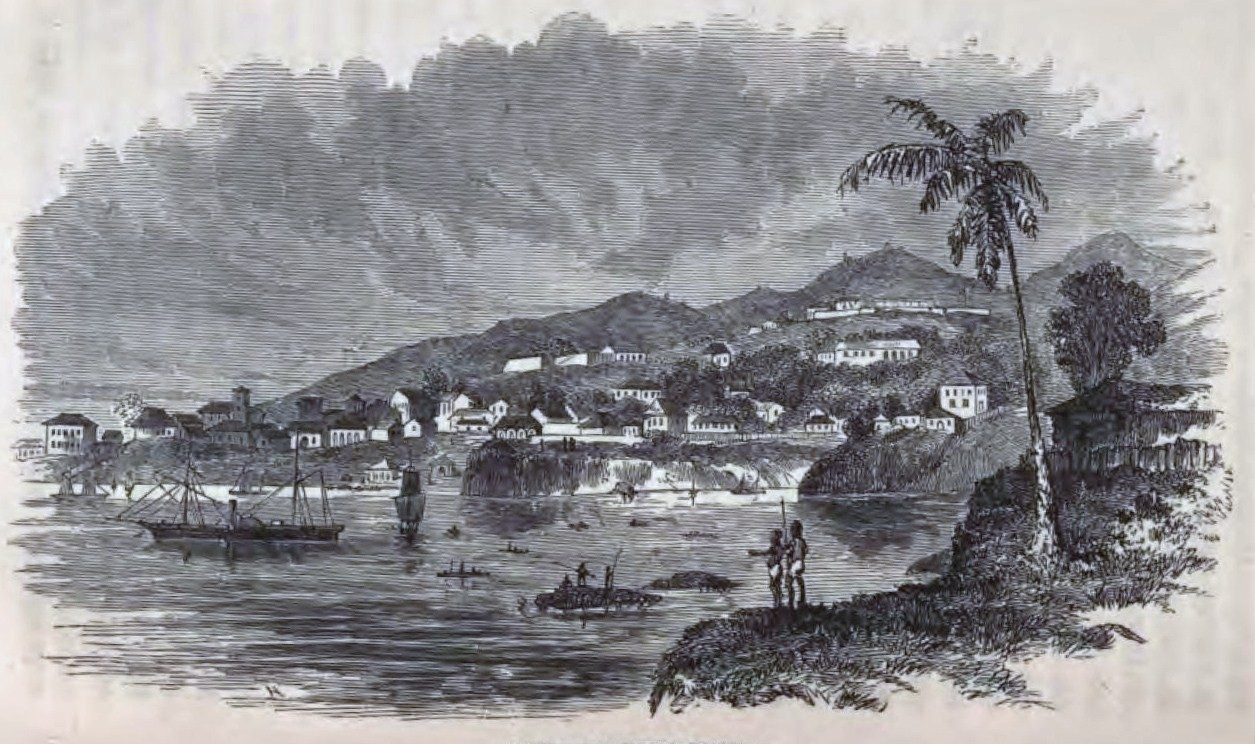
An illustration of Freetown in 1856

James Beale Horton was born c. 1835 in the village of Gloucester, Sierra Leone, near Freetown, the capital of the Sierra Leone Colony and Protectorate. His father was James Horton Sr., an Igbo man who had been sold into slavery as part of the Atlantic slave trade before being liberated by the Royal Navy's West Africa Squadron and landed ashore at Freetown. His mother was called Nancy was also of Igbo descent, both his parents being of Igbo origin. Horton began his education by studying at a local school in Gloucester before being recruited by British missionary The Rev. James Beale in 1845 to attend the Sierra Leone Grammar School, which was run by the Church Mission Society. After graduating from the school, he began studying divinity at the Fourah Bay College in the hopes of becoming a clergyman.

However, Horton eventually sought a military career instead. In 1855, alongside fellow Creoles William Davies and Samuel Campbell, he received a War Office scholarship to study medicine in Britain to prepare Horton for a career in the British Armed Forces, which at the time was looking for Black military personnel more acclimatised to African environments to serve in Africa. Horton studied at King's College London, and in 1858 published his dissertation, which was titled "On the medical topography of the west coast of Africa including sketches of its botany". He graduated in the same year.

While a student in Britain, Horton took on the name "Africanus" as a symbol of pride in his African heritage. After studying at King's College London, he went on to attend the University of Edinburgh, graduating with a Doctor of Medicine. He is considered to be the University's first African graduate. Upon the completion of his studies at Edinburgh, Horton was commissioned as an officer in the British Army at the rank of Staff-Assistant Surgeon, becoming one of the first Black people to serve in the officer corps of the British military. When he returned to Sierra Leone, Horton was posted to the neighbouring British colony of the Gold Coast, serving in the West India Regiments. As part of his military career, he was posted to various locations within the British Empire, including Lagos, the Gambia, Sierra Leone and the Gold Coast. Horton also participated in the Anglo-Ashanti wars.

== Politics and writings ==
Horton's first two publications: The Political Economy of British West Africa: with the Requirements of Several Colonies and Settlements (1865) and West African Countries and Peoples (1868) were a defense of Africans against racist views of some European anthropologists that Africans were a physically and intellectually inferior people whose development stopped centuries ago. He argued that all races have the faculty to acquire knowledge about philosophy, science and technologies that civilizations have developed over the ages. Horton was the first modern African political thinker to openly campaign for self-government for the West African colonies and champion the cause of what he referred to as "African nationality".

He was an advocate of an elected monarchy in which a king would be elected by universal suffrage and bicameral legislature. In regards to the economic development of Sierra Leone, he proposed the annexation and commercial development of surrounding land in an effort to raise the revenue necessary to implement various economic and social development plans. In another of his publications, a compilation of letters called Letters of the Political Condition of the Gold Coast since the exchange of territory, Horton wrote about hostilities between ethnic groups in the Gold Coast and offered his views about solving the hostilities including the continuation of education in Africa.

Horton was one of the first West Africans to demand the establishment of a medical school and higher institution in the region. Horton recognised the value in an indigenous institution and believed that it should be headed by an African, believing that they would be more invested in the progress of the country than a European. In 1861, he wrote a letter to the War Office in London, stating the need for a tropical medical school in the region. At the same time, Horton conducted his own medical science experiments in Africa, including an attempt to prove the presence of malaria in the miasmatic gasses of the Keta Lagoon. Horton is often seen as one of the founders of African nationalism and has been called "the father of modern African political thought".

== Later life and death ==
After his retirement from the army, Horton started a finance institution called the Commercial Bank of West Africa. Horton married on two occasions while living in Freetown; he first married Fanny Marietta Pratt, daughter of the prominent Pratt family of Igbo origin. Marietta died at age twenty-two and Horton then on May 29, 1875, went on to marry Selina Beatrice Elliott, daughter of John Bucknor Elliott who was the manager of the Western Area of Freetown. The Elliotts were a Nova Scotian Settler family of African-American descent. He died c. 1883. A crater on Mercury is named after him.

== Sources ==
- Adi, Hakim; Sherwood, Marika (March 28, 2003). Pan-African History: Political Figures from Africa and the Diaspora since 1787. Routledge. ISBN 978-0415173520.
- Adeloye, Adelola (1976). "Nigerian pioneer doctors and early West African politics". Nigeria Magazine. 121 (121): 2–24. PMID 11615014.
