= Cole Town =

Cole Town, Sierra Leone
- Location in Sierra Leone
- Coordinates: 8°20′N 13°04′W
- Country: Sierra Leone
- Region: Western Area
- District: Western Area Rural District
- Time zone: UTC-5 (GMT)

Cole Town is a village in the Rural District in the Western Area of Sierra Leone. mining and farming are the two major industries in Cole Town . Cole Town is located about ten miles to Waterloo and about twenty miles to Freetown.

The people of Cole Town are ethnically diverse, and the village is home to a religiously diverse population of Christians and Muslims. Like many parts of Sierra Leone, the Krio language is the main language of Cole Town and is widely spoken in the village.
