= Baw Baw, Sierra Leone =

- Location in Sierra Leone
- Coordinates: 8°20′N 13°04′W
- Country: Sierra Leone
- Region: Western Area
- District: Western Area Rural District

Government
  - Type: Village Council
  - Village Head: Gibrilla Kargbo
- Time zone: UTC-5 (GMT)

Baw Baw is a fishing village around the peninsular in the Western Area Rural District of Sierra Leone. The major industry in the village is fishing; and most of its residents are fishermen. The village lies close to the sea and the peninsular beach. Baw Baw village lies about ten miles west of Freetown.

The village of Baw Baw is largely inhabited by the Sherbro people.

== History ==
The village of Baw Baw was founded by a group of Sherbro fishermen before colonial era as a settlement for the Sherbro people, who are native to Sierra Leone. The word Baw Baw is literally translated as "if you can make it through" in the Sherbro language.
