= Charlotte, Sierra Leone =

Charlotte
- Location in Sierra Leone
- Coordinates: 8°20′N 13°04′W
- Country: Sierra Leone
- Region: Western Area
- District: Western Area Rural District

Government
  - Type: Village Council
  - Village Head: Catherine K. Harding
- Time zone: UTC-5 (GMT)

Charlotte is a mountainous village in the Rural District in the Western Area of Sierra Leone. Charlotte is located about twenty miles outside Freetown, Sierra Leone's capital. Charlotte, is commonly known as Charlotte Village, and is in close proximity to the towns of Regent, and Leicester. The main economic activity in Charlotte is farming.

The population of Charlotte are almost entirely from the Creole ethnic group. The people of Charlotte Village are mostly Christians, and the village is known for its deeply religious Christian faith. Charlotte Village is home to several Churches.

Charlotte Village has its own directly elected small village council local government, headed by a village Head; though it is part of the much larger Western Area Rural District Council. The current Village Head of Charlotte is Catherine K. Harding, who was elected in the 2013 Charlotte Village Head election.

Charlotte village is home to the Solomon Ekuma Berewa Primary School, named after former Sierra Leone's Vice President Solomon Berewa. The school was officially opened on November 10, 2006 by then Vice President Berewa. The Solomon Ekuma Berewa Primary School in Charlotte, has one of the highest academic scores among all primary schools in the National Primary School Examinations in Sierra Leone.

Charlotte Village does not have a secondary school or Junior secondary school. The students of Charlotte Village attend Secondary and Junior Secondary Schools in the neighboring towns of Regent and Leicester.

The area around Charlotte Village was subject to deforestation in 2010.

== History ==
Charlotte was founded in 1817 provide accommodation for recaptives, liberated enslaved Africans, who had been brought to Freetown by the British Royal Navy West Africa Squadron. It is named after Princess Charlotte of Wales.

Princess Charlotte was the only daughter of George, Prince of Wales (later King George IV) and she was in the news in 1817 because she died unexpectedly that year after childbirth (the baby was, sadly stillborn), aged just 21.

The Annie Walsh Memorial School, the oldest girls school Sub-Saharan Africa was originally located here. At inception it catered for eight pupils. The school, which was founded by the Church Missionary Society, moved to Kissy Road, Freetown in 1865.
