= Bathkump =

- Location in Sierra Leone
- Coordinates: 8°20′N 13°04′W
- Country: Sierra Leone
- Region: Western Area
- District: Western Area Rural District

Government
  - Type: Village Council
  - Village Head: Hassan J. Kamara
- Time zone: UTC-5 (GMT)

Bathkump is a village in the Rural District in the Western Area of Sierra Leone. Bathkump is located about twenty miles east of Freetown. The major economic activity in Bathkump is farming. Bathkump is within very close proximity to its neighboring village of Forgbo.

The large majority of the population of Bathkump are Muslims, and the Temne people make up the vast majority of the population in Bathkump. The Bondo Society is a prevalent traditional values in Bathkump.

Bathkump has its own directly elected village council local government, headed by a Village Head, though it is part of the much larger Western Area Rural District Council. The current Village Head of Bathkump is Hassan J. Kamara, who was elected Village Head of Bathkump in the 2013 Bathkump Village Head election, conducted by the Sierra Leone National Electoral Commission.

== History ==
The village of Bathkump was founded by a muslim cleric named Sulaiman Jabbie in the late nineteenth century. Sulaiman Jabbie was a Mandinka trader. Jabbie was an educated and wealthy Muslim merchant. Jabbie fought in battles in defending Bathkump from being invaded by outsiders and he establish complete autonomy in Bathkump. Jabbie establish a madrassa (an Islamic school) in Bathkump and many of the people of Bathkump were encouraged to accept Islam. Due to cleric Sulaiman Jabbie's influence, Muslims soon came to be a majority in the village. This has remained the case years after Sulaiman Jabbie's death.

The descendants of Sulaiman Jabbie are still very influential in Bathkump. The current Village Head of Bathkump Hassan J. Kamara is the grandson of Sulaiman Jabbie.
