= Benguema =

Benguema, Sierra Leone
- Location in Sierra Leone
- Coordinates: 8°20′N 13°04′W
- Country: Sierra Leone
- Region: Western Area
- District: Western Area Rural District

Government
  - Type: Town council
  - Town Head: Ekundayo Conteh

Population (2015)
  - Total: 30,268
- Time zone: UTC-5 (GMT)

Benguema is a military town in the Rural District in the Western Area of Sierra Leone, about 30 miles east of Freetown.

Benguema is home to the Benguema Military Academy, the largest Sierra Leone military recruit training center. The town is also home to Sierra Leone's largest military Barracks, that houses soldiers and family members of the Sierra Leone military. The population of Bengwema is ethnically diverse. The city of Benguema has an estimated population of 30,268.

Though part of the larger Western Area district council, Benguema is locally governed by a directly elected town council, headed by a Town Head. The current Town Head of Benguema is Ekundayo Conteh.

== Sources ==
http://travelingluck.com/Africa/Sierra%20Leone/Western%20Area/_2410144_Benguema.html
