= Adonkia, Sierra Leone =

- Location in Sierra Leone
- Coordinates: 8°20′N 13°04′W
- Country: Sierra Leone
- Region: Western Area
- District: Western Area Rural District

Government
  - Type: Village Council
  - Town Head: Hassan Sesay
- Time zone: UTC-5 (GMT)

Adonkia is a coastal town around the peninsular in the Western Area Rural District of Sierra Leone. Adonkia lies about 8.5 miles (13.6 kilometer) south-west of Freetown. The major industry in Adonkia is fishing, stone and coal mining.

Adonkia was founded as a land for the Sherbros in the early eighteenth century. The population of Adonkia is ethnically and religiously diverse among muslims and christians.

Although part of the larger Western Area district council, Adonkia has its own directly elected local town council, headed by a Town Head. The current Town Head of Adonkia is Hassan Sesay.

== History ==
Adonkia was founded by a Sherbro fisherman named Pa Donkeh in the early eighteenth century as a settlement for Sherbros. The word Adonkia is literally translated as where is this in the Sherbro language. In the mid eighteenth century a number of Ghanaians settled in the town. Adonkia was almost entirely all Christians before the early 19th century. In the early 19th century, Susu, Fula and Mandinka traders settled in Adonkia and introduced Islam to the local people; as a result today, Adonkia has a large population of both Muslims and Christians.
