= Newton, Sierra Leone =

- Location in Sierra Leone
- Coordinates: 8°20′N 13°04′W
- Country: Sierra Leone
- Region: Western Area
- District: Western Area Rural District

Government
  - Type: Town council
  - Town Head: Tommy Browne

Population (2015)
  - Total: 35,300
- Time zone: UTC+0 (GMT)

Newton is a city in the Rural District in the Western Area of Sierra Leone. The city lies approximately twenty miles east of Freetown. Newton had an estimated population of 35,300. Newton is the third most populous city in the Western Area, after Freetown and Waterloo. The city population is ethnically and religiously diverse. No single ethnic group form more than 25% of the population in Newton but there is a significant population of the Krio and Sherbro people, and a large population of both Muslims and Christians.

Newton is named after British abolitionist John Newton. Today there is a philanthropic link between John Newton's town of Olney in Buckinghamshire and Newton in the Western Area in Sierra Leone.

Though part of the larger Western Area Rural District Council Government, Newtown is locally governed by a directly elected town council, headed by a Town Head. The current Town Head of Newtown is Tommy Browne of the APC, who was elected in the 2013 Western Area Rural District Newton Town Head election.

The Anti Drugs Strikers football club which is based in Newton, represent the city in the Sierra Leone National Premier League. The club is overwhelmingly popular in Newton.

== Sources ==
- McClanahan, Paige (10 May 2011). "West Africa Rising: Leaders tout Sierra Leone's first value-added factory since the war". The Christian Science Monitor.
- Samba, Augustine (25 January 2010). "In Sierra Leone, Murder at Newton". Awareness Times.
