= China–Sierra Leone relations =

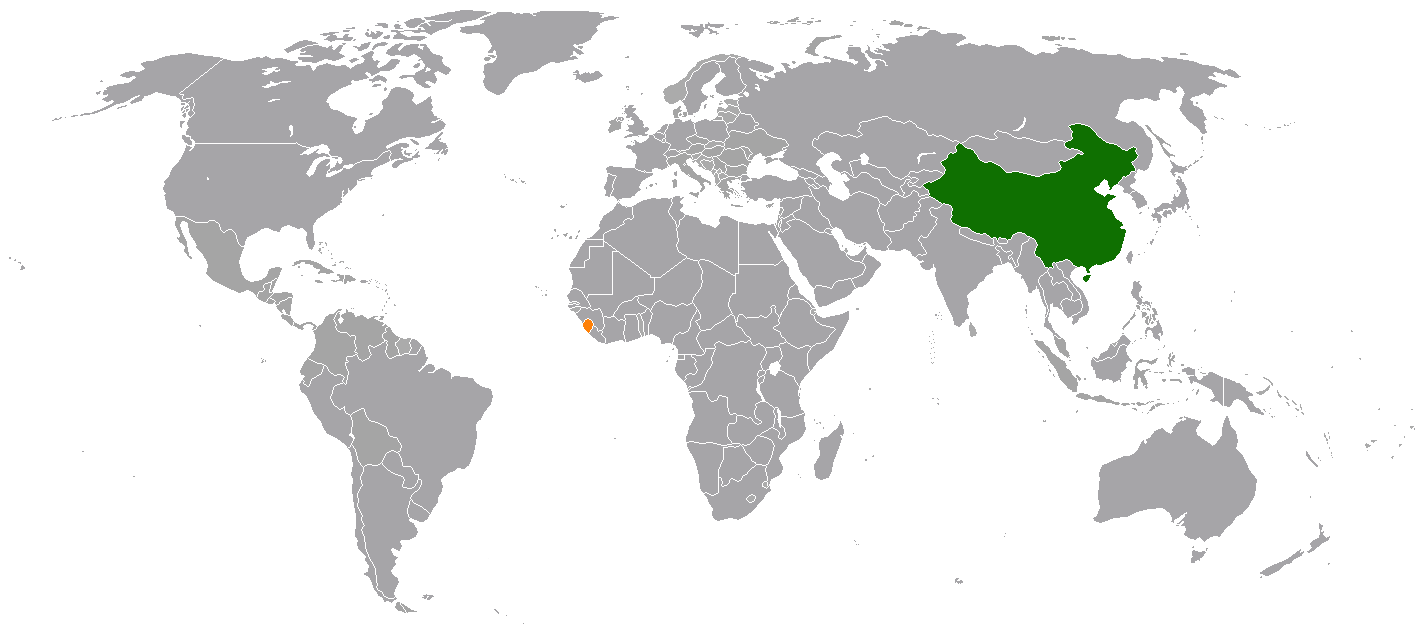
- China: Sierra Leone

China–Sierra Leone relations refer to the foreign relations between China and Sierra Leone. The People's Republic of China and the Republic of Sierra Leone established diplomatic relations on July 29, 1971. China has an embassy in Freetown, while Sierra Leone has an embassy in Beijing. The countries formed a strategic partnership in 2016.

== History ==
The People's Republic of China and the Republic of Sierra Leone established diplomatic relations on July 29, 1971.

In 2016, China and Sierra Leone formed a strategic partnership.

== Economic relations ==
Economic relations between Sierra Leone and China are mostly positive.

Sierra Leone joined the Belt and Road Initiative (BRI) in 2018.

=== Development assistance ===
From 2000 to 2011, there are approximately 37 Chinese official development finance projects identified in Sierra Leone through various media reports. These projects range from a $22 million debt relief, to assisting in highway repair projects and constructing Charlotte Hydropower Project, and a concessional loan of US$16.6 million to support Sierratel's CDMA project.

=== Medical assistance ===
A friendship hospital was funded by China in Sierra Leone, called the China-Sierra Leone Friendship Hospital.

During the Ebola outbreak in western Africa, Sierra Leone was one of the countries to which China's People's Liberation Army provided medical personnel.

On its 2017 medical mission to Africa, the People's Liberation Army Navy hospital ship Peace Ark traveled to Sierra Lerone.

== Cultural relations ==
University of Sierra Leone has a Confucius Institute.

== Sovereignty issues ==
Sierra Leone follows the one China principle. It recognizes the People's Republic of China as the sole government of China and Taiwan as an integral part of China's territory, and supports all efforts by the PRC to "achieve national reunification". It also considers Hong Kong, Xinjiang and Tibet to be China's internal affairs.

In June 2020, Sierra Leone was one of 53 countries that backed the Hong Kong national security law at the United Nations.
