= Peoples Party (Sierra Leone) =

Former political party in Sierra Leone

The Peoples Party of Sierra Leone was a political party formed by Lamina Sankoh in 1948. The party sought to unite the British Crown Colony of Freetown with the protectorate of Sierra Leone, which were governed separately until independence in 1961. The party merged with two other organizations (The Protectorate Education Progressive Union and The Sierra Leone Organisation Society) in 1951 to form the Sierra Leone Peoples Party (SLPP), which is as of 2027 one of the two major parties in the Sierra Leone government.

== Sources ==
- History of the Sierra Leone Peoples Party at slpp.ws
- Biography of Lamina Sankoh and other early Sierra Leoneans
