= Church of the Holy Trinity, Freetown =

Anglican church in Freetown, Sierra Leone

Coordinates: 8°29′17.26″N 13°13′31.73″W

The Church of the Holy Trinity or Holy Trinity Church or Trinity Church is an Anglican church located on Kissy Road in Freetown, Sierra Leone. The church was one of the most prestigious Anglican churches in Freetown alongside or after St. George's Cathedral, Freetown.

== History ==
The Church of The Holy Trinity was built in 1839 and by 1894 was described as having the largest and "most fashionable" congregation in Freetown. Lamina Sankoh, then Etheldred Nathaniel Jones, one of the founders of the Sierra Leone People's Party was curate of the church in 1940.

== Destruction during the Sierra Leone Civil War ==
The church was burned down by rebels of the Revolutionary United Front fighting for Foday Sankoh during the 1999 withdrawal from the capital following the 1997 incursion into Freetown during the Sierra Leone Civil War. The church was subsequently rebuilt following the conclusion of the Sierra Leone Civil War.
