= Bureh Town =

Saul Pon Bureh Town, Sierra Leone
- Location in Sierra Leone
- Coordinates: 8°20′N 13°04′W
- Country: Sierra Leone
- Region: Western Area
- District: Western Area Rural District

Government
  - Type: Town Council
  - Town Head: Micheal Tucker
- Time zone: UTC-0 (GMT)

Bureh Town is a small resort town in the Rural District in the Western Area of Sierra Leone. Bureh Town is located around the Sierra Leone peninsular; and is home to the Bureh Beach, one of the main tourists attracting centers in Sierra Leone . Bureh Town is home to the Bureh Beach surf club, the only surf club center in Sierra Leone. . The town is named after Bai Bureh, a Sierra Leonean pro independent leader, who lead the Hut Tax War of 1898 in Northern Sierra Leone against the British administration of Sierra Leone.

The main economic activities in Bureh Town is tourism, fishing and trading. Bureh Town is home to several different ethnic groups, although the Sherbro are the largest ethnic group in the town, followed by the Temne people. Bureh Town was founded by the Sherbro people, and the town still has a large significant Sherbro population at present. Bureh Town is home to a large population of Christians and Muslims. Like the rest of Sierra Leone, the two main religions peacefully interact and get along very well in Bureh Town. Like many parts of Sierra Leone, the Krio language is the main language widely spoken in Bureh Town.

Although part of the larger Western Area Rural District Government, Bureh Town has its own small town-council local government, headed by a Town Head. The current Town Head of Bureh Town is Michael Tucker, who was elected in the 2013 Bureh Town local election
