= Koya, Sierra Leone =

- Location in Sierra Leone
- Coordinates: 8°20′N 13°04′W
- Country: Sierra Leone
- Region: Western Area
- District: Western Area Rural District

Government
- Time zone: UTC-5 (GMT)

Koya is a village in the Rural District in Western Area of Sierra Leone and lies about 43 km (27 mi) from Freetown.
