= Stones Town =

Stones Town, Sierra Leone
- Location in Sierra Leone
- Coordinates: 8°20′N 13°04′W
- Country: Sierra Leone
- Region: Western Area
- District: Western Area Rural District
- Time zone: UTC-5 (GMT)

Stones Town is a village in the Rural District in the Western Area of Sierra Leone. Stones Town is about seventeen miles east of Freetown. The main economic activities in Stones Towns are farming and fishing.

Virtually all of the people of Stones Town village are members of the Krio ethnic group, and the Krio language is widely spoken in the village. The Krio culture and tradition, which are primarily based on Western Tradition, are prevalent in Stones Town. The people of Stones Town are overwhelmingly Christian majority of the Anglican church.
