= John Ulrich Graf =

John Ulrich Graf (1811 in Grub – 24 September 24, 1887) was a German missionary for the Church Missionary Society (CMS) who was active in Sierra Leone from 1837 to 1855. He was involved in the relocation of Yoruba recaptives to their homeland where the CMS was to set up missions at Abeokuta and Ibadan.

Graf first trained at the Basel Mission before coming to England. He was ordained as a deacon by James Henry Monk, the Bishop of Gloucester on 5 June 1836. In 1837 he went Islington to finish his training at the Church Missionary College. He then returned to Sierra Leone, where he took over Saint Thomas Church, Hastings from John Fredrick Schön, whose wife had recently died.

By 1855 Graf was suffering from ill health and returned to Britain. He died in 1887.
