= Lamina Sankoh =

Sierra Leonean politician and banker (1884 – 1964)

Lamina Sankoh J.D.

Personal details
- Born: Ethelred Nathaniel Jones; 28 June 1884 Gloucester, British Sierra Leone
- Died: 1964 (aged 79–80) Freetown, Sierra Leone
- Resting place: Freetown, Sierra Leone
- Party: Sierra Leone People's Party (SLPP)
- Education: Fourah Bay College, Freetown, British Sierra Leone; University of Oxford, Oxford, England
- Profession: Philosopher, priest, university professor

Lamina Sankoh (28 June 1884 – 1964), born Etheldred Nathaniel Jones, was a Sierra Leone Creole pre-independence politician, educator, banker and cleric. Sankoh is known most prominently for helping to found the Peoples Party in 1948, one of the first political parties in Sierra Leone. It eventually became the Sierra Leone People's Party.

== Early life ==
Lamina Sankoh was born as Etheldred Nathaniel Jones in Gloucester, British Sierra Leone, in the Mountain District in the city of Freetown on 28 June 1884 to ethnic Creole parents. He attended a village school in Gloucester, The Cathedral School, Albert Academy and CMS Grammar School. He eventually graduated from Fourah Bay College, where he received his Bachelor of Arts degree. He then went to study theology and philosophy at Wycliffe Hall, University of Oxford, in the United Kingdom, matriculating in 1921. From the 1920s he changed his name to Lamina Sankoh.

== Professional career ==
Sankoh returned to Gloucester in 1924 and received a position as priest and was appointed curate of Holy Trinity Church. He preached for progressive thinking within the church, because of which he also left the post in 1927. While a curate, Sankoh also lectured at Fourah Bay. After leaving the church, Sankoh travelled to the U.K. in order to study education at Oxford. A year later, he travelled to the United States, where he taught at various historically black colleges, including Tuskegee University in Tuskegee, Alabama, Lincoln University in Chester County, Pennsylvania and South Carolina State University in Orangeburg, South Carolina.

=== Back to Britain ===
In 1930, Sankoh left the U.S. to go back to Britain, where he became actively involved with the West African Students' Union (WASU), a London-based activist organization campaigning for self-government of their colonies in Africa. He eventually became the editor of WASU's journal, as well as a regular contributor.

=== Back to Sierra Leone ===
In the 1940s, Sankoh returned to Sierra Leone. He became closely involved in municipal and local affairs, including the restructuring of city government in Freetown. He became a city councillor in 1948. He also resumed teaching at Fourah Bay, this time adult education. At one point, Sankoh was the president of the Freetown adult education society. He established a "penny-savings" bank, as well as a newspaper called The African Vanguard. He also established an independent church for Sierra Leoneans that was "relatively free of western influence". Sankoh fought hard for the unification of Sierra Leone into one nation. He founded the "People's Forum" and the "Peoples Party" in 1948, which eventually became the party known today as the Sierra Leone People's Party (SLPP).

Sankoh died in 1964. A prominent street in downtown Freetown was named after him.

== Sources ==
- "Heroes of Sierra Leone", 1984, Sierra-Leone.org.
