= Bathurst, Sierra Leone =

Bathurst
- Location in Sierra Leone
- Coordinates: 8°20′N 13°04′W
- Country: Sierra Leone
- Region: Western Area
- District: Western Area Rural District

Government
  - Type: Village council
  - Village Head: Samuel JS Woodie
- Time zone: UTC-5 (GMT)

Bathurst is a mountainous village in the Western Area Rural District of Sierra Leone. Bathurst seats at 541 feet above sea level, and lies approximately six miles west of Freetown.

The major industry in Bathurst village is farming, small scale coal mining and animal husbandry. The Creole people are the largest and principal inhabitants of Bathurst village.

== History ==
Bathurst was founded in 1817 provide accommodation for recaptives, liberated enslaved Africans, who had been brought to Freetown by the British Royal Navy West Africa Squadron. It was originally called Leopold, in honour of Leopold I of Belgium, who was at the time husband to Princess Charlotte of Wales. Charlotte was established at the same time nearby, named after his wife.
