= Jui, Sierra Leone =

Town in Sierra Leone

Coordinates: 8°25′N 13°08′W

Jui is a town in the Rural District in the Western Area of Sierra Leone Jui is located just outside the east end of Sierra Leone's capital Freetown city limit. Jui is home to a very religiously and ethnically diverse population.

Jui is home to the China-Sierra Leone Friendship Hospital, one of the largest hospitals in Sierra Leone. Jui is also home to the Evangelical College of Theology·
