= Anti Drugs Strikers =

- Full name: Anti Drugs Strikers FC
- Founded: 1993
- Ground: EBK Stadium; Newton, Sierra Leone, Sierra Leone
- Capacity: 1,000
- Chairman: Alhaji Jalloh
- Manager: Abubakar Sesay
- League: Sierra Leone National Premier League

Anti Drugs Strikers FC is a Sierra Leonean professional football club based in Newton, Sierra Leone. They play in the Sierra Leone National Premier League, the top football league in Sierra Leone.

The club was founded in 1993.

== Stadium ==
Anti Drugs Strikers represents Newton, Sierra Leone, and play their home games at the 1000 capacity EBK Stadium.
