= Kent, Sierra Leone =

Kent
- Location in Sierra Leone
- Coordinates: 8°20′N 13°04′W
- Country: Sierra Leone
- Region: Western Area
- District: Western Area Rural District

Government
  - Type: Village Council
  - Village Head: Samuel Massah

Population (2013)
  - Total: 1,804
- Time zone: UTC-5 (GMT)

Kent is a coastal fishing village around the peninsular in the Western Area Rural District of Sierra Leone. Kent lies approximately thirty miles east of Freetown. Kent is known for its large beaches and its strong fishing community.

The population of Kent is estimated at 1,804 residents, and is ethnically diverse. The major industry in Kent is fishing, coal mining and tourism.

== History ==
During the 17th and 18th centuries Kent was a centre for the slave trade; people were captured by the Portuguese, and then shipped from Kent to the Banana Islands, where they were inspected; many were later sent by ship to the Americas. During this time, the village contained several slave pens, each of which could hold up to 500 slaves.

Kent retained a connection with the slave trade following the abolition of slavery by the British. The British West Africa Squadron patrolled the area with boats to prevent illegal slaving. Kent then became a centre for hundreds of freed African American and Afro-Caribbean slaves arriving from Nova Scotia, England and the United States. The descendants of the settlers are the Creole people.

The village was officially founded and named at this time, by Nova Scotian Peter During, and Lieutenant-Colonel Charles McCarthy. The slave pens were converted to churches by Anglican missionaries.

== Economy ==
Kent has been an important centre for palm nut agriculture since the 19th century, and palm wine and oil are still important components of the local economy. Fishing is also important, as is tourism. Visitors come for the beach, as well as to travel on the ferry to nearby Banana Islands.
