= Kerry Town =

Kerry Town, Sierra Leone
- Location in Sierra Leone
- Coordinates: 8°20′N 13°04′W
- Country: Sierra Leone
- Region: Western Area
- District: Western Area Rural District
- Time zone: UTC-5 (GMT)

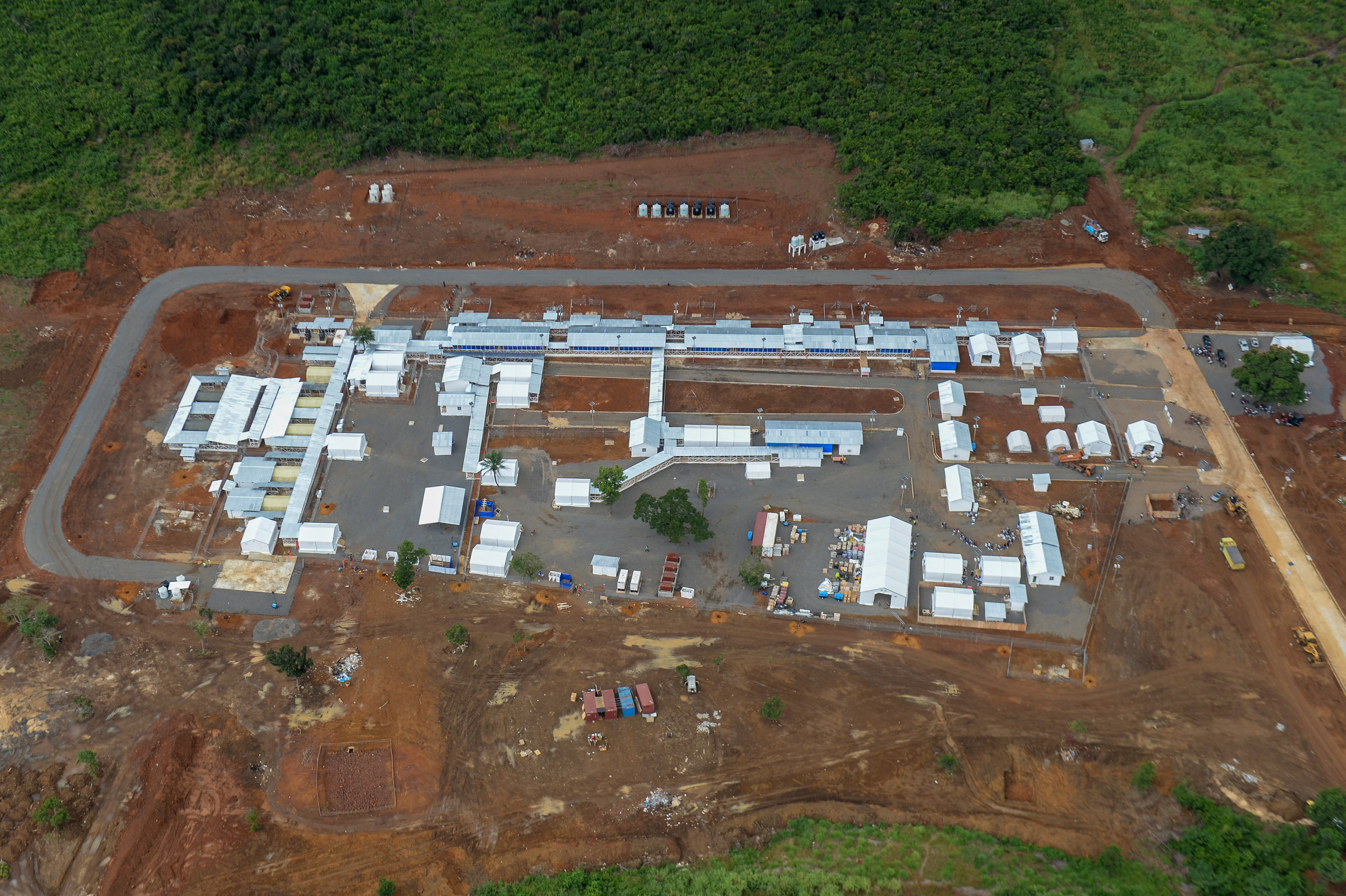
British Ebola treatment centre in November 2014

Kerry Town is a village in the Rural District in the Western Area of Sierra Leone. the town is located about 31 kilometres (19 mi) from the national capital, Freetown, which lies to the west-north-west. The population of Kerry Town is largely from the Krio ethnic group. The Treatment of the Ebola Virus clinic is located in Kerry Town.

== Ebola treatment centre ==
Kerry Town is home to a centre for the treatment of Ebola virus disease. The facility was opened in November 2014 during the Ebola virus epidemic in Sierra Leone.

In early November 2014 the Ebola clinic in Kerry Town was completed after eight weeks of construction by the Ministry of Defence and handed over to the charity Save the Children. The clinic was the first of six planned clinics in the West Africa region. The clinic consisted of an 80-bed treatment centre with a 12-bed treatment centre for healthcare workers. The centre is staffed by Cuban and Sierra Leonean medics and international aid workers from Save the Children while the healthcare section are manned by British Army medics.

On 29 December 2014, Pauline Cafferkey, a British aid worker who had just returned to Glasgow from working at the treatment centre in Kerry Town, was diagnosed with Ebola at Glasgow's Gartnavel General Hospital.
