= Liberated Africans in Sierra Leone =

Illegally enslaved Africans rescued from Atlantic slave ships

The liberated Africans of Sierra Leone, also known as recaptives, were Africans who had been illegally enslaved onboard slave ships and rescued by anti-slavery patrols from the West Africa Squadron of the Royal Navy. After the British Parliament passed the Slave Trade Act 1807, which abolished Britain's involvement in the slave trade, the Admiralty established the West Africa Squadron to suppress the trade in cooperation with other Western powers. All illegally enslaved Africans liberated by the Royal Navy were taken to Freetown, where Admiralty courts legally confirmed their free status. Some Liberated Africans were consigned to a variety of unfree labor apprenticeships in Sierra Leone. During the 19th century, it has been estimated by historians that roughly 80,000 illegally enslaved Africans were liberated by the Royal Navy.

== Background ==
Shortly after the British Parliament outlawed British participation in the slave trade in 1807, the Royal Navy started to patrol the African coast and high seas, seizing British vessels suspected of engaging in the slave trade. After the Congress of Vienna and the ratification of various international agreements to restrict or outlaw the transatlantic trade, the West Africa Squadron, and to a lesser extent maritime patrols flying under the flags of Spain, Portugal, the Netherlands, Brazil, and the United States, also intercepted ships suspected of trafficking slaves in contravention of treaty provisions. In addition to the courts established in Freetown, tribunals to judge ships seized by anti-slaving patrols also operated in Havana, Rio de Janeiro, Luanda, Cape Verde, and St. Helena.

More than 80,000 Africans rescued from the illegal trade between Africa and the Americas were emancipated before courts operating in Freetown between 1808 and 1871, when the last remaining mixed commission was shuttered. Upon emancipation, most liberated Africans were registered with a Christian name, but a large number of registries also listed African names, based on information given by the liberated African or a translator. Many registries also record estimated age, height, brands, and body modifications.

The liberated Africans came from all over West Africa and some Central African countries. A significant portion of the recaptives settled in Freetown were Akan, Yoruba, Igbo and Hausa.

== Life in Sierra Leone ==
Though historians have noted that information on the day-to-day lives of the liberated Africans living in Sierra Leone is scarce, registers of Africans liberated by the British, letters written to the governor of Sierra Leone and other sources have allowed modern historians to reconstruct the daily lives of liberated Africans. In the registers kept by the British, many of the African names were changed to European ones, highlighting the transition to their new circumstances in a British colony. The liberated Africans were temporarily consigned by the colonial government to a variety of unfree labor apprenticeships in Freetown and the interior as part of their transition to being free subjects.

== Liberated African villages ==
A number of villages were established to provide accommodation for these new residents of Sierra Leone.

- 1809 Leicester
- 1810 Wilberforce, formerly Cabenda
- 1812 Regent
- 1814 Gloucester
- 1816 Kissy
- 1817 Bathurst, formerly Leopold
- 1817 Charlotte
- 1819 Hastings
- 1819 Waterloo
- 1819 Wellington
- 1829 Murray Town
- 1829 Aberdeen

== Formation of Sierra Leone Creole people ==
The Colony-born children of Liberated Africans, the Jamaican Maroons and Nova Scotian Settlers sometimes called the liberated Africans "Willyfoss niggers". Nevertheless, after several decades all three groups developed into the Sierra Leone Creole people who became recognised as a particular ethnic identity alongside others in Sierra Leone.

== See also ==
- Saros (Nigeria)
- Sierra Leone Creole people
- Creolization
- Abolitionism in the United Kingdom
- African diaspora

== Sources ==
- Johnson U. J. Asiegbu, Slavery and the Politics of Liberation, 1787-1861: A Study of Liberated African Emigration and British Anti-Slavery Policy. Harlow: Longmans, 1969.
- Growing In Faith – The United Reformed Church
- A Voyage Round the World, Vol. I
- http://www.yorku.ca/nhp/seminars/seminars/schuler.doc
- https://web.archive.org/web/20070709215922/http://www.ehess.fr/centres/ceifr/assr/N117/03.pdf (no longer available)
- "History of Creoles of Freetown", AfricaMedia
