= Leicester, Sierra Leone =

Leicester, Sierra Leone Lɛsta
- Location in Sierra Leone
- Coordinates: 8°27′N 13°13′W
- Country: Sierra Leone
- Region: Western Area
- District: Western Area Rural District

Population (2015)
  - Total: 18,678
- Time zone: UTC-5 (GMT)

Leicester (Krio: Lɛsta) is a coastal town in the Western Area Rural District of Sierra Leone. The town lies approximately fifteen miles east of Freetown. The town has an estimated population of 18,678. Leicester is largely populated by the Krio people. The Krio language is the primary language of communication in the town.

== History ==
Leicester was founded in 1809 to provide accommodation for liberated enslaved Africans, who had been brought to Freetown by the British Royal Navy West Africa Squadron. It was probably named by Thomas Ludlam, who ended his third term as Governor of Sierra Leone on 27 July 1808, and was born in Leicester, England.

A hospital was founded here, and John Macaulay Wilson, one of the first Africans to be given European medical training worked here as an Assistant Colonial Surgeon.

== Notable people ==
- Dr. Oloh, musician
