= York, Sierra Leone =

- Location in Sierra Leone
- Coordinates: 8°20′N 13°04′W
- Country: Sierra Leone
- Region: Western Area
- District: Western Area Rural District

Government
  - Type: Village council
  - Town Head: Peter K Atsakpo
- Time zone: UTC-5 (GMT)

York is a small coastal fishing town in the Peninsula, located in the Western Area Rural District of Sierra Leone. It lies about 25 miles outside Freetown.

The principal inhabitants of York are the Creole people, who make up the vast majority of the population of York. The major industry in York is fishing. The vast majority of the people of York are Christians; and the town is known for its deep Christian Heritage.

Although part of the larger Western Area Rural District Council, York has its own directly elected Town Council, headed by a Town Head. The current Town Head of York is Julric Pratt.
