= Regent, Sierra Leone =

Regent
- Location in Sierra Leone
- Coordinates: 8°26′3″N 13°13′23″W
- Country: Sierra Leone
- Area: Western Area
- District: Western Area Rural District

Government
  - Type: Town Council
  - Town Head: Reverend Elinorah Jokomi Metzger
- Time zone: UTC-5 (GMT)

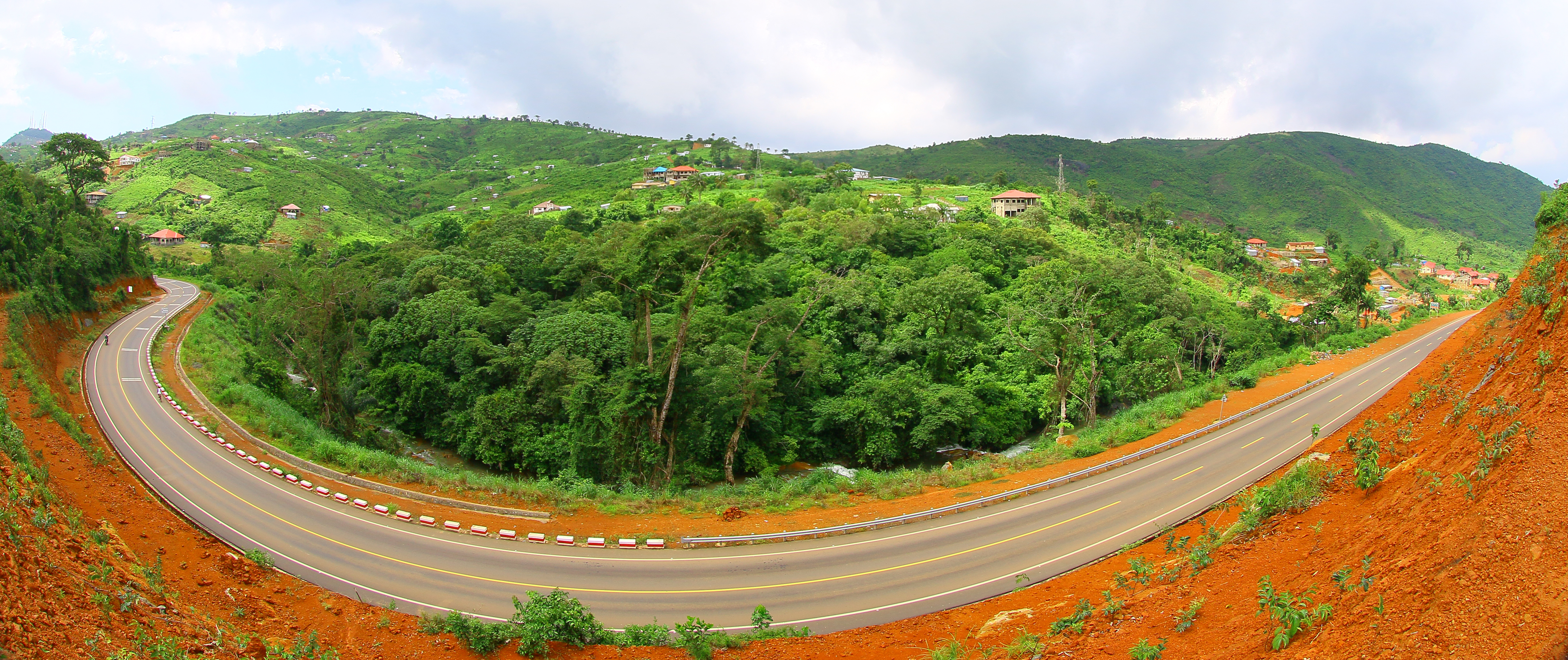
New road in Regent (2015)

Regent is a mountainous town in the Western Area Rural District of Sierra Leone. Regent lies approximately six miles east of Freetown, and close to the village of Gloucester.

The population of Regent is approximately 22,000 people and the community is religiously very diverse.

Regent is the hometown of Sierra Leonean economist and politician, Solomon Athanasius James Pratt.

== History ==
Regent was founded in 1812 to provide accommodation for Liberated Africans, who had been brought to Freetown by the British Royal Navy West Africa Squadron. The descendants of these liberated Africans, (along with the Jamaican Maroons and Nova Scotians) are the Creole people. Originally called Hogbrook, Regent was named in honour of the George IV of the United Kingdom, at the time Prince Regent of England.

=== St Charles Church ===
The St Charles’ Church was built in 1816 as part of the Parish Plan. This stone church was financed by the colonial government, and from 1817 the Church Missionary Society paid for a minister, a position taken up by Rev. William A. B. Johnson, nicknamed the “Apostle of Regent”. He was so successful in his evangelism that soon his congregation exceeded the 500 person capacity of the church, and a gallery was added so that another 200 worshippers could be catered for. However after Johnson's death in 1823, the size of the congregation became much smaller.

=== 2017 mudslide ===
On the morning of August 14, 2017, a large landslide killed at least 500 people after a night of heavy rains, with the death toll expected to rise. The flooding occurred in the Regent Hill area of Mount Sugar Loaf, killing an estimated 500 people (some died by the landslide immediately in the middle of the night), but hundreds of others are still missing. The suburb is at the brink of the Atlantic Ocean; thus, bodies floated in the shallows and drifted north towards neighboring Conakry, Guinea.
