= Tombo, Sierra Leone =

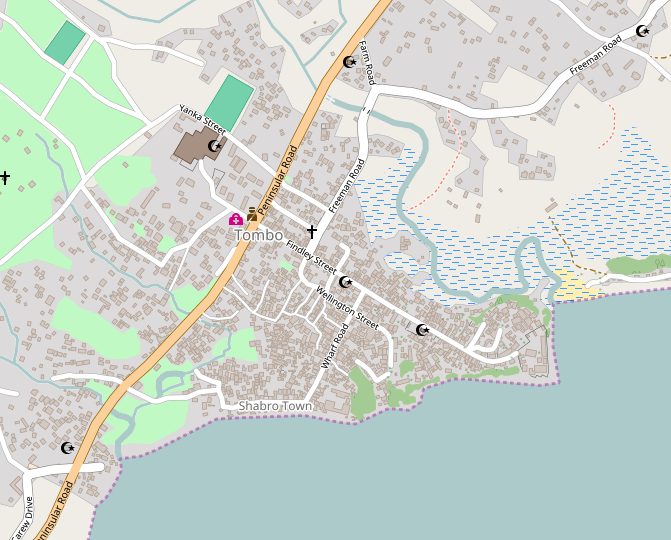
- Coordinates: 8°12′59.32″N 13°05′42.97″W
- Country: Sierra Leone
- Region: Western Area
- District: Western Area Rural District

Government
  - Type: Town council
  - Town Head: Sarah Bah
- Time zone: UTC-5 (GMT)

Tombo (Tumbu) is a coastal fishing town located on the southern coast of the Western Area Rural District of Sierra Leone. The town is approximately 30 miles (49 km) south east of Freetown. The major industry in Tombo is fishing. Other industries in the town include coal mining and farming. Tombo is a major trade and transport hub for fishing boats.

Tombo is a cosmopolitan settlement and is inhabited by several ethnic groups, including the Temne, Sherbro and Limba ethnic groups. The population of Tomba is predominantly Muslim. The town is known for its deeply religious Islamic faith. The town has its own local radio station known as Radio Tombo on MHz 96.1. Tombo is home to the Tombo hospital, that serves the town and its surrounding area

Although part of the larger Western Area district council, Tombo is locally governed by a directly elected town council, headed by a Town Head. In 2013 Mohamed D Mansaray. In 2019 Sarah Bah was elected Town Head.

== History ==
The town was founded by the Sherbro people in the early sixteenth century, years before the colonial era. It is believed that the name "Tombo" is originated from the Sherbro word "thomboc". During the seventeenth and eighteenth centuries, the settlement of Tombo was controlled by the Caulkers, a British slave trade family. During the colonial era, Tombo was almost entirely Sherbro. Many of the Sherbros in the town during the colonial era took the British last name "Caulker".

From colonial days to the present, many descendants of the Sherbro slave trade in Tombo still carry the last name "Caulker". During the late colonial era, some Temne and Limba from Freetown moved to Tombo as traders and fishermen.

Tombo is also known for its football academy built in 2008 by the Craig Bellamy Foundation, where girls and boys receive an international standard education and elite-level football coaching for free.
