= Western Area Rural District =

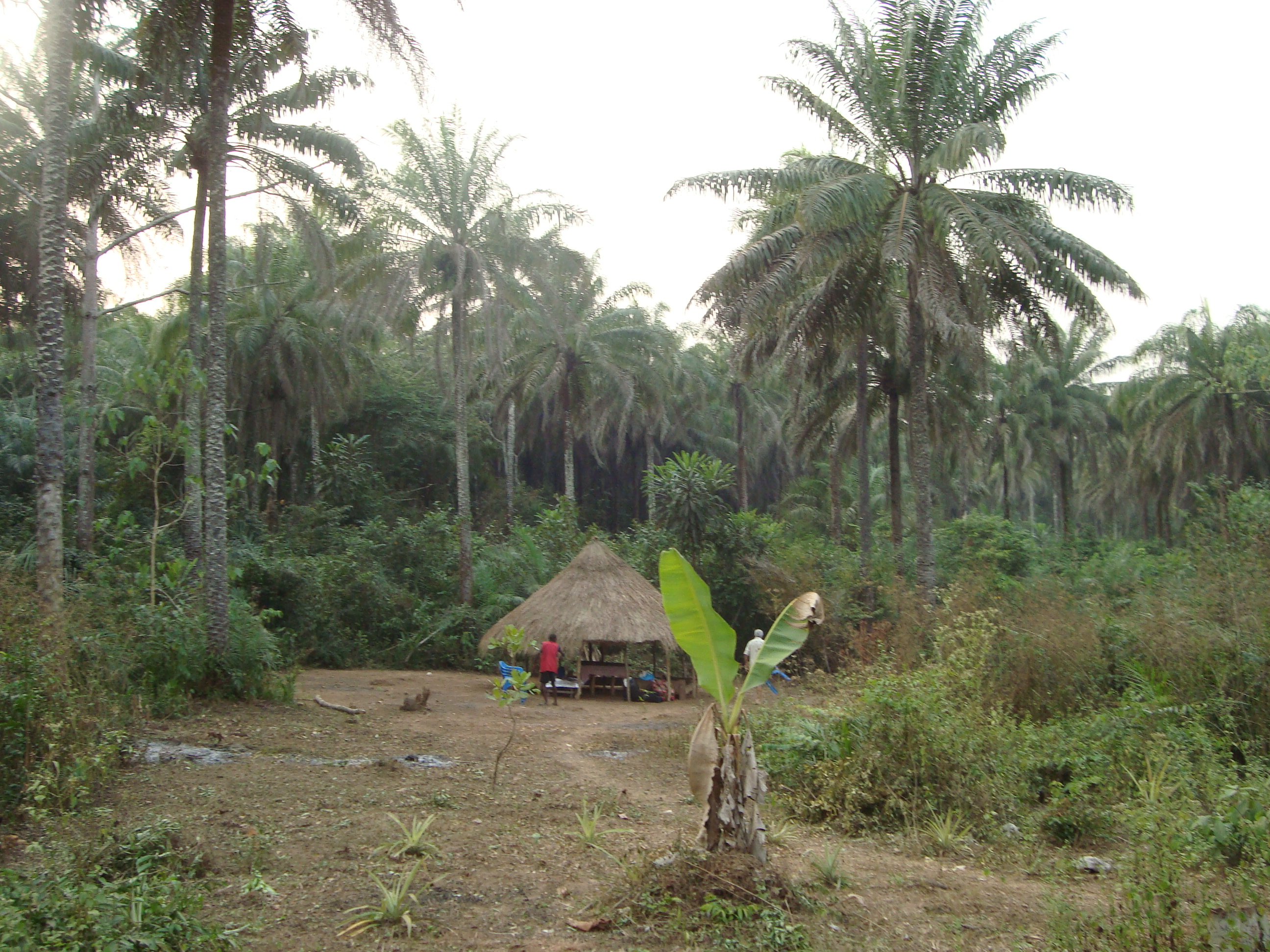
- Cottage in the Western Area Rural District, near the Port Loko River

- Location of Western Area Rural District in Sierra Leone
- Coordinates: 8°20′N 13°4′W
- Country: Sierra Leone
- Province: Western Area
- Capital: Waterloo
- Largest city: Waterloo

Government
  - Type: District Council
  - Council Chairman: Joseph Holland Cole (APC)

Area
  - Total: 1,228 km^{2} (474 sq mi)

Population (2015 census)
  - Total: 442,951
  - Density: 360.7/km^{2} (934.2/sq mi)
- Time zone: UTC+0 (Greenwich Mean Time)
- HDI (2017): 0.475 low · 2nd

The Western Area Rural District is one of the sixteen districts of Sierra Leone. It is located mostly around the peninsula in the Western Area of Sierra Leone. The Western Area Rural District has a 2015 census population of 442,951. The district capital and largest city is Waterloo. Other major towns in the district include Newton, Benguema, Leicester, Tombo and Regent. Most of the towns and villages in the Western Area Rural District are close to the capital Freetown and are part of the Freetown Metropolitan Area.

The Western Area Rural District is bordered by the country's capital Freetown to the east and west; Port Loko District to the north; and the Atlantic Ocean to the south and east.

In October 2009, the Sierra Leone government officially moved the Rural District capital from Freetown to the city of Waterloo, after the completion of the newly built government complex for the rural district council. This provides more regional focus.

The Western Area Rural District is one of the most ethnically diverse districts in Sierra Leone. No single ethnic group form more than 25% of the population in the district. The district has a significant population of the Krio and Sherbro people. The Western Area Rural District is the only district in Sierra Leone that is home to an ethnic Krio majority town or village, as several villages and a couple of small towns have Krio majority population in the District. There are large proportions of both Muslims and Christians in the district.

Like the other fifteen districts of Sierra Leone, the Western Area Rural District has its own directly elected district government, known as a district council, headed by a directly elected district council chairman. This person leads the district council executive branch and enforces laws passed by members of the district council. The current district council chairman is Joseph Holland Cole of the All People's Congress (APC). He was elected with 53% of the votes in the 2018 Western Area Rural District council election.

The Western Area Rural District is traditionally a swing district, with about equal support for both of the two main political parties in Sierra Leone, the Sierra Leone People's Party (SLPP) and the All People's Congress (APC). However, in recent elections from 2007 to the most recent election in 2018, the Western Area Rural District voted by majority for the All People's Congress in presidential, parliamentary and local elections. In the 2018 Sierra Leone Presidential election, Samura Kamara of the APC won 59% of the votes in Western Area Rural District, while Julius Maada Bio of the SLPP received 40% of the votes in the Western Area Rural District.

== Administrative divisions ==
=== Chiefdoms ===
After the 2017 local administrative reorganization, Western Area Rural District has made up of four chiefdoms as the third level of administrative subdivision.

1. Koya Rural
2. Mountain Rural
3. Waterloo Rural
4. York Rural

=== Largest cities and towns ===
- Waterloo, largest city
- Newton, second largest city
- Benguema
- Tombo
- Leicester

=== Small towns and villages ===
- Leicester
- Regent
- Bureh Town
- Jui
- Grafton
- York
- Adonkia
- Lakka
- Tokeh
- Kwama
- Samuel Town
- Kola Town
- Joe Town
- Charlotte
- Sussex
- Bathurst
- Baw Baw
- Dublin
- Ricketts
- Fogbo
- Gloucester
- Kent
- Kerry Town
- Kebbie Town
- Tissana
- Bathkump
- Kossoh Town
- Cole Town
- Rokel
- Rokupa
- Russell
- Stones Town

== Religion ==
Religion in Western Area Rural District (2015)
Religion	Percent(%)
Islam	72.0%
Christianity	27.3%
Baháʼí	0.1%
African Traditional Religion	0.0%
Other	0.6%
No religion	0.1%
