= Western Area =

Subdivision of Sierra Leone

- Nickname: Freetown Peninsula
- Coordinates: 8°20′N 13°00′W
- Country: Sierra Leone
- Capital: Freetown

Area
  - Total: 696 km^{2} (269 sq mi)

Population (2021 national census)
  - Total: 1,271,330
  - Density: 1,830/km^{2} (4,730/sq mi)
- Time zone: UTC0 (Greenwich Mean Time)

The Western Area or Freetown Peninsula (formerly the Colony of Sierra Leone) is one of five principal divisions of Sierra Leone. It comprises the oldest city and national capital Freetown and its surrounding towns and countryside. It covers an area of 696 square kilometres (269 sq mi) and has a population of 1,271,330 in 2021. The Western Area is located mostly around the peninsula and is divided into two districts: the Western Area Rural and the Western Area Urban.

== Geography ==
Western Area is the wealthiest region of Sierra Leone, having the largest economy, the country's financial and cultural center, as well as the seat of the country's national government. Unlike the other regions in Sierra Leone, the western area is not a province.

It is divided into two districts:

- Western Area Rural
- Western Area Urban

Freetown serves as the administrative headquarters of both the Western Area and the Urban District, and served as the capital of the Rural District until 2009 when it was formally moved to the city of Waterloo.

=== Borders ===
To the northeast, the Western Area borders the North-Western Province, and to the southeast it borders the Southern Province. However, most of the boundaries of the Western Area is the shoreline of the Atlantic Ocean. The Western Area is the only region of Sierra Leone without a foreign border.

=== Cities, towns and villages include ===
- Adonkia
- Banana Islands, including (Dublin Island and Ricketts Island)
- Bathkump
- Bathurst
- Baw Baw
- Benguema
- Bunce Island
- Bureh Town
- Charlotte
- Cole Town
- Dublin
- Fogbo
- Freetown, largest city and national capital
- Gloucester
- Grafton
- Joe Town
- Kebbie Town
- Kent
- Kerry Town
- Kola Town
- Kossoh Town
- Koya
- Kwama
- Lakka
- Leicester
- Newton
- Ricketts
- Rokel
- Rokupa
- Russell
- Samuel Town
- Stones Town
- Sussex
- Tissana
- Tokeh
- Tombo
- Waterloo, second largest city and capital of the Western Area Rural District
- York

== Religion ==
Religion in Western Area District (2015)
Religion	Percent(%)
Islam	69.1%
Christianity	30.1%
Baháʼí	0.1%
Traditional African religions	0.0%
Other	0.6%
No religion	0.1%

== See also ==
- Subdivisions of Sierra Leone
