= Waterloo, Sierra Leone =

- Location in Sierra Leone
- Coordinates: 8°20′N 13°04′W
- Country: Sierra Leone
- Region: Western Area
- District: Western Area Rural District

Government
  - Type: City council
  - Mayor: Dennis Omojowo Browne (APC)

Population (2015)
  - Total: 55,000
- Time zone: UTC±00:00 (GMT)

Waterloo is a city in the Western Area of Sierra Leone and the capital of the Western Area Rural District, which is one of the sixteen districts of Sierra Leone. Waterloo is located about twenty miles east of Freetown. Waterloo is the second largest city in the Western Area region of Sierra Leone, after Freetown. The city had a population of 34,079 in the 2004 census, and 55,000 as per a 2015 estimate, while the Waterloo - Hastings Urban Area had a population of 208,795 in 2015. Waterloo is part of the Freetown metropolitan area.

Waterloo is a major urban transport hub and lies on the main highway linking Freetown to the country's provinces. Waterloo is an entirely urban area, and lies 25 miles to Port Loko District entrance border line in the Northern Province.

Waterloo is one of Sierra Leone's most ethnically diverse cities, as it is home to many of Sierra Leone's ethnic groups, with no single ethnic group forming even 30% of the population .

Although Waterloo is part of the larger Western Area Rural district council, the city has its own directly elected city council headed by a mayor. The current mayor of Waterloo is Dennis Omojowo Browne of the All People's Congress who was elected in the 2018 Sierra Leone local elections.

== History ==
Waterloo was founded in 1819 as a settlement for liberated Africans. Incorporated into the parish system under the tutelage of the Church Missionary Society (CMS), Waterloo was settled by soldiers from the second and fourth West India Regiment from Jamaica and Barbados. The town was named after the Anglo-Allied army victory over Napoleon Bonaparte in the Battle of Waterloo in present-day Belgium.

The ex-military men settled in "Soja Town" bordering King Street, an artery leading to King Yard which housed the police station, courthouse, and jailhouse. The settlers were later joined by several groups of Recaptives, whose integration into the village community was facilitated by Governor MacCarthy's insistence on education and religion via schools, personages and churches. Several Christian denominations, primarily of Anglican, Countess of Huntingdon, and Wesleyan persuasions established churches and schools throughout the fast-growing populace.

Following the establishment of the Mixed Commissions in Freetown in 1819 (primarily to set recaptured slaves free), the number of Recaptives in Freetown grew. This growth resulted in a corresponding increase in the Recaptives population in Waterloo. Unlike the original settlers from Jamaica and Barbados, the Recaptives had made minimal sustained contact with Western languages and cultures. In efforts to restore some lifestyle stability in their new environment, the Recaptives settled along ethnic or tribal lines. Thus, the Yoruba settled in Aku Town, the Igbo in Ibo Town, the ex-military Recaptives in Soja Town, etc.

The community which emerged established social welfare institutions and secret societies such as Osusu, Ojeh, Hunting, Geledeh, and Akanja as measures to perpetuate their culture, provide a framework for social stability, and increase their independence. With the inculcation of Christian values and Western education, and under the supervision of the village headman (who enforced the rule of law), Waterloo evolved as a stable economic, cultural, and socio-political centre.

In less than half a century since its inception, Waterloo emerged as an important economic hub buffering Sierra Leone's provincial capitals and the nation's capital. Throughout the 19th and 20th Centuries, the city continued to serve as a gateway to and from the hinterland and blossomed as a trading centre into which goods and services from Freetown and the Sierra Leone peninsula converged. Its economic prosperity coupled with its proximity to the city brought together diverse people from different parts of the nation.

== Geography ==
The town of Waterloo is located some 20 miles from Freetown. With a population estimated at approximately 40,000, it is the second largest city in the Western Area and an important crossroad where roads connecting provincial capitals and the Sierra Leone peninsula to the nation's capital meet. The prosperity which reigned in Waterloo throughout the 19th and 20th centuries was shattered by the outbreak of the Sierra Leone Civil War in the 1990s, during which rebel soldiers pillaged and ravaged homes, schools, churches, offices, and government buildings, with many inhabitants fleeing the town.

== People ==
Intermarriages between the newly arrived ex-servicemen from Barbados and Jamaica and the Africans liberated from slavery generously enriched elements of culture in the town. The language that resulted from the fusion of these cultures evolved into the Krio language, which retained its English base while absorbing other linguistic elements from a variety of African and European languages and dialects which is evident in words such as boku (beaucoup), encore (from French); otutu, alakpa, joko (Yoruba); sabi, pikin (Jamaican Maroon Creole and Portuguese); kapu (Mende), etc.

The descendants of these repatriated soldiers and the liberated Africans formed a nucleus of the Krio society in Waterloo. In addition, the skills, knowledge and attitudes that the new settlers acquired facilitated their integration into the new settlement and provided the foundation for cultural adaptation and socio-economic reconstruction.

Notable people from Waterloo include:

- Justice C.O. E. Cole, first president of the Republic of Sierra Leone
- Christian Cole, lawyer, the first black student at Oxford University
- Christiana Thorpe, religion & civil service
- Chief Mohammed Shitta Bey, Oku businessman & philanthropist
- Ibrahim Turay, Olympic sprinter

== Links with Liverpool ==
A British charity, the Waterloo Partnership, fundraises in Waterloo and Crosby areas of Liverpool for Waterloo, Sierra Leone.
