= Caulker (surname) =

Caulker is a surname. Notable people with the surname include:

== Sierra Leone ==
The Caulkers are a prominent family in Sierra Leone descended from the Englishman Thomas Corker (died 1700). Members have included:

- Stephen Caulker (died 1810), African Chief
- Richard Conray-Ba Caulker, (18??–1900) African Chief of the Bumpe Chiefdom 1864–1888
- Thomas Caulker (1846–1859), son of the above who died in London
- Thomas Neale-Caulker (died 1898), African Chief
- Charles B. Caulker
- Christian Caulker (born 1988), Sierra Leonean footballer

== Other ==
- Steven Caulker (born 1991), English footballer
