= Cleveland Tombstone =

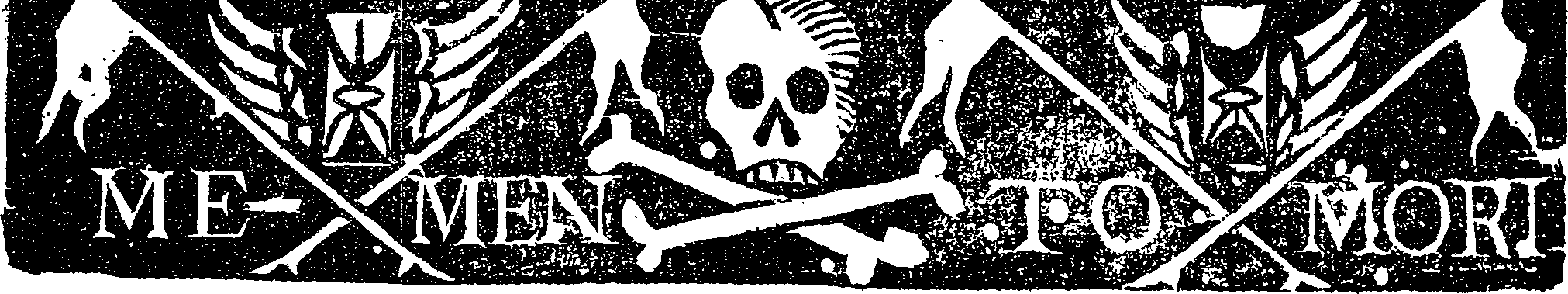
The tombstone uses the memento mori motif.

The Cleveland Tombstone is a national monument in Sierra Leone near Shenge. It was first erected in 1791 to memorialize James Cleveland, the mulatto king of the Banana Islands, by his sons. During a war between his family and the Caulker family led by Thomas Corker, the Caulkers moved the tombstone to their cemetery at Tasso Island, and again to Shenge at a later date. It was dedicated a National Monument of Sierra Leone in 1950.

The tombstone has a skull and crossbones, on the sides of which it is written MOMENTO MORI [sic]. The tombstone also bears the inscription:

Sacred to the Memory of Mr. James Cleveland late Proprietor of this Island who departed his life March 24, 1791 in the 37th year of his age. His surviving relative William Cleveland has caused this stone to be placed over this Grave as a tribute to the Memory of a Worthy Man.
