= Stephen Caulker =

King of the Banana Islands (died 1810)

Stephen Caulker (died 1810) was a king of the Banana Islands off the coast of present-day Sierra Leone. He had some distant Anglo-Irish ancestry and was mostly Sherbro in ancestry. Caulker was part of a hereditary dynasty that ruled as chiefs of the states of Bumpe and Shenge (Kagboro) in Sierra Leone from 1820 into the late 20th century.

== Background ==
Stephen Caulker was born in the Banana Islands, the son of Charles Caulker and his Bantu wife. His father was a descendant through Skinner Caulker of Thomas Corker, an English agent with the Royal African Company, and his Bantu wife or concubine, known as Seniora Doll. He conducted slave trading at Sierra Leone.

In 1797 Caulker seized the Banana Islands from King William Clevland, killing him. He was avenging the murder and beheading of his father, Charles Caulker, by Clevland's father, King James Cleveland, who had previously ruled there. The Clevelands were descendants of another British trader.

Stephen Caulker and his son Thomas Stephen Caulker established a successful political dynasty, the Bumpe Chiefdom, in mainland Sierra Leone. His son was king from 1810 to 1820, when the Banana Islands were incorporated into the colony of Sierra Leone by the British.

That year Caulker and his family established the Bumpe Chiefdom (also known as Bompeh) in south-central Sierra Leone. Their territory was concentrated in the northwest region of the Southwest District. Thomas Stephen Caulker was a paramount chief from 1820 to 1832, after which his son Charles Caulker became chief. In 1888 Bompeh was made part of Sierra Leone Protectorate. Caulker descendants ruled as hereditary chiefs until 1984.

Other Caulker descendants ruled as paramount chiefs in Shenge (later Kagboro) into the 20th century.
