= John Tucker (merchant trader) =

British slave trader

John Tucker was an English slave trader for the Royal African Company from London, England.

== Slave trading ==
Tucker went to Gbap, Sierra Leone, in 1665 alongside Thomas Corker who was the ancestor of the Sherbro Caulkers, the most notorious slave trading family in the Upper Guinea Coast. John Tucker married a Sherbro princess and together they had many children. The Sherbro Tuckers became a powerful slave trading clan and chiefdom in Gbap and many of them went to university in Europe as early as the 18th century.

In 1694 John Tucker signed the commission for the 1694 voyage of the Amity captained by Thomas Tew.
