= Richard Canreba Caulker =

Richard Canreba Caulker (18??–1901), also known as Canrah Bah Caulker, was ruler of the Bumpe Chiefdom, 1864–1888 and 1894–1901. This area became incorporated into the Sierra Leone Protectorate in 1888, and is now part of the Moyamba District of the independent Sierra Leone nation.

== Early life and education ==
Canrah Bah Caulker was born into one of the most powerful family dynasties among the Sherbro people, in the territory now known as Moyamba District, Southern Province, Sierra Leone.

Canrah Bah, also known as Richard, was born into the Caulker family of Sierra Leone.

The men had become major slave traders in the 18th century during the commercialisation of the Atlantic slave trade with the West Indies and North America. Descended from English colonial official Thomas Corker (1670-1799) and Seniora Doll, a Sherbro chief's daughter, the mixed-race family became one of the wealthiest in the region because of such trading.

The young Caulker likely attended Sierra Leone Grammar School, as British colonial authorities encouraged education among the leading families. He entered his family's trading business and became a merchant.

== Adult life ==
Caulker married and had a family. He sent his son, Thomas Caulker (1846-1859), as a young boy to England to be educated at a school founded by an evangelical Englishwoman. He lived with a minister and his wife. However, Thomas had eye problems and other health issues; he died at the age of 13 and was buried in the non-denominational garden cemetery, Abney Park Cemetery in Stoke Newington.

Later in the early 1850s, Caulker, as Chief of Bompey, was working with some other chiefs of the Sherbro country (including his relative, Thomas Stephen Caulker, Chief of the Plantain Islands), to suppress the slave trade in this territory.

They came to agreement with the Governor of the British colony of Sierra Leone in 1853, and the abolition of the regional trade was enacted into British law two years later by an Act of Parliament dated 14 August 1855. This authorized the British navy to intercept on the high seas any suspect slave trading vessels originating from or belonging to, inhabitants of Bompey, or to territories ruled by the other Sherbro signatories. Slaves liberated from such ships were generally resettled in Sierra Leone.

Bompey was incorporated by the British into the Sierra Leone Colony and Protectorate in 1888. In the 21st century, the Bumpe Chiefdom is part of the Moyamba District of the nation of Sierra Leone.
