= Corker =

Corker is an occupational surname. Notable people with the surname include:

- Adrian Corker (born 1969), English musician
- Bob Corker (born 1952), American politician
- Clifton L. Corker (born 1967), American judge
- Thomas Corker (1669/1670–1700) English agent for the Royal African Company
- Stephen A. Corker (1830–1879), American lawyer, Civil War veteran, slave owner, and politician
- James Corker (1753/1754–1791), English activist
- John Corker (born 1958), American football player
- Maurus Corker (1636–1715), English Benedictine
- Yusuf Corker (born 1998), American football player
