= Thomas Neale-Caulker =

Thomas Neale-Caulker (died 1898) was chief of Kagboro in Sierra Leone (1888–1898). He was killed during the Hut Tax War of 1898, in which he sided with the government and was reproached for his brutality.

He was the son of Thomas Stephen Caulker, and a member of the Caulker family, descendants of Thomas Corker.

He was an opponent of the Poro, a secret society prevalent amongst the Mende people. A practicing Christian he said: "I believe the society will, in God's time, die out of our midst. It will not be by violence, but by the power of the gospel." John Augustus Abayomi-Cole
