= Thomas Caulker =

Thomas Canry Caulker (c. 1846–1859), (Sherbro) was born into a prominent African family, and his father ruled as King of Bompey, an African polity established in 1820 in what is now Sierra Leone. Caulker is among an early generation of West Africans sent to England for their education. His father wanted him prepared for demands for government and commerce in his homeland, before the Sierra Leone Protectorate was established by Great Britain. His father's ambition for him was influenced by the evangelical Christianity in the region, introduced largely by British abolitionists.

== Family background ==
Thomas Canry Caulker was born into a powerful hereditary chiefdom in the Sherbro region. His father Richard Canreba Caulker (also written as Canrah Bah or Canrey Bey Caulker, see the younger Caulker's gravestone) was from a family that had become major slave traders during the commercialisation of the trade with the West Indies and North America during the 18th century. Descended from Anglo-Irish colonial official Thomas Corker and the Sherbro princess Seniora Doll, the mixed-race family had become one of the wealthiest in the region.

By the time of Thomas Caulker's birth, his family had aligned with the 19th-century abolition movement. His father, Richard Canreba Caulker, Chief of Bompey, was working with colonial officials and some other chiefs of the Sherbro country (including his relative, Thomas Stephen Caulker, Chief of the Plantain Islands), to suppress the slave trade in this territory.

They came to agreement with the Governor of the British colony of Sierra Leone in 1853, and the abolition of the trade was enacted into British law two years later by an Act of Parliament dated 14 August 1855. This authorized the British navy to intercept on the high seas any suspect slave trading vessels originating from or belonging to, inhabitants of Bompey, and the other Sherbro signatories. Slaves liberated from such ships were generally resettled in Sierra Leone.

Bompey was incorporated by the British into the Sierra Leone Colony and Protectorate in 1888. Today it is part of the Moyamba District of the country.

== Travel for education in London ==
In the early 1850s, while still a boy, Thomas Caulker was sent by his father to London for his health and to acquire a Christian education in the Countess of Huntingdon's Connexion, pioneered in the eighteenth century by the evangelical Selina Hastings, Countess of Huntingdon. The Caulker family and other Afro-European families frequently sent their children to England for an education. The younger Caulker lived with the Rev. J. K. Foster and his wife (Foster had formerly been a president of Cheshunt College, closely associated with the Methodist-leaning Connection).

Though very young, Thomas suffered from weakness of the eyes, which increased almost to blindness. He was sent to a school for the blind, but he was also afflicted by other medical problems and his health failed. He died at age 13 in 1859 in Canonbury in Islington while in the care of the Rev. Kirkman Foster. He was buried at the non-denominational garden cemetery, Abney Park Cemetery in Stoke Newington. The Rev. Kirkman Foster and his wife were later interred there.

Thomas' headstone read:

THOMAS CANRY CAULKER,
A native of Western Africa,
Son of
Canrah Bah Caulker,
King of Bompey

== Sources ==
- Great Britain Parliament (1855) An Act for Carrying Into Effect the Engagements Between Her Majesty and Certain Chiefs of the Sherbro Country Near Sierra Leone in Africa, for the More Effectual Suppression of the Slave Trade, London: George Edward Eyre and William Spottiswoode, Printers to the Queen's Most Excellent Majesty
- Sanneh, Lamin (1999). Abolitionists Abroad: American Blacks and the Making of Modern West Africa. London: Harvard Univ. Press (2nd edn Cambridge: Harvard Univ. Press 2001)
