= Caulker family of Sierra Leone =

African royal family

The Caulker family of Sierra Leone is an influential family which was established by the English slave trader Thomas Corker. The Caulker dynasty established itself following a conflict with King William Cleveland.

== Family tree ==
Family tree of the Caulkers of Sierra Leone

Thomas Corker; English agent for the Royal African Company; 1669 - 1700	Senora Doll; Sherbro princess or 'Duchess' of the Ya Kumba ruling house of the Yawri Bay Area; Died 1722
Stephen Corker 1685-17??	Robin "Skinner" Corker 1687

== Notable Caulkers from Sierra Leone ==
- Stephen Caulker (died 1810), African chief
- Richard Conray-Ba Caulker, (18??– 1900) African chief of the Bumpe Chiefdom 1864–1888
- Thomas Caulker (1846–1859), son of the above who died in London
- Thomas Neale-Caulker (died 1898), African chief
- Charles B. Caulker, African chief
- Steven Caulker (born 1991), professional footballer born in England
