= Thomas DeSaille Tucker =

American lawyer

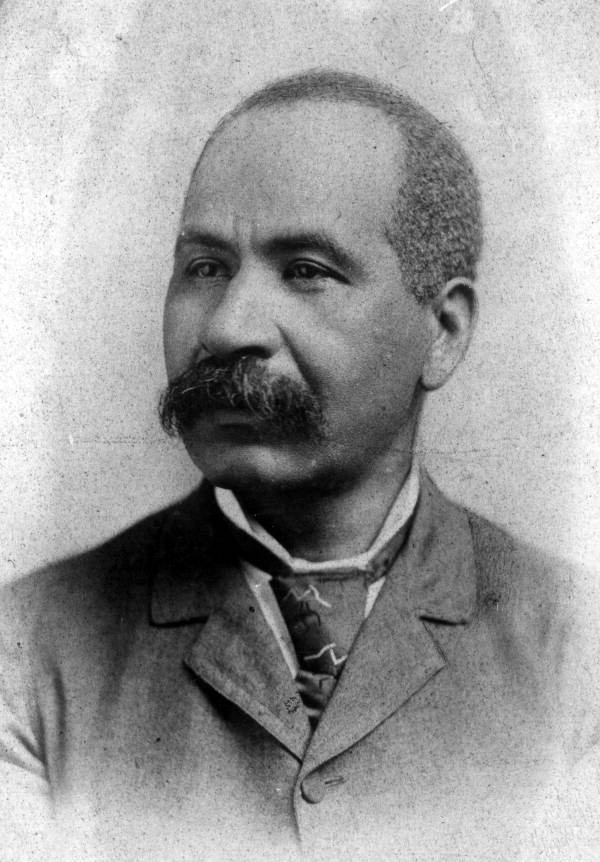
Thomas DeSaille Tucker

Thomas DeSaille Tucker or Thomas DeSaliere Tucker (July 21, 1844 – 1903) was an African-born lawyer, educator, and missionary. He was the first president of the State Normal College for Colored Students, which eventually became Florida Agricultural and Mechanical University.

== Biography ==
Tucker was born in Victoria, a small village directly east of Shenge, in the Sherbro territory of British Sierra Leone currently Kagboro Chiefdom, Moyamba District, Sierra Leone. His mother was the daughter of Sherbro chief Harry Tucker, a member of the Sherbro Tucker family, while his father was said to be an Englishman or a French explorer. He attended the Mende Mission of the American Missionary Association, a school founded by American missionaries who accompanied the captives from the Amistad back to Africa.

Missionary George Thompson brought 12-year-old Tucker to the United States. Two years later, Tucker enrolled in the preparatory program at Oberlin College. He graduated with his A.B. in 1865. During his time at Oberlin, he took a leave in 1862 to teach at the AMA's school for emancipated slaves at Fortress Monroe. Following his graduation he taught at schools in Georgetown, Kentucky and New Orleans, Louisiana.

Tucker studied law at Straight University in New Orleans and graduated with his LL.B. in 1882. The following year he was admitted to the bar in Florida and opened a law partnership with J.D. Thompson in Pensacola, Florida.

Tucker left his law practice and was appointed the first president of the State Normal College for Colored Students in 1887. The school opened for classes on October 3 in DeFuniak Springs, Florida. Thomas Van Renssalaer Gibbs, an African-American member of the Florida House of Representatives, became vice president of the school and essentially served as co-president with Tucker until his death in October 1898. Tucker presided over the school's relocation to Tallahassee, Florida, on property that was once the Highwood Plantation of Governor William Pope Duval and an infusion of funds thanks to the Second Morrill Act.

Tucker's presidency came to an end as a result of conflicts with William N. Sheats, who became Superintendent of Public Instruction in 1893. Sheats was a racist and white supremacist and opponent of miscegenation and black political participation who was the namesake of the notorious 1895 Sheats Law enforcing strict racial segregation in schools, later ruled unconstitutional by the Fourth Judicial Circuit Court of Florida. But Sheats also supported black schools and was an admirer of Booker T. Washington's advocacy of agricultural and industrial education. Tucker, however, favored a liberal arts approach to education designed for public school teachers and, despite changing the name of the school to the State Normal and Industrial College for Colored Students, did not sufficiently emphasize the agricultural and industrial approach favored by Sheats. Gradually, Tucker's authority was reduced, expenditures and personnel decisions were disputed and investigated, and finally, he was ousted and replaced by Nathan B. Young in 1901.

Tucker resumed the practice of law in Jacksonville, Florida. He died in 1903 and was buried in Baltimore, Maryland.
