= John Kizell =

African-American immigrant to Sierra Leone

John Kizell was an enslaved African who became a leader in Sierra Leone as it was being developed as a new British colony in the early nineteenth century. Believed born on Sherbro Island, he was kidnapped and enslaved as a child and shipped to Charleston, South Carolina, where he was sold again. Years later, after the American Revolutionary War, during which he gained freedom with the British and was evacuated to Nova Scotia, he eventually returned to West Africa. In 1792, he was among 50 native-born Africans among the 1200 predominantly African-American Black Loyalists resettled in Freetown.

A Baptist, Kizell belonged to the congregation of African American David George (Baptist). After reaching Freetown, Kizell soon returned to his native Sherbro Island, across the Sherbro River estuary from the mainland.

Kizell had learned English in South Carolina and soon served as an intermediary between the British colonial government and the Sherbro on the island. The people were also predominant in the nearby mainland region.

From about 1818 to 1820, Kizell worked with agents of the American Colonization Society, who had a resettlement plan for free blacks from the United States. He worked with Samuel Bacon, Samuel Crozer, and new African-American settlers to help colonize the territory that would later become the Republic of Liberia.

== Early life and slavery ==
John Kizell was long believed by historians to be Sherbro, born to a chief on what was later called Sherbro Island, in what is now Bonthe District, Southern Province, Sierra Leone. Kevin Lowther has proposed that Kizell may have been Bom or Krim, other peoples who lived on the islands and in this area near the Sierra Leone coast. As a child, Kizell (as named in North America) was captured and sold into slavery, taken during a visit to see his uncle, a chief who lived nearby.

== Slavery ==
Surviving the Middle Passage, the boy was sold again after his ship reached Charleston, South Carolina, which had a major slave market. He was named John. The city was the center of a major area of rice and long-staple cotton cultivation, two labor-intensive commodity crops that created a high demand for enslaved labor.

In 1779, during the American Revolutionary War, John learned of the Philipsburg Proclamation by British General Henry Clinton, who offered freedom to those enslaved by rebels who escaped to British lines. He had taken the surname Kizell and escaped during the Siege of Charleston when the British and allies surrounded the city. Kizell joined the British.

== Return to Africa ==
After the war, Great Britain kept its promise of freedom. Kizell was among nearly 3,000 Black Loyalists who were evacuated and resettled in Nova Scotia, along with white Loyalists. George III had promised them land in the new colony. Implementation of such plans was slow, and the immigrants suffered from the harsh climate, limited supplies, and, for the blacks, discrimination by present and former enslavers.

A short time passed before they were offered another choice. Great Britain was developing a new colony in West Africa for resettling the formerly enslaved people they had evacuated, including some "Black Poor" in London. Most were former enslaved African Americans from the United States. The British offered the Black Loyalists a chance for a colony.

Along with 1,200 African-American Black Loyalists, Kizell joined the expedition to Freetown on the coast. The Sierra Leone Company was a quasi-business that managed the development of the new settlement. Kizell helped establish Settler Town, Sierra Leone, the first area developed as part of Freetown.

== Kizelltown ==
Kizell ran a trading post on his native Sherbro land, a kind of outpost colony of Freetown. It was called Kizzelltown. He also served as an intermediary between British officials and inhabitants of Sherbro Island. They included Afro-Europeans such as the Caulkers and Clevelands, who were descendants of early white British slave traders and Sherbro women. Kizell became a prosperous trader and a Baptist preacher who established a church on Sherbro Island.

== Dealings with the ACS ==
In 1820, the American Colonization Society (ACS) was established. It intended to resettle free blacks from the United States to a new American colony in West Africa.

In 1818, Kizell had met their representatives Samuel J. Mills and Ebenezer Burgess, who visited to conduct a survey of potential sites and to report to the ACS about African colonization. Kizell also met Paul Cuffe, a wealthy black American shipbuilder who launched an independent effort to resettle free blacks in this area. Kizell told him the Sherbro lands would suit African-American settlers.

In 1820, Kizell helped ACS officials Samuel Bacon and Samuel Crozer, as well as African-American settlers such as Daniel Coker, negotiate with local leaders on the island for land.

== Debt ==
Kizell maintained ties with the African-American community in Settler Town, Sierra Leone and owned 278 lots in the city. Kizell fell into debt for unclear reasons and forfeited his property until he could repay the Sierra Leone Company.

== Bibliography ==
- Clifford, Mary Louise, From Slavery to Freetown: Black Loyalists After the American Revolution, McFarland, 2006, ISBN 0-7864-2557-1
- Ciment, James (2013). Another America: The Story of Liberia and the Former Slaves Who Ruled It. New York: Hill and Wang.
- Clegg, Claude A. (2004). The Price of Liberty: African Americans and the Making of Liberia. Chapel Hill: UNC Press
