= John Meheux =

Sheriff of the Colony of Sierra Leone

John Meheux in 1885

John Meheux (c. 1813 – 1886) was a Sierra Leonean colonial official who served as Sheriff of the Colony of Sierra Leone. Meheux was born to a Temne mother and Jean Meheux, a French merchant and trader. Meheux inherited extensive properties from his father in Kissy Road and Kissy Street. Meheux Street in Freetown, Sierra Leone commemorates the Meheux family.
