= Joseph Gomer =

Joseph Gomer may refer to:

- Joseph Gomer (missionary) (1834–1892), African American missionary
- Joseph Gomer (pilot) (1920–2013), African-American pilot
