= Battle of Accra =

Battle of Accra may refer to:

Either of the following battles in the First British-Ashanti War:

- The First Battle of Accra in 1824
- The Second Battle of Accra in 1825
