= South Denver, Colorado =

Former city in Colorado, United States

South Denver
- Former city
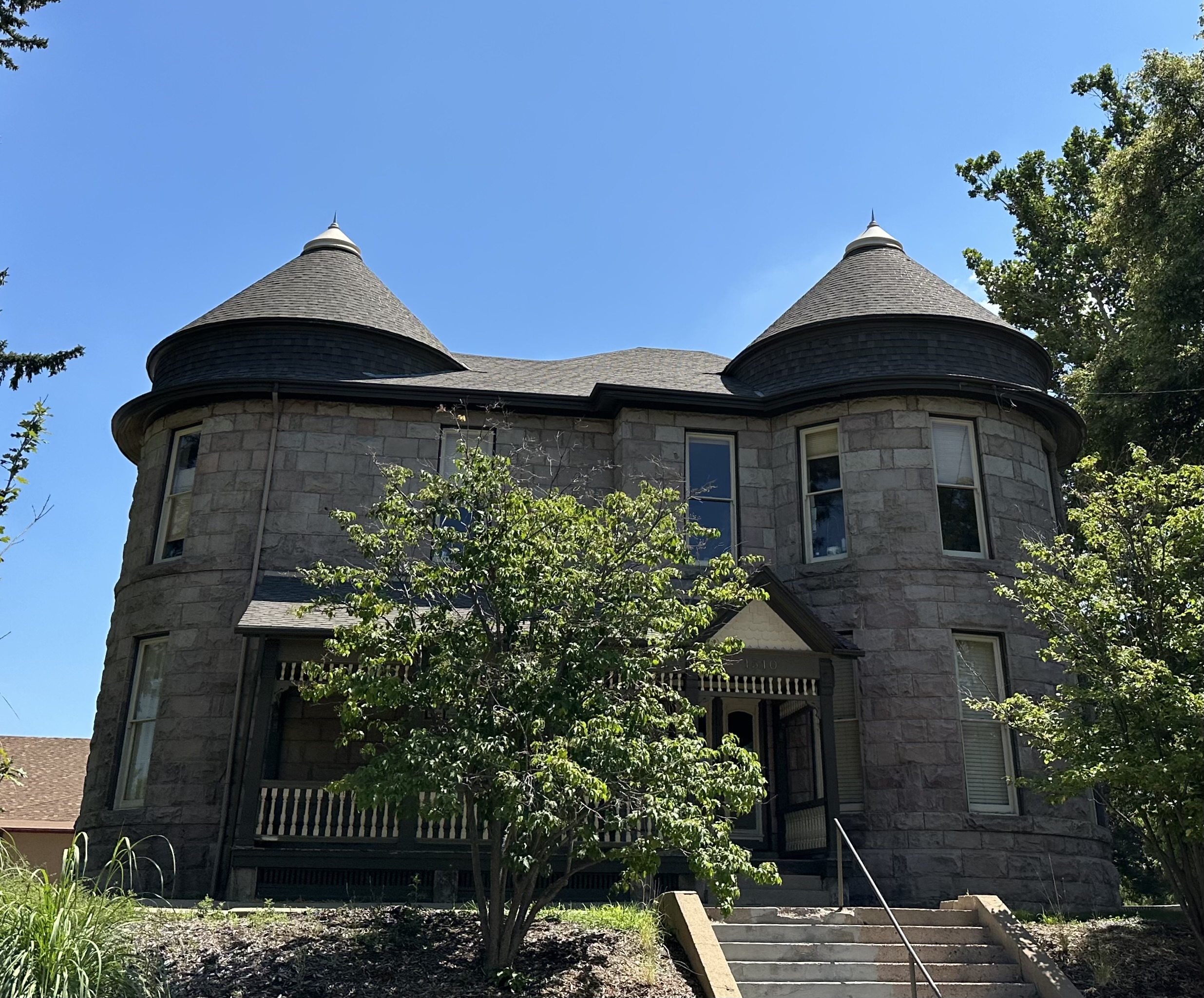
- Former town hall in modern Platt Park

- Location within the state of Colorado
- Coordinates: 39°40′42″N 104°57′44″W
- Country: United States
- State: Colorado
- County: Arapahoe (historic); Denver (modern day)
- Established: 1881
- Incorporated: August 9, 1886
- Annexed by Denver: February 7, 1894
- Demonym: South Denverite
- Time zone: UTC-7 (Mountain (MST))
  - Summer (DST): UTC-6 (MDT)

South Denver was an incorporated city in Colorado, United States, which was incorporated in 1886 and annexed by Denver in 1894. Covering almost 12 square miles that included the former site of Montana City, the South Denver community was established by James Fleming in 1881 as an alcohol-free community. Potato farmer Rufus "Potato" Clark led a group which donated land to allow the University of Denver to relocate to the area and escape the "moral and environmental pollution" of Denver. Incorporated as a town to enable the community to enforce vice laws, its anti-alcohol regulations surviving the city's dissolution. John Evans, the former Colorado governor, contributed to the community's development by fostering the establishment of the two Methodist-organized subdivisions of University Park Colony and Evanston.

Under duress from the 1893 Silver Panic, South Denver became one of many communities absorbed by Denver during the 1890s. Portions of the townsite now comprises the Denver neighborhoods of University and University Park.

== History ==
In 1881, James Fleming established the South Denver community to serve as a "dry" Denver suburb. Fleming, a young man who had made his wealth in the Pennsylvanian oil industry, sold much of what he owned in the area to permit the community to have transportation and residential development. In the center of the land he kept, Fleming constructed a Queen Anne-style home at 1520 Grant Street.

Though the area that comprised the area known as "South Denver" or the "South Side" was poorly defined in the 20 years following the 1860 establishment of Denver, the community of South Denver's formal boundaries were Alameda and Yale Avenues to the north and south respectively and Colorado Boulevard to the South Platte River from east to west. In all, the community's almost 12-square-mile area made it the largest of Denver's suburbs. South Denver included the former site of Montana City, a community established during 1858 Pikes Peak Gold Rush and the first settlement in the Denver area.

A municipal incorporation effort was organized by Fleming, Rufus Clark, and Avery Gallup in early 1886 in response to the saloons, dance halls, and gambling establishments near a racetrack Denver's Overland Park, to allow the area to legally enforce anti-vice laws. With help from others, the group created a petition and approached the 150 residents of the area in search of the 30 votes needed to establish the community. The effort was backed by nonresident property owners William A. H. Loveland and Theodore C. Henry, both owners of the Denver Circle Real Estate Company, and Charles L. McIntosh on behalf of interests in the Denver Circle Railroad Company. However, a pro-legal alcohol lobby known as the "liquor element" and 13 nonresident landowners moved against incorporation.

Forty signers filed the relevant documents in Arapahoe County court on June 16, 1886. Clark and four other men were appointed commissioners by the court to clerk the incorporation election to occur six weeks later. Saloon keeper Joe Lowe and other anti-prohibitionists campaigned against the incorporation effort but lost the July 31 election, which was decided by 65 votes for incorporation and 38 against (one ballot was left blank). The Arapahoe County court declared South Denver an incorporated town on August 9. Fleming was elected mayor, Gallup was elected as one of five trustees, and Clark was elected treasurer in the September 4 city election; each were elected for a one-year term and presented a salary of $1 per term. Fleming and Clark were reelected to their posts on April 1, 1887.

The anti-incorporation nonresident landowners, led by former Rocky Mountain News owner William Byers, hired a law firm and filed a suit in the Arapahoe County district court on November 27, 1886, claiming that the incorporation of South Denver was done illegally. The suit was again filed in the Colorado Supreme Court after its dismissal in the district court; the suit was again dismissed there on December 23, 1887.

Fleming was South Denver's first and only mayor, selling his still-surviving home to serve as South Denver's town hall during his mayoral tenure. The mansion also served as a library until 1913 and a jail. A lumberyard, named Fleming Brothers, opened by Fleming's cousins–Jesse, Calvin, and D. Carson–erected many of the town's homes with the ease of a shoemaker making shoes, per the community's newspaper, Denver Eye.

South Denver suffered as the 1893 Silver Panic in Denver shrank real estate values. Further exacerbating the trouble was the town's small population, large area, and growing debts. Much of South Denver's debts had accrued during the creation of a city water system, which was severely dilapidated by 1894. Despite desires to remain independent from their larger neighbor, financial considerations and slowing population growth spurred voters in South Denver to approve annexation by Denver in a 288–100 vote on January 30, 1894. Some voters had been convinced by Methodist Bishop Henry White Warren's promise that area would remain alcohol-free post-annexation. The annexation was implemented on February 7, 1894, with Denver taking on South Denver's $263,000 debt. Fleming's former home and the block on which it was constructed were included in the annexation as a public property and were renamed as "Platt Park" for James H. Platt Jr., a politician and businessman who drowned while fishing near Georgetown in June 1894.

=== University Park Colony and Evanston ===
John Evans, former Colorado territorial governor, had established the University of Denver as the Colorado Seminary in Denver's downtown in 1864, near the site of the modern Boettcher Concert Hall. As the city grew, this Methodist campus was increasingly surrounded by urban influences. Elizabeth Iliff Warren, then-widow of John Wesley Iliff and wife of Bishop Warren, announced on June 18, 1884, that she would donate $100,000 for the university to open a theology graduate school on the condition that the university move its campus from its "unsavory" site to a more academically conducive space. Elizabeth Warren's donation came with the further stipulation that an additional $50,000 be raised to support the new theological school; a condition university chancellor David Hastings Moore fulfilled. Evans led the search for a new campus site that followed, with several locations around Denver considered–including the later site of Stapleton International Airport.

During the latter 19th century, potato farmer Rufus "Potato" Clark exerted significant influence on the southern corridor out of Denver. Clark, a heavy drinker prior to arriving in Colorado with his family in 1859, had been converted during a Denver tent revival by the United Brethren and was engaged in a variety of charitable ventures. Though not a Methodist, Clark was approached in 1884 about supporting university's move and offered 40 acres of his land as a donation in what was then Arapahoe County. After raising the donation to 80 acres of his property and securing commitments in property and money from other landowners in the area, the university accepted Clark's offer. An additional 320 acres was purchased adjacent to Clark's donation for $75 an acre in 1886, bringing the university's holdings in the area to 400 acres.

Clark conditioned this donation on the premises that the community would be laid out in a tree-lined grid and that the sale and production of alcohol would be prohibited, thereby avoiding replicating Denver's "moral and environmental pollution". In portions of South Denver not gifted by Clark, the town priced liquor licenses at $3,500 per year, pricing out most alcohol-related ventures. The site provided an elevated view of 50 miles along the Front Range but was very rural; an early resident would later recall that rabbits and coyotes outnumbered people in the community for years. The land secured, it was announced the university would move "perhaps in two years, perhaps in seven" to the location now being called "University Park".

A quarter of the university's South Denver property was set aside in 1886, while the remainder were to be sold as 2,500 lots priced at between $300 and $1,400 a pair. Seeking to interest the Denver Methodist population, the Colorado Conference of the Methodist Episcopal Church described the future university location as beautiful and connected by rail in 1887. The first home built in University Park home was at 2525 Evans for university trustee J. H. Clough in 1886, followed one at 2184 S. Milwaukee for the Warrens. On November 26, 1887, Clark established the Evanston Real Estate and Trust Company. Clark platted a portion his property on the campus land as the Evanston subdivision, which was between modern Jewell and Iliff Avenues from north to south and Race and Downing from east to west. Here, he installed fencing around each lot and planted trees for shade. As with University Park's deeds, Clark introduced language lifted from Union Colony's deeds to prohibit the production and sale of alcohol in Evanston.

On April 16, 1888, the Methodist Episcopal Church's Colorado Conference held a meeting in Trinity Methodist Episcopal Church. The meeting included Evans and former Union Colony president Robert A. Cameron, as well as other former Union Colony officials. the University Park Colonization Society was established to held develop University Park and Evanston "into a formal Methodist prohibition suburb". Evans was appointed the organizer for the society during the meeting and Cameron became the society's president. Evans had experience in similar projects, having helped establish Evanston, Illinois, and Northwestern University. Additionally, Evans had invested in the Denver and New Orleans Railroad, which had built track through the area before reorganizing as the Colorado and Southern Railway, meaning he possessed property in the area. The society promised that misfortunes experienced in Evanston, Illinois, and at Union Colony in Greeley would not be repeated.

Evans opened a store and office building in 1888 to spur development in the area. Evans's office building housed the University Park Market from 1890 until 1968 and was the community's first post office. By 1894, it also housed University Park's first Sunday school. The building survives at its original location on the northeast corner at the intersection of Evans Avenue and Milwaukee Street as a real estate office. A Methodist church was incorporated in University Park on September 16, 1894, with 56 charter members; the congregation would meet at chapels on the University of Denver's campus until building their own chapel in 1926–1927.

== Legacy ==
In 1899, Clark sold 2,050 lots in Evanston to the university for $110,000 despite the lots being appraised at a value of $250,000–Clark stipulated that these lots be sold for a profit. Clark sold his remaining share of Evanston to William C. Johnston for $60,000 the same year; Clark used the proceeds from these sales to alleviate some of the University of Denver's debts and to rebuild a theological school named for Clark and his wife in Shenge, Sierra Leone. Despite Johnston's efforts to revive the area as an "elite, cultured university town", the concept of Evanston becoming a "Methodist colony" soon died.

Portions of what was once South Denver now encompass the adjacent University and University Park neighborhoods of Denver. As of 2016, some former areas of South Denver such as the University neighborhood had mortgages which retained the old covenants prohibiting alcohol sale and production.
