= Henry Ricketts =

English soldier and administrator (died 1838)

Major Henry John Ricketts (died 1838) was an English soldier and administrator who served in the Royal African Corps in British West Africa.

== Life ==
Ricketts was a survivor of the Battle of Nsamankow in 1824, where Sir Charles MacCarthy was defeated.

Ricketts was Governor of the Gold Coast 15 November 1826 – 11 October 1827, and 5 June 1828 – 25 June 1828. This was the period of the First Anglo-Ashanti War, which took place in the years 1824 to 1831.

Ricketts describes the circumstances of his first appointment in his account of that war. Charles Turner, the previous Governor, had died in March 1826. Sir Neil Campbell had been appointed Governor of Sierra Leone, where he arrived in August. He sailed on in HMS Lively, and arrived in September on the Gold Coast. A battle had been fought at Dodowa Forest. Campbell disembarked at Cape Coast Castle, and gave Edward Purdon, who had earlier served as Governor and was acting in the post, leave to return to the United Kingdom. He named Ricketts, then an army Captain, as the new Governor.

Promoted Major, Ricketts was ordered to sail to Sierra Leone in January 1828. He was required to return to the Gold Coast in June of that year, to oversee the hand-over of forts to merchants, and to evacuate the garrison. These moves were part of Dixon Denham's efforts to obtain peace with the Ashanti Empire.

Ricketts was then Governor of Sierra Leone 1829–1830. In poor health, he returned to the United Kingdom. Ricketts, Sierra Leone, one of the Banana Islands, is named after him.

In 1831 Ricketts transferred from the Royal African Corps to the 58th Regiment of Foot. He died at the Cape of Good Hope in 1838, on a journey from Ceylon.

== Publications ==
- 1831 Narrative of the Ashantee War, With a View of the Present State of the Colony of Sierra Leone, London: Simpkin and Marshall
