= Dad Clark =

Dad Clark or Clarke may refer to:

== People ==
- Dad Clark (baseball player) (1873 - 1956), an American Major League Baseball player
- Dad Clarke (1865 - 1911), an American Major League Baseball player
- Rufus Clark, an American farmer, philanthropist, and Colorado politician

== Places ==
- Dad Clark Park, a public park named for Rufus Clark in Highlands Ranch, Colorado
