= Thomas Stephen Caulker =

Thomas Stephen Caulker (died 1871), also known as Bar Tham, was the chief of Kagboro in Sierra Leone Protectorate (1888–1898).

Thomas Stephen Caulker was the son of Stephen Caulker and a member of the Caulker family. They descended from the two African-English sons of Thomas Corker (1670-1700) and his Sherbro wife, known as Seniora Doll. Corker was an agent with the Royal African Company in Sherbro country, now part of Sierra Leone.
