= Sherbro Tuckers =

Afro-British rulers in Sierra Leone

The Tuckers of Sherbro are an Afro-European clan from the Southern region of Sierra Leone. The clan's progenitors were an English trader and agent, John Tucker, and a Sherbro princess. Starting in the 17th century, the Tuckers ruled over one of the most powerful chiefdoms in the Sherbro country of Southern Sierra Leone, centered on the village of Gbap.

== Clan History ==
In the 1620s, there were a number of European agents in the Sherbro region of Sierra Leone; these traders were looking for camwood, ivory, and other such items, and traded with the locals. They were also looking for slaves to fulfill a growing demand for slave labor in European colonies in the Americas. In the late 17th century, the Gambia Adventurers and the Royal African Company began sending many agents to the region. In 1665, an agent in the service of the Gambia Adventurers called John Tucker left England and went to Sierra Leone alongside Zachary Rogers (progenitor of the Afro-European clan the Rogers). Upon arriving in Sherbro Country, John Tucker and Zachary Rogers took the daughters of a Sherbro chief as their wives as was customary in order to gain trading rights in the region.

Being a matrilineal society, the descendants of John Tucker were able to maintain claims to the chieftaincy throne. The children of John Tucker and the Sherbro princess gained control of their mother's kingdom and utilised their father's name. Politically, the Tuckers would become one of the most influential and prominent Sherbro families during the 17th and 18th centuries, and were able to expand their powerful chiefdom into other territories. Although they maintained European connections (some of them going to England to attend school), they remained thoroughly 'Africanised' taking part in local cultural institutions such as the Poro society. It was only through such local institutions that they were able to gain control over more territory.

Besides maintaining claims to chieftaincy, some Tucker descendants became powerful traders and middlemen between African and European business interests. Their strong ties to European culture and language helped them expand their influence over the Sherbro trade industry. Particularly in the Southern Sierra Leone slave trade, members of Afro-European clans such as the Rogers, the Caulkers, and the Tuckers played an integral role as middlemen, allowing them to accumulate material wealth as an emergent merchant class.

In the mid-19th Century, elements of the American Missionary Association moved to the colony of Sierra Leone, evangelizing in the Hinterland, with a zeal spurred on by the Amistad Revolt. On land granted to Sengbe Pieh and the La Amistad returnees, the association would go on to establish an American Mission School in territory under the control of Sherbro Chief Harry Tucker. Graduates of such schools would go on to secondary schools such as Albert Academy and The Harford School for Girls in Moyamba. After receiving a Western education at such schools locally, hinterland youth, including many Tucker descendants would become integrated into the colonial government apparatus. Along with Freetown's Krios, such Western-educated hinterland youth would also help in the negotiations of Sierra Leone's independence.

== Notable Tuckers ==
- Patricia Kabbah, First Lady of Sierra Leone
- Thomas DeSaille Tucker; educator, lawyer, and co-founder of Florida A&M University.
