= Kpana Lewis =

Sierra Leonean tribal chief (1830–1912)

Personal details
- Born: April 18, 1830 Sherbro Island, Sierra Leone, British West Africa
- Died: May 18, 1912 (aged 82) Accra, Gold Coast
- Occupation: Sherbro chief and an opponent of colonial rule of the British in Sierra Leone.
- Profession: Warrior, tribal leader

Kpana Lewis (April 19, 1830 – May 10, 1912) was a Sherbro chief from Sierra Leone and an opponent of colonial rule of the British. He exercised strong influence over all Sherbro chiefs.

Kpana Lewis was born in 1830 in Sherbro Island in the Southern Province of Sierra Leone to a politically dominant family of the Sherbro aristocracy. His grandfather, Bai Kong Kuba Lewis, was the most dominant king among all of the Sherbro people.
