= Heddle (surname) =

Heddle is a surname of Scottish origin.

People with the surname include:

- John Heddle (1941–1989), British Conservative Party politician
- Charles Heddle (1812–1889), Scottish-Sierra Leonian businessman and shipowner
- Kathleen Heddle (1965–2021), Canadian rower
- Enid Moodie Heddle (1904–1991), Australian poet and writer for children
- Matthew Forster Heddle (1828–1897), Scottish physician and amateur mineralogist
- Ian Heddle (born 1963), Scottish footballer

== Given name ==
- Heddle Nash (1894–1961), an English lyric tenor
