= Daniel Francis =

Daniel Francis may refer to:

- Daniel Francis (historian) (born 1947), Canadian historian and journalist
- Daniel Francis (American football) (born 1984), American and Canadian football defensive back
- Daniel Francis (actor), British actor
- Danny Francis (footballer, born 1986), Dominican football forward
- Daniel Francis (footballer, born 2002), Sierra Leonean football left-back
- Daniel Francis (footballer, born 2003), Nigerian football midfielder
- Daniel Francis (politician), British MP for Bexleyheath and Crayford
