= List of National Monuments of Sierra Leone =

The National Monuments of Sierra Leone, in West Africa, are proclaimed in accordance with the Monuments and Relics Ordinance of 1947 with Dr Macormack Charles Farrell Easmon serving as the first chairman of the Monuments and Relics Commission. Eighteen National Monuments have been proclaimed, although two have since been demolished. Sierra Leone accepted the UNESCO World Heritage Convention in 2005, but is yet to nominate a site for inscription. A three-year research project funded by the UK Arts and Humanities Research Council in the late 2000s investigated the "object diaspora" of movable Sierra Leonean cultural properties in the context of European museums and has led to the creation of a digital resource relating to the country's cultural heritage. The sites are maintained by the Sierra Leonean Monuments and Relics Commission, a branch of the country's Ministry of Tourism and Culture.

The two National Monuments that are no longer traceable were both in Freetown. They were a fireplace removed from a now demolished building and some military butts (shooting ranges).

Site	Location	Founded	Proclaimed	Location	Description
Bunce Island	Sierra Leone River	17th century	1948	8°34′9.86″N 13°2′24.84″W	Site of an 18th-century British slave castle on Bunce Island.
Heddle's Farm	Freetown	1820	1948	8°28′27.11″N 13°13′3.17″W	Prominent residence, now in ruins, that was owned by several notable colonial families.
De Ruyter Stone	Freetown	1664	1948	8°29′18.11″N 13°14′16.8″W	An inscribed rock left by Dutch Admiral Michiel de Ruyter, Freetown's oldest monument.
Bastions of Fort Thornton	Freetown	1805	1949	8°29′3.12″N 13°14′0.78″W	Fortifications on Tower Hill
Earthworks and Live Stockade at Masakpaidu	Kono District	c.1800	1949	8°50′49.48″N 11°1′9.43″W	An abandoned fortified village that was founded before the arrival of Europeans.
Gateway to the King’s Yard	Freetown	1817	1949	8°29′18.85″N 13°14′18.73″W	Gateway through which ex-slaves entered the settlement of Freetown.
Ruins of John Newton’s House and slave barracoons	Moyamba District	1725	1949	7°54′37.43″N 12°59′25.21″W	Site of the slaver settlement founded by John Newton.
Cleveland Tombstone	Moyamba District	1791	1950	Near Shenge	An 18th century European gravestone.
Old Wharf Steps and Guard House	Freetown	1818–9	1953	8°29′20.13″N 13°14′15.80″W	Early 19th century stairs leading down to Government wharf.
Old city boundary guns	Freetown	c.1800	1953	1# 8°28′59.90″N 13°12′46.07″W; 2# No longer visisble 3# 8°28′22.95″N 13°14′11.97″W	Three 18th Century cannons that probably came from a condemned slave ship
Old Fourah Bay College building	Freetown	1845–8	1955	8°28′37.9″N 13°13′16.3″W	The 19th century four-storey building at Fourah Bay College developed into the first University College in Africa.
St. John's Maroon Church	Freetown	1820	1956	8°29′8.8″N 13°14′11.9″W	It is built from the ship timbers that brought the first Jamaican Maroons to Freetown.
St Charles' Church and King’s Yard wall	Regen Village	1816	1959	8°28′45.56″N 13°13′33.56″W	The oldest stone church in Sierra Leone and the third oldest in Africa.
Firing point and guns near Old Wharf	Dublin, Banana Islands	18th & 19th century	1956	8°8′11.07″N 13°11′32.66″W	Early British fortifications against pirates that were established 80 years before Freetown.
Martello Tower	Freetown	1805	1961	8°29′15.51″N 13°14′7.70″W	Built to counter any threat from Napoleon.
Grave of Captain Lendy	Kono District	1893	1965	8°9′7.97″N 10°59′47.46″W	Burial site of a British officer who was accidentally killed during a conflict with the Wassoulou Empire.

== See also ==
- History of Sierra Leone
- List of heritage registers
- Art repatriation
- UNESCO General History of Africa
