= Robert Corker (MP) =

British merchant and politician

Robert Corker (1668–1731) was a British merchant and politician who sat in the House of Commons from 1722 to 1731.

== Early life ==
Corker was baptized on 29 January 1668, the eldest son of Thomas Corker of Connelstown, County Meath, and his wife Jane Newman, daughter of John Newman of Falmouth. His father was an Irish ship's doctor, who arrived at Falmouth and settled there. Corker was young when his father died, and his uncle, John Newman, a local attorney, apprenticed him to a merchant in Falmouth. He was described as ‘A lad of insinuating worldly parts’ and he succeeded in 1695 to the business and to ‘his master's great house’, which became known as Corker's house. His brother, Thomas Corker was apprenticed to the Royal Africa Company and was assigned to the post of Chief Agent for their York Island factory as well as agent in Gambia.

Corker was a co-owner of the Dragon a ship that transported slaves. In 1699, it set sail in Topsham, 57 slaves were purchased in Gambia where they were then taken to Barbados. There was an uprising on the ship in which seven were killed and thirteen died on the journey.

== Career ==
Corker became receiver of the Duchy of Cornwall in 1708, and bought property in Cornwall, mainly in and around Bossiney. He was dismissed from the receivership by Robert Harley in 1712 and was re-instated in 1720 at the time when he procured a patent for a whale-fishery off the coasts of Cornwall. At the 1722 general election he was returned unopposed as Member of Parliament for Bossiney. He was returned unopposed again at the 1727 general election. His only recorded vote was with the Administration on the civil list arrears in April 1729. In 1729, he tried to sell his property because he was £11,000 in debt to the duchy on the receipts from tin. However he was unable to sell the lands or to borrow any money on the estate. and in the end he had to make over all his property to John Hedges, treasurer to the Prince of Wales.

== Personal life ==
Corker's first wife died in January 1726 and he married secondly Mary Rouchliffe of St. Clement Danes on 28 November 1726. He died without issue on 1 March 1731. His estates were sold after his death for the benefit of Frederick, Prince of Wales, to whom as Duke of Cornwall, he owed £23,000 for arrears since June 1727.

Parliament of Great Britain
Preceded by Henry Cartwright; Samuel Molyneux	Member of Parliament for Bossiney; 1722–1731; With: Henry Kelsall 1722-1727; John Hedges 1727-1731	Succeeded by James Cholmondeley; John Hedges
