= Caulker =

Caulker may refer to:

- Caulking
- Caulker (surname)
- Caye Caulker, an island in the Caribbean Sea
