= York Island =

York Island may refer to:

- New York Island (Manhattan)
- York Island (Antigua and Barbuda)
- York Island (Queensland)
- York Island (Sierra Leone)
- York Island (Wisconsin)
- York Island (Garfield County, Montana) in Garfield County, Montana
- York Island (British Columbia) in British Columbia, Canada

== See also ==
- Yorks Islands (Montana) in Broadwater County, Montana
