= Ricketts, Sierra Leone =

- Location in Sierra Leone
- Coordinates: 8°06′14″N 13°13′36″W
- Country: Sierra Leone
- Region: Western Area
- District: Western Area Rural District
- Time zone: UTC-5 (GMT)

Ricketts is a coastal fishing village on Banana Islands off Yawri Bay, around the peninsula in the Western Area Rural District of Sierra Leone. Ricketts is an island and is reached only by boat or helicopter. The major industries in the village are fishing and tourism.

The population of Ricketts is almost entirely made up of the Creole and Sherbro ethnic groups. Krio is the primary language of communication in the village.

== History ==
Ricketts was founded by Henry Ricketts in 1830 as a settlement to provide accommodation for liberated enslaved Africans who had been brought to Freetown by the British Royal Navy West Africa Squadron. Previously, the native Sherbro lived in the area.
