= Joseph Gomer (missionary) =

African American missionary

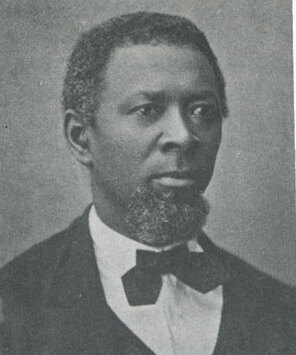
- Born: 1834
- Died: September 1892 (aged 57–58)
- Occupation: Missionary
- Spouse(s): Mary Gomer

Joseph Gomer (1834 – September 6, 1892) was an African American missionary on behalf of the United Brethren Church active in Sierra Leone.

Gomer was born in Michigan. During the American Civil War he served in the Union Army. Following the end of the war he settled in Dayton, Ohio. Here he became involved with the Third United Brethren Church. He married a widow, Mary (Martha) Finley, also known as Mary Green, in 1865. In 1870 the couple were approved by the church for approved for missionary work in Sierra Leone, where they arrived in 1871. Here they were stationed at Shenge, Sherbro Island. They joined a mission station which had been founded in 1855 and which grew coffee and rubber trees. Gomer introduced improved farming methods. Following a fund-raising tour of the United States, he established an industrial school. He was in the United States again in 1882, and in 1889.

He died from apoplexy in Sierra Leone in 1892, in his fifties. His widow stayed in Africa for two more years, then returned to the United States, where she died in 1896. In 2007, there was an exhibit about the Gomers at United Theological Seminary in Dayton.
