= Isaak de Graaf =

Dutch cartographer

- Born: 1668; Amsterdam, Dutch Republic
- Died: 5 September 1743 (aged 74–75); Amsterdam, Dutch Republic
- Occupations: Cartographer, instrument maker, map drawer
- Employer: Dutch East India Company
- Known for: Atlas Amsterdam
- Spouse: Sanderina de Brauw
- Parent(s): Abraham de Graaf; Susanna Pietersz Eppingh

Isaak de Graaff (1668 – 5 September 1743) was a Dutch map maker.

== Early life and family ==
Isaak de Graaf was born in Amsterdam in 1668, the son of Abraham de Graaf and Susanna Pietersz Eppingh. His father worked for the Dutch East India Company (VOC) and authored several works on navigation.

Isaac de Graaf married Sanderina de Brauw in Utrecht in 1708. They set up home on the Brouwersgracht in Amsterdam.

== Career ==
Isaak de Graaf worked as a cartographer for the Dutch East India Company (VOC). In 1705 he became the chief map maker for the VOC's Amsterdam chamber, a position he held for 38 years, until 1743.

The preparation and control of navigation charts was closely regulated within the VOC. Charts were produced for use by the company's ships and were not normally printed or sold publicly, helping to protect geographic knowledge used in the company's long-distance trading routes.

In this role De Graaf produced manuscript navigation charts used by VOC ships operating within its trading network. Many of these maps were drawn by hand on vellum, a durable material made from animal skin that could withstand use at sea.

Many of De Graaf's charts were so-called passage charts (Dutch: overzeilers), which guided ships across long ocean routes. One chart of the Atlantic Ocean shows the sailing route followed by VOC vessels from the Netherlands past Madeira, the Canary Islands and the Cape Verde islands before crossing the equator and continuing toward the Cape of Good Hope.

The charts included compass roses and networks of rhumb lines that helped sailors maintain a constant compass bearing when plotting a course across the ocean. Important points along the route were also marked, helping ships navigate areas near the equator where winds and currents could easily push them off course.

Surviving charts attributed to De Graaf include maps of the Atlantic Ocean, Sumatra, the Sunda Strait, the Java Sea and the northern coast of Java.

== de Graaf map discovered ==
In 2015 following the discovery of the wreck of the Diemermeer , further research revealed that one of de Graaf's maps was found in the National Library of Australia. This map was the original ship’s navigational map, an example of a navigational aid of which very few survive. The map was drawn by de Graaf in 1735, shortly before the ship was built. The last voyage of the ship is recorded on the map.
