= Diemermeer (ship) =

History

Dutch Republic
- Name: Diemermeer
- Namesake: Polder near Amsterdam
- Owner: Dutch East India Company; Chamber of Amsterdam
- Completed: 1736
- Maiden voyage: Texel–Batavia
- Fate: Wrecked, Banana Islands, Sierra Leone, 1747

General characteristics
- Type: East Indiaman
- Displacement: 850 tons
- Length: 44.3 m (145 ft)

The Diemermeer was a Dutch East Indiaman of the eighteenth century which was wrecked on the Banana Islands, Sierra Leone in 1747.

After conducting three successful voyages to the Far East, the ship sank on the way back during the fourth voyage. The wreck was rediscovered in 2014 by a diving team led by Peter Wytykowski. Despite initial problems identifying the wreck they were eventually able to do so thanks to archival research work by Arthur Scheijde in the Netherlands, Sri Lanka and Australia. The original navigational chart of the Diemermeer, drawn by Isaak de Graaff, was found in the National Library of Australia.
