= James Corker =

James Corker or James Cleveland (born 1753/1754 – 24 March 1791) was a man of English descent who took part in clan fighting in precolonial Sierra Leone.

== Background ==
James Cleveland was the son of English slaver William Cleveland and his Kissi mistress. Cleveland had two half-siblings, John and Elizabeth, who were the children of William and his royal Sherbro wife, Kate Corker, a daughter of Chief Skinner Corker (son of the original Englishman Thomas Corker).
