= Peter L. Tucker =

Peter Louis Tucker (1927-2017), was a notable Sherbro civil servant and he was once the Chief Executive for the Commission for Racial Equality in the United Kingdom a position he had from 1976 to 1982.

== Career ==
Peter Tucker was the Chairman of the Law Reform Commission - a position he has held since 2003.

== Family ==
Peter Tucker was a member of the aristocratic Sherbro Tucker family of Sierra Leone and his niece was Patricia Kabbah, that country's one time first lady. His children: Gerald, Albert, Michael, Yeama, Cynthia, Peter, Agnes and Rufina.

== Resources ==
- "Book Review: The Tuckers of Sierra Leone 1665-1914". manovision.com. Archived from the original on 11 October 2007.
- "Sierra Leone: News & Information | Finance & Credit Updates". statehouse-sl.org. Archived from the original on 28 July 2011.
- "Sierra Leone: News & Information | Finance & Credit Updates". statehouse-sl.org. Archived from the original on 28 July 2011.
- "Sierra Leone: News & Information | Finance & Credit Updates". statehouse-sl.org. Archived from the original on 28 July 2011.
- https://web.archive.org/web/20070930183555/http://people.africadatabase.org/en/person/17002.html
- Ayissi, A.N.; Poulton, R.; United Nations Institute for Disarmament Research (2006). Bound to Cooperate: Conflict, Peace and People in Sierra Leone. United Nations Institute for Disarmament Research. p. 24. ISBN 9789290451839.
- "Google Image Result for http://ipsnews.net/fotos/MohamedFofana131207Edited.jpg".
