= William J. Watkins Sr. =

African-American abolitionist, educator, and minister (1803–1858)

The Reverend William J. Watkins Sr.
- Born: c. 1803; Baltimore, Maryland, US
- Died: 1858 (aged 54–55); Canada
- Monuments: The William J. Watkins Educational Institute
- Movement: Abolition, anti-colonization
- Spouse: Henrietta Russell

William J. Watkins Sr. (c. 1803–1858) was an African-American abolitionist, educator, and minister from Baltimore, Maryland.

== Early life ==
Watkins was born in about 1803 in Baltimore, Maryland, the son of William Watkins, a founding trustee of the Sharp Street Methodist Church.

Watkins attended the Bethel Charity School, which Daniel Coker founded as a school for black children in 1807, despite Maryland laws forbidding the education of black people. At the age of 19, Watkins became a teacher at the school. This followed the departure of Coker to be part of the colonization movement, moving to Liberia.

== Personal life ==
Watkins married Henrietta Russell in the mid-1820s.

Watkins and Russell had eight children, including William J. (1826), Richard R. (1827), George T. (1828), John L. (1831), Henry G. (1834), Henrietta (1836), Robert P. (1841), and Lloyd N. (1845). William J., like his father, became a prominent abolitionist, at one time writing for Frederick Douglass's The North Star.

In 1852, Watkins moved to Toronto, Canada, followed by his son William J. He died in Canada in 1858.

Watkins also raised his niece, Frances Ellen Watkins Harper, following the death of her family, exposing her to ideas of abolition, and also teaching her in his school until the age of 13. Frances would become one of the co-founders of the American Women's Suffrage Association (AWS) during the mainstream Women's Suffrage Movement, in 1869. Francis was also an accomplished and much-published African-American poet.

== Career ==
Watkins is noted as having had a variety of positions, including teacher, newspaper correspondent, minister for the Sharp Street AME Church, founder of a Black Literary Society, and a "self-taught practitioner of medicine."

As a teacher, Watkins merged the Bethel Charity and Sharp Street schools, creating Watkins' Academy for Negro Youth, between 1820 and 1828. It ran for over twenty years, providing free education for black children, teaching between 50 and 70 students per year.

Watkins' work as a teacher and abolitionist were tied together, holding the conviction that education was essential in the freedom of African Americans.

== Abolition work ==
Watkins was a staunch slavery abolitionist, as well as an opponent to the colonization movement, whose proposed solution to slavery was to send black people back to Africa in order to Christianize Africa. He wrote antislavery and anti-colonization pieces, presented in writing and as speeches, making points that the colonization movement was more to serve white people than it was to free black people. With his work beginning in the 1820s and continuing until the end of his life, his writings appeared in Freedom's Journal, William Lloyd Garrison's The Liberator, Benjamin Lundy's Genius of Universal Emancipation, and, later in life, Frederick Douglass' Paper.

Watkins met Garrison shortly before he began The Liberator, shaping Garrison's views on colonization. Watkins would later become a subscription agent for The Liberator, which helped spread abolitionist ideas within Baltimore.

== Legacy ==
Watkins is the namesake of The William J. Watkins, Sr. Educational Institute, whose stated mission is to "ensure that ALL children, especially those in under-served and under-resourced communities, receive the BEST education possible."
