= De Ruyter Stone =

The De Ruyter Stone is a national monument in Sierra Leone. It is located in Freetown and was carved into by Michiel de Ruyter during the Second Anglo-Dutch War in 1664 when his force arrived in Africa to destroy British settlements.

== History ==
The stone was carved into by Michiel de Ruyter in 1664 during the Second Anglo-Dutch War. The rock itself is located underground on the coast of Freetown. Ruyter had just come off of the sacking of the factories and forts at Bunce Island and Tasso Island. The stone was six feet underground until in 1923, when it was rediscovered during construction. It was promptly reburied to protect against vandalization. In 1948 it was proclaimed to be a historical monument of Sierra Leone. That same year, it would be unearthed and then reburied every 10 years for inspections. In 2020, the concrete above the De Ruyter Stone was photographed as covered in a layer of garbage and discolored liquid, which drew criticism from local media.

== Inscription ==
The stone's original inscription reads: ’M.A. Ruyter. I. C. Meppel, Vice Admiral, West Fries, Vant A.D. 1664

The stone also features hundreds of writings and drawings from slaves, who would drink from the water above the stone. Drawn were paddles, boats, stone pillars, and unidentified objects.

== See also ==
- List of National Monuments of Sierra Leone
