= Ephraim Bacon =

American church minister

Ephraim Bacon IV
- Born: c. February 14, 1780; Sturbridge, Massachusetts
- Died: January 10, 1861; Pekin, Illinois
- Occupation: Church minister
- Known for: Participation in the second American Colonization Society expedition

Ephraim Bacon IV (c. February 14, 1780 – January 10, 1861) was an American church minister who served as US government agent on the second American Colonization Society expedition to Africa in 1821. The expedition struggled to purchase land in Sierra Leone to found a colony and many of the colonists died from fever. Bacon was affected by the disease and fled the expedition on a British ship to Barbados, later returning to the United States. US Navy officer Robert F. Stockton was sent to take over negotiations and eventually secured land to found a colony that would become Liberia.

== African expedition ==
Ephraim Bacon was a church minister. He was commissioned as a US government agent for the second American Colonization Society (ACS) expedition to Africa, together with Jonathan B Winn. The expedition followed the failure of the first party, on which Ephraim's brother Samuel Bacon had died whilst serving as government agent. The ACS agents on the second expedition were Christian Wiltberger and Joseph R Andrus. Bacon was accompanied on the expedition by his wife.

The expedition consisted of 33 emigrants, mostly free African-Americans, who sailed on board the brig Nautilus under Captain Robert F. Stockton. The Nautlius left the United States on 21 January 1821 and arrived at the British colony of Sierra Leone on 9 March. The expedition's leaders had no specific location in mind for establishing a colony and stayed in Fourah Bay whilst looking for a site. The inhabitants of Sherbro Island, where many of the first expedition had perished, refused to sell land to the ACS. Negotiations with King Ben of the Bassa territory also proved unsuccessful as the ACS refused to pay an ongoing fee to the king of $300 per year for the 40 square miles (100 km^{2}) of land.

Bacon and Andrus chartered a schooner, the Augusta, to search southern Sierra Leone for a site. Bacon attempted to encourage more emigrants to the expedition by compiling an account of his work, entitled Abstract of a Journal of E. Bacon, Assistant Agent of the United States, to Africa, which was published in Washington DC in 1821. Bacon noted the religious fervour of the Sierra Leoneans, describing how they spent all day in church on Sundays.

== Flight to Barbados ==
With negotiations ongoing the ACS sent Eli Ayres to help the expedition secure land. Upon his arrival he found that Andrus and Winn had died of fever and Bacon, who had also been afflicted, had fled the colony. Bacon had found a British vessel which provided him passage to Barbados; he later recovered and returned to the United States. The colonists Bacon had abandoned were distrustful of the ACS and its officers; even after threatened by Ayres many refused to join him and remained as residents of Sierra Leone.

The ACS persuaded President James Monroe to have Stockton take over negotiations. Stockton secured land at Cape Mesurado from King Peter of the Dey at gunpoint, in exchange for goods worth less than $300. This site grew into the colony of Liberia.
