= Heddle's Farm =

Heddle's Farm is a national monument in Freetown, Sierra Leone named after Charles Heddle. Before being sold to the Sierra Leonean government in 1878, it belonged to many people who were influential in the area. In 1948, it was proclaimed as a national monument.

== History ==
The land was originally allocated to the Nova Scotian settlers who arrived in 1792. However, in 1812, along with adjoining land, these lots were assigned to Charles William Maxwell, Governor of Sierra Leone. Heddle's Farm was built in 1820 and housed various notable people, including governor Charles MacCarthy and Kenneth Macaulay before coming into the possession of Charles Heddle, an African-Scottish businessman. In 1878, Heddle sold the residence to the government, and it was proclaimed to be a national monument in 1948. In the 1960s, Heddle's Farm was incorporated into Fourah Bay College's botanical gardens. As of today, little remains of the house beyond foundation and landscaping work.

== See also ==
- List of National Monuments of Sierra Leone
