= Samuel Bacon =

American journalist

- Born: July 22, 1781; Sturbridge, Massachusetts
- Died: May 2, 1820 (aged 38); Cape Shilling, Sierra Leone Colony
- Occupations: Lawyer, US Marine Corps officer, District Attorney and religious minister
- Known for: Participation in the first American Colonization Society expedition
- Political party: Democrat

Samuel Bacon (July 22, 1781 – May 2, 1820) was an American lawyer, journalist, Marine Corps officer and religious minister. He served as US government agent for the first American Colonization Society expedition to Africa. The expedition was struck down by African fever and Bacon sought help from a nearby British settlement. He died from exhaustion and placed the expedition's supplies into the charge of Daniel Coker.

== Early life ==
Samuel Bacon was born on July 22, 1781, in Sturbridge, Massachusetts, to Ephraim Bacon and Hannah Chamberlin. He was the youngest of nine siblings and attended school at Leicester, Massachusetts. Bacon was due to attend Harvard College in 1804 but illness prevented him from taking up his place until September 1806. After graduating and recovering his health he became editor of the National Aegis in Worcester, Pennsylvania. Bacon left this post soon afterwards and moved to Philadelphia in December 1809. He went on to practice law in York, Carlisle and Shippensburg in Pennsylvania.

Bacon then moved to Lancaster, Pennsylvania, where he opened a successful school and, from May to December 1810, edited the weekly Hive newspaper. Bacon later accepted an offer from York College of Pennsylvania to purchase the school.

== Marine Corps ==
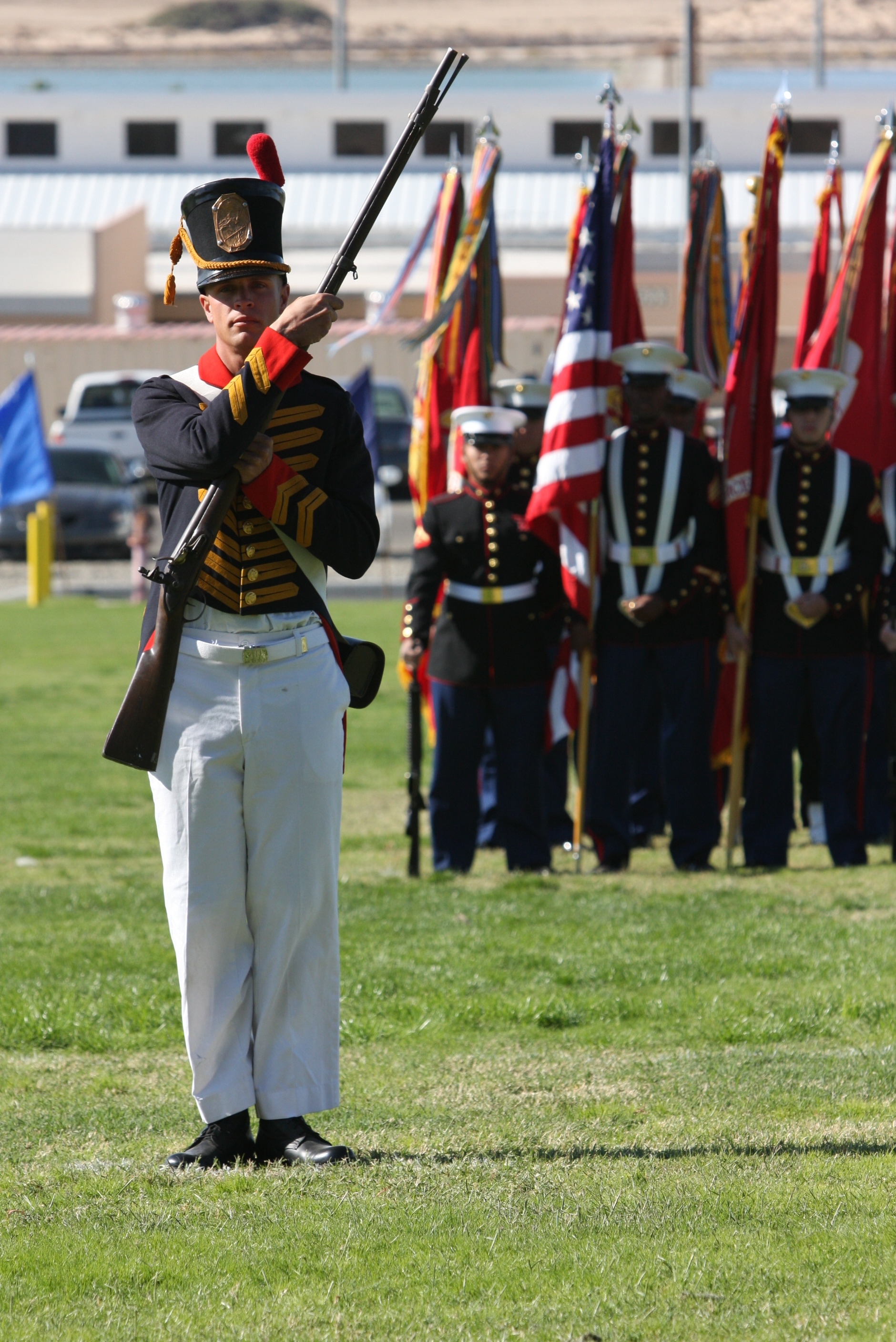
Soldier (left) dressed as 1812 US Marine

Bacon became interested in the United States Marine Corps through an acquaintance in Lancaster who was an officer in the corps. In early 1812 Bacon applied to President James Madison for a commission and gave up the opportunity to become head of York College when he was accepted on 14 April. He was granted a 6-month furlough before joining to settle his affairs at the college.

The War of 1812 brought about a rapid expansion of the corps and Bacon was rapidly promoted, becoming a first lieutenant on 8 July, while still on leave. The corps commandant Franklin Wharton pressed Bacon to end his furlough early and Bacon reported to the headquarters in Washington, D.C., in October 1812.

On 1 March 1813 Bacon was sent to New York as commander of the marines on board the USS Argus, but this order was rescinded just five days later as the Argus' commander desired only a sergeant to command his marines. Bacon served on several court-martial panels and as a recruiter in New York and Peekskill.

Wharton appointed Bacon as quartermaster of the Marine Corps on 1 September 1813 and he held this position until 30 April 1815, seeing out the remainder of the war. At around the time of his appointment Bacon engaged in a duel with a fellow marine officer and was wounded badly in the thigh, which rendered him unable to carry out his duties for some weeks. He married Anna Mary Barnitz on 31 May 1814 at York and on 18 June was promoted to captain. Bacon seems to have played a logistics role in support of Commodore Joshua Barney's naval forces in defence of Washington, D.C.

Bacon was admitted to the bar in Washington, D.C., on 9 January 1815 and his son was born in March that year. Bacon, frustrated with the non-combatant nature of his work, resigned as quartermaster on 30 April. Wharton assigned him to recruiting duty in York, where Bacon began practising law in his spare time.

== Law and religion ==
Bacon's wife died on 28 August 1815 and in November he resigned his commission to concentrate on his law practice. He was soon appointed deputy attorney for the York and Adams counties district court and elected major in the state militia. Bacon became religious, joining the German Lutheran Church in May 1817 but soon after joined the Episcopal Church. He also established at least 26 Sunday schools in York County.

On 9 September 1818 he wrote to President James Monroe to recommend Samuel Miller for the position of commandant of the Marine Corps. Bacon was ordained as a deacon in the Episcopal Church by William White on 5 September 1819 and later became a priest of the church.

== African expedition ==
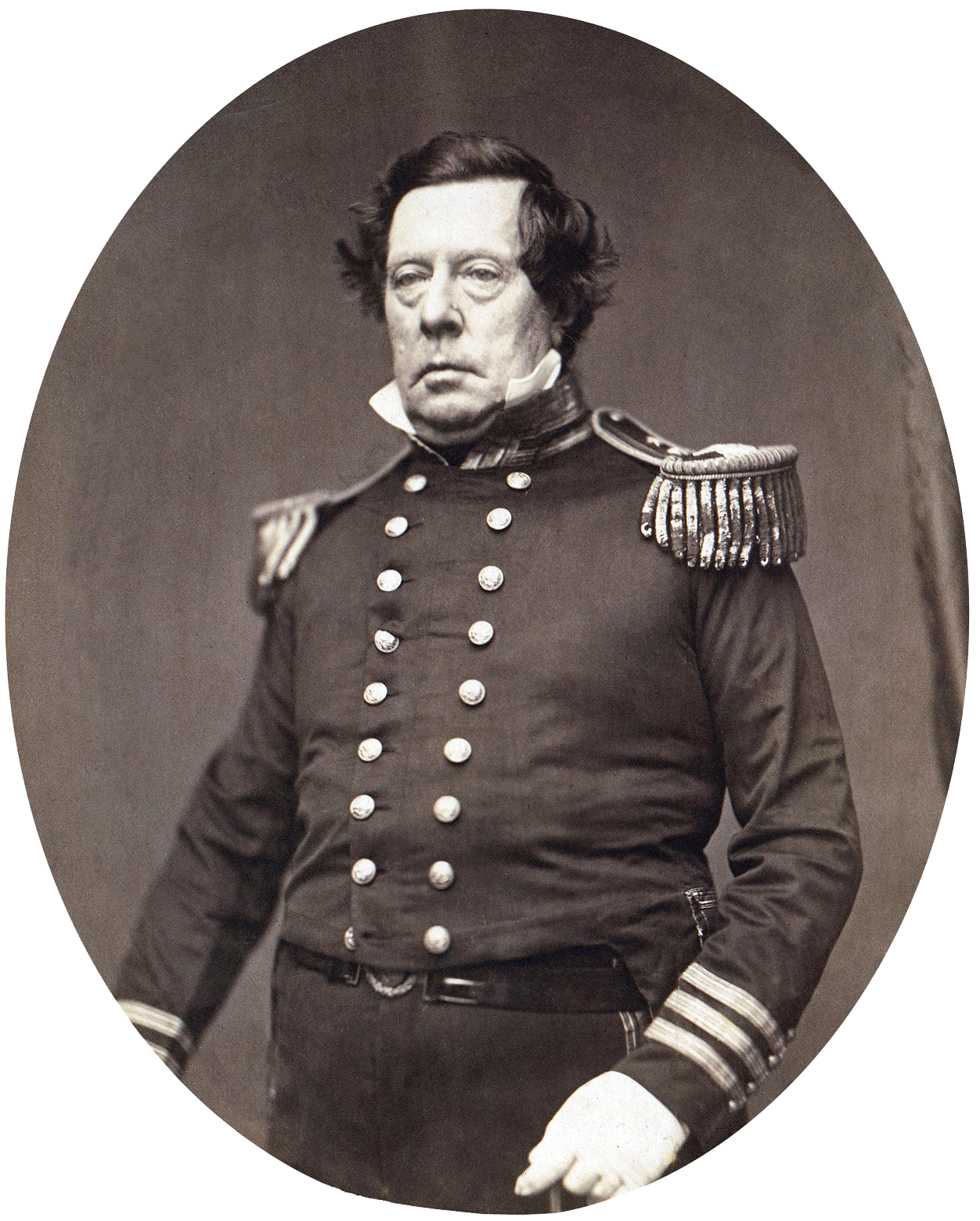
Matthew C. Perry

Bacon was appointed principal government agent for the first American Colonization Society (ACS) expedition to Africa. The US government selected Bacon on the advice of the ACS, who planned to establish a colony on the West coast of Africa. The expedition comprised 86 persons, of whom two-thirds were women.

Bacon chartered the merchantman Elizabeth as a transport and supply ship and used government funds to procure supplies sufficient for 300 men for a year and to hire carpenters and labourers. The expedition boarded the Elizabeth at New York on January 3, 1820, but the ship was confined to the harbour until February 6 by ice. The US Navy sixth-rate Cyane was supposed to escort the Elizabeth but was detained by ice for a further 4 days and did not catch up with the expedition until they reached Africa.

The expedition landed at Sherbro Island, Sierra Leone in March 1820 and established a temporary camp there ahead of procuring a permanent site on the mainland. Bacon asked the officers of the Cyane to assist with selecting land for the colony and its first lieutenant, Matthew C. Perry, selected a site at Cape Mersurado. However by the time the Cyane returned to Sherbro at the end of April the majority of colonists had died of African fever. The blame for this was laid on the site chosen for the temporary camp which was on marshy ground, surrounded by dense vegetation and whose only water source was brackish.

Bacon became ill too on April 19 and was too sick to make journal entries from the 23rd. On the 28th, a schooner from the Sierra Leone colony visited and two British officials inspected the debilitated settlement. They were asked for aid but refused and would not take Bacon on to their ship. He pursued them in an open boat but the oarsmen could not catch up. They continued on to the Plantain Islands and then spent another day on the water before landing at Cape Shilling where the superintendent of the British station, Captain William Randle, gave him shelter and aid. The fever and exposure to the sun was too severe though and he expired early on the morning of May 2. He was buried at Cape Shilling's church on the same day.

Following the failure of the expedition a second venture was approved by President James Monroe in 1821, for which Bacon's brother Ephraim served as a government agent.
