= York Island (Sierra Leone) =

Island in Sierra Leone

Coordinates: 7°32′N 12°28′W

York Island is an island in Sierra Leone. It is a small island located 2 km (1.2 mi) to the east of Bonthe, Sherbro Island. It is part of the Bonthe Island Municipality.

The principal settlement on York Island is York, a small fishing village. The population is in decline, something which is attributed to the designation of the Sherbro River as a Marine Protected Area. This has had a negative impact on the livelihoods of the inhabitants who are now unable to build canoes of sufficient size to make sea fishing safe and viable.

== History ==
York Island was rented from a Bulom King by the English Royal Africa Company, who built a factory for use in the slave trade on the island. This was fortified with stone walls and equipped with cannon. Thomas Corker's career took off following his appointment as chief agent on York Island.
