= Charles Heddle =

Scottish-born businessman (1812–1889)

Charles William Maxwell Heddle (c. 1812 – 29 April 1889 Cannes) was a Scottish-Sierra Leonian businessman and shipowner. In 1870 he retired to France where he died in 1889.

Born in Sierra Leone in about 1812, Charles was the illegitimate son of John Heddle from Kirkwall and Sophy Bouchier of Sierra Leone. His father died before he was born. Charles was educated in Kirkwall and at the Dollar Academy and in Edinburgh. He first set up in business in Banjul (Bathurst) in the Gambia in 1834. He returned to Sierra Leone a few years later. Here he helped his uncle Robert Heddle grow his business into one of the most successful businesses in the country. The company branched out from trading in peanuts to owning ships and running a shipping company.

Charles Heddle bought Heddle's Farm on 23 April 1859. He subsequently sold it to the government.

He was a cousin of Matthew Forster Heddle.
