= Denver Depression of 1893 =

Period of economic downturn in Denver, Colorado

The Denver Depression of 1893 was the economic depression of Denver, Colorado, that began in 1893 after the rapid drop in the price of silver and lasted for several years.

== Causes ==
With the Coinage Act of 1873, bimetallism was disestablished by Congress and gold was established as the standard. Despite this, the city of Denver, Colorado enjoyed boomtown growth during the late 19th century after the discovery and development of numerous silver mines and the passage of first the Bland–Allison Act of 1878 and then the Sherman Silver Purchase Act of 1890, both of which required the U.S. government to purchase millions of ounces of silver each year. As one historian of the period noted, “Almost all economic pursuits in the state were tied in one way or another to the mining industry; consequently, almost every Colorado resident had a vested interest in its success.” But whereas the silver standard enabled western rural farmers and miners to pay off their debts, bankers in the east were losing money because the circulation of silver was leading to a decline in the value of gold-based money as investors turned in the new silver notes for gold dollars (see also Free silver, silverites). In 1893, those in the west lost the battle, as United States President Grover Cleveland oversaw the repeal of the Sherman Silver Purchase Act. This caused the prices of silver to fall, and the prices of silver continued to fall further due to an overabundance of the metal when silver was struck in Leadville and in the San Juan Mountains.

Denver was already suffering economically due to several successive years of droughts and harsh winters that had hurt the agricultural industry. Agricultural distress, coupled with the withdrawal of foreign investors and the over-expansion of the silver mining industries, led Denver to experience its first economic depression.

== Effects ==
The collapse of the silver market beginning in 1893 dropped the price of silver from 83 cents to 62 cents an ounce. Mining companies dropped their wages, yet as one historian reports, due to the overabundance of workers in the area, “employers could easily replace workers unwilling to accept pay cuts.” Then, as the silver mines began to close due to the continued drop in silver prices, unemployed miners and other workers from the Colorado mountains flooded into Denver in hopes of finding work. Seeking to address the growing tensions in Denver, politicians friendly with the silver cause met in Denver on July 12, 1893, to lend support against the repealing of the Sherman Silver Act, but to no avail. People began to withdraw their money from banks in a panic as the price of silver dropped. This caused numerous banks to collapse, as at this point there was no federal insurance to support the money in the banks. Many people in the west thus lost their life savings. And as Denver banks closed, real estate values dropped, smelters stopped working, and the Denver tramways had trouble getting people to ride and pay their fares.

Unfortunately, the miners coming into Denver found no jobs and no help. Rescue missions initially provided tents and food, but they could not keep up with the growing number of unemployed persons in the city, and eventually they could only provide for women and children. The People's Tabernacle was one of the largest of such efforts that had provided care for the sick. They offered a free dispensary, gave away winter clothing, and offered a free bathhouse, classes in sewing, shelter for the homeless, and medical attention for prostitutes, but they were similarly forced to limit aid to people who had been living in the city for more than 60 days.

The depression also exacerbated existing prejudices. American Protective Association (APA) found jobs for Protestants, for example, by firing Catholics. This led 10,000 Denverites to belong to the APA after the depression started. In response, Catholic Reverend Thomas Malone infiltrated the APA with spies, seeking to embarrass its members and to weaken the party.

Several organizations formed community gardens as an attempt to help ease the shortage of food. By the fall of 1893, a tent city had appeared at Riverfront Park along the South Platte River. The chamber of commerce gave a gift of lumber to the homeless camped in the tent city, apparently in hopes that they would build rafts and float away. During this time 450 desperate Coxeyites abandoned their rafts in La Salle and hijacked a train to Julesburg where they were stopped by a posse.

By September 1893, the Colorado Bureau of Labor Statistics reported that 377 businesses had failed, 435 mines had closed, and 45,000 people were out of work.

Because of the city's inability to take care of the jobless, some train companies began offering reduced or free fares for people wanting to travel from Denver. One railroad, for instance, lowered fares to $6 on the Denver to Missouri River route. This effort contributed to the exodus from the city, and Denver's population dropped from 106,000 in 1890 to 90,000 in 1895.

The only project that was not slowed during the depression was the building of the Colorado State Capitol. This construction effort provided jobs during the crisis, both for those working on the building itself and in the mines that could extract the marble that was chosen in lieu of hardwood for flooring. As one historian of the time noted, “Governor Davis Waite, the board’s chairman, remained dedicated to providing jobs for the Coloradoans by using native materials as much as possible”

In 1895, The Festival of Mountain and Plain was established by Chamber of Commerce to raise peoples' spirits in a manner comparable to New Orleans' Mardi Gras. During the festival people marched “inside the block long silver serpent” that was meant to celebrate the city's silver heritage, singing, “We spring, we sprawl, We caper, we crawl, With vesture of changeable hue. We slidingly slink, as we near the brink Of our subterranean abyss.” Department stores ran sales during the festival, and festival organizers arranged for opportunities that enabled tourists to take pictures of Ute Indians for a fee and to see a Broadway show.

=== Politics ===
With the rising opposition to the Republican efforts that had supported the gold standard that had contributed to the crash of the silver industry, the Populist political party easily won the Colorado statehouse in 1893, and Davis Hanson Waite was elected to the governorship.

Governor Waite tried to overturn the corruption in Denver in 1894 by removing police and fire commissioners that he believed were shielding the gamblers and prostitutes that he believed were resulting from and also worsening the depression. Corrupt officials including the infamous Soapy Smith and his colleagues barricaded themselves in the city hall in response, and militiamen were sent to remove them. Federal intervention prevented an all out war and the Colorado Supreme Court ruled in favor of the governor and stated that the governor could remove commissioners.

Waite also suggested that Colorado should mint its own money by buying the silver the state produced and shipping it to Mexico to be minted into “Fandango Dollars.” As Waite stated, “it is better, infinitely better, that blood should flow to the horses’ bridles rather than our national liberties should be destroyed.” The public was not receptive to the idea, however, and in 1894 Albert McIntire defeated Waite for governorship.

=== People ===
Many of Colorado's most renowned residents of the day suffered as a result of Denver's depression of 1893:

- Henry Brown, owner of Brown Palace Hotel, spent his last years fighting off creditors who were trying to take over his hotel.
- John Evans lost his title of the Railroad Building at 15th and Larimer.
- Horace Tabor lost everything in the silver collapse, representing a monumental reversal of fortune given that Tabor had once possessed one of the largest fortunes out of Colorado mines, and had overseen a substantial number of the state's mines and real estate titles. Tabor was only saved from destitution in 1898 by his appointment to Postmaster, a position he held until he died 1899.
- Baby Doe Tabor, the scandal-burdened widow of Horace Tabor, survived her husband by about thirty years but never recovered from the loss of the family fortune. She eventually froze to death in a cabin adjacent to one of the Tabors' best-known silver mines.
- William Lang, architect of Molly Brown House, became an alcoholic during the depression, and was hit and killed by a train in Illinois.
- Francis Schlatter, who gained notoriety for appearing as a bearded “Christ-like figure” in the summer of 1895 after similar stints in Denver for several months in 1892, had supposedly performed many free miracles and thousands of people lined the streets to be touched by him during that summer and fall. Schlatter disappeared in November 1895 leaving this note: “My mission is finished. Father takes me away. Goodbye. Francis Schlatter.”
- An unnamed Italian bartender was put in jail for killing a man who could not pay the 5 cents for his beer. An angry mob broke into the jail, dragged the bartender out, hung him, shot him and dragged his body through the streets.

== See also ==
- Black Friday (1869)—also referred to as the Gold Panic of 1869
- Panic of 1893

== Bibliography ==
- Everett, Derek R: “The Colorado State Capitol: History, Politics, Preservation.” University Press of Colorado: Boulder, 2005.
- Ubbelohde, Carl, Maxine Benson, and Duane A. Smith. eds: “A Colorado History." Pruett Publishing Company: Boulder, 1982.
- Leonard, Stephen J. and Thomas J. Noel: “Denver: Mining Camp to Metropolis.” University Press of Colorado: Niwot, 1990.
- Steeples, Douglas and David O. Whitten: “Democracy in Desperation: The Depression of 1893.” Greenwood Press: Westport, 1998.
- Cotton, Jean. "The Silver Crash of 1893: Lore, Legend and Fact.” Web. 17 Feb 2010. <https://web.archive.org/web/20130927133514/http://www.ellensplace.net/hcg_fac8.html>.
