= King James Cleveland =

King in Sierra Leone

King James Cleveland (1754 – 1791) was King of the Banana Islands in Sierra Leone. He was active as a slave trader.

== Early life and education ==
James Cleveland was born to William Clevland, an Anglo-Scot, and Ndamba, a Kissi woman, on the Banana Islands off Sierra Leone. His father had been working as a trader for the Royal African Company. His ship went aground off the Banana Islands in 1730. Settling there with other survivors, his father appointed himself as king. William Clevland sent his son James to school in Liverpool, England.

== Political power ==
When Cleveland returned to Sierra Leone, the young man was initiated into the Poro society of men in the Banana Islands. Through the Poro, he recruited an army with which to attack his rival Charles Caulker, whom he killed and decapitated.

Cleveland married a woman of the Caulker family, and had a son, William, named after James' father. However, when James died, the succession of his son was contested by Stephen Caulker.

William Cleveland served as king from 1791 to 1797, when he was killed by Caulker. Also the mixed-race descendant of an English trader and an African woman of high rank, Caulker and his family established a powerful political dynasty in Sierra Leone, becoming involved in mainland affairs.

James Cleveland and his wife also had a daughter, who died shortly after her marriage to Henry Smeathman.
