= Daniel Francis (footballer, born 2002) =

Sierra Leone international footballer

Personal information
- Date of birth: 10 July 2002 (age 24)
- Place of birth: Bradford, England
- Height: 1.74 m (5 ft 9 in)
- Position: Left-back

Youth career
- Bradford City

Senior career*
Years	Team	Apps	(Gls)
2021–2022	Rot Weiss Ahlen	46	(0)
2023	KFC Uerdingen 05	17	(0)
2023–2024	TuS Bövinghausen	3	(0)
2024–2025	Bradford (Park Avenue)	25	(4)

International career^{‡}
2021–	Sierra Leone	2	(0)
- * Club domestic league appearances and goals as of 12:19, 28 January 2025 (UTC) ‡ National team caps and goals as of 09:14, 19 June 2023 (UTC)

Daniel Francis (born 10 July 2002) is a professional footballer who plays as a left-back. Born in England, he plays for the Sierra Leone national team.

== Professional career ==
A youth product of Bradford City, Francis transferred to the German club Rot Weiss Ahlen in 2020 and began his senior career in the Regionalliga.

In July 2024, Francis returned to England, joining Northern Premier League Division One East club Bradford (Park Avenue). He departed the club in January 2025 in order to pursue a new career in Germany.

== International career ==
Francis was born in England to a Sierra Leonean Sherbro father and German mother. He made his debut with the Sierra Leone national team in a friendly 0–0 tie with Ethiopia on 26 August 2021.
