= Rufus Clark =

American pioneer and businessman (1822–1910)

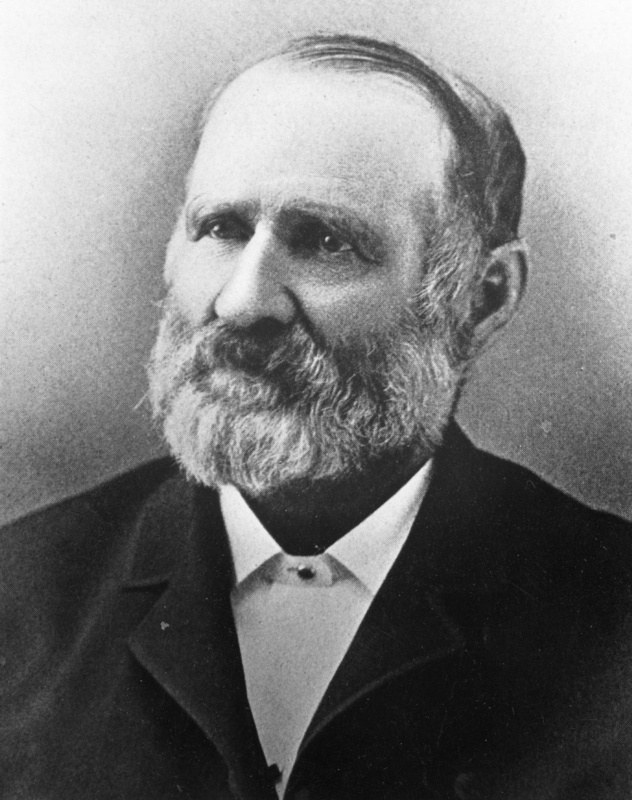
- Born: December 4, 1822; Coventry, Connecticut, U.S.
- Died: October 14, 1910 (aged 87); Denver, Colorado, U.S.
- Resting place: Riverside Cemetery, Denver County, Colorado
- Other names: Potato Clark; Potato King of Colorado; Dad Clark
- Occupations: American pioneer; businessman; politician; community leader
- Years active: 1849–1899
- Known for: Farming
- Spouses: Mary Pomeroy (before 1854); Lucinda Watts (m. 1854; died 1861)
- Children: 5

Rufus Clark (December 4, 1822 – October 14, 1910 (Note: Historian Steve Fisher gave Clark's birth year as 1834. At Clark's death in October 1910, Clark's age was reported by the Rocky Mountain News as 88 years.)), also known both as Potato Clark and Dad Clark, was an American pioneer, businessman, politician, and community leader who was dubbed the "Potato King of Colorado". Born in Connecticut, Clark spent time at sea and searching for gold in Australia and California before migrating to Denver from Iowa in 1859 with his second wife and their child during the Pike's Peak Gold Rush. Clark established a 160-acre farm along the South Platte River, acquiring a fortune and substantial landholdings from selling potatoes to miners and Denverites. After his second wife died in 1861, he was elected to the Colorado territorial legislature in 1864 for a single term.

After experiencing a conversion following a Denver tent revival by the United Brethren, Clark quit drinking, having struggled with alcoholism prior. Both before and after his conversion, he spent much of his wealth on charitable ventures, including sponsoring a United Brethren school at Shenge in modern-day Sierra Leone, providing relief funds after the Great Chicago Fire, and funding the construction of a Salvation Army building. Clark was involved in the establishment of the town of South Denver, donating land to the University of Denver to establish the dry University Park Colony at the site. Clark donated land to establish the Clark Colony, supplied with water by the Castlewood Dam. Clark died in 1910 and was survived by his daughter and third wife. He left money to support his charitable ventures. Dad Clark Park in Highlands Ranch and Dad Clark Gulch are named in his honor.

== Early life and career ==
Rufus Clark was born on December 4, 1822, in Coventry, Connecticut, as the youngest child of Milton and Anna (née Dimmick) Clark. The Clark family had four sons—including Rufus—and one daughter; the daughter would die in childhood. Milton Clark was a descendent of Congregationalist minister Josiah Clark, who had settled in Windsor Locks, Connecticut, after sailing aboard the Mayflower. Milton, a War of 1812 veteran and Tolland County farmer, was also born in Coventry; his wife Anna was the daughter of a land-owning farming family in Tolland County.

After farming in Farmington, Connecticut, for 18 months, Rufus Clark went to sea in 1838. In 1839, he joined a whaling voyage aboard the ship Delphos that spent 17 months at sea, primarily in the South Atlantic with a stop in Australia. After a whaling venture in the Indian Ocean, he became second mate of the Portland of Sag Harbor and then, in 1848, chief mate of the Columbia. Aboard the Columbia, he passed through the Bering Strait into the Arctic Ocean. With news of the California Gold Rush, Clark was discharged from the Columbia at the end of the unsuccessful voyage and travelled to the California gold mines.

Clark began a voyage for Australia in 1852, during which he was shipwrecked on the Navigator Islands and was picked up by an Auckland-bound ship. After working in gold mines near Sydney, he walked the 400 miles to Melbourne and worked in the mines there for 18 months. He returned to the United States in 1854 and visited Connecticut. That year, the penniless Clark moved to Taylor County, Iowa, where he built a sawmill and married Lucinda Watts. Sometime prior, he had been married to Mary Pomeroy of New York.

== Colorado pioneer and convert ==
Rufus and Lucinda Clark, with their daughter Mary, travelled by ox train to Denver in April 1859 during the Pike's Peak Gold Rush, arriving July 11. Clark homesteaded 160 acres in Overland Park along the South Platte River, near the site where Montana City had stood the year before. Here, he grew vegetables to feed the growing number of Denverites. His success—including the delivery of $1,500 of potatoes to Denver in a single day—soon earned him the title of "Potato King of Colorado". By 1860, he was the "principal farmer" in Denver. Lucinda died in Denver in 1861. Already a heavy drinker, Clark's alcoholism worsened with his second wife's death.

Clark was converted at a Denver tent revival by the United Brethren, dissuading him from further alcohol consumption. Prior to the conversion and afterwards, he was engaged in a variety of charitable ventures. After this, he branched his business ventures into real estate, acquiring almost 20,000 acres in what is now Greenwood Village and Cherry Hills Village.

Though not a Methodist, Clark was approached by the Methodist Episcopal Church in 1884 about supporting the University of Denver's move from downtown Denver and offered 40 acres of his land as a donation of land in what was then Arapahoe County. After raising the donation to 80 acres of his property and securing commitments in property and money from other landowners in the area, the university accepted Clark's offer. An additional 320 acres was purchased adjacent to Clark's donation for $75 an acre in 1886, bringing the university's holdings in the area to 400 acres. Clark conditioned this donation on the premises that the community would be laid out in a tree-lined grid and that the sale and production of alcohol would be prohibited, thereby avoiding replicating Denver's "moral and environmental pollution". This prohibition remains enforced in some modern home mortgages in the area, retaining covenants that prohibiting alcohol production and sale on-property. In portions of South Denver not gifted by Clark, the town priced liquor licenses at $3,500 per year, pricing out most alcohol-related ventures.

A municipal incorporation effort was organized by Clark, James Fleming, and Avery Gallup in early 1886 at the new university site of South Denver in response to the saloons, dance halls, and gambling establishments near a racetrack in Denver's Overland Park, to allow the area to legally enforce anti-vice laws. With help from others, the group created a petition and approached the 150 residents of the area in search of the 30 votes needed to establish the community. The Arapahoe County court declared South Denver an incorporated town on August 9, 1886. Fleming was elected mayor, Gallup was elected as one of five trustees, and Clark was elected treasurer in the September 4 city election; each were elected for a one-year term and presented a salary of $1 per term. Fleming and Clark were reelected to their posts on April 1, 1887.

In 1899, Clark sold 2,050 lots in Evanston to the University of Denver for $110,000. The lots had been appraised at a value of $250,000; Clark stipulated that these lots be sold for a profit. Clark sold his remaining share of Evanston to William C. Johnston for $60,000 the same year. Clark used the proceeds from these sales to alleviate some of the University of Denver's debts and to rebuild a theological school named for Clark and his wife in Shenge, Sierra Leone. Despite Johnston's efforts to revive the area as an "elite, cultured university town", the concept of Evanston becoming a "Methodist colony" soon died.

== Legacy ==
Clark's 1859 farm was located on what is now the Highlands Ranch Golf Club. Dad Clark Gulch along the High Line Canal and Highlands Ranch's Dad Clark Park and Dad Clark Drive are all named in his honor. There is a community garden known as the "Potato Patch" in Dad Clark Park.

Clark may have served as the inspiration for the character Hans "Potato" Brumbaugh in James A. Michener's novel Centennial.
