= Daniel Coker =

African-American former slave and Methodist minister

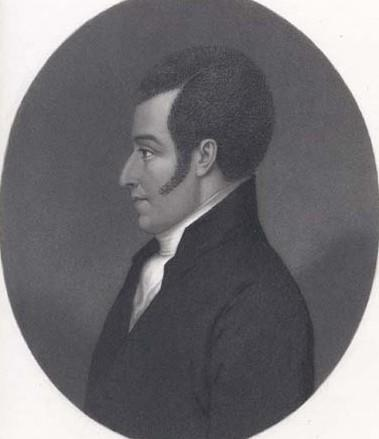
Daniel Coker, African-American missionary to Sierra Leone, 1820

Daniel Coker (1780–1846), born Isaac Wright, was an African American of mixed race from Baltimore, Maryland. Born a slave, after he gained his freedom, he became a Methodist minister in 1802. He wrote one of the few pamphlets published in the South that protested against slavery and supported abolition. In 1816, he helped found the African Methodist Episcopal Church, the first independent black denomination in the United States, at its first national convention in Philadelphia.

In 1820, Coker took his family and immigrated to the British colony of Sierra Leone, where he was the first Methodist missionary from a Western nation. There Coker founded the West Africa Methodist Church.

== Early life ==
He was born into slavery as Isaac Wright in 1780 in Baltimore, or Frederick County, Maryland, to Susan Coker, a white woman, and Edward Wright, an enslaved African American. Under a 1664 Maryland slave law, Wright was considered enslaved because his father was enslaved. (Another source said that his mother was an enslaved black and his father white.)

Beginning in the colonial period, Maryland had added restrictions on unions between white women and enslaved Black people. Under a 1692 Maryland law, white women who had children with enslaved people would be punished by being sold as indentured servants for seven years and binding their mixed-race children to serve indentures until the age of twenty-one if the woman was married to the enslaved person, and until age thirty-one if she was not married to the father.(Such interracial marriages were later prohibited by law.) Growing up in a household with his white Coker half-brothers, Wright attended primary school with them, serving as their valet. A white half-brother was said to have refused to go to school without him.

As a teenager, Wright escaped to New York. There, he changed his name to Daniel Coker and joined the Methodist Episcopal Church. Coker received a license to preach from Francis Asbury, a British missionary who had immigrated to the United States and planted numerous frontier churches during his career. He also rode large circuits to minister to people on the frontier.

Coker later returned to Baltimore. For a time, he passed as his white half-brother. Friends helped him purchase his freedom from his enslaver to secure his legal status. As a free man of color, he could teach at a local school for black children. Baltimore was a center of a growing population of free people of color, including several individuals manumitted after the Revolutionary War.

== Methodist minister ==
In 1802, Francis Asbury ordained Coker as a deacon in the Methodist Episcopal Church. Coker actively opposed slavery and wrote pamphlets in protest. In 1810, he wrote and published the pamphlet Dialogue between a Virginian and an African minister, described by historian and critic Dorothy Porter as resembling a "scholastic dialogue". It is noted for its literary quality and because it was one of the few protest pamphlets "written and published in the slaveholding South."

While working at Sharp Street Church, Coker began to advocate for black Methodists to withdraw from the white-dominated church. He founded the African Bethel Church, which later became known as Bethel A.M.E. Church.

In 1807, Coker founded the Bethel Charity School for Black children. One of his students was William J. Watkins, who became an abolitionist and opposed the proposed resettlement of free American blacks in Africa. Coker himself later participated in such colonization.

In 1816, Coker traveled to Philadelphia, where he represented his church and collaborated with Richard Allen of that city in organizing the national African Methodist Episcopal Church. It was founded by several congregations, mostly in the mid-Atlantic region, as the first independent black denomination in the United States. The delegates elected Coker as the first bishop, but he deferred to Allen. The latter minister had founded the first AME Church in Philadelphia, known as Mother Bethel A.M.E. Church, and encouraged the planting of new congregations in the mid-Atlantic region. Coker represented Bethel A.M.E. Church (founded 1787/1797) in Baltimore.

Coker encountered difficulties after his return to Baltimore. In 1818, church elders dismissed him from the Connection because of "undisclosed charges"; the following year, he was readmitted but could preach only with the approval of a local minister. Although he continued teaching, he could not support his family. In 1820, he decided to emigrate with his family as a missionary to Africa under the aegis of the American Colonization Society (ACS).

== Emigration to western Africa ==
Early in 1820, Daniel Coker sailed for Africa on board the Elizabeth. He was among 86 African-American emigrants assisted by the ACS. Made up of various leaders from the northern and southern United States, the ACS advocated resettling free African Americans in West Africa. Both enslavers and some abolitionists supported the enterprise, the former believing that free people of color threatened the stability of the southern slave society.

The passengers on the Elizabeth were the first African-American settlers of the Colony of Liberia, a private colony organized by the ACS with financial support from the United States government.

The ACS planned to settle a colony at Sherbro Island, now within Sierra Leone, which was then a British colony. The newcomers were not used to the local diseases and quickly became ill. The area was swampy, resulting in many mosquitoes that carried disease. All but one of the twelve white colonists and one-third of the African Americans died, including three of the four missionaries. Just before dying, the expedition's leader, Samuel Bacon, asked Coker to take charge of the venture. He helped the remaining colonists get through their despair and survive.

Coker led the group to seek another location on the mainland. He and his family settled in Hastings, Sierra Leone, a newly founded village about 15 miles from the first settlement of Freetown. It was intended for Liberated Africans freed by the British Navy from illegal slave ships, as Britain and the United States had banned the transatlantic slave trade. Hastings was one of several new villages developed by the Church Missionary Society, which was active in the colony. Coker became the patriarch of a prominent Creole family, the Cokers. Coker's son, Daniel Coker Jr., became a leader in the town of Freetown. Coker descendants still reside in Freetown and are among the prominent Creole families. Other members of the expedition settled in what became Liberia.

In 1891 Henry McNeal Turner, the 12th bishop of the A.M.E. Church, elaborated on Coker's achievements, writing,

"It would seem, from all I can learn, that Coker played a prominent part in the early settlement of Liberia. The first Methodist Church established here was the African M. E. Church; but by whom established I cannot say. Tradition says it was afterward sold out to the M. E. Church. Besides the probability of Rev. Daniel Coker's having established our church here, he also played a mighty part among the early settlers of Sierra Leone. His children and grandchildren are found there to-day."

== See also ==
- Liberia
- Sierra Leone
- Mother Bethel A.M.E. Church
- Sharp Street Memorial United Methodist Church and Community House
- Paul Cuffe
- Henry McNeal Turner
- David Brion Davis
- Lott Cary
