= Charles Caulker =

Chief of the Bumpe Chiefdom from 1832 to 1842

Charles Caulker (died 1842) was chief of the Bumpe Chiefdom from 1832 to 1842, in the colony of Sierra Leone.

Also known as Ba Charley, he had succeeded his brother Thomas Kon Tham in 1832.
