= Banana Islands =

Group of islands part of Sierra Leone

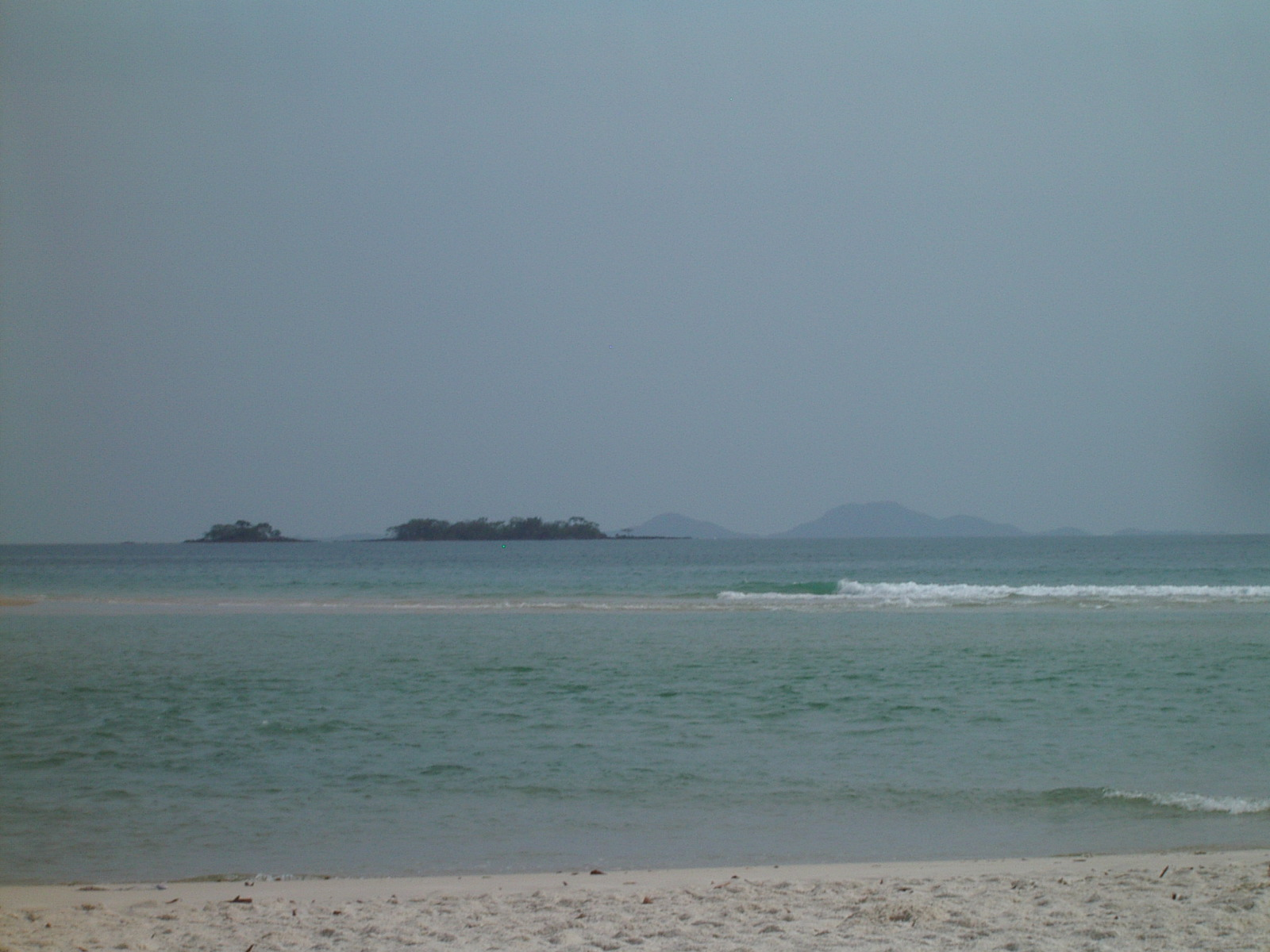
- The Banana Islands as seen from Yawri Bay

- Location in Sierra Leone
- Interactive map of Banana Islands

Geography
- Location: Atlantic Ocean
- Coordinates: 8°07′N 13°13′W
- Total islands: 3

Administration
- Sierra Leone
- Area: Western Area

Demographics
- Population: c. 900

The Banana Islands are a group of islands that lie off the coast of Yawri Bay, south west of the Freetown Peninsula in the Western Area of Sierra Leone.

Three islands make up the Banana Islands: Dublin and Ricketts are linked by a stone causeway. The third, Mes-Meheux, is the smallest and is uninhabited. Dublin Island is known for its beaches, while Ricketts Island is best known for its forests.

The Banana Islands are accessible only by boat, ferry or helicopter. The major industries in the Banana Islands are fishing and tourism.

== History ==
=== Diemermeer ===
In 1747 the Diemermeer, an East Indiaman belonging to the Dutch East India Company was wrecked here.

=== The Clevlands ===
William Clevland and a group of fellow sailors were shipwrecked on the islands, and Clevland took the opportunity to declare himself king. This claim was cemented by his marriage to Ndamba, a Kissi woman. During the late 1700s, disputes broke into deep violence between the Clevelands of the Banana Islands and the Caulkers of the Plantain Islands. This ended in the 1800s, when the Caulkers finally succeeded in taking both sets of islands.

== Ricketts and Dublin ==
Dublin and Ricketts Islands have a combined population of about 900 people. The two islands are connected by a spit of sand that is underwater at high tide. A stone bridge connects the path between the two islands' villages of Dublin and Ricketts, located on the coast facing the Western Peninsula.

The islands were visited in the 17th century and perhaps earlier by Portuguese sailors. They were settled in the late 18th and 19th centuries by recaptives (freed slaves), mostly from the Americas. Their descendants make up most of the population of the islands today.

== Mes-Meheux ==
Mes-Meheux is the smallest of the three islands. It is uninhabited and is owned by an eco-tourist business who promote it as an "adventure tourism destination".

== Activities ==
Shipwrecks lie off the coast, and in one can be found cannons amongst the ruin and coral. On the northern tip of Dublin Island the ruins of an 1881 church as well as an old slave dock can be found. It is advised that visitors should pay their respects to the tribal chief before wandering around the islands.

Tourist infrastructure exists only in the northern part of the island. Daltons Banana Guest House or the Banana Island Chalets can arrange transportation to the islands from the nearby town of Kent.

== See also ==
- King James Cleveland
- Caulker family of Sierra Leone

== Bibliography ==
- Manson K. & Knight J. (2009) Sierra Leone Chalfont St Peter: Bradt Travel Guides.
