= Charles B. Caulker =

Sierra Leonean politician

Charles B. Caulker is Paramount Chief of Bumpe Chiefdom, Moyamba District, Southern Province, Sierra Leone.

In April 2016, Caulker made a trip to the United States where he made speeches about his plans to support and protect the children of Bumpe.
