= Yawri Bay =

Bay on the coast of Sierra Leone

- Location in Sierra Leone
- Coordinates: 8°2′N 13°5′W
- Ocean/sea sources: Atlantic Ocean
- Basin countries: Sierra Leone
- Max. length: 22 km (14 mi)
- Max. width: 29 km (18 mi)
- Islands: Banana Islands
- Settlements: Tumbu

Yawri Bay is a bay on the coast of Sierra Leone on the Atlantic Ocean.

== Geography ==
Yawri Bay opens to the south-west and is located about 25 km to the south of Freetown. The Banana Islands —including Dublin Island, Ricketts Island and Wolf Rock— as well as Mes-Meheux close to the headland, are located off the north-western point enclosing the bay.

=== Environment ===
The bay is a shallow coastal wetland with sheltered waters and some 60 km of foreshore. It has 9,000 ha of intertidal mudflats, backed by 25,000 ha of mangrove swamps interlaced with tidal creeks. The site has been designated an Important Bird Area (IBA) by BirdLife International because it supports significant populations of lesser flamingos, western reef egrets, pink-backed and great white pelicans, Eurasian oystercatchers, pied avocets, Eurasian curlews, bar-tailed and black-tailed godwits, red knots, curlew sandpipers, little terns and Timneh parrots.
