= Shenge =

Community in Sierra Leone

- Location in Sierra Leone
- Coordinates: 7°54′0″N 12°56′0″W
- Country: Sierra Leone
- Province: Southern Province
- District: Moyamba District
- Chiefdom: Kagboro Chiefdom
- Time zone: UTC-5 (GMT)

Shenge (also spelled Shengge) is a coastal fishing town along the Atlantic Ocean in Moyamba District, Southern Province, Sierra Leone. Shenge is the seat of the Kagboro Chiefdom, part of the third level of administration. The dense coastal jungle has prevented development of a good road network, and the Shenge is still most easily reached by boat. The local small fishing and passenger boats that travel among the coastal towns are known as pampas in Sierra Leone.

The population of Shenge is ethnically very diverse, with no single ethnic group forming a majority. They work predominantly as fishermen, and the town is one of the biggest fish producers in the country.

== History ==
This area was long dominated by the native Sherbro people. In the late seventeenth and early eighteenth century, there were marriages between English traders of the Royal African Company and Sherbro women. Their descendants became merchants and traders, coming to dominate the slave trade and political power. The Corker/Caulker family dominated the Bumpe Chiefdom in the Moyamba District into the late 20th century.

There were Christian Methodist missionaries in this area from the early nineteenth century. In 1855, Shenge was chosen as the site for a mission station by the Church of the United Brethren in Christ. This was founded by Daniel Kumler Flickinger, and subsequently developed by Joseph Gomer.

Rufus Clark, a wealthy American potato farmer who had been converted at a United Brethren revival in Denver, sponsored the establishment of a theological school named for him in Shenge. In 1899, Clark sold 2,050 lots in Evanston, Colorado, to the University of Denver for $110,000. The lots had been appraised at a value of $250,000; Clark stipulated that these lots be sold for a profit. Clark sold his remaining share of Evanston to William C. Johnston for $60,000 the same year. Clark used the proceeds from these sales to alleviate some of the University of Denver's debts and to rebuild a theological school named for Clark and his wife in Shenge. When Clark died in 1910, he left a will that stipulated that around $200,000 of his estimated $250,000 estate would be given to the school bearing his name in Shenge. Despite a challenge by his daughter–who contended her father "was not of sound mind" when making his will–the donation was allowed to proceed.

In 1936 and 1937, anthropologist Henry Usher Hall visited Sherbro Island and the Shenge Chiefdom to study the Sherbro people. At the time of his visit, Shenge had a population of 15,200 people.

== 21st century ==
On September 9, 2009, a coastal boat or pampa was travelling a sea route of about 65 km (40 mi) along the coast from Shenge to the Western Area town of Tombo near Freetown with at least 246 passengers on board, including many schoolchildren returning from holidays. It capsized shortly after departure. The Sierra Leone Navy commander Mao Suma, who was in charge of the rescue operation, said sixteen bodies were recovered and 39 passengers rescued. Commander Suma said 213 passengers were still missing and feared dead.

The government promised to investigate the accident. The Sierra Leone Police said that overloading and bad weather might have been an issue.

This was the second major pampa accident in Sierra Leone in less than a decade. In November 2000 at least 150 people drowned when a boat capsized carrying 200 people; it was also traveling between Shenge and Tombo.

President Ernest Bai Koroma declared Monday 14 September 2009 as a day of national mourning for the victims of the boat accident. He and top members of his government traveled to Shenge to meet with local officials and survivors.

== Represented in popular culture ==
In the film Blood Diamond (2006), Shenge is said to be the home of the protagonist Solomon Vandy (played by Djimon Hounsou), a fisherman forced into the illegal diamond trade, and his family. Set in the 1990s, the film explores the attack on Shenge by the Revolutionary United Front (RUF), who capture Vandy.
