= Sherbro Island =

Coordinates: 7°33′N 12°42′W

Sherbro Island, Sierra Leone
- Interactive map of Sherbro Island, Sierra Leone
- Country: Sierra Leone
- Province: Southern Province
- District: Bonthe District

Population (2013 estimate)
  - Total: 28,457
- Time zone: UTC±0 (Greenwich Mean Time)

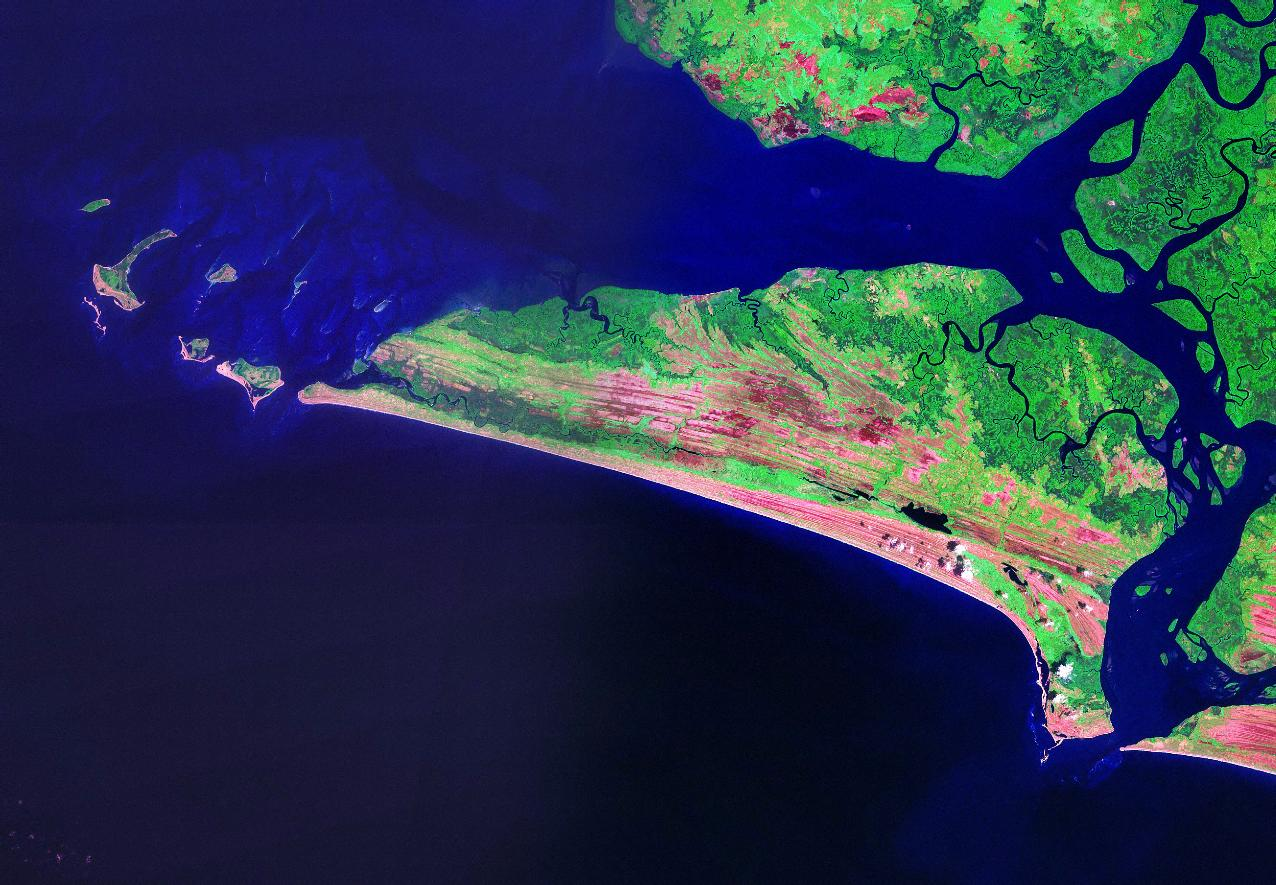
Natural Color Landsat image of Sherbro Island, Sierra Leone. In the west, the Turtle Islands can be seen.

Sherbro Island is in the Atlantic Ocean, and is included within Bonthe District, Southern Province, Sierra Leone. The island is separated from the African mainland by the Sherbro River in the north and Sherbro Strait in the east. It is 32 miles (51 km) long and up to 15 miles (24 km) wide, covering an area of approximately 230 square miles (600 km^{2}). The western extremity is Cape St. Ann. Bonthe, on the eastern end, is the chief port and commercial centre.

Historically, this was part of the territory of the historic Sherbro people, who dominated a large area of what is now Sierra Leone. Today they are concentrated in the southern and central part of Moyamba District. They make up by far the largest ethnic group in the island, where the total population is 28,457. The island has more than 65 miles (105 km) of tropical beaches. It has been earmarked by the Ministry for Tourism and Development of Sierra Leone for tourism development.

== Economic activities ==
Swamp-rice cultivation, tourism, and fishing are the main economic activities.

In 2024 it was reported that English actor Idris Elba, whose father is Sierra Leonean Creole, had founded Sherbro Alliance Partners with the goal of developing a "smart-city" capable of supporting up to a million people on Sherbro.

== History ==
Sherbro Island was long inhabited by the Sherbro people, who historically dominated other ethnicities in much of the region on the mainland. The islanders had an economy based on extensive fishing. They also traded by boat with neighboring people in villages along the coast.

During the Mane invasion in the 16th century, Sherbro was the center of one of their main kingdoms. The king throughout the first half of the 17th century was a man named Sherabola or Selboele, after whom the island was named.

In the seventeenth century Portuguese, Spanish, and Dutch explorers and traders came to this area. They traded with the Sherbro and with other tribes up the rivers to the interior. They referred to what is now known as the Sherbro River as the Madrebombo River, which may have referred to "mother drum" in Spanish. Dutch letters dated 1633 refer to the river in a spelling variation as Maderebombo. Other spelling versions included Madrabomba. (See: Navigantium Atque Itinerantium Bibliotheca)

In the seventeenth century, the Royal African Company, chartered as a monopoly in England, began to operate here and on the Guinea Coast as traders. While originally seeking gold, particularly along the Gambia River, by the early eighteenth century the RAC became involved in slave trading, which its monopoly covered.

The RAC established a Company fort known as York Island in the Sherbro Estuary. It was a port for exporting enslaved Africans to the Americas. Thomas Corker, who was from Falmouth, Cornwall, had been working with the RAC for more than a decade when he was appointed agent here in the late seventeenth century. He married the daughter of a Sherbro chief, and their two sons became the patriarchs of a family dynasty of traders and chiefs in the region. Shortly after being reassigned to The Gambia, he died on a business trip to England in 1700, but his descendants in Sierra Leone did well.

After Great Britain abolished the international African slave trade in 1807 it began to use former RAC trading fort on Sherbro Island as a base for naval operations against illegal slave traders. Liberated slaves were resettled in the Freetown colony. The United States also banned the importation of enslaved people in 1808, though enforcement was limited. But for decades more, both Spain and Portugal continued to buy African slaves for their colonies in the Caribbean, and Central and South America.

In 1815 Paul Cuffe, a successful African-American ship maker of Boston, Massachusetts, became interested in resettling free blacks in west Africa. The British had undertaken this at Freetown, Sierra Leone since 1792. There, Black Loyalists from Nova Scotia (African Americans freed in the American Revolution) had been joined by Maroons deported from Jamaica, Liberated Africans freed from illegal traders, and some of the ethnic groups in the territory of Sierra Leone who were interested in western culture, coalesced into the Creole/Krio ethnicity.

Cuffe believed that skilled American blacks could help develop trade between Sierra Leone and the United States, benefiting both. In 1815, he resettled a group of 88 American freedmen on Sherbro Island. After returning to the US, Cuffe marketed his cargo of goods taken on at Freetown.

Cuffe died in 1817, but the American Colonization Society (ACS), founded in 1820 by both abolitionists and slaveholders, continued the effort to resettle free blacks in Africa. They commissioned a survey of possible areas, including Sherbro Island. They found John Kizell, a Sherbro born locally who had returned after being captured and held in slavery in South Carolina. He gained freedom with the British during the American Revolutionary War and was among 1200 Black Loyalists resettled in Freetown in 1792. Kizell became a leader to a number of Sherbro people.

The U.S. Congress passed an act on March 3, 1819, authorizing transport of freed blacks to their "motherland". The ACS began to develop a colony in Africa for free American blacks. It later became known as the Republic of Liberia. In this period, most free blacks (and enslaved) in the US were native to the nation; they had family and history there. They wanted to gain equal rights and non-discriminatory treatment in the US.

In 1821, the ship Elizabeth from New York carried 86 free African Americans (including missionary Daniel Coker), as well as three ACS agents, as the first ACS sponsored group to Sherbro Island. Disease and fever quickly killed more than a quarter of the would-be settlers. The survivors relocated in April 1822 to Providence Island at Cape Mesurado in what developed as the nation of present-day Liberia.

In 1861 the British Crown Colony at Freetown acquired Sherbro Island from the Sherbro people, putting it under the jurisdiction of its government. The Sherbro continued to live there. The colonial and later protectorate government administered it until Sierra Leone achieved independence in 1961.

As of 2024, there is an ongoing project to make the island a special economic zone.

== Environment ==
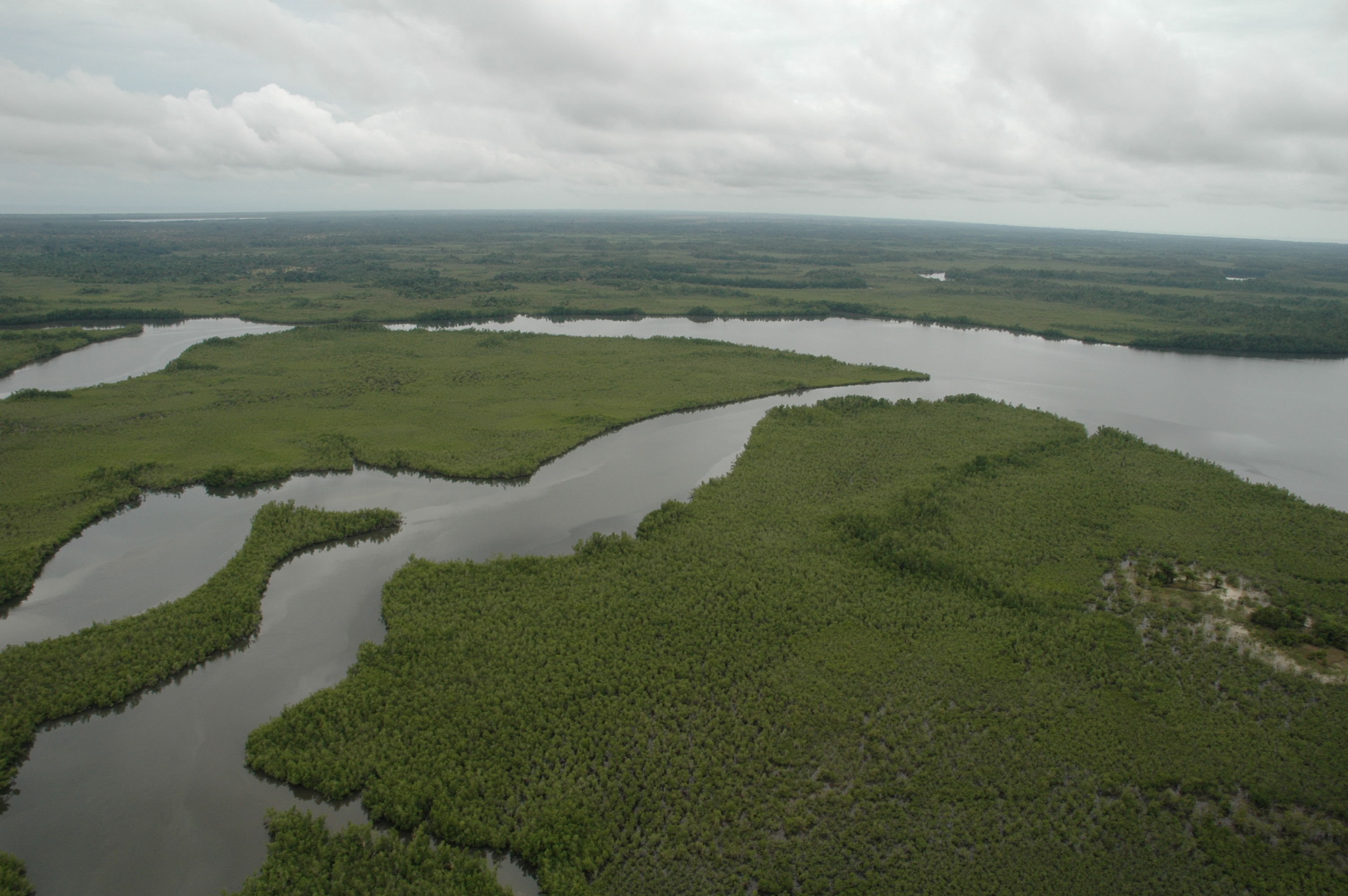
Part of the coast of Sherbro Island

Sherbro Island is believed to be a breeding ground for green sea turtles as well as leatherback sea turtles. The waters surrounding the island hold some of the biggest tarpon in the world. Records of the sportfishing organisation IGFA have been made by catches from this area. African manatees also inhabit the delta of the Sherbro river system north of the island.

== Population ==
In May 2013, the Government of Sierra Leone's record of the island's population was 28,457.
