= Seniora Doll =

Seniora Doll, or Senora Doll, was a Sherbro princess. She held the position of the duchess of the Ya Kumba ruling house of the Yawri Bay Area between the Sierra Leone peninsula and the Sherbro estuary. In the late 17th century, she married an English trader and Royal African Company agent, Thomas Corker, and their two sons Stephen and Robin ruled as the first Caulker chiefs through her royal lineage. She died in 1722, twenty-two years after Thomas Corker died in 1700 in England.
