= Bumpe Chiefdom =

The Bumpe Chiefdom is a Chiefdom of Sierra Leone located in Moyamba District, Southern Province, Sierra Leone. It is centred on Rotifunk. The chiefdom comprises 208 villages.

== Bumpe chiefs ==
- 1820–1832 Thomas Stephen Caulker, also known as Bar Tham
- 1832–1842 Charles Caulker
- 1842–1857 James Canreba Caulker
- 1857–1864 Thomas Augustus Caulker (Tham Bum)
- 1864–1888 Richard Canreba Caulker (exiled to Gambia)
- 1888–1895 Vacant
- 1895–1898 Richard Canreba Caulker (2nd time), deposed
- 1899–1902 James Canreba Caulker
- 1902–1907 John Canreba Caulker
- 1907–1921 Thomas Canreba Caulker
- 1921–1954 Albert Gbosowah Caulker
- 1954–1983 William I. Caulker
- 1984–present Charles B. Caulker
