= Sherbro people =

Ethnic group in Sierra Leone

Total population
- 134,606

Regions with significant populations
- Sierra Leone (Bonthe District and the Western Area)

Languages
- Sherbro • Krio • English

Religion
- Christianity • Islam

Related ethnic groups
- Krio, Gola

The Sherbro people are a native people of Sierra Leone, who speak the Sherbro language; they make up 1.9% of Sierra Leone's population or 134,606. The Sherbro are found primarily in their homeland in Bonthe District, where they make up 40% of the population, in coastal areas of Moyamba District, and in the Western Area of Sierra Leone, particularly in Freetown. During pre-colonial days, the Sherbro were one of the most dominant ethnic groups in Sierra Leone, but in the early 21st century, the Sherbro comprise a small minority in the nation. The Sherbro speak their own language, called Sherbro language.

The Sherbro are divided into two main groups: the Sherbro in Southeastern Sierra Leone, and the Sherbro in the Western Area of Sierra Leone. The Sherbro in Southeastern Sierra Leone, which is home to most of the Sherbro population of Sierra Leone, are a close ally of their neighbor the Mende people, and most Sherbro in Southeastern Sierra Leone speak the Mende language and they have integrated large amounts of the Mende tradition along with their native Sherbro tradition. However, the Sherbro in the Western Area (in and around Freetown) are traditionally allies of the Krio people; and Sherbro in the Western Area in Sierra Leone have also integrated large amounts of Krio tradition. Unlike most Sherbro in Southeastern Sierra Leone, most Sherbro in the Western Area of Sierra Leone do not speak the Mende language. Politically the vast majority of Sherbro support the Sierra Leone People's Party (SLPP). The current president of Sierra Leone, Julius Maada Bio, is a Mende-speaking ethnic Sherbro from the Gola Rainforest region of the country.

The Sherbro are primarily fishermen and traders. They have a rich culture and have integrated some western culture and ideals. Their culture is unlike that of all other ethnic groups in Sierra Leone. The ethnic group in the nation whose culture is similar (in terms of embrace of Western culture) are the Krio people, descended largely from African Americans (known as Black Loyalists), who had been freed from slavery by the British during the American Revolutionary War, resettled in Nova Scotia, and then chose to go to Freetown in the late 18th and early 19th centuries. The Sherbro and the Krio are close allies; they have intermarried since early colonial settlements in the 1790s.

The Sherbro have been an indigenous people in the territory now known as Sierra Leone. In the 18th century, they began to get involved in the slave trade and became more powerful than the European slave traders. They began to employ the Mende people to work for them to find slaves to meet the growing demand. In the 1920s, the Sherbro people were still being ruled by their own chiefs.

== History ==
The Sherbro were one of many indigenous peoples living in the territory of Sierra Leone before the colonial era. The first interaction with Europeans came during the 15th century, when Portuguese explorers, settlers, and traders came to the area.

The English followed soon after and, in the 1620s, they had a number of agents trading and purchasing items in the Sherbro Country. The Sherbro intermarried with them, establishing some of the region's most prominent chieftaincy families by doing so. Like the later Krio, who developed in Sierra Leone after the colony was established, the Sherbro have a more westernized culture than that of other indigenous ethnic groups there. From the beginning of the settlement of liberated slaves in Sierra Leone, the ancestors of the Krio generally intermarried with their allies the Sherbro.

== Relationship with the Krios ==
Many Sherbro assimilate as Krio (or Creole), as they share the Christian faith and Western names. According to Anaïs Ménard, the only Sierra Leonean ethnic group whose culture is similar (in terms of its embrace of Western culture) are Westernized members of the Sherbro people. Because some of the Sherbro interacted with Portuguese and English traders and intermarried with them in the mid-fifteenth to eighteenth centuries (producing Afro-European clans such as the Sherbro Tuckers and Sherbro Caulkers), some of the Sherbro have a more westernized culture than that of other Sierra Leone ethnic groups. As Creoles settled in places such as Bonthe for trading and missionary purposes, the Creoles intermarried with their allies the Sherbros from as far back as the 18th century. However, since the independence of Sierra Leone, all ethnic groups in Sierra Leone have been inter-marrying increasingly.

== Notable Sherbro ==
- Julius Maada Bio, current president of Sierra Leone
- Abraham S Tucker, head therapist in Chicago, IL
- Sarah Tucker, model and beauty pageant contestant who represented Sierra Leone at the Miss World 2018
- Thomas Corker – (died 1700) British-born Irish man and progenitor of the Sherbro Caulker clan
- Kpana Lewis (1830–1912), Sherbro chief and opponent of colonial rule
- Barnabas Root (born Fahma Yahny) (died 1877), clergyman and missionary to his nation
- John Karefa-Smart, politician and former leader of the United National People's Party (UNPP)
- John Akar, entertainer; he composed the music of Sierra Leone's national anthem
- Henry M. Joko-Smart, former Supreme Court Justice of Sierra Leone
- Patricia Kabbah, late First Lady of Sierra Leone and late wife of former President Ahmad Tejan Kabbah
- John Kizell, African-American immigrant to Sierra Leone born on Sherbro Island
- Paul Kpaka, footballer, Sierra Leone
- Christian Caulker, footballer, Sierra Leone
- Gibril Wilson
- John Trye
- Michael Tommy, footballer, Sierra Leone
- B. J. Tucker, an American football cornerback with the San Francisco 49ers of the NFL.
- Seniora Doll, Sherbro princess during the early years of Sierra Leone
- Peter L. Tucker, Chief Executive for the Commission for Racial Equality (UK)
- Joseph Christian Humper, a bishop in the United Methodist Church
- Thomas Caulker, King of Bumpey
- Yeami Dunia
- Christian Moses
- Daniel Francis
- Kevin Wright
- George Davies
- Kwame Quee
- Steven Caulker
- Prince Barrie
- John Keister
- Rodney Michael
- Solomon Morris

== Clans ==
- Sherbro Charley
- Sherbro Bullom
- Sherbro Caulkers
- Sherbro Clevelands
- Sherbro Hubbards
- Sherbro Macfoy
- Sherbro Rogers
- Sherbro Rutile
- Sherbro Tuckers

== See also ==
- Thomas Corker, Chief Royal African agent in Sherbro country
- Seniora Doll, married Thomas Corker; their descendants are the Shenge and Bonthe Caulkers
