= Thomas Corker =

English agent in Africa (1669/1670–1700)

Thomas Corker (1669/1670 – 10 September 1700) was known as an English agent for the Royal African Company on York Island (now Sherbro, Sierra Leone). He married a Sherbro princess and had two sons with her before his early death.

His sons also became merchant traders and developed a family dynasty that became prominent among the Sherbro people and British colonists, in the area now known as the Moyamba District, Southern Province, Sierra Leone. As paramount chiefs, they dominated the Bumpe and Kagboro chiefdoms into the 20th century. Descendants live primarily in Bonthe and Shenge of that District.

== Early life and education ==
Born in Falmouth, Cornwall, Thomas Corker/Caulker was the younger of two sons of Thomas Corker, a ship's doctor from County Meath, Ireland. His father had settled in Ireland from Manchester, England. Corker married Jane Newman, a local woman of Falmouth. Thomas was baptized on 4 February 1669. His older brother was Robert Corker. They had two younger sisters, Jane and Anne.

After their father died young, their maternal uncle John Newman Jr. acted as guardian. The boys were expected to earn their own way. His brother Robert Corker had a successful career as a politician, serving as mayor of Falmouth five times.

== Career ==
At the age of 14, Thomas entered the Royal African Company as an apprentice. He was assigned to the Guinea Coast, where he served traders on the rivers. He eventually became a chief agent on York Island, Sherbro. This was a slave trading centre on the Sherbro River.

While working in the Sherbro region, he married a daughter of a Sherbro chief. By Sherbro family accounts, she was known to the English as Seniora Doll or Senora Doll, and was of the house of Ya Kumba. Her father ruled on the shore of the Yawri Bay (according to Bulom oral tradition). The couple had two sons, Robin and Stephen.

Thomas Corker was transferred by the Royal African Company to The Gambia in April 1699 and left his Sherbro family behind. On a business trip to England, he died at his birthplace of Falmouth in 1700 and was buried there.

His sons, Robin and Stephen Corker, inherited their mother's chiefdom; they used their English ancestry to build influence with other early traders in the region. The Crown opened up the slave trade beyond the RAC, and the family became influential in and wealthy from it well into the 19th century.

The family may have intermarried in the 18th century and later with descendants of Skinner Caulker, an English man known to have settled in the region in the mid-18th century, as did James Cleveland. Both also married local women and had descendants who competed for power in the region.

By the 19th century, the family was known as the Caulkers. They dominated the Bumpe Chiefdom in the colony of Sierra Leone and were a major slave trading Afro-European clan in West Africa.

== Descendants ==
Today most of the Caulker descendants live in the towns of Bonthe and Shenge in the Moyamba District, where the Sherbro are concentrated. The clan still maintains its oral and written testimony about its English ancestor, Thomas Corker.

== Memorial ==
Corker was memorialized by a Baroque marble and freestone monument at the Church of King Charles the Martyr, Falmouth, where he had been baptized as a child. In 1978, Rev. W. J. Peter Boyd for Thomas, the rector at that time, issued a delayed Baptism certificate by and his brother, Robert.

== See also ==
- Sherbro people
- Seniora Doll

== Resources ==
- Adam Jones, History in Africa, Vol. 10, 1983 (1983), pp. 151–162.
- Lovejoy, P. E. (2000). Transformations in Slavery: A History of Slavery in Africa. Cambridge University Press. ISBN 9780521784306.
- Philip J. Havik (2004). Silences and Soundbites: The Gendered Dynamics of Trade and Brokerage in the Pre-colonial Guinea Bissau Region. Lit. ISBN 9783825877095.
- Lovejoy, P.E. (2000). Transformations in Slavery: A History of Slavery in Africa. Cambridge University Press. ISBN 9780521784306.
- Lang, G. (2000). Entwisted Tongues: Comparative Creole Literatures. Rodopi. ISBN 9789042007376.
- "PortCities Bristol". discoveringbristol.org.uk.
