= HMS Rolla (1829) =

HMS Rolla was a Cherokee-class, 10-gun brig-sloop of the Royal Navy from 1829 to 1868. She was launched at Plymouth Dockyard on 10 December 1829. She served as a member of the West Africa Squadron for several years before becoming a boys training brig in 1848. Subsequently she was a tender to HMS Victory between 1853 and 1856 and finally n apprentices training brig from 1858. The ship was broken up at Portsmouth in 1868.

== Career ==
Rolla initially served on Scottish Fishery Protection duties before proceeding to west coast of Africa in 1836. She was recommissioned several times for further cruises on this station. She captured seven slaving vessels during these duties:

Vessel name	Vessel type	Date captured	Fate of vessel	Notes
Luisita	Spanish slave schooner.	21 November 1836	Sentenced to be condemned on 16 December 1836.	Detained in the River Sherbo.
San Nicolas	Spanish slave brig.	2 December 1836	Sentenced to be condemned 2 January 1837.	Detained at Sea-bar in the River Sherbo.
Lechuguino	Spanish pilot boat.	27 December 1836	Sentenced to be condemned 10 January 1837.	Detained in Rio Pongas. Forty-nine enslaved Africans onboard.
Esperimento	Spanish slave schooner.	27 December 1836	Sentenced to be condemned 12 January 1837.	
Porto Formozo	Portuguese slave schooner.	16 September 1840	Sentenced to be condemned 5 November 1840.	
Vanguardia	Spanish slave brigantine.	11 November 1840	Sentenced to be condemned 9 December 1840.	
Feliz Ventura	Brazilian slave brig.	29 November 1840	Sentenced to be condemned 11 January 1841.	

Between 24 and 31 March 1842, Rolla and the Pluto entered the Gallinas River between Cape Saint Ann and Grand Cape Mount, Sierra Leone, where they destroyed four 'slave factories. In 1847, Rolla returned to Portsmouth and was used as both a training brig and tender to HMS Victory. In 1868, Rolla was broken up at Portsmouth Dockyard in 1868.

== Figurehead ==
Upon breaking up of Rolla, her figurehead was housed in the collection at Chatham museum where it was listed in the 1911 Admiralty Catalogue. By 1957 it was outside the Admiral Superintendent's house, being too small to join the other figureheads beside the Admiral's Walk. It was then transferred to HMS Sussex, the Sussex Division of the Royal Naval Reserve, remaining there until its closure it 1994, when it was transferred to the Portsmouth collection. It can be seen at the National Museum of the Royal Navy, Portsmouth.
