= Governor Hay =

Governor Hay may refer to:

- Edward Drummond-Hay (Royal Navy officer) (1815–1884), governor of Madras from 1842 to 1848
- James Shaw Hay (1839–1924), acting governor of Sierra Leone at various times between 1886 and 1891, and 3rd Governor of Barbados from 1891 to 1900
- Marion E. Hay (1865–1933), governor of Washington from 1910 to 1913
