= Gallinas =

Gallinas may refer to:

== In Sierra Leone ==
- Gallinas River (Sierra Leone)
- Gallinas people, Sierra Leone

== In Mexico ==
- Gallinas River (Mexico), a tributary of Santa Maria River (San Luis Potosi)

== In the United States ==
- Gallinas, California, a neighborhood of Novato, California
- Las Gallinas Valley, a valley in Marin County, California
- Las Gallinas, California, a neighborhood of San Rafael, California
- Gallinas Mountains, New Mexico
- Gallinas National Forest, New Mexico
- Gallinas River (New Mexico), or its tributary Gallinas Creek
- Gallinas massacre, an 1861 clash between Apache and Confederate Forces in Confederate Arizona

== See also ==
- Gallinas River (disambiguation)
