= List of colonial governors of Sierra Leone =

This is a list of colonial administrators in Sierra Leone from the establishment of the Province of Freedom Colony by the Committee for the Relief of the Black Poor which lasted between 1787 and 1789 and the list of colonial administrators of the Colony of Sierra Leone and the settlement of Freetown established by the Sierra Leone Company in March 1792 until Sierra Leone's independence in 1961.

== Administrator (1787) of the Granville Town Settlement ==
On 14 May 1787, the Province of Freedom was founded by the Committee for the Relief of the Black Poor for freed slaves.

- B. Thompson (14 May – September 1787)

== Governor (1787–1789) of the Granville Town Settlement ==
On 22 August 1788, the Province of Freedom and land along the Freetown peninsula was granted to Captain John Taylor of HMS Miro. In 1789, it was abandoned.

- John Taylor (August 1788 – 1789)

== Agent (1791–1792) of the new Granville Town Settlement ==
In January 1791, the Granville Town was restored by the St. George Bay Company.

- Alexander Falconbridge (January 1791 – March 1792)

== Superintendent (1792) of the Colony of Sierra Leone and settlement of Freetown ==
In 1792, Freetown was founded as the main town of the newly established Colony of Sierra Leone

- John Clarkson (March – July 1792)

== Governors (1792–1827) of the Colony of Sierra Leone ==
- John Clarkson (July – 31 December 1792)
- William Dawes (31 December 1792 – March 1794) (1st time)
- Zachary Macaulay (March 1794 – 6 May 1795) (1st time)
- William Dawes (6 May 1795 – March 1796) (2nd time)
- Zachary Macaulay (March 1796 – April 1799) (2nd time)
- John Gray (April – May 1799) (1st time)

On 5 July 1799, the Province of Freedom was renamed Sierra Leone.

- Thomas Ludlam (May 1799 – 1800) (1st time)
- John Gray (1800 – January 1801) (2nd time)
- William Dawes (January 1801 – February 1803) (3rd time)
- William Day (February 1803 – 1803) (1st time)
- Thomas Ludlam (1803–1805) (2nd time)
- William Day (1805 – 4 November 1805) (2nd time)

On 1 January 1808, Sierra Leone (including coastal area) becomes Crown colony of the United Kingdom, and Sierra Leone Company rule was ended.

- Thomas Ludlam (1806 – 21 July 1808) (3rd time, acting to 1 January 1808)
- Thomas Perronet Thompson (21 July 1808 – 12 February 1810)
- Edward H. Columbine (12 February 1810 – May 1811)
- Robert Bones (May – 1 July 1811) (acting)
- Charles William Maxwell (1 July 1811 – July 1815)
- Charles MacCarthy (July – December 1814) (1st time, acting for Maxwell)
- J. Mailing (December 1814 – January 1815) (acting for Maxwell)
- R. Purdie (January – March 1815) (acting for Maxwell)
- William Appleton (March – June 1815) (acting for Maxwell)
- Captain Henry Barry Hyde (June – July 1815) (acting for Maxwell)
- Charles MacCarthy (from 1820, Sir Charles Macarthy) (July 1815 – July 1820) (2nd time, acting to 1 January 1816)
- Sir Alexander Grant (28 July 1820 – 1 February 1821) (1st time, acting)
- E. Burke (1 February 1821 – 4 February 1821) (acting)

On 17 October 1821, Sierra Leone territory becomes part of British West African Territories. Its Governorship was held simultaneously by Governor (from 1827 until 1837 Lieutenant governor) of Sierra Leone.

- Sir Alexander Grant (4 February 1821 – 28 November 1821) (2nd time, acting)
- Sir Charles MacCarthy (November 1821 – 21 January 1824) (3rd time)
- Daniel Molloy Hamilton (21 January – 5 February 1824) (acting)
- Major-General Sir Charles Turner (5 February 1824 – 7 March 1826)
- Kenneth Macaulay (colonialist) and Samuel Smart (1st time) (8 March – August 1826) (acting)
- Sir Neil Campbell (August 1826 – December 1827)

== Lieutenant governors (1827–1837) of the Colony of Sierra Leone ==
- Hugh Lumley (December 1827 – 1828) (1st time)
- Dixon Denham (1828 – 8 May 1828)
- Hugh Lumley (9 June – July 1828) (2nd time)
- Samuel Smart (July – November 1828) (2nd time, acting)
- Major Henry John Ricketts (November 1828 – 1829) (acting)
- Augustine Fitzgerald Evans (1829–1830) (acting)
- Alexander Maclean Fraser (1830) (acting)
- Alexander Findlay (1830 – July 1833)
- Michael Linning Melville (July – December 1833) (acting)
- Octavius Temple (December 1833 – 1834)
- Thomas Cole (1834 – February 1835) (1st time, acting)
- Henry Dundas Campbell (February 1835 – 1837)
- Thomas Cole (1837) (2nd time, acting)

== Governors (1837–1961) of the Colony of Sierra Leone ==
Flag of the governor of Sierra Leone from 1889 to 1916

Flag of the governor of Sierra Leone from 1916 to 1961

- Richard Doherty (1837–1840)
- John Jeremie (1840 – April 1841)
- John Carr (April – September 1841) (acting)
- William Fergusson (September 1841 – January 1842) (1st time, acting)
- George Macdonald (January 1842 – July 1844)
- William Fergusson (July 1844 – 1845) (2nd time)

On 13 January 1850, the British West African Territories was dissolved and Sierra Leone again becomes a separate crown colony.

- Norman William MacDonald (1845–1852)
- Sir Arthur Edward Kennedy (13 September 1852 – 1854) (1st time)
- Robert Dugan (1854) (1st time, acting)
- Sir Stephen John Hill (1854–1855) (1st time)
- Robert Dugan (1855) (2nd time)
- Sir Stephen John Hill (1855–1859) (2nd time)
- Alexander Fitzjames (1859–1860)
- Sir Stephen John Hill (1860–1861) (3rd time)
- William Hill and T. H. Smith (1861–1862) (acting)
- Samuel Wensley Blackall (1862–1865) (1st time)
- William John Chamberlayne (1865 – 19 February 1866) (acting)

On 19 February 1866, Sierra Leone territory becomes part of the British West African Settlements. Its Governorship was held simultaneously by Governor of Sierra Leone.

- Samuel Wensley Blackall (19 February 1866 – 1867) (2nd time)
- Gustavus Nigel Kingscote Anker Yonge (1867) (acting)
- Samuel Wensley Blackall (1867–1868) (3rd time)
- John Jennings Kendall (1868–1869) (1st time, acting)
- Sir Arthur Edward Kennedy (1869–1871) (2nd time)
- John Jennings Kendall (1871) (2nd time, acting)
- Ponsonby Sheppard (1871) (acting)
- Sir Arthur Edward Kennedy (1871 – January 1872) (3rd time)
- John Jennings Kendall (January – February 1872) (3rd time, acting)
- John Pope Hennessy (February 1872 – 7 March 1873)
- Robert William Keate (7–17 March 1873)
- Alexander Bravo and Robert William Harley (17 March – 2 October 1873) (acting)
- Sir Garnet Wolseley, 1st Viscount Wolseley (2 October 1873 – 4 March 1874)
- George Berkeley (4 March – 17 December 1874)

On 17 December 1874, British West African Settlements was renamed British West Africa Settlements.

- George French (17 December 1874 – 1875) (acting)
- Cornelius Hendricksen Kortright (1875) (1st time)
- Sir Samuel Rowe (1875–1876) (1st time)
- Cornelius Hendricksen Kortright (1876–1877) (2nd time)
- Horatio James Huggins (1877) (acting)
- Sir Samuel Rowe (September 1877 – 1880) (2nd time)
- William Streeten (1880–1881) (acting)
- Sir Samuel Rowe (1881) (3rd time)
- Francis Frederick Pinkett (1881) (1st time, acting)
- Arthur Elibank Havelock (1881–1883) (1st time)
- Francis Frederick Pinkett (1883) (2nd time, acting)
- Arthur Elibank Havelock (1883–1884) (2nd time)
- Arthur M. Tarleton (1884) (acting)
- Francis Frederick Pinkett (1884–1885) (3rd time, acting)
- Sir Samuel Rowe (1885–1886) (4th time)
- Sir James Shaw Hay (1886–1887) (1st time, acting)
- Sir Samuel Rowe (1887–1888) (5th time)
- John Meredith Maltby (1888) (1st time, acting)

On 28 November 1888, the British West Africa Settlements was dissolved and Sierra Leone again becomes a separate crown colony.

- Sir James Shaw Hay (1888–1889) (2nd time, acting to 24 November 1888)
- William Gordon Patchett and Sydney Francis Foster (1889) (acting)
- John Meredith Maltby (1889–1890) (2nd time)
- Sir James Shaw Hay (1890–1891) (3rd time)
- John Joseph Crooks (1891–1892) (acting)
- William Hollingworth Quayle Jones (1892) (1st time, acting)
- Francis Fleming (1892–1893) (1st time)
- William Hollingworth Quayle Jones (1893) (2nd time, acting)
- Francis Fleming (1893–1894) (2nd time)
- William Hollingworth Quayle Jones (1894) (3rd time, acting)
- Frederic Cardew (1894–1895) (1st time)
- J. E. Caulfield (1895 – 24 August 1895) (1st time, acting)

On 24 August 1895, hinterland of Sierra Leone becomes British protectorate, and crown colony was renamed Sierra Leone Colony and Protectorate.

- Frederic Cardew (from 22 June 1897, Sir Frederic Cardew) (24 August 1895 – 1897) (2nd time)
- James Cassamaijor Gore (1897) (acting)
- J. E. Caulfield (1897) (2nd time, acting)
- Sir Frederic Cardew (1897–1899) (3rd time)
- Matthew Nathan (1899) (acting)
- Sir Frederic Cardew (1899–1900) (4th time)
- Caulfield (1900 – 11 December 1900) (3rd time, acting)
- Sir Charles King-Harman (11 December 1900 – 3 October 1904)
  - Lieutenant-Colonel Frederick Thomas Henstock (1902) (acting while King-Harman was in the UK)
  - Colonel John Willoughby Astley Marshall (18 September 1902 – 4 October 1902) (acting while King-Harman was in the UK)
  - Colonel Francis John Graves (4 October 1902 – ) (acting while King-Harman was in the UK)
- Sir Leslie Probyn (3 October 1904 – 1910)
- Sir Edward Marsh Merewether (1910–1913) (1st time)
- Claud Hollis (1913) (acting)
- Sir Edward Marsh Merewether (1913–1916) (2nd time)
- Sir Richard James Wilkinson (9 March 1916 – 1921) (1st time)
- John C. Maxwell (1921) (acting)
- Sir Richard James Wilkinson (1921 – 4 May 1922) (2nd time)
- Alexander Ransford Slater (from 1924, Sir Alexander Ransford Slater) (4 May 1922 – 24 September 1927)
- Sir Joseph Aloysius Byrne (24 September 1927 – 1929) (1st time)
- Mark Aitchison Young (1929–1930) (acting in the capacity of as Colonial Secretary)
- Sir Joseph Aloysius Byrne (1930 – 23 May 1931) (2nd time)
- Sir Arnold Wienholt Hodson (23 May 1931 – 17 July 1934)
- Sir Henry Monck-Mason Moore (17 July 1934 – 21 May 1937)
- Sir Douglas James Jardine (21 May 1937 – 5 July 1941)
- Sir Hubert Craddock Stevenson (5 July 1941 – September 1947)
- Sir George Beresford-Stooke (September 1947 – December 1952)
- Sir Robert de Zouche Hall (December 1952 – 1 September 1956)
- Maurice Henry Dorman (from 2 January 1957, Sir Maurice Henry Dorman) (1 September 1956 – 27 April 1961)

In 1961, Sierra Leone achieved independence from the United Kingdom. After independence, the viceroy in Sierra Leone was the Governor-General of Sierra Leone.

== See also ==
- History of Sierra Leone
- President of Sierra Leone
  - List of heads of state of Sierra Leone
- List of chief ministers and prime ministers of Sierra Leone
