= Gallinas River =

Gallinas River may refer to:

- Gallinas River (Sierra Leone)
- Gallinas River (New Mexico), a tributary of the Rio Grande
- Gallinas River (Mexico), in Huasteca

== See also ==
- Gallinas (disambiguation)
