= Charles King-Harman =

British colonial administrator

Sir Charles King-Harman KCMG
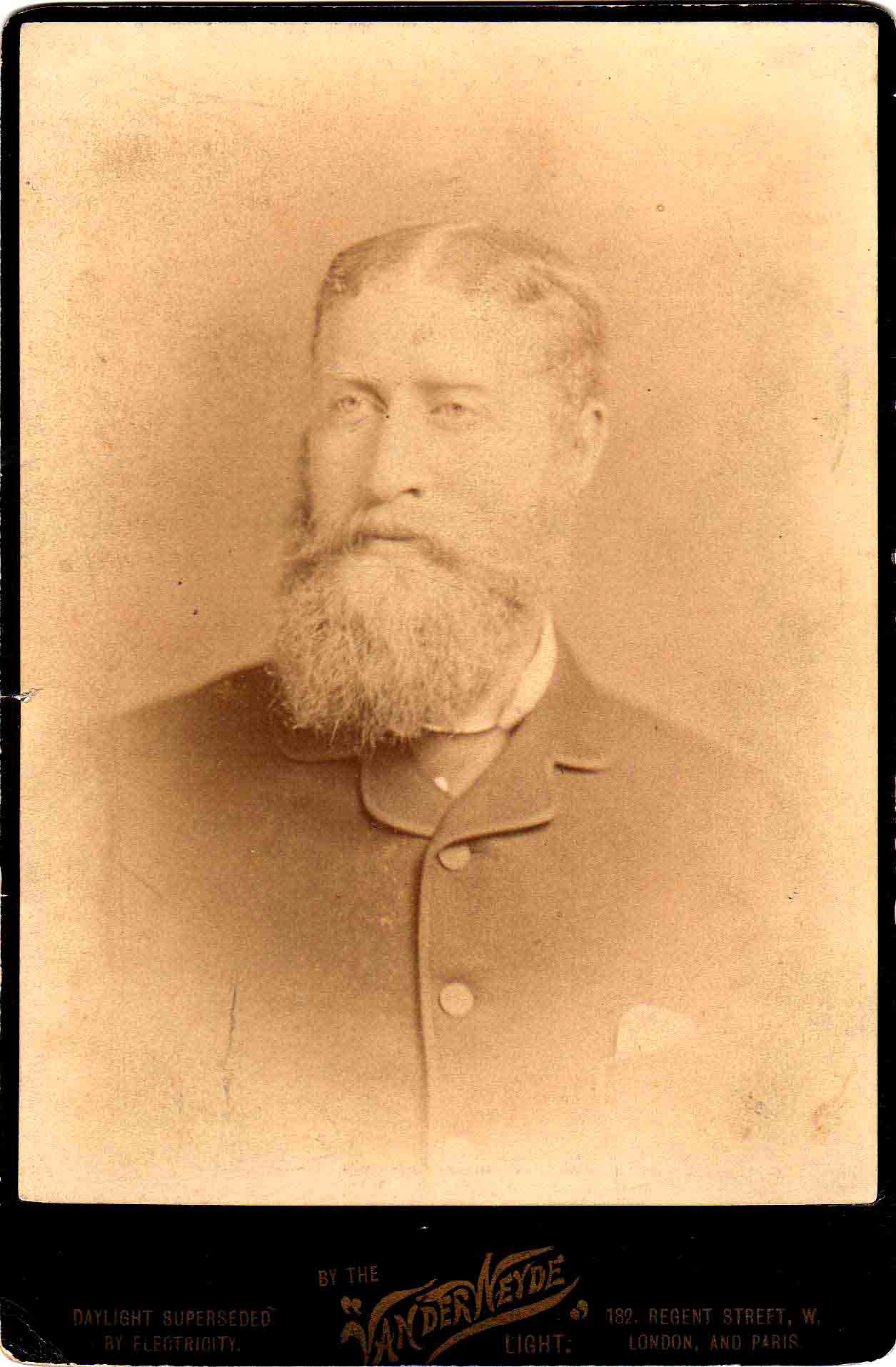

Administrator of Saint Lucia
- In office 1897–1900

Governor of Sierra Leone
- In office 1900–1904
- Monarchs: Queen Victoria; Edward VII
- Preceded by: Sir Frederic Cardew
- Succeeded by: Sir Leslie Probyn

High Commissioner of Cyprus
- In office 1904–1911
- Monarchs: Edward VII; George V
- Preceded by: Sir Sir William Haynes Smith
- Succeeded by: Sir Hamilton Goold-Adams

Personal details
- Born: 26 April 1851
- Died: 17 April 1939 (aged 87)
- Spouse: Constance Biddulph
- Parents: Hon. Lawrence King-Harman (father); Mary Cecilia Johnstone (mother)
- Relatives: Robert King, 1st Viscount Lorton (grandfather), Edward King-Harman (brother)
- Education: University of Cambridge
- Profession: Colonial administrator

Sir Charles Anthony King-Harman KCMG (26 April 1851 – 17 April 1939) was a British colonial administrator.

== Biography ==
King-Harman was the son of Hon. Lawrence Harman King-Harman, the son of Robert King, 1st Viscount Lorton, and Mary Cecilia Johnstone. He was the younger brother of the politician Edward King-Harman.

He was educated at the University of Cambridge, and entered the Colonial Service in 1874. He served in the Bahamas, Cyprus and Barbados before working as Colonial Secretary in Mauritius between 1893 and 1897, during which he was invested as a Companion of the Order of St Michael and St George (CMG) in 1893. He was administrator of Saint Lucia from 1897 to 1900, and was promoted to a Knight Commander of the Order of St Michael and St George (KCMG) in 1900.

In December 1900 he took up the post of Governor of Sierra Leone Colony and Protectorate, serving as such until September 1904. He was back in the United Kingdom for several months in 1902, during which there were acting governors, and completed a tour through the protectorate after his return, in February 1903.

He was High Commissioner of Cyprus between 1904 and 1911, and was the representative of the Mediterranean colonies at the coronation of George V in 1911.

King-Harman married on 12 July 1888 Constance Biddulph, daughter of General Sir Robert Biddulph and Sophia Lambert.
