= Hut Tax War of 1898 =

Sierra Leone protest movement

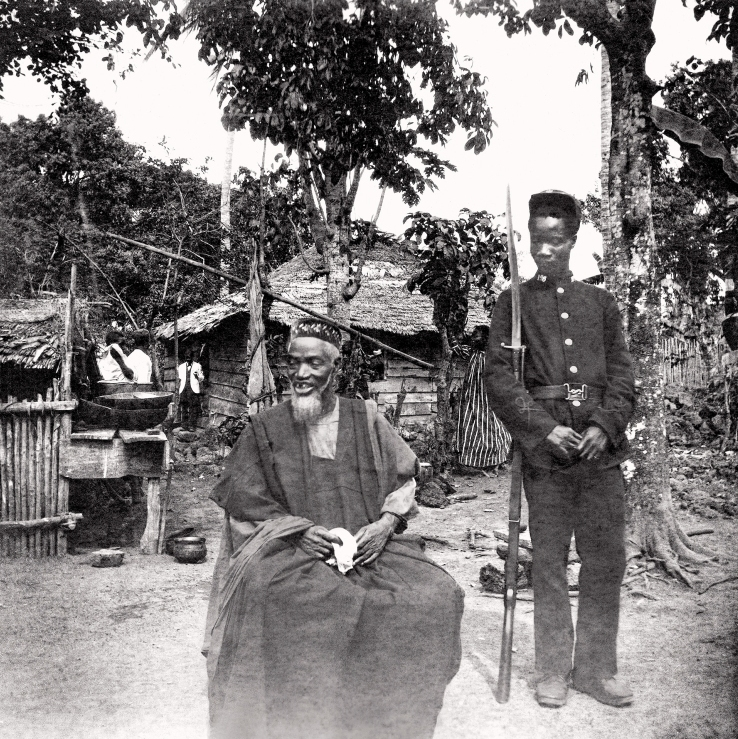
- Bai Bureh under arrest in 1898.
Location	Colony and Protectorate of Sierra Leone
Result	British victory

Belligerents
Sierra Leone	Temne and Mende rebels

Commanders and leaders
Frederic Cardew	Bai Bureh (surrendered)

Casualties and losses
Unknown	Unknown 96 rebels executed following the war

The Hut Tax War of 1898 was a resistance in the newly annexed Protectorate of Sierra Leone to a new tax imposed by the colonial governor. The British had established the Protectorate in 1896 to demonstrate their dominion over the territory to other European powers following the Berlin Conference. The tax constituted a major burden on residents of the Protectorate; 24 indigenous chiefs had signed a petition against it, explaining its adverse effects on their societies, to no avail. The immediate catalyst for hostilities was an attempt by British colonial officials to arrest the Temne chief Bai Bureh, a general and war strategist, on the basis of rumours. Although often depicted as the chief who initiated an armed resistance in the North in 1898, late 20th-century sources suggest he was unfairly identified by the colonial government as a primary instigator, with the government's hostile actions provoking the war. Later that year, resistance arose in the south by the leading Mende.

== Background ==
The rebellion was sparked by a new taxation policy introduced by the governor of Sierra Leone, Colonel Frederic Cardew. In order to fund the British colonial government's expenses, Cardew implemented a hut tax on 1 January 1898, which stipulated that all residents of the colony would pay a tax to the government based on the size of their huts; the owner of a four-roomed hut was to be taxed ten shillings annually, while those with smaller huts would pay five shillings instead.

The tax immediately proved unpopular in Sierra Leone, as it was beyond the financial means of many of the colony's inhabitants. Another factor which provoked anti-colonial anger was the government's decision to tax unoccupied dwellings. Cardew also demanded that all chiefs in Sierra Leone implement a system of corvée to maintain the colony's infrastructure, which did not give most of the colonial population (who were subsistence farmers) sufficient time to harvest their crops. In response to the tax, 24 chiefs signed a petition addressed to Cardew, explaining the negative effects it was having on their societies and requesting that he rescind the tax, as many chiefs perceived the tax as an attack on their sovereignty.

== Bai Bureh's revolt ==
In the same year as the tax was introduced by Cardew, two rebellions against British colonial rule broke out in the hinterlands of Sierra Leone. One was led by 61-year old Temne chief Bai Bureh, who led a mixed force of Tenme and Loko rebels in open revolt in the northeast of the colony. He insisted that his people should not be compelled to pay tribute to foreign rulers and that local chiefs should settle their own affairs without British control.

Bureh was provoked to revolt by an arrest warrant issued by the colonial government, which was intended to serve as a show of force to preemptively discourage any potential rebellion. In February 1898, Bureh initiated the revolt, launching attacks on British colonial officials and Creole merchants with his rebels. Despite the ongoing rebellion, Bureh dispatched two peace overtures to the British in April and June of that year, aided by the mediation of Limba chief Almamy Suluku. Cardew rejected both offers, as Bureh would not agree to surrender unconditionally.

Bureh quickly gained the support of several prominent African chiefs, including Kissi chief Kai Londo and Suluku, both of whom dispatched warriors and weaponry to Bureh's rebels, who were engaged in fighting against Captain W. S. Sharpe, a district commissioner who had previously been engaged in enforcing the tax with the Sierra Leone Frontier Police. During the initial stages of the rebellion, Bureh's rebels were able to fight the British colonial forces to a standstill, with high casualties on both sides. The rebels also engaged in attacks on anyone suspected of collaborating with the British, murdering several including Creole trader Johnny Taylor, who was hacked to death by rebel forces.

Cardew responded to the rebellion by dispatching all the forces available to him to attack the rebels. However, after several months, the rebels still had not been defeated, which led him to order a scorched earth policy in response, which stipulated that villages and farmlands in rebel-controlled territory would be burnt. This new policy severely impacted Bureh's war effort, sharply reducing the amount of provisions available to feed his rebels. Eventually, Cardew's scorched earth policy led to Bureh abandoning the rebellion, surrendering to the British colonial government on 11 November 1898; the rebellion had lasted for approximately nine months. Despite British government officials recommending leniency to Bureh, Cardew had him (along with fellow rebels Kpana Lewis and Nyagua) sent into exile in the Gold Coast. Nine months after the rebellion, the colonial government convicted and executed ninety-six rebels which had been found guilty of murder by hanging. In 1905, Bureh was allowed by the British to return to Sierra Leone, where he reassumed his chieftaincy at the settlement of Kasseh. Bureh later gave an oral account of his experiences during the rebellion to Rev. Allen Elba, who sent an account to Cardew, although historians have often ignored this material.

== Mende revolt ==
The other rebellion was in the southeast, led by Mende chiefs including Momoh Jah, and warriors from the Sierra Leonean hinterland (joined by a small number of Sherbro) who also opposed the hut tax. The rebels attacked colonial officials and Creole merchants, with almost all "outsiders" (including European and Creole) seized and summarily executed, causing between 300 and 500 deaths. Although more fearsome than Bai Bureh's rising, it was amorphous, lacked a definite strategy. Cardew responded to the rebellion by dispatching a military force under Lieutenant-Colonel J. W. A. Marshall's command, which managed to defeat most of the rebeles within two months after numerous small-scale skirmishes. Most of the ninety-six rebels executed by hanging for murder nine months after the rebellion were Mende.

== Aftermath ==
For the British, the rebellion had been one of their larger colonial campaigns in West Africa during the Victorian era. Apart from support units and a 280-man strong naval brigade, British colonial forces consisted of detachments from the West India Regiments, the newly-formed West Africa Regiment, the Sierra Leone Frontier Police and local African levies. These forces combined suffered 67 killed and 184 wounded during the rebellion, in addition to the deaths of 90 African porters and an unknown number of casualties among the levies (which were not recorded). The defeat in the Hut Tax War ended large-scale organised armed opposition to colonialism in Sierra Leone. But resistance and opposition took other forms, particularly intermittent, wide-scale rioting and chaotic labour disturbances. Riots in 1955 and 1956 involved "many tens of thousands" of natives in the protectorate.
