= List of shipwrecks in September 1852 =

This list includes ships sunk, foundered, wrecked, grounded, or otherwise lost during September 1852.

== 1 September ==
List of shipwrecks: 1 September 1852
Ship	State	Description
Augustine Clara	Hamburg	The ship ran aground on the Haaks Bank, in the North Sea. She was on a voyage from Bordeaux, Gironde, France to Hamburg. She was refloated on 3 September and taken in to Den Helder, North Holland, Netherlands in a leaky condition.
Erin	United Kingdom	The schooner foundered in Morecambe Bay.

== 2 September ==
List of shipwrecks: 2 September 1852
Ship	State	Description
Ancona	United Kingdom	The ship ran aground off Burnham Overy Staithe, Norfolk. She was on a voyage from Kronstadt, Russia to Wisbech, Cambridgeshire. She was later refloated and towed in to Wisbech.
Citizen	United Kingdom	The steamship ran aground at Dublin. She was on a voyage from London to Dublin.
Panaja Evangelistria	Flag unknown	The ship sprang a leak and was beached west of Cape Spartivento, Sardinia. She was on a voyage from the Danube to Falmouth, Cornwall or Queenstown, County Cork, United Kingdom.

== 3 September ==
List of shipwrecks: 3 September 1852
Ship	State	Description
Eglinton	United Kingdom	The ship was wrecked on a reef off Fremantle, Swan River Colony with the loss of two lives. She was on a voyage from London to Australia.

== 4 September ==
List of shipwrecks: 4 September 1852
Ship	State	Description
Lion	United Kingdom	The steamship was lost at "Sand Heads".
Mary Phillips	United Kingdom	The ship was driven ashore at North Foreland, Kent. She was refloated and put in to Portsmouth, Hampshire.
Penelope	United Kingdom	The ship was driven ashore in Mairos Bay, Ottoman Empire. She had been refloated by 11 September.

== 5 September ==
List of shipwrecks: 5 September 1852
Ship	State	Description
Brandon	United Kingdom	The brig was abandoned in the Gulf of Bothnia. Her crew were rescued. She was subsequently taken in to Öland, Sweden.
Oscar	Russia	The brig was lost in the Gulf of Bothnia. Her crew were rescued.
System	United Kingdom	The full-rigged ship was driven ashore 6 nautical miles (11 km) from Tenedos, Ottoman Empire.

== 6 September ==
List of shipwrecks: 6 September 1852
Ship	State	Description
Highland Chief	United Kingdom	The brig was driven ashore at Dungeness, Kent. She was refloated.
Salus	United Kingdom	The ship was wrecked off Delos, Greece. She was on a voyage from Malta to Constantinople, Ottoman Empire.

== 7 September ==
List of shipwrecks: 7 September 1852
Ship	State	Description
Cyrus	United Kingdom	The ship was driven ashore and wrecked south of the Heugh Lighthouse, County Durham. She was on a voyage from Hamburg to Sunderland, County Durham.
Janet Gibson	United Kingdom	The ship was driven ashore and wrecked at the Headland of Hellners, Shetland Islands. She was on a voyage from Arkhangelsk, Russia to London.
Regina	Netherlands	The ship departed from Havana, Cuba for Rotterdam, South Holland. No further trace, presumed foundered with the loss of all hands.
Rob the Ranter	United Kingdom	The ship was driven ashore at Fenit, County Kerry. She was on a voyage from Troon, Ayrshire to Tralee, County Kerry. She was refloated.
Sandade	Portugal	The brig foundered in the Atlantic Ocean. Her crew were rescued. She was on a voyage from New York, United States to Porto.

== 8 September ==
List of shipwrecks: 8 September 1852
Ship	State	Description
Albatross	United Kingdom	The ship ran aground on the North Cross Sand and was damaged. She was on a voyage from Sunderland, County Durham to Schiedam, South Holland, Netherlands. She was refloated and towed in to Great Yarmouth, Norfolk.
Colombe	France	The ship was driven ashore near "Perellon". Her crew were rescued. She was on a voyage from Port-Vendres, Pyrénées-Orientales to Rio de Janeiro, Brazil.
Cupido	Norway	The ship ran aground in the River Tyne. She was on a voyage from Drammen to the River Tyne. She was refloated and taken in to South Shields, County Durham.
Enigheten	Sweden	The ship was driven ashore at Domsten. She was on a voyage from Hartlepool, County Durham to Landskrona. She was refloated and resumed her voyage.
Guardian	United Kingdom	The ship was driven ashore at Malahide, County Dublin. She was on a voyage from Liverpool, Lancashire to Rio de Janeiro, Brazil. She had been refloated by 11 September and was towed back to Liverpool.

== 9 September ==
List of shipwrecks: 9 September 1852
Ship	State	Description
Caledonia	United Kingdom	The tug sprang a leak and sank off the coast of Essex. All on board were rescued. She was refloated the next day and taken in to Colchester, Essex.
General Don	(United Kingdom of Great Britain and Ireland) Jersey	The ship ran aground on the Quern Sand. She was on a voyage from Jersey to Scarborough, Yorkshire. She was refloated with assistance from the lugger Surprise (United Kingdom) and taken in to Ramsgate, Kent.
Kron Prindsesse Josephine	Norway	The ship was driven ashore at Newburgh, Fife, United Kingdom. Her crew were rescued. She was on a voyage from Liebau, Prussia to Newburgh. She was refloated on 20 September and taken in to Aberdeen, United Kingdom for repairs.

== 10 September ==
List of shipwrecks: 10 September 1852
Ship	State	Description
Amy	United Kingdom	The schooner ran aground on the Hats and Barrels Rocks, in the Bristol Channel. She was refloated but sank in the Broad Sound. Her crew were rescued. She was on a voyage from Ipswich, Suffolk to Waterford.
Antilla	United States	The ship ran aground on the Great Pan Shoal. She was on a voyage from Singapore to New York. She was refloated the next day and resumed her voyage.
City of Hamburg	United Kingdom	The steamship ran aground on the Insand. She was on a voyage from London to South Shields, County Durham.
Lady of the Lake	United Kingdom	The smack was wrecked on the Clopora Rocks, off the coast of Anglesey. Her crew were rescued.
Mary	United Kingdom	The ship ran aground and sank off Sandhamn, Sweden. Her crew were rescued. She was on a voyage from Hartlepool, County Durham to Stockholm, Sweden.
Pandora	United Kingdom	The ship was driven ashore at Margate, Kent. She was on a voyage from Hartlepool, County Durham to Margate. She was refloated and taken in to Margate.

== 11 September ==
List of shipwrecks: 11 September 1852
Ship	State	Description
Baltic	United States	The ship was abandoned in the Atlantic Ocean. Her crew were rescued. She was on a voyage from Livorno, Grand Duchy of Tuscany to Philadelphia, Pennsylvania.
Duke	United Kingdom	The ship was driven ashore on the coast of Sicily. She was on a voyage from Galaţi, Ottoman Empire to Queenstown, County Cork.
Paolina	Kingdom of Lombardy–Venetia	The ship ran aground on the Barnard Sand, in the North Sea off the coast of Suffolk, United Kingdom. She was on a voyage from Newcastle upon Tyne, Northumberland, United Kingdom to Venice. She was refloated and taken in to Lowestoft, Suffolk in a leaky condition.
Pizarro	Spanish Navy	The Colón-class frigate was wrecked at Havana, Cuba.
Provident	United Kingdom	The ship ran aground and was damaged at Margate, Kent. She was on a voyage from Hartlepool, County Durham to Margate. She was refloated and taken in to Margate.
Vandringsmannen	Sweden	The ship ran aground off "Fogelon". She was on a voyage from London, United Kingdom to Jönsköping.

== 12 September ==
List of shipwrecks: 12 September 1852
Ship	State	Description
Chatham	United States	The schooner was wrecked 15 nautical miles (28 km) south of Saint Augustine, Florida. Her crew were rescued by the steamship Saint Augustine (United States).
Elises Minde	Norway	The ship was wrecked at Lemvig. Her crew were rescued. She was on a voyage from Hull, Yorkshire, United Kingdom to Christiansand.
Hoffnung	Hamburg	The ship collided with Benjamin Hewitson (United Kingdom) and sank at Helsingør, Denmark with the loss of her captain. She was on a voyage from Wick, Caithness, United Kingdom to Danzig.
Lady Ann	United Kingdom	The ship was holed by her anchor at Maldon, Essex.
Star	United Kingdom	The ship was driven ashore and severely damaged at Bideford, Devon.
Tar	United Kingdom	The schooner was wrecked on the Longsand, in the North Sea off the coast of Essex. Her crew were rescued by the smack Celerity and by John Manning (both United Kingdom). Tar was on a voyage from Newcastle upon Tyne, Northumberland to Saint-Valery-sur-Somme, Somme, France.

== 13 September ==
List of shipwrecks: 13 September 1852
Ship	State	Description
Eendraght	Duchy of Holstein	The ship was in collision with another vessel and sank in the North Sea. Her crew were rescued. She was on a voyage from Flensburg to Aberdeen, United Kingdom.
Empress	United Kingdom	The ship was driven against a battery and damaged at Kronstadt, Russia. She was on a voyage from Hull, Yorkshire to Kronstadt.
Hoffnung	Hamburg	The ship was in collision with Benjamin Hewitson (United Kingdom) and foundered off Helsingør, Denmark. She was on a voyage from Wick, Caithness, United Kingdom to Danzig. She was refloated on 13 September 1853 and taken in to Helsingør.
Sun	United Kingdom	The brig was driven ashore and severely damaged at St. Andrews, Fife. She was on a voyage from Quebec City, Province of Canada, British North America to Sunderland, County Durham. She was refloated on 5 October.

== 14 September ==
List of shipwrecks: 14 September 1850
Ship	State	Description
Caroline Augusta	Stralsund	The brig sprang a leak, capsized and sank off Texel, North Holland, Netherlands. Her crew were rescued. She was on a voyage from Plymouth, Devon, to Newcastle upon Tyne, Northumberland, United Kingdom to
Cleopatra	United Kingdom	The ship was driven ashore on Watling's Island, Bahamas. She was on a voyage from Demerara, British Guiana to Halifax, Nova Scotia, British North America. She was refloated.
Conside	United Kingdom	The ship was wrecked on the Lonsdale Reef with the loss of eight of the 150 people on board. She was on a voyage from Sydney, New South Wales to Melbourne, Victoria.
Dristigheden	Sweden	The ship was driven ashore at "Westerzarn", Gotland. She was on a voyage from Skellefteå to Copenhagen, Denmark.
Matilda	United Kingdom	The ship was driven ashore and wrecked on Gotland, Sweden. She was on a voyage from "Castro" to London.
Tweed	United Kingdom	The ship was driven ashore and wrecked on Hogland, Russia. She was on a voyage from Hartlepool, County Durham to Kronstadt, Russia.

== 15 September ==
List of shipwrecks: 15 September 1852
Ship	State	Description
Ellerslie	United States	The ship capsized at Alexandria, New York during a squall.
Mischief	United States	The ship sank in Long Island Sound. She was on a voyage from Málaga, Spain to New York.
Royal Adelaide	United Kingdom	The lugger was in collision with the brig Transit (United Kingdom) off the Dudgeon Sandbank, in the North Sea and was abandoned by five of her crew. The boat sent to rescue the remainder sank, and the two crew from Transit were rescued by Royal Adelaide, which subsequently put in to Lowestoft, Suffolk.

== 16 September ==
List of shipwrecks: 16 September 1852
Ship	State	Description
Bonne Mère	France	The ship ran aground on the Burrows Sand, in the North Sea off the coast of Essex, United Kingdom. She was refloated and taken in to Harwich, Essex in a leaky condition.
Darling	United Kingdom	The brig foundered in the Atlantic Ocean (44°04′N 41°20′W). Her crew were rescued by the full-rigged ship Cromwell (United Kingdom). Darling was on a voyage from London to New York, United States.
Gale	United Kingdom	The ship was holed by her anchor and sank at south Shields, County Durham. She had been refloated by 22 September and beached for repairs.
Jane Grey	United Kingdom	The barque ran aground on the Barnard Sand, in the North Sea off the coast of Suffolk. She was on a voyage from Sunderland, County Durham to Cartagena, Spain. She was refloated and resumed her voyage.
L'Olivier	France	The chasse-Marée sank off the Galloper Sandbank, in the North Sea off the coast of Suffolk, United Kingdom. Her crew were rescued. She was on a voyage from Dieppe, Seine-Inférieure to Blyth, Northumberland, United Kingdom.
Prospect	United Kingdom	The ship was in collision with the schooner Celeste Marie (France) and was abandoned in the North Sea off the coast of Norfolk. Her crew were rescued by Celeste Marie. Prospect was on a voyage from London to South Shields. She was taken in to Great Yarmouth, Norfolk.

== 17 September ==
List of shipwrecks: 17 September 1852
Ship	State	Description
Duchess of Argyll, and Emperor	United Kingdom	The paddle steamer Emperor collided with the steamship Duchess of Argyll and sank in Gare Loch at Shandon, Argyllshire. Duchess of Argyll was beached.
Firth	United Kingdom	The ship sank in the English Channel off Cap de la Hague, Manche, France. She was on a voyage from Charleston, South Carolina, United States to Hamburg.
Jemima	United Kingdom	The brig was fallen in with in distress in the Atlantic Ocean (46°54′N 15°45′W). A crew member was rescued by Agenoria (United Kingdom). The remaining nine of her crew were also reported to have been rescued. Jemima was on a voyage from Taganrog, Russia to Queenstown, County Cork.
Le Jeune Henri	France	The ship foundered in the English Channel off Jersey, Channel Islands with the loss of all but two of her crew. She was on a voyage from Honfleur, Calvados to Cádiz, Spain.
Mary Hunter	United Kingdom	The ship was driven ashore and wrecked at Great Yarmouth, Norfolk. She was on a voyage from Leeds, Yorkshire to Dover, Kent.
Pattison	United Kingdom	The brig collided with the chasse-marée Deux Sœurs (France) and sank off the Dudgeon Sandbank, in the North Sea with the loss of one of her four crew. Pattison was on a voyage from Sunderland, County Durham to London.
Sandade	Portugal	The brig foundered in the Atlantic Ocean. Her crew were rescued. She was on a voyage from New York, United States to Porto.

== 18 September ==
List of shipwrecks: 18 September 1852
Ship	State	Description
Antje	Netherlands	The ship departed from London, United Kingdom for Helsingør, Denmark. No further trace, presumed foundered with the loss of all hands.
Belle	United Kingdom	The ship was driven ashore in Mira Boyle Bay. She was on a voyage from Halifax, Nova Scotia to Sydney, Nova Scotia, British North America.
Bhurtpoor	United Kingdom	The ship was wrecked on the Long Bank, in the Irish Sea with the loss of five of the 520 people on board. About 60 of the survivors were rescued by the oyster boat Teetotaller (United Kingdom). Bhurtpoor was on a voyage from Liverpool, Lancashire to New Orleans, Louisiana United States and/or Rio de Janeiro, Brazil.
Dart	United Kingdom	The schooner sank in the English Channel 7 nautical miles (13 km) west of The Lizard, Cornwall. Her five crew were rescued by Anna (United Kingdom). Dart was on a voyage from Fowey, Cornwall to Cardiff, Glamorgan.
Isabella	United Kingdom	The ship was abandoned in the Atlantic Ocean. Her crew were rescued. She was on a voyage from Galaţi, Ottoman Empire to Falmouth, Cornwall or Queenstown, County Cork.
Johanna Catharina	United Kingdom	The ship ran aground in the Victoria Channel. She was on a voyage from Liverpool to Rio de Janeiro, Brazil.
Mail	United Kingdom	The steamship ran aground in Liverpool Bay. She was on a voyage from Dublin to Liverpool. She was refloated and resumed her voyage.
Selah	United Kingdom	The ship was wrecked at Porthdinllaen, Caernarfonshire. Her crew were rescued.
Wellington	United Kingdom	The ship was abandoned in the Atlantic Ocean. Her crew were rescued by Fleetwood (United Kingdom). Wellington was on a voyage from Saldanha Bay to Queenstown.

== 19 September ==
List of shipwrecks: 19 September 1852
Ship	State	Description
Alert	United Kingdom	The schooner was driven ashore and wrecked near Sunderland, County Durham. Her crew were rescued. She was on a voyage from Bridport, Dorset to Sunderland.
Alette	Kingdom of Hanover	The ship ran aground in the Oste. She was on a voyage from Drochtersen to Emden.
Felix	United Kingdom	The ship was driven ashore and severely damaged at Banff, Aberdeenshire. She was on a voyage from Newcastle upon Tyne, Northumberland to Banff. She was refloated on 22 September and taken in to Banff.
John Callum	United Kingdom	The ship was wrecked south of Aberdeen. She was on a voyage from Aberdeen to Havana, Cuba.
Josina Wilhelmina	Netherlands	The ship was driven ashore at Rønne, Denmark. Her crew were rescued.
Louise	United Kingdom	The ship was driven ashore at Memel, Prussia. Her crew were rescued. She was on a voyage from Newcastle upon Tyne, Northumberland to Memel. She had become a wreck by 22 September.
Progress	United Kingdom	The ship ran aground on the Binks, off the mouth of the Humber. Her crew were rescued by the Spurn Point Lifeboat. She was refloated with the assistance of a tug and towed in to Grimsby, Lincolnshire in a leaky condition.
William	United Kingdom	The ship was abandoned off Copinsay, Orkney Islands. She was on a voyage from Arkhangelsk, Russia to a British port. She was refloated and taken in to Deen Sound.

== 20 September ==
List of shipwrecks: 20 September 1852
Ship	State	Description
Commerce	United Kingdom	The ship caught fire and put in to St. David's, Fife where she was scuttled. She was on a voyage from Sunderland, County Durham to Aberdeen. She subsequently became a wreck.
Edward and Mary	United Kingdom	The ship ran aground and sank off the "Skarfsatcheree", in the Baltic Sea. Her crew were rescued. She was on a voyage from South Shields, County Durham to Saint Petersburg, Russia.
Felix	United Kingdom	The ship ran aground and was severely damaged at Banff, Aberdeenshire. She was on a voyage from Newcastle upon Tyne, Northumberland to Banff.
James	United Kingdom	The ship ran aground off Yarmouth, Isle of Wight. She was on a voyage from Newport, Monmouthshire to Southampton, Hampshire.
Jane	United Kingdom	The ship was driven ashore on Saaremaa, Russia. She was on a voyage from Hartlepool, County Durham to Kronstadt, Russia.
Liberty	United Kingdom	The schooner ran aground on the Binks, off the mouth of the Humber. She was on a voyage from Teignmouth, Devon to Newcastle upon Tyne. She was refloated and towed in to Grimsby, Lincolnshire.
Michele	Greece	The brig was driven ashore and wrecked at Carnsore Point, County Wexford, United Kingdom with the loss of three or four lives. She was on a voyage from Liverpool, Lancashire, United Kingdom to Constantinople, Ottoman Empire.
Navigateur	France	The ship was driven ashore at Buenos Aires, Argentina.
Orange Boven	United Kingdom	The ship was wrecked. She was on a voyage from Middlesbrough to Whitby, Yorkshire.
Protheroe	United Kingdom	The schooner was driven ashore at Easington, Yorkshire. Her crew were rescued. She was on a voyage from Dieppe, Seine-Inférieure, France to Whitby. Protheroe was refloated on 18 October and towed in to Whitby by the tug Samson (United Kingdom).
Providence	United Kingdom	The ship ran aground on the Holm Sand, in the North Sea off the coast of Suffolk. She was on a voyage from Goole, Yorkshire to London. She was refloated and taken in to Lowestoft, Suffolk in a leaky condition.
Titania	United Kingdom	The ship was wrecked on the Rob Roy Shoal. Her crew were rescued. She was on a voyage from Macao, China to Sydney, New South Wales.
Violet	United Kingdom	The ship was driven ashore at the mouth of the River Spey.

== 21 September ==
List of shipwrecks: 21 September 1852
Ship	State	Description
Agnes	United Kingdom	The ship was driven ashore at Padstow, Cornwall. She was on a voyage from Gallipoli, Ottoman Empire to Bristol, Gloucestershire. She was refloated and taken in to Padstow.
Auguste Bertha	Prussia	The ship was driven ashore on Ageroven Island, off Molde, Norway. Her crew were rescued. She was on a voyage from the Onega River to Hull, Yorkshire, United Kingdom.
Aunt Sarah	United Kingdom	The ship was driven ashore on Saaremaa, Russia. She was on a voyage from Hull to Kronstadt, Russia.
Bolivar	United Kingdom	The barque was driven ashore at Vlissingen, Zeeland, Netherlands. She was on a voyage from Antwerp, Belgium to Newport, Monmouthshire.
Britannia	United Kingdom	The schooner ran aground on the Red Sand, off the north coast of Kent, Her crew were rescued. She was on a voyage from Caen, Calvados, France to London. She was refloated with assistance from the smacks Prosperous and Sydney (both United Kingdom) taken in to Whitstable, Kent in a derelict condition.
Clure	United Kingdom	The ship was driven ashore at Hartlepool, County Durham. Her crew were rescued. She was on a voyage from London to Sunderland, County Durham.
Ellen	United Kingdom	The ship was beached at Milford Haven, Pembrokeshire. She was on a voyage from Dublin to London. She was refloated and taken in the Milford Haven.
Frankfort Packet	United Kingdom	The ship was driven ashore and wrecked near Dunbar, Lothian. Her crew were rescued. She was on a voyage from London to Inverkeithing, Fife.
Hercules	United Kingdom	The ship was driven ashore and wrecked at Hartlepool. Her crew were rescued. She was on a voyage from London to South Shields, County Durham.
Jante Nanninga	Netherlands	The galiot foundered in the Atlantic Ocean off the coast of Portugal. Her crew were rescued. She was on a voyage from Cartagena, Spain to Newcastle upon Tyne, Northumberland, United Kingdom.
Maria	Denmark	The galiot was in collision with Peace (United Kingdom) and was abandoned in the North Sea 4 nautical miles (7.4 km) east north east of Flamborough Head, Yorkshire. Her crew were rescued by Peace, which towed Maria in to Bridlington, Yorkshire in a derelict condition.
Olive	United Kingdom	The ship was driven ashore at Seaton, County Durham. Her crew were rescued. She was on a voyage from London to Sunderland, County Durham.
Providence	United Kingdom	The ship was driven ashore and wrecked north of Souter Point, County Durham.
Sarah	United Kingdom	The ship sank off Cape Clear Island, County Cork. Her crew were rescued by John and Isabella (United Kingdom). Sarahwas on a voyage from Brǎila, Ottoman Empire to Queenstown, County Cork.
Unity	United Kingdom	The ship sank in St. Bride's Bay.
Venus	Denmark	The ship was wrecked. She was on a voyage from Oulu, Grand Duchy of Finland to Copenhagen.

== 22 September ==
List of shipwrecks: 22 September 1852
Ship	State	Description
Albert Courrier de la Manche	Belgium	The ship was sighted off Falmouth, Cornwall, United Kingdom whilst on a voyage from Berdyansk, Russia to Antwerp. No further trace, presumed foundered with the loss of all hands.
Ann Eliza	United Kingdom	The ship driven ashore at Bridlington, Yorkshire.
Britannia	United Kingdom	The ship ran aground on the Middle Sand, in the North Sea off the coast of Essex and was abandoned.
Elizabeth	Grand Duchy of Oldenburg	The ship was driven ashore and wrecked at Lossiemouth, Moray, United Kingdom. She was on a voyage from Leith, Lothian to Lossiemouth.
Frau Mette	Denmark	The ship was abandoned in the North Sea. Her crew were rescued by Carl Johan (Sweden). She was on a voyage from Hartlepool, County Durham, United Kingdom to Nykjøbing.
Friends	United Kingdom	The schooner ran aground on the Herd Sand, in the North Sea off the coast of County Durham and was severely damaged. Her crew were rescued by the South Shields Lifeboat. She was on a voyage from Sunderland, County Durham to Port Gordon, Aberdeenshire. She was refloated on 25 September.
Lark	United Kingdom	The ship was driven ashore at Magilligan Point, County Londonderry. Her crew were rescued.
Mary	United Kingdom	The ship was driven ashore and wrecked at the mouth of the Narva River with the loss of all hands, barring her captain, who was ashore.
Mercury	United Kingdom	The ship was abandoned at sea. Her crew were rescued. She was on a voyage from Newcastle upon Tyne, Northumberland to Copenhagen, Denmark.
Orchard	United Kingdom	The ship was driven ashore at Horn Head, County Donegal. She was on a voyage from Glasgow, Renfrewshire to Dunfanaghy, County Donegal.
Providence	United Kingdom	The ship was wrecked on the Herd Sand. Her crew were rescued by the South Shields Lifeboat.
Sally	United Kingdom	The ship was driven ashore near Portreath, Cornwall. She was on a voyage from Liverpool, Lancashire to a Spanish port.
Sylph	United States	The ship ran aground a Liverpool, Nova Scotia, British North America. She was on a voyage from Boston, Massachusetts to Liverpool. She was refloated and taken in to Liverpool in a leaky condition.
Vasco de Gama	Flag unknown	The ship was driven ashore in the Scheldt. She was on a voyage from Antwerp, Belgium to Amsterdam, North Holland, Netherlands.
William and Sally	United Kingdom	The ship ran aground and was severely damaged on the Herd Sand. Her crew were rescued by the South Shields Lifeboat. She was on a voyage from Stettin to Dundee, Forfarshire. She was refloated on 25 September.

== 23 September ==
List of shipwrecks: 23 September 1852
Ship	State	Description
Barbara	United States	The ship was wrecked north of the mouth of the Rio Grande. Some of her crew were rescued, others were reported missing. She was on a voyage from New York to Panama City, Republic of New Granada.
Frehel	France	The ship was lost at "Marvim", Brazil. Her crew were rescued.
Gem	United Kingdom	The brig was wrecked in a hurricane. Her crew were rescued. She was on a voyage from Philadelphia, Pennsylvania to Jamaica.
Jeannette	Netherlands	The ship departed from Alexandria, Egypt for Amsterdam, North Holland. No further trace, presumed foundered with the loss of all hands.
Ortolan	United Kingdom	The ship was driven ashore at Cranberry Head, Nova Scotia, British North America. She was on a voyage from London to Quebec City, Province of Canada, British North America.
Radford	United Kingdom	The ship was driven ashore and wrecked west of Alt Skagen, Denmark. Her crew were rescued. She was on a voyage from Newcastle upon Tyne, Northumberland to Kronstadt, Russia.
Sarah and Mary	United Kingdom	The ship sank in the North Sea off Huntcliff Foot, Yorkshire.
Sarah Jane	United Kingdom	The ship was wrecked off "Rothskar", Russia. Her crew were rescued.
Serus	United Kingdom	The ship was wrecked in Mira Bay. She was on a voyage from Pugwash, Nova Scotia, British North America to Liverpool, Lancashire.

== 24 September ==
List of shipwrecks: 24 September 1852
Ship	State	Description
Alwina	Stettin	The ship struck a floating wreck and foundered in the Baltic Sea east of Falsterbo, Sweden. Her crew were rescued. She was on a voyage from Helmsdale, Sutherland, United Kingdom to Stettin.
Dryope	United Kingdom	The ship was wrecked near Sydney, Nova Scotia, British North America.
Elidia	Kingdom of Hanover	The ship was lost on the coast of Stad, Norway. Her crew were rescued.
Isabella	(United Kingdom of Great Britain and Ireland) British North America	The ship was wrecked at Bridgewater, Nova Scotia.
Maidstone	United Kingdom	The barque was wrecked near Sydney, Nova Scotia. She was on a voyage from Sunderland, County Durham to the Saint Lawrence River.
Nordlandstrand	Lübeck	The ship was driven ashore on Grönskär, Sweden. She was on a voyage from Lübeck to "Westewik".
Oberon	Stettin	The ship was driven east of Cammin, Rostock. She was on a voyage from Bahia, Brazil to Stettin. She was subsequently declared a total loss.
Oscar	Stettin	The ship foundered in the Dogger Bank. Her crew were rescued by a Norwegian vessel. She was on a voyage from Hull, Yorkshire, United Kingdom to Stettin.
Ormonde	United Kingdom	The ship was wrecked on Saaremaa, Russia. She was on a voyage from Newcastle upon Tyne, Northumberland to Kronstadt, Russia.
Series	(United Kingdom of Great Britain and Ireland) British North America	The ship was wrecked in Merce Bay.
Stantons	United Kingdom	The ship struck a sunken rock and was damaged at Trondheim, Norway. She was on a voyage from Arkhangelsk, Russia to Topsham, Devon.

== 25 September ==
List of shipwrecks: 25 September 1852
Ship	State	Description
Arthur Leary	United Kingdom	The brig was abandoned in the Atlantic Ocean. Her crew were rescued by Clara (United States). Arthur Leary was on a voyage from Saint Domingo to Boston, Massachusetts, United States.
Caroline Maria	United Kingdom	The ship was driven ashore at "Mangaree", Cape Breton Island, Nova Scotia, British North America. She was on a voyage from Quebec City, Province of Canada, British North America to Bantry Island, County Cork. She was consequently condemned.
Citizen	United States	This American whaler in the Arctic had been lying-to in a gale for four days when the depth began to shoal and before they could get under way she grounded on a sand bank and was lost. The sea being too rough for the boats, five men were drowned using spars to get ashore. They survived with hospitality from the indigenous people. Between February and April 1853 some parties attempted the 225 miles (362 km) to Cape Dezhnev cross the ice, the remainder were rescued by the Joseph Haydon (Bremen) on 2 July who had heard of the wreck and had been searching for them.

== 26 September ==
List of shipwrecks: 26 September 1852
Ship	State	Description
Caroline Maria	Stralsund	The brig was driven ashore and wrecked at "Margavie", Cape Breton Island, Nova Scotia, British North America. She was on a voyage from Quebec City, Province of Canada, British North America to Bantry Bay.
Fortuna	Duchy of Holstein	The ship sank 1.5 nautical miles (2.8 km) off the Marien Leuchte Lighthouse, Fehmarn, Duchy of Schleswig. Her crew were rescued. She was on a voyage from Rostock to London, United Kingdom.
Kincardineshire	United Kingdom	The brig was wrecked north of Trondheim Norway. Her eight crew survived. She was on a voyage from Arkhangelsk, Russia to Aberdeen.
Schembre	Russia	The ship ran aground on the Arklow Bank, in the Irish Sea off the coast of County Wicklow, United Kingdom. She was refloated on 29 September.

== 27 September ==
List of shipwrecks: 28 September 1852
Ship	State	Description
Fraternite	France	The schooner was wrecked on a coral reef off "Tapuna".
Kleine Ferdinand	Danzig	The ship sprang a leak and sank off "Rikhofden". Her crew were rescued. She was on a voyage from Danzig to Hull, Yorkshire, United Kingdom.
Martha	United Kingdom	The ship foundered in the North Sea off Dimlington, Yorkshire. Her crew were rescued. She was on a voyage from Sunderland, County Durham to Portsmouth, Hampshire.
HMS Rolla	United Kingdom	The Cherokee-class brig-sloop was driven ashore at Portsmouth, Hampshire. She was refloated on 28 September.

== 28 September ==
List of shipwrecks: 28 September 1852
Ship	State	Description
Alert	United Kingdom	The brig was driven ashore at Filey, Yorkshire. She was on a voyage from Rouen, Seine-Inférieure, France to Yorkshire. She was refloated on 2 October and taken in to Scarborough, Yorkshire.
Bethseda	United Kingdom	The brig was driven ashore at Seaton Carew, County Durham.
Emer	Denmark	The galiot was driven ashore and damaged at Seaton Carew. She was refloated on 17 October. The tug Pilot (United Kingdom) towed her in to Stockton-on-Tees, County Durham for repairs.
Hannah	United Kingdom	The Yorkshire billyboy was driven ashore at Shoreham-by-Sea, Sussex. All on board were rescued by the Coast Guard. She was on a voyage from Goole, Yorkshire to Shoreham-by-Sea. She was refloated on 13 October.
Maria	Duchy of Holstein	The ship foundered in the North Sea off Texel, North Holland, Netherlands with the loss of her captain. Survivors were rescued by the galiot Diana (Kingdom of Hanover). Maria was on a voyage from Hartlepool, County Durham to Föhr.
Sarah	United Kingdom	The brig was driven ashore at the Poolbeg Lighthouse, County Dublin with the loss of at least four lives.
Suffolk	United Kingdom	The barque was driven ashore at Seaton Carew.
Weljet	(Russian Empire) Grand Duchy of Finland	The ship was driven ashore and wrecked near Umeå, Sweden. She was on a voyage from Hull, Yorkshire, United Kingdom to Oulu.

== 29 September ==
List of shipwrecks: 29 September 1852
Ship	State	Description
Ann and Mary	United Kingdom	The ship was run into by Herald (United Kingdom) and was damaged at Dublin. She was on a voyage from Llanelly, Glamorgan to Dunkirk, Nord, France.
Carrs	United Kingdom	The brig was driven ashore at Moelfre, Anglesey. Her crew were rescued by a lifeboat. She was on a voyage from Liverpool, Lancashire to Newcastle upon Tyne, Northumberland. Carrs had become a wreck by 4 October.
Celerity	United Kingdom	The schooner was driven ashore and wrecked in Robin Hoods Bay. Her crew were rescued. She was on a voyage from Hamburg to Fraserburgh, Aberdeenshire.
Charles Hamilton	United Kingdom	The collier, a brig, was driven ashore at Baldoyle, County Dublin. Her five crew were rescued.
Eclipse	United Kingdom	The ship was holed by an anchor and sank at Poole, Dorset. She was on a voyage from Poole to London. She was refloated the next day.
Elizabeth	United Kingdom	The ship was driven ashore at Seaford, Sussex.
Emporium	United States	The ship was driven ashore and wrecked at Blyth, Northumberland. All on board were rescued.
Harmony	United Kingdom	The ship was driven ashore and severely damaged at Douglas, Isle of Man. She was on a voyage from Arendal, Norway to Douglas. She was refloated on 10 October.
Harriet	United Kingdom	The sloop was driven ashore and wrecked on Puffin Island with the loss of all on board. She was on a voyage from Liverpool to Bangor, Caernarfonshire.
Herald	United Kingdom	The paddle steamer was in collision with several vessels at Kingstown and was severely damaged. She was on a voyage from Dublin to Glasgow, Renfrewshire.
Industry	United Kingdom	The ship was run into by Herald (United Kingdom) and was damaged at Dublin. She was on a voyage from Newport, Monmouthshire to Newry, County Antrim.
Isabella	United Kingdom	The ship was abandoned in the Atlantic Ocean. Her crew were rescued. She was on a voyage from Baltimore, Maryland, United States to Belfast, County Antrim.
James Hamilton	United Kingdom	The brig was driven ashore and wrecked at Dublin. Her crew survived. She was on a voyage from Troon, Ayrshire to Dublin.
John and Thomas	United Kingdom	The ship ran aground in the Stanford Channel. She was refloated and taken in to Great Yarmouth, Norfolk in a leaky condition.
Lamont	United Kingdom	The ship ran aground on the Varne Sandbank, in the North Sea. She was on a voyage from Newcastle upon Tyne to Marseille, Bouches-du-Rhône, France. She was refloated and taken in to Ramsgate, Kent in a leaky condition.
Maria and Fanny	United Kingdom	The brig was driven ashore at Kingstown, County Dublin.
Minerva	United Kingdom	The ship was run into by Herald (United Kingdom) and was damaged at Dublin. She was on a voyage from Liverpool to Drogheda, County Louth.
Mobile	United States	The ship was wrecked on the Arklow Bank, in the Irish Sea off the coast of County Wicklow with the loss of 70 lives. Survivors were rescued by the schooner Mary Elizabeth (United Kingdom) and another schooner. Mobile was on a voyage from Liverpool to New Orleans, Louisiana.
Orion	United Kingdom	The ship was run into by Herald (United Kingdom) and was damaged at Dublin.
Prince of Wales	United Kingdom	The sloop was wrecked at Rhyl, Denbighshire. Her crew were rescued.
Providence	Sweden	The ship was driven ashore at Dungeness, Kent, United Kingdom. Her crew were rescued. She was on a voyage from Rouen, Seine-Inférieure, France to a Norwegian port.
Richard and Hannah	United Kingdom	The ship was abandoned in the North Sea between Texel, North Holland, Netherlands and the Lemon and Ower Sand. Her crew were rescued by a boat from Sylphide (Flag unknown) but the boat capsized with the loss of all but two of Richard and Hannah's crew and two crew from Sylphide.
San José	Portugal	The schooner was driven ashore at San Francisco, California, United States.
Smyrna	United Kingdom	The brig was driven ashore and wrecked at the Poolbeg Lighthouse, Dublin with the loss of all five crew. She was on a voyage from Workington, Cumberland to Dublin.
Thomas	United Kingdom	The ship ran aground on the Newcombe Sand, in the North Sea off the coast of Suffolk. She was on a voyage from Newcastle upon Tyne to Dieppe, Seine-Inférieure, France. She was refloated and taken in to Great Yarmouth, Norfolk in a leaky condition.
Welcome Home	United Kingdom	The schooner was run into by Philomel (Flag unknown). She was holed by an anchor and sank in the River Wear. She was later refloated and taken in to Sunderland, County Durham.
William and Margaret	United Kingdom	The ship was run into by Herald (United Kingdom) and was damaged at Dublin.

== 30 September ==
List of shipwrecks: 30 September 1852
Ship	State	Description
Cleveland	United Kingdom	The ship ran aground on the Herd Sand, in the North Sea off the coast of County Durham. She was on a voyage from Kirkwall, Orkney Islands to Newcastle upon Tyne, Northumberland. She was refloated.
Concordia	Netherlands	The ship sank in the North Sea off Heligoland. Her crew were rescued. She was on a voyage from Harlingen, Friesland to a Norwegian port.
Dolphin	United Kingdom	The ship sloop was driven ashore at Lossiemouth, Moray. She was on a voyage from Kirkwall to Dundee, Forfarshire.
Edinburgh	United Kingdom	The ship was driven ashore at Newhaven, Sussex.
Martha	United Kingdom	The brig sprang a leak and sank in the North Sea off Dimlington, Yorkshire. Her crew were rescued.
Reliance	United Kingdom	The ship was wrecked in Polinga Bay. Her crew were rescued. She was on a voyage from Livorno, Grand Duchy of Tuscany to Cardiff, Glamorgan.
Thetis	United Kingdom	The schooner was in collision with the steamship Fanny (United Kingdom) in the English Channel off Dungeness, Kent and was severely damaged. Her crew were rescued by Fanny. Thetis was on a voyage from Liverpool, Lancashire to Great Yarmouth, Norfolk. She taken in to Ramsgate, Kent on 1 October in a derelict condition.
Wave Queen	United Kingdom	The steamship was driven ashore at Newhaven. All on board, about 150 people, were rescued. She was on a voyage from Dieppe, Seine-Inférieure, France to Newhaven. Wave Queen was refloated on 11 October.

== Unknown date ==
List of shipwrecks: Unknown date in September 1852
Ship	State	Description
Abraham	United Kingdom	The ship ran aground on the Herd Sand, in the North Sea off the coast of County Durham before 20 September. She was refloated and taken in to South Shields in a leaky condition.
Adventure	United Kingdom	The schooner was wrecked at Angra Pequena, Cape Colony before 29 September.
Alderman	United States	The schooner was wrecked whilst on a voyage from Mobile, Alabama to New Orleans, Louisiana. All on board were rescued.
Arhcibald	France	The ship was lost near Matanzas, Cuba before 15 September. She was on a voyage form Bordeaux, Gironde to New Orleans.
Bonne Hèlène	France	The ship was wrecked. She was on a voyage from Rabat, Morocco to Marseille, Bouches-du-Rhône, France.
Calliope	United Kingdom	The ship was driven ashore on the coast of Sicily. She was on a voyage from Brǎila, Ottoman Empire to Queenstown, County Cork. She was refloated and taken in to Palermo, Sicily in a severely leaky condition.
Catherine and Anne	United Kingdom	The schooner departed from a Baltic port for and English port. No further trace, presumed foundered with the loss of all hands.
Charlotte	United Kingdom	The ship was wrecked on the Prata Shoal. Her crew survived. She was on a voyage from Madras, India to Whampoa, China.
Cyrena S. Colby	United States	The fishing schooner was lost at Cascumpec, Prince Edward Island. Crew saved.
Enchantress	United Kingdom	The ship was wrecked on a reef in the Atlantic Ocean with the loss of five of her eleven crew. Survivors were rescued by Richard (United Kingdom). Enchantress was on a voyage from Pernambuco, Brazil to Falmouth, Cornwall.
Endeavour	United Kingdom	The ship was driven ashore on the Burial Rocks. She was on a voyage from Glasgow, Renfrewshire to Calais, France. She was refloated and taken in to Portmadoc, Caernarfonshire, where she arrived on 7 September.
Expeditious	United Kingdom	The cutter was wrecked on the coast of Grand Bassa, Liberia.
Fairfield	United Kingdom	The ship was driven ashore and wrecked 110 nautical miles (200 km) east of Port Natal, Cape Colony with the loss of sixteen of her 23 crew. She was on a voyage from Calcutta, India to Liverpool, Lancashire.
Helenas	United Kingdom	The ship was driven ashore in the Dardanelles. She was on a voyage from Odesa to Falmouth, Cornwall. She was refloated and taken in to Tenedos, Ottoman Empire for repairs.
Iginia	United Kingdom	The ship was driven ashore at Cape Granitola, Sicily. She was on a voyage from Alexandria, Egypt to Liverpool. She was refloated and put in to Malta, where she arrived on 16 September.
Jane Howard	United Kingdom	The ship was wrecked at Los Realejos, Canary Islands.
Johann Christoph	Russia	The ship was wrecked. Her crew were rescued. She was on a voyage from Bordeaux, Gironde, France to Kronstadt.
Margherita	Flag unknown	The ship was wrecked in the Bosphorus before 23 September. She was on a voyage from the Danube to a British port.
Messager	France	The steamship was lost off Lota, Chile. All on board were rescued. She was on a voyage from Valparaíso, Chile to Talcahuano, Chile and Lota.
Queen Pomare	United Kingdom	The ship was driven ashore near Musquash, New Brunswick, British North America. She was on a voyage from Liverpool, Lancashire to Saint John, New Brunswick. She was refloated and taken in to Saint John.
Raisbeck	United Kingdom	The ship was driven ashore on the south point of Öland, Sweden. She was on a voyage from Swinemünde, Prussia to Umeå, Sweden. Raisbeck was refloated and put in to Kalmar, where she arrived on 11 September.
Scio	United Kingdom	The ship was wrecked in the Black Sea at "Carabourna" with the loss of six of her crew. She was on a voyage from the Danube to an English port.
Sexes	United States	The brig was abandoned in the Batan Islands, Spanish East Indies. Her crew survived. She was on a voyage from San Francisco, California to Hong Kong.
Swift	United Kingdom	The ship ran aground and was damaged. She was refloated and taken in to Kronstadt, where she had arrived by 21 September.
Virginie	France	The ship was driven ashore at Humacao, Puerto Rico before 15 September. She was on a voyage from Saint Thomas, Virgin Islands to Ciudad del Carmen, Mexico.
Zeitun	Kingdom of Naples	The ship was wrecked on a reef in the Rabbit Islands, Ottoman Empire. Her crew were rescued.
