= Gallinas River (Sierra Leone) =

River in Sierra Leone

The Gallinas River in Sierra Leone reaches the Atlantic between Cape Saint Ann and Grand Cape Mount.

Strictly speaking, the Gallinas River is an archaic term for the Kerefe stream in modern Sierra Leone (7°0′52″N 11°37′29″W), which lies a few miles west of the Moa River. However, it could be applied to any of many interconnected streams or channels into the marshy backwaters of this region. In the widest sense, the "Gallinas River" refers generally to the stretch of coast, covered by dense mangrove swamps, between the Kerefe and the Mano River.

The term comes from the Portuguese "Rio das Galinhas" (River of Hens), referring to Guinea fowl that were found by its banks. The first Portuguese explorer to reach the region was Pedro de Sintra in 1461 or 1462. The name "Rio das Galinhas" is found in Duarte Pacheco Pereira's Esmeraldo de Situ Orbis (written c.1509). The term was later applied as an exonym to the inhabitants of the area, the Gallinas people, who dominated the coastal region between roughly the Waanji river to the west and the Mano River to the east.

== Slave trade history ==
The area was infamous in the 1800s for its active participation in the Atlantic slave trade under the Gallinas people.

The Gallinas area was actually not very active in the slave trade, or any kind of trade for that matter, before this time. Its forbidding dense mangrove swamps and relatively sparse population, led the Gallinas River to be largely overlooked by European traders. During the heyday of the slave trade, the major entrepots in the region were elsewhere, notably at Bunce Island, Sherbro Island, and Cape Mount. It is only towards the end of the 18th Century, as demand for slaves kept rising, that slave traders took an interest in previously marginal areas like the Gallinas River. After the British ban on the slave trade in 1808, closing down the major depots, the obscurity of the Gallinas River allowed slave traders to continue their activities there.

Pedro Blanco, a notorious Spanish slave trader, was based on the coast of Sierra Leone at Gallinas between 1822 and 1838.

In 1840 Richard Doherty, the Governor of Sierra Leone, discovered that Fry Norman, a Black British subject and her child were being held as slaves on the islands at the mouth of the Gallinas River, which prompted Lieutenant Joseph Denman commanding the Wanderer to force the king to free Norman and abolish the slave trade in his dominions. Denman promptly sailed up the Gallinas River to destroy Spanish slave barracoons.
