= Edward Merewether =

British colonial administrator

Sir Edward Marsh Merewether KCMG KCVO
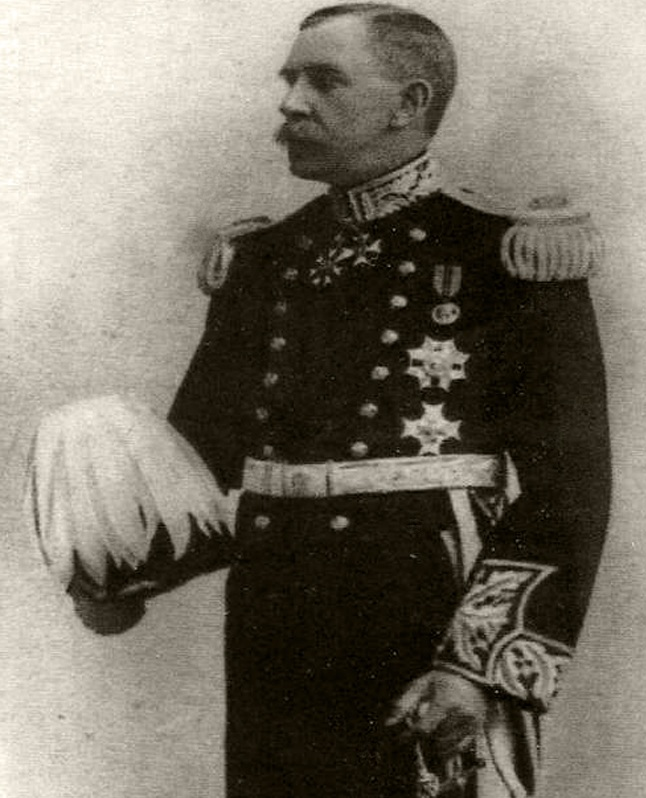

Governor of the Leeward Islands
- In office 1916–1921
- Preceded by: Sir Henry Hesketh Bell
- Succeeded by: Eustace Fiennes

Governor of Sierra Leone
- In office 8 March 1911 – January 1916
- Monarch: George V
- Preceded by: Sir Leslie Probyn
- Succeeded by: Sir Richard James Wilkinson

Lieutenant Governor and Chief Secretary of Malta
- In office 1902–1911
- Monarchs: Edward VII; George V
- Preceded by: Sir Gerald Strickland (as Chief Secretary)
- Succeeded by: John Clauson (as Chief Secretary)

Personal details
- Born: 9 September 1858 Meriden, Warwickshire, England, United Kingdom
- Died: 28 December 1938 (aged 80) Kensington, London, England
- Spouse: Honoria Clementina Mary Braddell
- Relations: Thomas Braddell (Father-in-law)
- Parents: Major General Sir William Merewether (father); Harriett Dale (mother)
- Relatives: Henry Alworth Merewether (grandfather), Edward Christopher Merewether (uncle)
- Education: Harrow School

Sir Edward Marsh Merewether, KCMG, KCVO (9 September 1858 – 28 December 1938) was a British colonial administrator.

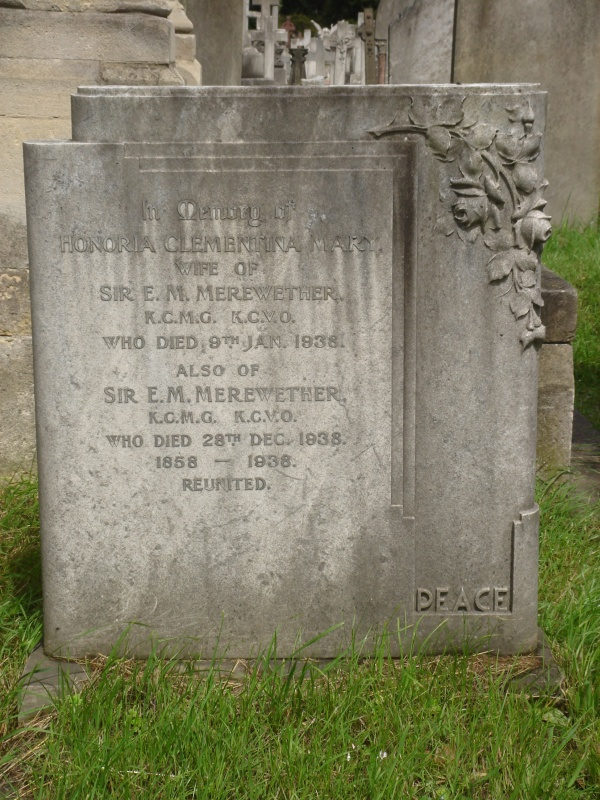
Funerary monument, Brompton Cemetery, London

== Early life and background ==
Merewether was born in Meriden, Warwickshire, England on 9 September 1858, the second son of British Indian Army officer Major General Sir William Merewether (1825–1880) and Harriett Dale. His grandfather was the Serjeant-at-law and Town Clerk of London, Henry Alworth Merewether (1780–1864). His uncle, Edward Christopher Merewether (1820–1893), was a prominent civil servant and businessman in the Colony of New South Wales and for whom the municipality (today a suburb) of Merewether was named. Merewether was educated at Harrow School.

== Colonial career ==
=== Straits Settlements ===
After passing the civil service exam, Merewether was accepted as a cadet in the Straits Settlements Civil Service (SSCC) in 1880 and rose to become Superintendent of the Census in 1891 and Inspector of Prisons in 1893. As Assistant Colonial Secretary and Clerk of Councils from 1897, he acted on two occasions as resident Councillor and Colonial Treasurer in Malacca. In 1901 he was appointed as Resident Minister to the Sultan of Selangor, Alauddin Sulaiman Shah. For his service in the colony he was made a Companion of the Order of Saint Michael and Saint George (CMG) in the November 1902 Birthday Honours list.

In 1883 he married Honoria Clementina Mary Braddell, the daughter of the first Attorney-General of Singapore, Sir Thomas Braddell.

=== Malta ===
Merewether was appointed Lieutenant Governor and Chief Secretary to the Government of Malta in May 1902, serving until 1911. He arrived in Malta on 21 August 1902 to take up the position. On the occasion of King Edward VII's visit to the island the following year, he was made a Commander of the Royal Victorian Order (CVO) on 21 April 1903. When the King visited Malta again in April 1907, Merewether was promoted to Knight Commander of the Royal Victorian Order (KCVO).

=== Sierra Leone ===
In March 1911, Merewether was appointed Governor and Commander-in-Chief of Sierra Leone. One of his Private Secretaries was the colonial administrator Paul Shuffrey. In the 1916 New Year Honours, he was made a Knight Commander of the Order of Saint Michael and Saint George (KCMG). Merewether's term expired in early 1916 and was due to return to England on board the British and African Steamer, SS Appam, but was taken prisoner when the ship was captured by the Imperial German Navy raider SMS Möwe on 15 January 1916. He and his wife were released when the Appam arrived under control of its German prize crew in Norfolk, Virginia, in early February.

== Later life ==
Merewether was lastly appointed as Governor of the Leeward Islands, serving from 1916 to 1921. In September 1920, he entertained Edward, Prince of Wales at Government House, Antigua on the occasion of his visit to the West Indies.

He died in Kensington, London, on 28 December 1938.

== Honours ==
Knight Commander of the Order of St Michael and St George (KCMG)	NY 1916
Companion of the Order of St Michael and St George (CMG)	KB 1902
Knight Commander of the Royal Victorian Order (KCVO)	RV 1907
Commander of the Royal Victorian Order (CVO)	RV 1903
King George V Coronation Medal	1911

Government offices
Preceded by Sir Gerald Strickland as Chief Secretary	Lieutenant Governor and Chief Secretary of Malta; 1902–1911	Succeeded by John Clauson as Chief Secretary
Preceded by Sir Leslie Probyn	Governor of Sierra Leone; 1911–1916	Succeeded by Sir Richard James Wilkinson
Preceded by Sir Henry Hesketh Bell	Governor of the Leeward Islands; 1916–1921	Succeeded by Eustace Fiennes
