= Richard Doherty (British Army officer) =

Irish colonial administrator (1785–1862)

Lieutenant-general Sir Richard Doherty (né O'Dogherty; 1785 – 2 September 1862) was an Irish colonial administrator and a British Army officer who served as Governor of Sierra Leone (1837–1840, Lieutenant-governor of St Vincent (1842–1845) and commander-in-chief in Jamaica (1853–1855).

== Biography ==
Born Richard O'Dogherty in 1785 into an Irish Catholic family at Garculea House in Coolmoyne, near Golden, County Tipperary. He was the eldest of four sons born to Leonard O'Dogherty and his wife, Anne, daughter of Roger Scully of Cashel. He entered the army in 1803.

His brother, Theobald O'Dogherty, had a distinguished career with the Royal Marines, but he never received the promotions he deserved because of his Irish Catholic background. To advance his career, Richard elected to convert to Protestantism and change the spelling of his surname—from O'Dogherty to the more Anglo Doherty. He was rewarded with a promotions, followed by a knighthood in 1841.

He was Governor of Sierra Leone from 13 June 1837 to 16 December 1840. He was succeeded as governor in 1840 by Sir John Jeremie and knighted in 1841. He was Commander in Chief of Jamaica in 1853.

Doherty started his military career as an ensign in the 90th Regiment of Foot in 1803. From his regiment's base on St Vincent, he was part of the British invasions of Martinique (1809), where he was wounded, and Guadeloupe (1810), both campaigns during the Napoleonic Wars. During the War of 1812 he served in Canada and at Fort Niagara in the US.

He advanced through the ranks, serving as captain (1812), major (1824), lieutenant-colonel (1826), colonel (1841), major-general (1851) and lieutenant-general (1858). In addition to the 90th Foot he served with the 21st Foot, Royal African Rifle Corps, 1st and 3rd West India Regiments. He was colonel of the 11th (North Devonshire) Regiment from 1857 until his death in 1862 in Richmond, Surrey.

In 1845, he married widow Rachel Sophia Munro (née Ludford), who was the daughter of physician Jonathan Anderson Ludford of Jamaica. He died in 1862 in London at the age of 77.
