= Bai Bureh =

Sierra Leonean leader (1840 – 1908)

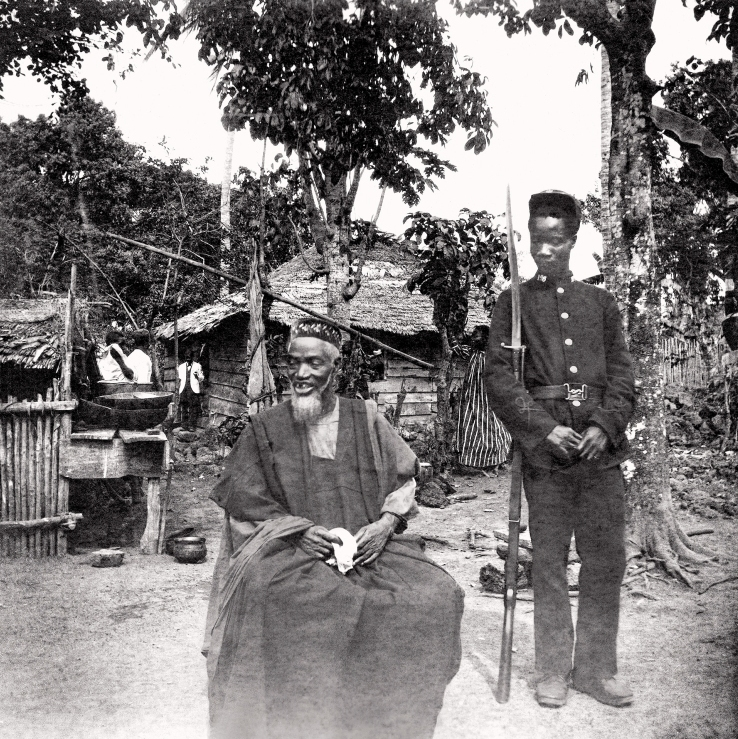
- Temne leader Bai Bureh seen here in 1898 after his surrender, sitting relaxed in his traditional dress with a handkerchief in his hands, while a Sierra Leonean West African Regiment soldier stands guard next to him.

Personal details
- Born: February 15, 1840 Kasseh, Sierra Leone, British West Africa
- Died: August 24, 1908 (aged 68) Kasseh, British Sierra Leone
- Occupation: Leader in the Hut Tax War of 1898 in Northern Sierra Leone against British rule and Krio dominance
- Profession: Warrior, tribal leader

Bai Bureh (February 15, 1840 – August 24, 1908) was a Sierra Leonean ruler, military strategist, and Muslim cleric, who led the Temne and Loko uprising against British rule in 1898 in Northern Sierra Leone.

== Early life and rule pre-rebellion ==
Bai Bureh was born in 1840 in Kasseh, a village near Port Loko in the North West Province of Sierra Leone. Bai Bureh's father was a Muslim cleric and an important Loko chief and his mother was a Temne trader from Makeni.

When Bureh was a young man his father sent him to the small village of Gbendembu in northern Sierra Leone, where he was trained to become a warrior. During his training at the village, he showed that he was a formidable warrior and was given the nickname of Kebalai, which translates as "one who doesn’t tire of war." When Kebalai returned to his home village, he was crowned ruler of Kasseh.

During the 1860s and 1870s, Bureh became the top warrior of Port Loko and the entire Northern Sierra Leone. He successfully fought and won wars against other villagers and tribal leaders who were against his plan to establish correct Islamic and indigenous practices throughout Northern Sierra Leone. In 1882, Bureh fought against the Susu people from French Guinea (now Guinea) who invaded Kambia, a town in northern Sierra Leone. Bai Bureh's fighters defeated the Susu, pushed them back into French Guinea and returned the land to the local Kambia people. After winning several major wars, his popularity spread. The people of the north felt they had found a warrior who would defend their land. In 1886, Bai Bureh was crowned as the chief of Northern Sierra Leone.

== Rebellion ==
As a ruler, Bureh never wanted to cooperate with the colonial government who were living in the capital city of Freetown. Bai Bureh refused to recognise a peace treaty the British had negotiated with the Limba without his participation; and on one occasion, his warrior fighters raided their way across the border into French Guinea.

On January 1, 1893, the colonial government instituted a hut tax in Sierra Leone and throughout British colonies in Africa. The tax could be paid in either money, grain, stock or labor. Many Sierra Leoneans had to work as laborers to pay the tax. The hut tax enabled the colonial government to build roads, towns, railways and other infrastructure amenities in Sierra Leone.

Bai Bureh opposed the British-imposed hut tax, arguing that his people should not be compelled to pay tribute to foreign rulers. He insisted that local chiefs should settle their own affairs without British control. After refusing to pay his taxes on several occasions, the colonial government issued a warrant to arrest Bureh. When the British Governor to Sierra Leone, Frederic Cardew, offered one hundred pounds as a reward for his capture, Bai Bureh reciprocated by offering the higher sum of five hundred pounds for the capture of the governor. In 1898, Bureh declared war on the British in Sierra Leone. The war later became known as the Hut Tax War of 1898.

Most of Bureh's fighters came from several Temne and Loko villages under his command, but other fighters came from Limba, Kissi and Kuranko villages, sent to his aid. Bai Bureh's men not only engaged in combat with the colonial government's forces but also killed dozens of Creoles who were living in Northern Sierra Leone because it was thought by the indigenous people of Sierra Leone that they supported the colonial government. One of the most notable Creole people who was killed by Bai Bureh's warriors was the trader John "Johnny" Taylor, who was killed in his house in Northern Sierra Leone.

Bai Bureh had the advantage over the forces of the colonial government for several months of the war. By 19 February 1898, Bai Bureh's forces had completely severed the lines of communication between Freetown and Port Loko. They blocked the road and the river from Freetown. Despite their arrest warrant, the colonial government's forces failed to defeat Bureh and his supporters. The conflict ultimately resulted in hundreds of casualties on both sides.

== Surrender and exile ==
Bai Bureh finally surrendered on 11 November 1898, when he was tracked down in swampy, thickly vegetated countryside by a small patrolling party of the newly organised West African Regiment in Port Loko. His Temne and Loko warriors fought for a while, but they did not evade the troops for long. Bai Bureh was taken under guard to Freetown, where crowds gathered around his quarters day and night to gain a glimpse of him. Bai Bureh was treated as a political prisoner and was given limited freedom.

The colonial government sent Bai Bureh into exile to the Gold Coast (now Ghana), along with the Sherbro chief Kpana Lewis and the Mende chief Nyagua. Both Kpana Lewis and Nyagua died in exile but Bai Bureh was brought back to Sierra Leone in 1905 and reinstated as the Chief of Kasseh. Bai Bureh died in 1908.

== Legacy ==
The significance of Bai Bureh's war against the British not in its outcome, but in the fact that a man lacking formal military training was able to resist the British for several months. The British troops were led by officers trained at the finest military academies, where war is studied in the same way that one studies a subject at university. The fact that Bai Bureh was not executed after his capture has led some historians to claim that this was due to admiration for his prowess as an adversary to the British.

The tactics employed by Bai Bureh in during the conflict were very much the forerunner of tactics employed by guerilla forces worldwide. At the time these tactics were revolutionary, and he "succeeded" for the good reason he had expert knowledge of the terrain across which the war took place. Bai Bureh had pursued the war not just with a sound military mind but also a sense of humour; when Governor Cardew offered the princely sum of 100 pounds as a reward for his capture, Bai Bureh reciprocated by offering the sum of 500 pounds for the capture of the Governor.

There is a very large statue of Bai Bureh in central Freetown.

His portrait appears on Sierra Leone's one-leone banknote issued in 2022.

A Sierra Leonean professional football club called the Bai Bureh Warriors from Port Loko is named after him.

Former Peace Corps volunteer Gary Schulze and his colleague William Hart discovered the only known photograph of Bai Bureh for sale on eBay in August 2012. The photo was put on display in the Sierra Leone National Museum in 2013.
