= Kasseh =

Kasseh Kasseh, Sierra Leone
- Location in Sierra Leone
- Coordinates: 8°46′0″N 12°47′15″W
- Country: Sierra Leone
- Province: North West Province
- District: Port Loko District

Population (2006)
  - Total: 3,386
- Time zone: UTC-5 (GMT)

Kasseh is a historic rural town in Bureh Kasseh Maconteh Chiefdom, Port Loko District located in the North West Province of Sierra Leone, with a population of 3,386 (2006 estimate).

The population of Kasseh is almost entirely inhabited by the Temne people. The Temne language is the language of communication in the town and is widely spoken throughout the town. The Krio language is not widely spoken in Kasseh.

The small town of Kasseh is widely known throughout Sierra Leone for being the birthplace of one of West Africa's greatest indigenous leader and Sierra Leone's greatest leader, Bai Bureh, who led the Temne people of Northern Sierra Leone in an uprising against British rule in 1898. The house where Bai Bureh resided is still present today in Kasseh. The town is visited by people from all parts of Sierra Leone to just to see the home town of Bai Bureh.

== Religion and education ==
The population of Kasseh is mainly Muslim at around 97% or even higher, as there are virtually no Christians in the town. The Muslim of Kasseh combine Islam with their traditional indigenous beliefs. Several Islamic schools as well as the Sierra Leone Government public primarily and secondary schools are also present in the town.
