= Circular Road Cemetery =

Cemetery in Freetown, Sierra Leone

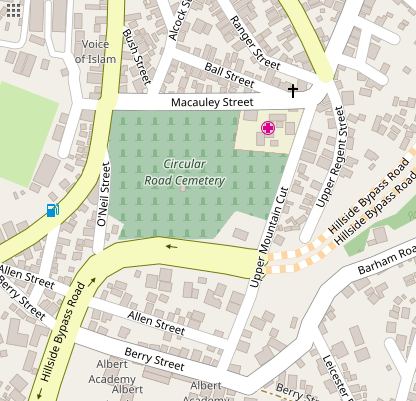
- Map of Circular Road Cemetery, April 2017

Details
- Established: 1827
- Location: Freetown
- Country: Sierra Leone
- Find a Grave: Circular Road Cemetery

Circular Road Cemetery is a cemetery located in Freetown, Sierra Leone. It was opened in 1827. Urban expansion had meant that the old burial ground at the south end of Howe Street had become surrounded by houses and so could not be enlarged. While the old cemetery was still used for the descendants of Nova Scotia and Maroon settlers, this was subsequently turned into a playground.

== History of neglect ==
The cemetery has a long history of neglect. Writing in 1958, Christopher Fyfe complained that the cemetery was little cared for, mentioning that John Bowen, the bishop of Sierra Leone in the late 1850s had described the place as “a wild, neglected cemetery”. Lee Karen Stow made similar complaints after visiting the cemetery in 2015. Freetown City Council is responsible for the cemetery's upkeep. However the Ministry of Lands, Country Planning and the Environment has been issuing documents which legitimise otherwise illegal occupation of parts of the cemetery. In this way the building of first temporary structures and then more permanent buildings has been encroaching on the land. The lack of any fencing has not helped the authorities to discourage this, or the dumping of waste there which is also prevalent. In October 2016 there were accounts of graves being opened and body parts removed. Although some fences had been erected, they were not sufficient to deter trespassing during the night after cemetery staff had gone home. Three people were arrested for this, two of whom were released for lack of evidence.

== Notable interments ==
- Neil Campbell 1827
- Octavius Temple 1834
- John Jeremie 1841
- John Bowen 1859
