= Neil Campbell (British Army officer) =

Major-General Sir Neil Campbell CB
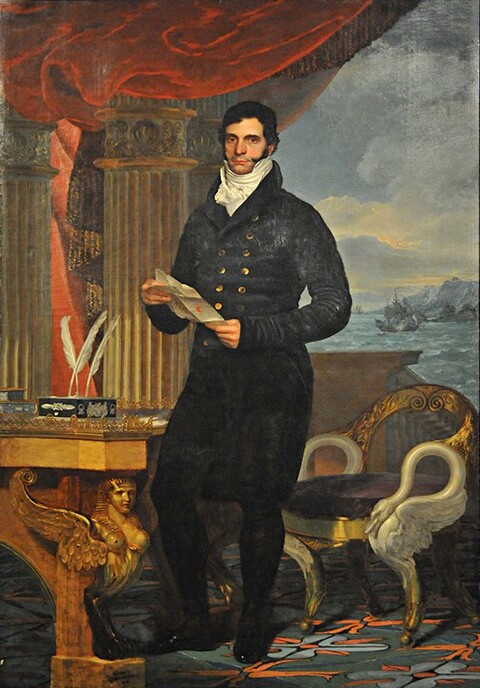
- Portrait by Casimir Carbonnier, 1818
- Born: 1 May 1778
- Died: 14 May 1827 (aged 49); Sierra Leone
- Military career
- Allegiance: United Kingdom
- Branch: British Army; Portuguese Army
- Service years: 1797–1827
- Rank: Major-General (Britain); Colonel (Portugal)
- Commands: Hanseatic Legion; Governor of Sierra Leone
- Conflicts: French Revolutionary Wars; Napoleonic Wars; Caribbean campaign; Invasion of Martinique; Invasion of Guadeloupe; Peninsular War; Siege of Almeida; Battle of Fuentes de Oñoro; Siege of Ciudad Rodrigo; Siege of Badajoz; Battle of Salamanca; Siege of Burgos; German campaign; Battle of Lützen; Battle of Bautzen; Siege of Danzig; Campaign in north-east France; Battle of Brienne; Battle of Fère-Champenoise (WIA); Hundred Days; Capture of Cambrai
- Awards: Army Gold Cross; Order of Saint Anna (Russia); Order of Saint Vladimir (Russia)

Major-General Sir Neil Campbell CB (1 May 1776 – 14 August 1827) was a British Army officer who fought during the Napoleonic Wars, administered several British colonies, and escorted Napoleon Bonaparte into exile.

== Biography ==
Born on 1 May 1776, Campbell was the son of a British Army officer.

== Early career ==
In 1797, Campbell purchased his first commission in the Army as an ensign with a regiment stationed in the Turks and Caicos Islands. In 1799, Campbell purchased a lieutenancy. In 1800, Campbell went to England and joined a regiment of light troops there. From February 1802 to September 1803, he attended the Royal Military College, then located at Great Marlow. After his time at the college, Campbell became an assistant quartermaster-general.

In 1805, Campbell purchased a promotion to major in a regiment that spent two years in Jamaica. After returning to England, Campbell purchased a promotion to lieutenant colonel. Over the next three years, Campbell participated in the campaigns to capture Martinique, the Îles des Saintes, and Guadeloupe from the French.

== War in Europe ==
Campbell returned to Britain in 1810 and in 1811 was seconded as a colonel in the Portuguese infantry, a post he held until 1813. In that year he was sent as a British military attaché to accompany the Russian Army. He was present with them at the Battle of Bautzen, where he was able to view Napoleon at a distance. Campbell was with the Russians when they invaded France in 1814, where he participated actively in fighting the French. He was severely wounded on 25 March 1814 while leading a cavalry charge during the Battle of Fère-Champenoise when a Russian Cossack mistook him for a French officer. Later in 1814, Campbell became a full colonel and in 1815 received a knighthood.

== Exile of Napoleon and Waterloo ==
After the abdication of Napoleon in April 1814, Campbell was tasked with escorting him into exile on the Island of Elba and then heading the military detachment there. Lord Castlereagh, Great Britain's foreign minister, had insisted that Napoleon be given complete freedom on the island. On 26 February 1815, while Campbell was in Italy, Napoleon escaped Elba. There were suspicions in England that Napoleon had bribed Campbell to allow his escape, but the foreign ministry did not fault Campbell in any way.

In 1815 Campbell served in the Waterloo Campaign and served as a commander of occupation forces in France until 1818.

== Sierra Leone ==
Campbell was promoted to major general in 1825 and was now able to apply for a staff appointment. The first opportunity was as governor of Sierra Leone. Due to the health hazards in that colony, Campbell's family asked him to turn down the assignment. However, Campbell decided to go.

On 14 August 1827, Campbell died in Sierra Leone and was buried in Circular Road Cemetery. In a 4 June 1833 letter to his nephew James Fitzjames, the Reverend Robert Coningham writes: "My poor friend Sir Neil Campbell who died at Sierra Leone, lost his life by imprudent exposure & exertion before he had recovered entirely from an attack of fever, by which means a relapse took place, when he was too weak to struggle against the malady."
