= William Fergusson (colonial administrator) =

British-Jamaican doctor (1795–1846)

William Fergusson (c. 1795–19 January 1846) was a British Jamaican medical doctor who served as Governor of Sierra Leone.

== Personal life ==
Fergusson was born in the Colony of Jamaica to a Scottish father and a Jamaican mother of African descent. Fergusson married Charlotte Hall, the daughter of a Scottish merchant in November 1818. Their grandson was the painter William Fergusson Brassey Hole. Fergusson died at sea, on his way to Scotland, in 1846.

== Medical career ==
Fergusson is the first known student of African descent to attend the University of Edinburgh. He became a licentiate of the Royal College of Surgeons of Edinburgh in 1813 and was commissioned as a Hospital Assistant in the British Army. He was posted to the Colony of Sierra Leone on the recommendation of the African Association and he was appointed Second Surgeon to the colony. In 1824, he rose to the rank of Assistant Surgeon in the Royal African Corps and was later promoted to Staff Surgeon, First Class. As a colonial surgeon, Fergusson had responsibilities in the Liberated African Department, treating Africans rescued from slavery by the Royal Navy.

== Political career ==
His work in Sierra Leone led to him being noticed by the colonial government and that resulted in his appointment as Lieutenant-Governor of the Colony of Sierra Leone in 1841 and again in 1844 before he was appointed as Governor of the Colony of Sierra Leone by Queen Victoria in 1845. He was the only colonial governor of a British African colony who was himself of African descent. Fergusson wanted to expand the colony and made treaties with neighbouring chiefs.
