= Leslie Probyn =

Administrator for the British Empire

Sir Leslie Probyn KCMG
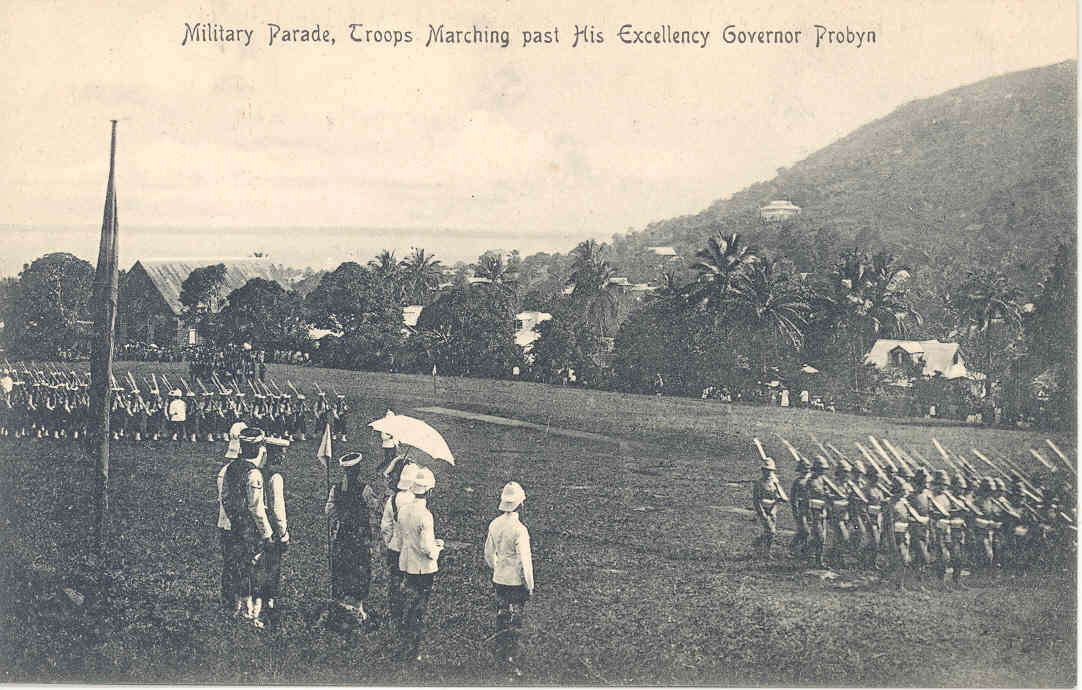
- Troops parade past Leslie Probyn during his governorship of Sierra Leone

Governor of Sierra Leone
- In office 3 October 1904 – 1910
- Monarch: Edward VII
- Preceded by: Charles King-Harman
- Succeeded by: Edward Mereweather

Governor of Barbados
- In office 13 February 1911 – 1918
- Monarch: George V
- Preceded by: Gilbert Carter
- Succeeded by: Charles O'Brien

Governor of Jamaica
- In office 11 June 1918 – 1924
- Monarch: George V
- Preceded by: Robert Johnstone
- Succeeded by: Herbert Bryan

Personal details
- Born: 23 February 1862
- Died: 17 December 1938 (aged 76) Folkestone, Kent, England
- Spouse: Emily Davies
- Children: 2

Sir Leslie Probyn KCMG (23 February 1862 – 17 December 1938) was an administrator for the British Empire.

== Career ==
Probyn was called to the bar at the Middle Temple in 1884.

He began his career as a British colonial administrator in the Caribbean. From 1893 to 1896, he served as Attorney-General of British Honduras. In 1896, he was appointed Attorney General of Grenada. He was then moved to west Africa, serving successively as Secretary and Acting High Commissioner of Southern Nigeria (1901-1904) and governor of Sierra Leone (1904-1910).

=== Sierra Leone ===
In Sierra Leone, he increased native suffrage and sought to make sure that laws were not enacted without active native participation in the process. During his six years as governor of Sierra Leone (1904 to 1910) he held referendums with the indigenous population to judge whether or not there was popular support for proposed policies. As a matter of policy in Sierra Leone, Probyn would not enforce rules unless he felt that Sierra Leone's native majority were in favor of them. As governor of Sierra Leone, Probyn took a stand against the practice of cannibalism, which he declared illegal. Groups of heavily militarized Kono warriors were raiding Mende villages. Probyn used the British army to end the raids, and then had Mende people from the area trained as soldiers. The raids were successfully stopped by this effort. Working as soldiers also provided prestige and good pay for the Mende-majority region. The Leopard Society, a murder cult that engaged in ritualistic human sacrifice and cannibalism, became an issue during Probyn's tenure as governor and he had to use his authority to simultaneously investigate and prosecute cases as they emerged, while also calming down rural populations who were gripped with fear; with regards to this effort Probyn said he was "preventing mass hysteria." Probyn had the distinction of leaving Sierra Leone measurably popular among the colony's African majority. When he was replaced by Edward Merewether, many Africans who worked for the British government in Sierra Leone petitioned that they "wanted Probyn back."

=== Caribbean ===
Probyn then returned to the Caribbean, where he was first Governor of Barbados (1911-1918) and then of Jamaica (1918-1924). During his tenure as governor of Jamaica, women were granted suffrage. However, Probyn mandated that this be subject to "safe and rigid qualifications", meaning that the majority of black Jamaican women were still effectively denied the right to vote.

On his retirement from the colonial service he returned to England, where he served as Chairman of the Royal Victoria Hospital, Folkestone.

== Personal life ==
Probyn was one of four children of Edmund Probyn, JP and DL, and Charlotte Seymour Jones. He was educated at Charterhouse School. He was made a KCMG in 1909. He married Emily Davies (d. 1926), with whom he had two daughters, Sybil Rose (b. 1888) and Dorothy Emily (1889-1963). Through his sister, Evelyn, he was uncle of the seventh earl of Lisburne.

Probyn was also the author of a number of treatises on legal practice, and was a regular contributor to the literary magazine The Nineteenth Century and After.

== Select bibliography ==
- Leslie Probyn, Statutory form of a bill of sale, with forms of, and rules for drawing same; also a digest of all the reported cases (London, 1888)
- Leslie Probyn, The jurisdiction and practice of the Mayor's court together with appendices of forms, rules and statutes specially relating to the court. (London, 1896)
