= William Hollingworth Quayle Jones =

Sir William Hollingworth Quayle Jones (6 February 1854 – 6 January 1925) was a British colonial judge and administrator. He was chief justice of Sierra Leone as well as acting governor of the colony. He was knighted in 1892.

He was born in Pakenham, Suffolk, the son of Rev. Charles William Jones, vicar of Pakenham, and Barbara Rose Weale. He was educated at Caius College, Cambridge. He died at a Barton Mere, Bury St Edmunds.
