= Francis Pinkett =

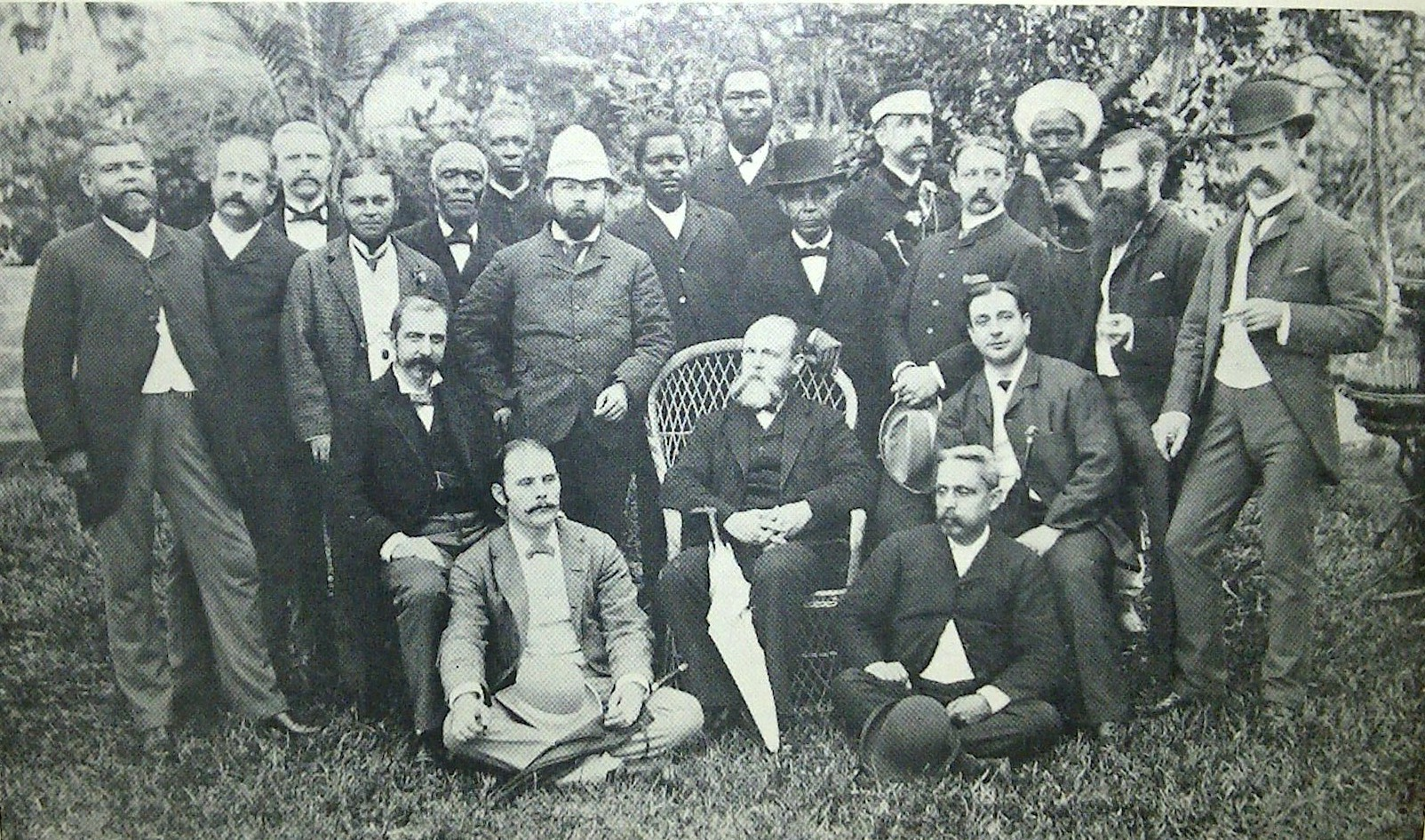
- Francis Pinkett (seated, centre) photographed in 1885

Personal details
- Born: 1838
- Died: 1887 (aged 48–49) Freetown, Sierra Leone
- Occupation: Judge

Francis Frederick Pinkett (1838-1887) was an English colonial administrator who served as Governor of Sierra Leone and Nigeria.

Francis was the younger son of Edward Pinkett of Trafalgar Square, Barnstaple. He was a lieutenant in the Royal Wiltshire Militia when he was admitted to Gray's Inn in 1861 and was called to the bar, Middle Temple in 1863.

He was the Chief Justice of the Colony of Sierra Leone from 1881 until his death.
