= Frederic Cardew =

British Army officer and Governor of Sierra Leone

Colonel Sir Frederic Cardew, KCMG (27 September 1839 – 6 July 1921) was a British Army officer and colonial governor. He was Governor of Sierra Leone from 1894 to 1900. The hut tax that he introduced led to the Hut Tax War of 1898.
