= James Shaw Hay =

British colonial governor (1839–1924)

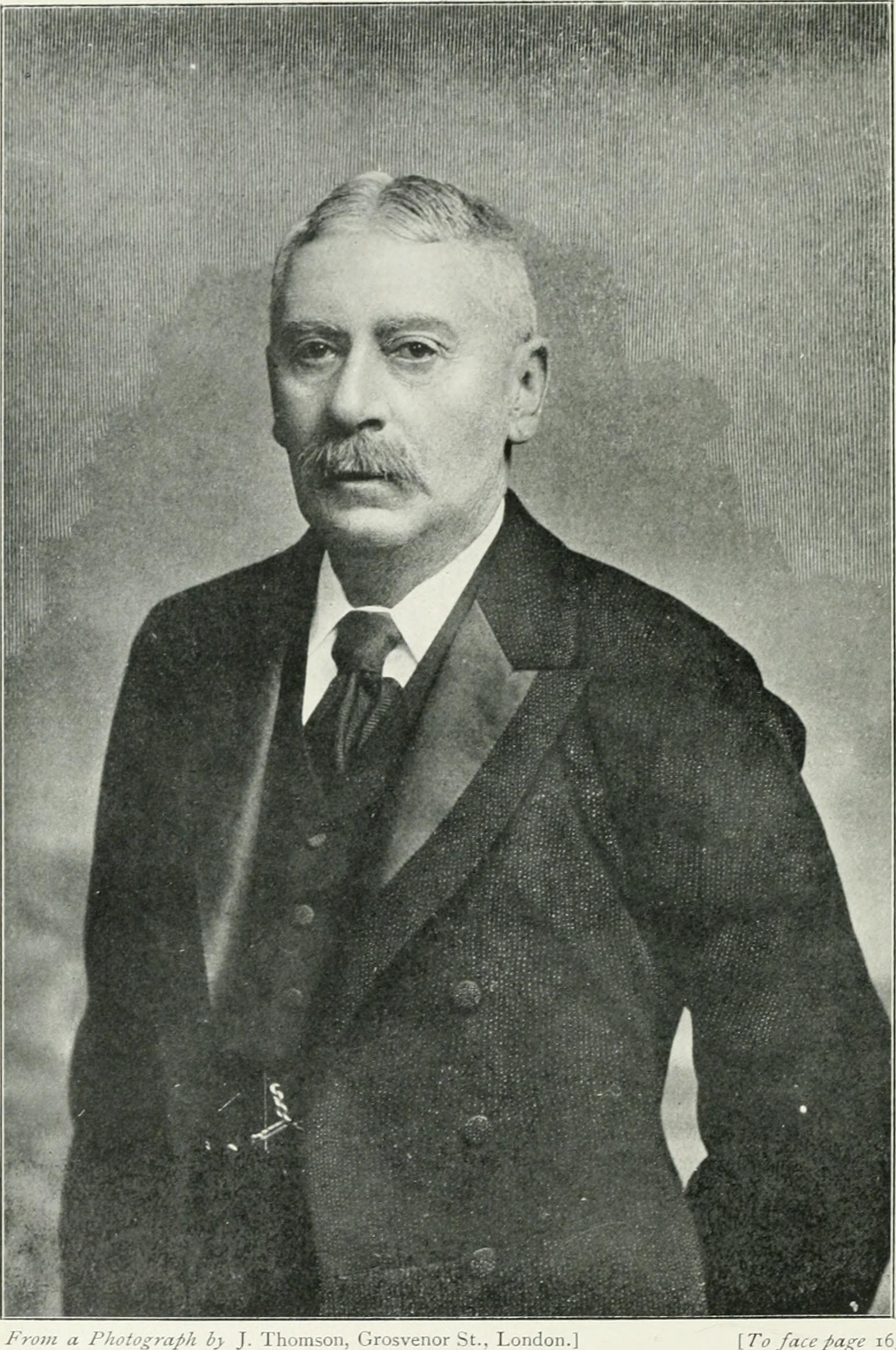

Sir James Shaw Hay KCMG (25 October 1839 – 20 June 1924) was a British colonial governor.

== Family ==
He was the second son of Lieutenant-Colonel Thomas Pasley Hay (1 May 1801 - 28 June 1858) and wife (married 24 February 1824) Georgette Heine Arnaud (c. 1808 - 10 December 1874).

== Biography ==
He fought in the Indian Mutiny in 1857 and became an Officer in 1858 in the service of the 89th Regiment.

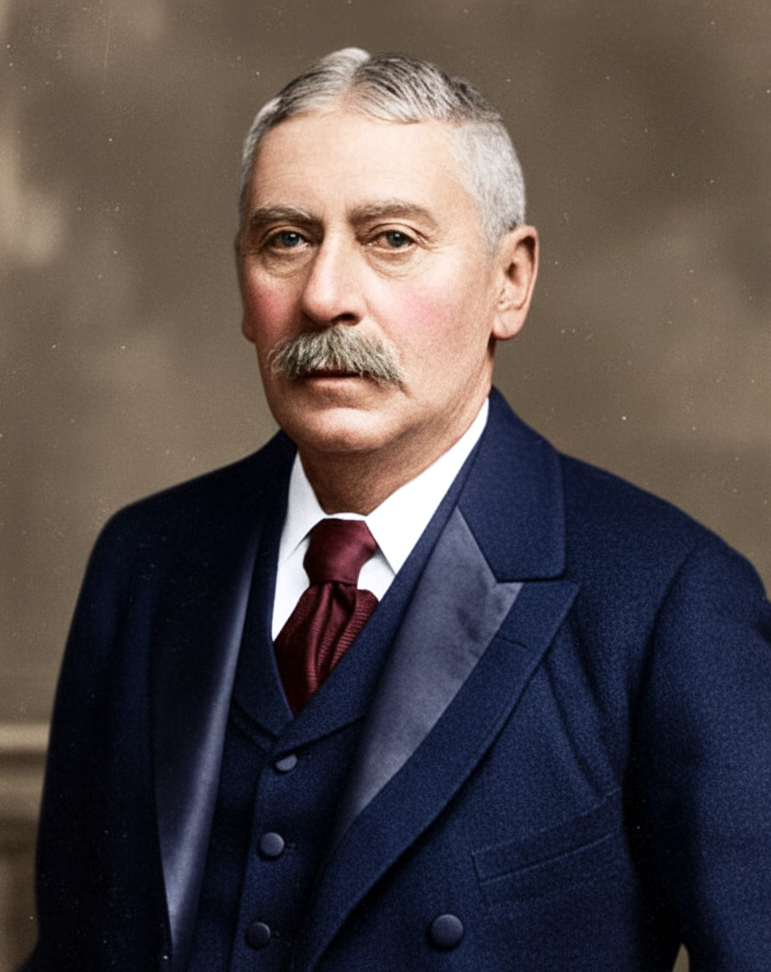
Governor of Barbados, 1891-1900

He was the 8th Administrator of the Gambia between 1886 and 1888, Acting Governor and Commander-in-Chief of Sierra Leone between 1886 and 1888 and again in 1888 until 24 November, when he became effective until 1889, as again between 1890 and 1891, and the 3rd Governor and Commander-in-Chief of Barbados between 1891 and 1900.

He was invested as a Knight Commander of the Order of St Michael and St George in 1889.

== Marriages and issue ==
He married firstly Jane Morin, daughter of John Morin of Allanton, Dumfriesshire, and had one daughter:

- Margaret Eleanor Hay (? - 7 March 1955), married on 5 December 1895 to Major of the W. R. Regiment Harold Wolstenholme Cobb (? - 15 October 1909), without issue

He married secondly Frances Marie Polatza (? - 17 June 1893), daughter of Jacques Polatza, from Brussels, without issue.

He married thirdly on 31 January 1894 Isabella Graham Cockburn (c. 1848 - Kensington, London, 5 January 1926), daughter of George Ferguson Cockburn and Sarah Charlotte Bishop, without issue.

== See also ==
- List of colonial governors of the Gambia
- List of colonial governors of Sierra Leone
- List of governors of Barbados

Police appointments
| Preceded by Captain A. W. Baker | Inspector General of Constabulary, Gold Coast ? - ? | Succeeded by Alexander Grant |
