= Cape Saint Ann =

Northwest extremity of Sherborough Island, Sierra Leone

Coordinates: 7°34′N 12°57′W

Cape Saint Ann is the northwest extremity of Sherborough Island, Sierra Leone.

From the tip of Saint Ann, the Shoals of Saint Ann extend out some 45 miles to the northwest, according to an 1852 nautical record.
