= John Jeremie =

British judge and diplomat

Sir John Jeremie
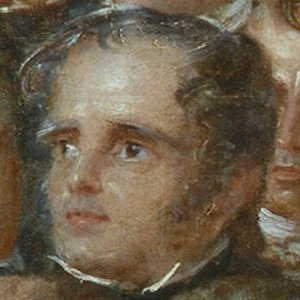
- Jeremie in 1840
- Born: 19 August 1795; Guernsey, Channel Islands
- Died: 23 April 1841 (aged 45); Port Loko, Sierra Leone
- Education: Dijon, France
- Occupations: Diplomat, judge, ruler
- Parent: John Jeremie

Sir John Jeremie (19 August 1795 – 23 April 1841) was a British judge and diplomat, Chief Justice of Saint Lucia and Governor of Sierra Leone. He was given an award in 1836 for advancing "negro freedom" after accusing the judges in Mauritius of bias. He understood that colour prejudice and slavery were different problems.

== Biography ==
Jeremie was born to John Jeremie, a barrister, on the British island of Guernsey in 1795. He went to Blundell's School in Devon before studying law in Dijon, France. His father died in Malta in 1810. He was called to the bar in his home island where he was successful, and published a posthumous legal work of his father's.

== St Lucia ==
Jeremie was appointed in 1824 to be Chief Justice of Saint Lucia, a post he held until 1831. During this time he was called upon to administer the slave laws that applied in the British Empire at that time. Although the slave trade had been abolished in the British Empire, slavery per se continued to be legal in some form during this time. The issue of slavery continued to be a subject that Jeremie was associated with throughout his life. He wrote four essays on Colonial Slavery pointing out the problems of slave communities and the improvements made in their conditions in Saint Lucia. He also advised on how to end slavery altogether. These publications were brought to the British public's attention and are thought to have contributed to slavery's abolition.

== Mauritius ==
Jeremie was appointed the procureur and advocate general of the island of Mauritius in 1832, but this was a very difficult appointment. In 1830, the Governor Sir Charles Colville reported that there was a great deal of bad feeling against His Majesty's Government continues to prevail and shew itself here… there is an almost total cessation in the payment of taxes... He arrived there in June 1832, and the hostility to him as a known abolitionist was very difficult to handle. It took an armed escort to get him off his boat after trying to leave for two days. The judges refused to turn up to appoint him, and he was attacked by a mob in the street. Sir Charles Colville ordered him home, but he was sent out again when he arrived back in Great Britain. He arrived again the following year but there were continued charges about his and others' behaviour. In 1833 he charged the judges with bias and involvement with slavery. The governor failed to support him, and he resigned again and left on 28 October 1833. His behaviour was justified in his 1835 report – "Recent Events at Mauritius".

"Within the last three years he has traversed fifty thousand miles encountered the assassin on shore and the pirate at sea for ten years has it been his fate to face in the service of the crown every peril to which life is subject whether from the ocean from climate or the hand of man.

Jeremie could see that slavery would be illegal soon, and he predicted that other existing laws predicated on colour prejudice would be a source of further ill feeling. He petitioned to have the respective laws revoked.

Ten years ago a legal distinction broad and galling existed between the free classes throughout our negro colonies – the distinction of colour It was said to be interwoven with the whole frame work of society and inexpugnable ...

== Ceylon ==
On 2 October 1835 he was appointed second puisne judge of the Ceylon Supreme Court, and took up the position on 9 December 1836. In the same year he was honoured by the Anti-Slavery Society with a plaque that read:

The Honourable John Jeremie

one of his Majesty's Justices of the Supreme Court of the island of Ceylon etc etc By whose inflexible adherence to right principle under circumstances of unparalleled difficulty while discharging high official duties in the colonies of either hemisphere and by whose disinterested able and energetic exertions in most critical and painful situations both at home and abroad Negro Freedom has been largely advanced and the negro character raised to its just standard in public estimation. This tribute of affectionate respect

is given by his coadjutors in the anti slavery cause 2 July 1836.

Jeremie is just to the right of centre in this painting which is of the 1840 Anti-Slavery Convention. Move your cursor to identify him or click icon to enlarge

Jeremie was in London to attend the World's anti-slavery convention on 12 June 1840. With some premonition, Jeremie was to write later of his time in Ceylon, when others were worried that he had accepted a position as a Governor in Sierra Leone:

"Governors indeed die in Sierra Leone, but it was my fate to serve six years in one of our West Indian governments wherein four governors to my knowledge died in about as many years General Stewart, General Mackie, Colonel Maret, and General Farquharson. It was also my fate as the government passes to the senior officer in garrison of whatever rank to swear in two captains, a major, and a colonel, as governors within a month. The last of whom was in due course superseded by my friend General Mackie from England, who died within eight weeks... I am now the only survivor of the three judges who belonged to the supreme court of Ceylon when I ascended that bench on the 9 December 1836.

== London ==
The portrait above shows him in a detail from this painting made to commemorate the event which attracted delegates from America, France, Haiti, Australia, Ireland, Jamaica and Barbados.

== Sierra Leone ==
He was appointed Governor of Sierra Leone on 15 October 1840 which was both an honour and a health risk. His confidence is apparent in the quotation above where he notes that he survived six years in Ceylon and outlived the other judges appointed to the Supreme Court there. His only daughter Catherine married Captain Taylor in March 1841. He was knighted on 15 November 1840, before leaving for Africa. He died at Port Loko in Sierra Leone of a fever after only a few months in Africa. He is buried in Circular Road Cemetery.

== Works ==
- He edited his father's legal work (in French)
- "Negro Emancipation and African Civilization" Open letter to, June 1840
