= China Keitetsi =

Ugandan activist (born 1976)

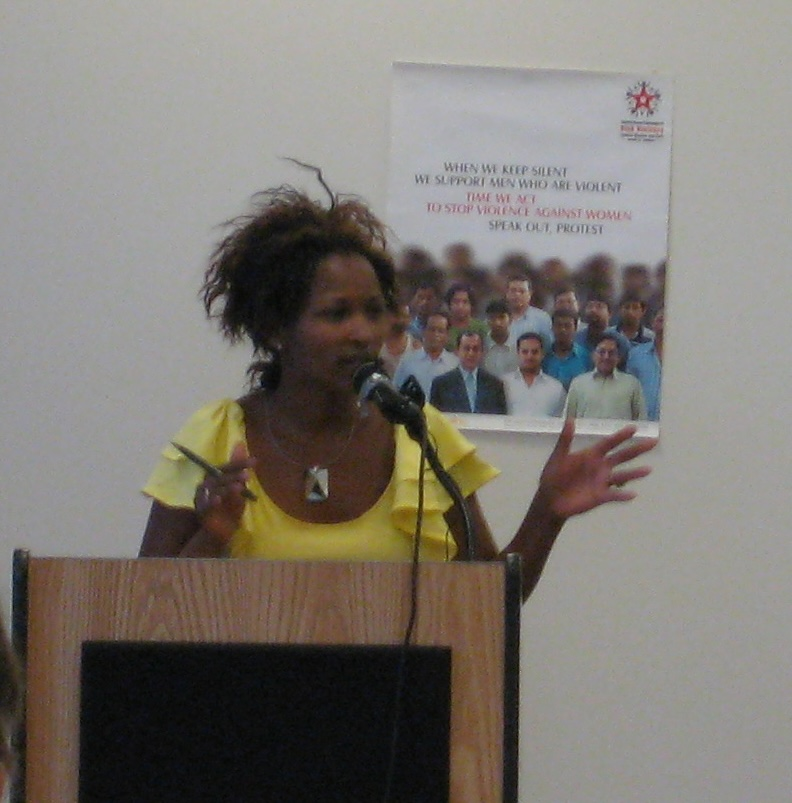
- China Keitetsi at the UNESCO Chair Intergenerational Leadership Forum, UConn, 2008.
- Born: 1976 (age 49–50); Uganda
- Citizenship: Denmark
- Writing career
- Notable works: Child Soldier: Fighting for my life (2002); Tears Between Heaven and Earth: My way back to life (2007)

China Keitetsi (born 1976) is a Ugandan activist campaigning against the use of child soldiers. The memoirs of Keitetsi, a former child soldier herself, have been translated into French, German, Japanese, Chinese, Danish, Italian, Spanish, Dutch and other languages.

== Biography ==
China Keitetsi was born in 1976 in the west of Uganda where she grew up in a rural area. Following her parents' separation, she ran away at age nine in 1984 along with her sister in an attempt to find their mother, but was unable to locate her. Amidst Uganda's civil war and with limited options, she was recruited into the rebel National Resistance Army, becoming a child soldier. In her speeches and books, Keitetsi explains how children were viewed as "perfect" soldiers due to their loyalty, speed in learning, and lack of questioning, and recounts the psychological trauma of replacing family with a gun—her only source of "protection"—along with the pressure to suppress emotions like grief or fear in order to survive.

China’s early years in Uganda and as a female child soldier showed the sexual assault that girls and women face in times of war and conflict.

Kampala fell on 26 January 1986, and Museveni was proclaimed as president, but Uganda remained haunted by civil war. During this period, China Keitetsi worked as a bodyguard for a high-ranking official before joining the Military Police. Several armed groups fought against the new government.

== Life as a female child soldier ==
China, like many other children recruited by the NRA to fight in the battle against the Obote government, remained in the ranks of the new government's army, the Ugandan People's Defence Forces (UPDF). She spent ten years as a female child soldier in fear, humiliation, and sexual assault under the Ugandan National Resistance Army.

== Life as free woman ==
Between 1986 and 1995 she made some short returns to civilian life but spent most of her time in the new governmental army.

She now lives in Denmark and has published her memoirs in a book entitled Child Soldier: Fighting for my life. She has become an international spokeswoman for the plight of child soldiers worldwide. China goes around Europe, the United States, Canada, and Japan, as well as to the UN, UNESCO, and the German Parliament giving lectures on the problems of children as soldiers. Many organizations, including UNICEF, Amnesty International, Terre des Hommes, Oxfam, the Coalition to Stop the Use of Child Soldiers, and IANSA, support China Keitetsi in her cause. China's book has been published in Denmark, The Netherlands, Germany, Austria, Switzerland, South Africa, England, France, Spain, the Czech Republic, Japan and China.

She recorded an intro to the song "Blood" of The Kelly Family (sung by Jimmy Kelly on the 2003 album Homerun).

== Her books ==
- Child Soldier: Fighting for my Life (German edition: Sie nahmen mir die Mutter und gaben mir ein Gewehr) published in 2002
- Tears Between Heaven and Earth: My way back to life 2007

== See also ==
- Children of War (2009) documentary by Bryan Single
- P. W. Singer investigator and author of Children at War (2005)
- Ishmael Beah, Sierra Leonean former child soldier
