= GBAP =

Gbap is a town in Sierra Leone.

GBAP may refer to:

- Gelatinase biosynthesis-activating pheromone, a bacterial peptide
- Glucosidase, beta; acid, pseudogene, a human (pseudo)gene
