= They Fight Like Soldiers, They Die Like Children =

Non-fiction book by Romeo Dallaire

- Author: Roméo Dallaire
- Language: English
- Publisher: Random House: Hutchinson, Cornerstone. Bloomsbury Publishing: Walker & Company
- Pages: 320
- ISBN: 978-0-09-179632-7

They Fight Like Soldiers, They Die Like Children is a non-fiction book by the Canadian politician and former general Romeo Dallaire (and Jessica Dee Humphreys) about the child-soldier phenomenon. The book contains a foreword by Ishmael Beah, an ex child soldier and author of A Long Way Gone: Memoirs of a Boy Soldier.

It was a finalist for the Mavis Gallant Prize for Non-Fiction from the Quebec Writers' Federation Awards in 2011.

The book was adapted into the television documentary film Fight Like Soldiers, Die Like Children by Patrick Reed in 2012.
