= A Long Way Gone =

2007 memoir by Ishmael Beah

A Long Way Gone: Memoirs of a Boy Soldier
- First edition cover
- Author: Ishmael Beah
- Cover artist: Jennifer Carrow, Michael Kamber, Philip Smith (photograph)
- Language: English
- Subject: History, Sierra Leone Civil War
- Genre: Memoir
- Publisher: Sarah Crichton Books
- Publication date: February 13, 2007
- Publication place: United States
- Media type: Print (hard and paperback); Audio CD
- Pages: 240 pp (first edition)
- ISBN: 978-0-374-10523-5
- OCLC: 69423270
- Dewey Decimal: 966.404 B 22
- LC Class: DT516.828.B43 A3 2007

A Long Way Gone: Memoirs of a Boy Soldier is a 2007 memoir written by Ishmael Beah, an author from Sierra Leone. The book is a firsthand account of Beah's time as a child soldier during the Sierra Leone Civil War in the 1990s. The book describes the change from Beah being an innocent child to being corrupted by war and its effects.

== Overview ==
Beah was 12 years old when he fled his village after it was attacked by "rebels", members of the Revolutionary United Front (RUF). He wandered the war-filled country until he was abducted into an army unit of the Sierra Leone Armed Forces that exposed the children they captured to violence, grooming them for battle, forcing them to manipulate guns and use drugs to ease what had now become their reality. Three years later, UNICEF released him, alongside other children in the armed group. From his release from the armed group, he then underwent a rehabilitation program that supported him in finding his uncle, who would eventually adopt him. But when war reached the capital city, Ishmael's uncle battled with health issues that exacerbated with hospitals being shut down. His uncle eventually passed away and Ishmael took off from war-torn-Sierra Leone of the time, in search for a better life.

== Main character list ==
Ishmael Beah: At the beginning of the book, Ishmael is a young boy whose parents are separated. He loves performing rap with his elder brother and friends. After armed forces attack his home village, he, his brother, and friends are left orphans and wander around seeking shelter. Ishmael is eventually abducted as a child soldier for the Sierra Leone Armed Forces at age 13. After being released from the armed group by UNICEF at 16, he is rehabilitated and begins to live with his Uncle Tommy. While there, he is recruited to travel to the United States to speak at a United Nations event about child soldiers. Returning to Freetown after his speaking event, he eventually made his way back to the United States. After a time, he was able to forgive himself and love once again.

Junior Beah: Ishmael's older brother by one year. He is eventually separated from Ishmael during the attack on the village of Kamator, which was the town they were taking refuge in.

Alhaji: One of Ishmael's closest friends. Alhaji was part of the group of boys from Mattru Jong that Ishmael met in the wilderness. Alhaji and Ishmael formed a close bond during their years as soldiers and were part of the same squad. Alhaji was nicknamed "Little Rambo" for his combat skills that were heavily influenced by the film. Alhaji and Ishmael were eventually taken by UNICEF and put into a rehabilitation shelter in Freetown. He apparently moved from foster home to foster home following the events of the book.

Kanei, Musa, Saidu, Jumah, Alhaji, and Moriba: Ishmael's friends from his home village whom he meets in the wilderness after being separated from his initial group. Saidu is the first of the group to die; he dies suddenly two nights after he and the other boys eat a crow that fell from the sky. Kanei is the oldest of the group by three years, although Alhaji is confused as being older because he is taller. He becomes a junior sergeant and later is chosen to stay behind because he is older while Alhaji and Ishmael are sent to rehabilitation. It is unknown what happens to him. Musa is the group's storyteller. He is killed in the first battle that Ishmael and his squad fight in. Jumah and Moriba also become part of the army. Jumah is assigned to another squad in a different village and is last seen preparing for another village raid. Moriba is killed in a fight sometime during Ishmael's time as a soldier.

Talloi, Gibrilla, Kaloko, and Khalilou: Ishmael's initial traveling companions. Talloi is Junior's friend and follows them to Mattru Jong for the contest. The three meet up with old friends, Gibrilla, Kaloko, and Khalilou there. They escape the attack of Mattru Jong by RUF forces, but are later split apart by another attack in a different village. Ishmael found Kaloko hiding as well, but Beah subsequently left him once he grew tired of hiding, and Kaloko was unwilling to follow him. It is unknown what happened to the four boys.

Uncle Tommy: Ishmael's Uncle. Uncle Tommy is a carpenter with three kids and a wife, all of whom welcome Ishmael as their new brother. They all love Ishmael irrevocably and unconditionally. Uncle Tommy and his wife are the only ones who know about Ishmael's past. However, they forgive him and take him in as their own son right away. Ishmael truly feels like he belongs when he is with them. Uncle Tommy later dies of sickness.

Esther: A nurse at the shelter whom Ishmael develops a friendship with. Ishmael tells parts of his war stories and dreams to Esther and soon comes to fully trust her. Esther gives Ishmael a Walkman with a Run–D.M.C. cassette and later buys him a Bob Marley cassette. Esther does regular check-ups on Ishmael's mental health during his period of rehabilitation at Benin Home. Ishmael admits that he loves her, but never sees her again after he leaves Freetown.

Mambu: Another child soldier with the Sierra Leone Armed Forces. Mambu and Ishmael meet at the shelter for the first time. They become close friends. He later goes back to the front lines after his family rejects him.

Mohamed: Ishmael's best friend from his home village, whom Ishmael is reunited with at the UNICEF rehabilitation center where Ishmael has already been for several months. Mohamed was meant to go with Ishmael to the talent show in the beginning of the story but had to stay behind to help his father work.

== Plot summary ==
=== Before the RUF attack ===
The book starts with Ishmael Beah, his older brother Junior, and their friend Talloi traveling from their village of Mogbwemo to Mattru Jong in order to perform in a talent show. Ishmael, Junior, and their friend dance and sing rap music. Thinking they would return the following day, they tell no one of their leaving.

=== RUF attacks and flight ===
During their stay in Mattru Jong with Gibrilla, Khalilou, and Kaloko, the RUF attacks. The three are able to flee the village without the rebels following them. They decide to head back home. On the way, it turns out that their village was also captured by the RUF. According to an old man who was sitting outside the village, most of the people had fled to a village on the Sierra Leone coast.

Ishmael, Junior, and their friend decide to travel there in order to locate their families. On their way, they encounter multiple other villages. They are accepted into another village on the grounds that they help with the farming. After months, the village is attacked. Caught by surprise, Ishmael, Junior, and their friend split up and run into the swamps.

It is unknown what happens to his friends afterwards. Ishmael roams around the wilderness by himself for a while, until he meets up with another group of traveling boys whom he recognizes from his home village. The boys then travel together to another village on the coast. Many refugees fled to this village because the Sierra Leone Armed Forces occupied it. In search of safety, the group of boys and Ishmael go to that village, but soon leave.

Ishmael then learns from a woman from his hometown that Junior, his younger brother Ibrahim, and his parents are safe in another village with many others from Mattru Jong. Just before they reach the village, the boys meet a man named Gasemu whom Ishmael knew from Mattru Jong. Gasemu tells them that Ishmael's family are indeed safe in the village and asks the boys to help him carry bananas back to that village. However, moments before they reach the town, it is attacked by the RUF.

Although their bodies are not found among the dead or in the burning house where they lived, Ishmael assumes that his family is dead. Devastated, and believing that Gasemu is to blame for not being able to see his family on time, Ishmael attacks Gasemu but is stopped by the other boys. They are then chased into the forest by remaining RUF soldiers, and Gasemu dies from being shot, leaving Ishmael more saddened.

=== Recruitment and life as a child soldier ===
The boys then settle into another village protected by the army. After many uneventful days, the lieutenant in charge of the troops in the village announced that the RUF was beginning to assault the village. The lieutenant said that in order for the people to survive, they must contribute to the war effort by enlisting in the army; escape was not an option. By doing this, the lieutenant secures many child soldiers, the weapon of choice for both the RUF and the Sierra Leone Armed Forces.

Ishmael becomes a junior lieutenant for his skill in executing prisoners of war and is put in charge of a small group of other child soldiers. As a child soldier, Ishmael is exposed to extreme violence and drug usage. The drugs he used are described in the book as "brown brown", "white pills", cocaine, and marijuana.

=== Rescue and rehabilitation ===
In January 1996, during one of the roll calls, a group of men wearing UNICEF shirts round up several boys and takes them to a shelter in Sierra Leone's capital, Freetown, where they and several other child soldiers are to be rehabilitated. However, the children cause much trouble for the volunteer staffers at the facility, with Ishmael experiencing symptoms of drug withdrawal as well as troubling memories of his time as a child soldier.

Despite the violence caused by the children, one of the staffers, Nurse Esther, becomes interested in Ishmael, learning about his childhood love of rap music and purchasing him a rap cassette and Walkman, when she takes Ishmael and his friend Alhaji to the city. It is through this connection and his numerous counseling experiences with Esther that Ishmael eventually turns away from his violent self and starts to heal from his mental wounds.

=== Adoption ===
Eventually, Ishmael becomes adopted by his Uncle Tommy in the city and settles down with him and his family on the outskirts of Freetown. It is during this time that Ishmael is chosen to speak to the United Nations (UN) in New York City about his experiences as a child soldier and the other problems plaguing his country.

While at the UN meeting, Ishmael met several other children who were also experiencing problems in their countries. There were 57 children present at the meeting, and each told his or her story to the UN. Ishmael also meets Laura Simms, his chaperone, who is a storyteller and his future foster mother.

=== Return to Sierra Leone and flight abroad ===
In 1997, after Ishmael has returned to Sierra Leone, Freetown is invaded by a combination of the RUF and the Armed Forces Revolutionary Council (AFRC), causing many civilian deaths, including the death of Uncle Tommy from malady. Believing that he can no longer stay in Freetown for fear of either becoming a soldier again or of being killed by his former army friends if he refuses, Ishmael decides to get in contact with Laura Simms. He then escapes Sierra Leone and crosses the border into Guinea, where he eventually makes his way to the United States and his new life abroad.

== Reception ==
The book continued to receive acclaim among many critics lists after and during its time of release. A Long Way Gone was nominated for a Quill Award in the Best Debut Author category for 2007. Time magazine's Lev Grossman named it one of the top 10 nonfiction books of 2007, ranking it at number three, and praising it as "painfully sharp", and its ability to take "readers behind the dead eyes of the child-soldier in a way no other writer has." A Long Way Gone was listed as one of the top ten books for young adults by the American Library Association in 2008.

== Accuracy dispute ==
In 2009, The Australian reported that aspects of Beah's account of his life story did not match other evidence. The report claimed that Beah's village was destroyed in 1995 rather than 1993, and that given the more compressed time frame, he could not have been a soldier for more than a couple of months, rather than the years that he describes in his book. He would also have been aged 15 when he became a soldier, rather than 13. Questions were also raised about Beah's description of a battle between child soldiers at a UNICEF camp, in which six people were said to have been killed. Witnesses interviewed by The Australian said that such an event in a UNICEF camp would have drawn significant attention in Sierra Leone, but no independent verification of such a battle could be obtained. Investigations by other publications also failed to discover other evidence of such a battle, and UNICEF, while supportive of Beah in general, also said that it had not been able to verify this aspect of his story.

The Australian's claims were subsequently denied in a statement issued by Beah, in which he called into question the reliability of the sources quoted. The statement also cited the fact that during the early stages of its research, the newspaper had investigated the possibility that Beah's father was still alive, a possibility that was based on mistaken identity by an Australian mining engineer. The Australian's published articles stated that they had established that the man in question was not Beah's father.

Beah's adoptive mother also reaffirmed her belief in the validity of the dates, quoting two Sierra Leonean sources who corroborated the chronology of events given in his book. However, the publisher amended this statement after The Australian objected that it seriously misrepresented the newspaper's report. The source cited by the publisher, Leslie Mboka, national chairman of the Campaign for Just Mining, was in fact quoted by The Australian. The newspaper quoted him as saying that Beah "was a young child who had been through terrible things so he could easily have got things mixed up." Mboka, when subsequently contacted by the publisher, reported to them that he had vigorously supported Beah's chronology when interviewed by The Australian, and had challenged the paper for bias. However, Mboka had not met Beah until after the disputed events had taken place, and so was unable to provide firsthand verification of his account. The other correction involved the newspaper's publication, not of Beah's foster-mother's address but of her publicly listed website address; hate mail had indeed been received, but via the Internet. While the publisher made note of these, it stood by the accuracy of the book.

The dispute over Beah's credibility arose at a time when the exposure of some "fictional" memoirs, such as Margaret Seltzer's account of growing up in a Los Angeles crime gang and James Frey's account of drug addiction, had led to debate over the nature of the genre. The controversy was followed up in international publications including the British Sunday Times, Slate, and the Village Voice.

Beah has claimed to have a "photographic memory", which enabled him to have perfect recall of the events he described, leaving him "less room to maneuver" than if he had allowed room for human error. However, some of his defenders as well as his critics allowed for the possibility that his account was not entirely accurate, stating that the main point was that he had drawn attention to an issue that was of vital importance. Possible explanations for any inaccuracies include the trauma of war as experienced by a young child, the drug use described in his account.

Neil Boothby, an academic who has undertaken extensive research into children and war, said that while all of the atrocities described by Beah have occurred at various points, it would be highly unusual for one child to have experienced them all. Boothby criticized the mentality that provided attention only to those with the most horrific stories to tell, thus encouraging exaggeration. "I've seen it over and over. Whether by psychologists or journalists, they are encouraged to tell the sensational stories... The system is set up to reward sensational stories. We all need to look at why does something have to be so horrific before we open our eyes and ears and hearts?"

== See also ==
- Children of War (2010), documentary by Bryan Single
- P. W. Singer, investigator and author of Children at War
