= Children of War =

Children of War may refer to:

- Children of War (2009 film), an American film based on the war in northern Uganda
- Children of War (2014 film), an Indian film based on the Bangladesh Liberation War
- the military use of children
