= Corporate Warriors =

Corporate Warriors may refer to:

- Corporate Warriors: The Rise of the Privatized Military Industry, a book by P. W. Singer
- "Corporate Warriors" (CSI: NY), an episode of CSI: NY
