= Tihun =

- Location in Sierra Leone
- Coordinates: 7.56°N 12.09°W
- Country: Sierra Leone
- Province: Southern Province
- District: Bonthe District
- Chiefdom: Sogbini Chiefdom

Population
  - Total: 5,556
- Time zone: UTC-5 (GMT)

Tihun is a small rural town in Sogbini Chiefdom, Bonthe District in the Southern Province of Sierra Leone. Tihun is the chieftaincy seat of Sogbini Chiefdom and is about ten miles to the main commercial town of Mattru Jong. The major economic activity in Tihun is farming. Tihun is the native home of the Sherbro people who are the vast majority in the town. In 2003 the population was estimated to be 5,556.

Tihun is the birthplace of Sierra Leone's president Julius Maada Bio. Maada Bio's father Charlie Bio II served as Paramount Chief of Sogbini Chiefdom, where Tihun is located, for many years.

In the 2018 Sierra Leone Presidential election, President Bio won over 95% of the votes overall in his home district of Bonthe, where Tihun is located.
