= Beah =

Beah is both a given name and a surname. Notable people with the name include:

- Beah Richards (1920–2000), American actress
- Ishmael Beah (born 1980), Sierra Leonean author
