= Brown-brown =

Form of powdered cocaine or heroin

Brown-brown, or brown cocaine, is a purported form of cocaine or amphetamine insufflation mixed with smokeless gunpowder.

Reports indicate that the composition of brown-brown varied, sometimes including cocaine, heroin, or other stimulants, often adulterated or of low purity. In some cases, smokeless gunpowder was added, which appears to have served a symbolic or psychological purpose rather than having a pharmacological effect.

The term may also refer to heroin.

Brown-brown is reportedly given to child soldiers before West African armed conflicts. One former child soldier, Michel Chikwanine, has written a graphic novel with Jessica Dee Humphreys called Child Soldier, about the experience of being captured at the age of 5 by rebel fighters in the Democratic Republic of Congo, including being given brown-brown. "The rebel soldier who had hit me used a long, jagged knife to cut my wrist and rubbed powder into the wound. They called it Brown Brown – a mixture of gunpowder and a drug called cocaine. Right away, I began to feel like my brain was trying to jump out of my head."

== In media and culture ==
=== Films ===
- The fictional character Yuri Orlov (portrayed by Nicolas Cage) uses the drug in Liberia in the film Lord of War (2005).
- It is also portrayed being used by Liberian child soldiers during their preparations for a combat/assault mission in the French/Liberian film Johnny Mad Dog (2008).
- Several characters in the film Beasts of No Nation (2015) are seen snorting a substance, possibly cocaine, possibly heroin, that is mixed with gunpowder and burned.
- It is referenced in The White Chamber (2018) as a drug used to enhance war efforts.

=== Literature ===
- In the novel Beasts of No Nation (2005) and its 2015 film adaptation, brown-brown is used by many of the child soldiers and the Commandant.
- Ishmael Beah describes using brown-brown, cocaine, and other drugs while he was a child soldier in Sierra Leone, in his memoir A Long Way Gone: Memoirs of a Boy Soldier (2007).
- In the mystery novel The Madness of Crowds (2021), 17th book of the Chief Inspector Armand Gamache series, one of the characters, Haniya Daoud, from Sudan, describes how brown-brown was used on child soldiers.

=== Television ===
- In 1000 Ways to Die episode 4.5, titled "Killing Them Softly" (2011), Tomo, a Sierra Leonean warlord, dies after snorting brown-brown with diamond dust in it, which cut through the lining of his lungs, breaching arteries and blood vessels.
- In the Funimation dub for the anime series Crayon Shin-Chan, the character Musae Koyama (aunt of the titular character, Shin Nohara) is renamed Bitzi Nohara and is presented as a photographer who is recovering from a brown-brown addiction after traveling to Africa and becoming romantically involved with a gun runner who trained child soldiers.
- Appears in The Great TV series.

=== Video games ===
- In the video game Metal Gear Solid 2: Sons of Liberty (2001), Raiden divulges his experience as a child soldier and references the implied use of their universe's brown-brown.

== Controversy ==
According to Brendan I. Koerner, the use of cocaine mixed with gunpowder may be less prevalent than reports indicate, as cocaine would be difficult to source during armed conflicts, especially in the African continent. Brown pills that were referred to as cocaine were most likely amphetamine. The first actual documentation of the term "brown-brown" was a 2005 Norwegian NGO report that stated the term refers to heroin.

== See also ==
- Opioid addiction in West Africa
- Brown (disambiguation)
