= Jong Chiefdom =

- Chiefdom
- Location in Sierra Leone
- Country: Sierra Leone
- Province: Southern Province
- District: Bonthe District
- Capital: Mattru
- Time zone: UTC+0 (GMT)

Jong Chiefdom is a chiefdom in Bonthe District of Sierra Leone. Its capital is Mattru.
