= Ishmael Beah =

Sierra Leonean author and human rights activist (born 1980)

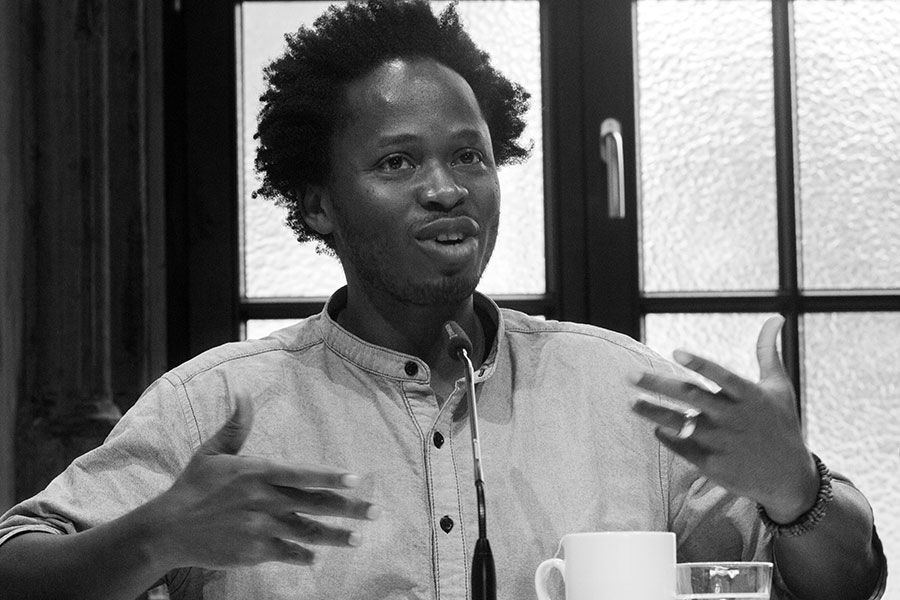
- Beah in 2016
- Born: Ishmael Beah; 23 November 1980 (age 45); Mogbwemo, Bonthe District, Sierra Leone
- Occupations: Author; UNICEF Goodwill Ambassador for Children Affected by War; human rights activist; former child soldier
- Relatives: Junior Beah; Ibrahim Beah (siblings); Priscillia Kounkou Hoveyda (wife)
- Writing career
- Notable works: A Long Way Gone; Little Family; Radiance of Tomorrow

Ishmael Beah (born 23 November 1980) is a Sierra Leonean author and human rights activist who rose to fame with his acclaimed memoir, A Long Way Gone. His novel Radiance of Tomorrow was published in January 2014. His most recent novel Little Family was published in April 2020.

== Biography ==
In 1991, the Sierra Leone Civil War started. Rebels invaded Beah's hometown, Mogbwemo, located in the Southern Province of Sierra Leone, and he was forced to flee. Separated from his family, he spent months wandering south with a group of other boys. At the age of 13, he was forced to become a child soldier. According to Beah's account, he fought for almost three years before being rescued by UNICEF. Beah fought for the government army against the rebels. In 1997, he fled Freetown by the help of the UNICEF due to the increasing violence and found his way to New York City, where he lived with Laura Simms, his foster mother. In New York City, Beah attended the United Nations International School. After high school, he enrolled at Oberlin College and graduated in 2004 with a degree in political science.

Beah says he does not remember how many people he killed during his time in the Sierra Leonean government army. He and other soldiers smoked marijuana and sniffed amphetamines and "brown-brown", a mix of cocaine and gunpowder. He blames the addictions and the brainwashing for his violence and cites them and the pressures of the army as reasons for his inability to escape on his own: "If you left, it was as good as being dead."

During a 14 February 2007 appearance on The Daily Show with host Jon Stewart, Beah said that he believed that returning to civilized society was more difficult than the act of becoming a child soldier, saying that dehumanising children is a relatively easy task. Rescued in 1996 by a coalition of UNICEF and NGOs, he found the transition difficult. He and his fellow child soldiers fought frequently. He credits one volunteer, Nurse Esther, with having the patience and compassion required to bring him through the difficult period. She recognized his interest in American rap music and reggae since he was a kid, gave him a Walkman and a Run-DMC cassette, and employed music as his bridge to his past, prior to the violence. Slowly, he accepted her assurances that "it's not your fault."

Living in Freetown with an uncle, he went to school and was invited to speak in 1996 at the UN in New York. When Freetown was overrun by the joined forces of the rebels (RUF or Revolutionary United Front) and Army of Sierra Leone in 1997 (the Army of Sierra Leone was originally fighting against the RUF), he contacted Laura Simms, whom he had met the year before in New York, and made his way to the United States.

"If I choose to feel guilty for what I have done, I will want to be dead myself," Beah said. "I live knowing that I have been given a second life, and I just try to have fun, and be happy and live it the best I can."

In 2009, the 29-year-old travelled home to Sierra Leone with an ABC News camera, a return that he describes as bittersweet. Later in February 2013, he travelled to Calgary and spoke at the My World Conference.

In 2013, Beah married French-born Congolese Iranian Priscillia Kounkou Hoveyda. They have three children and are based in Los Angeles.

== Awards, recognition and works ==
A Long Way Gone was nominated for a Quill Award in the Best Debut Author category for 2007. Time magazine's Lev Grossman named it one of the Top 10 Nonfiction Books of 2007, ranking it at No. 3, and praising it as "painfully sharp", and its ability to take "readers behind the dead eyes of the child-soldier in a way no other writer has." The book was also included in Amazon's 100 books to read in a lifetime list.

With his novel, Radiance of Tomorrow, Beah explores the life of a community including Benjamin and Bockarie, two friends who return to Bockarie's hometown, Imperi, after the civil war. The village is in ruins, the ground covered in bones. Radiance of Tomorrow is said to be 'written with the moral urgency of a parable and the searing precision of a firsthand account'. It earned positive reviews in the New York Times Book Review, The Washington Post, and the Boston Globe.

On January 24, 2020, Beah spoke, together with Romeo Dallaire and Omar Khadr, at a conference at Dalhousie University, on human rights and child soldiers.

In April 2020, Beah published his third book, Little Family. A "deeply affecting novel", Little Family tells the story of five young people living at the margins of society and struggling to replace the homes they have lost with the one they have created together.

== Controversy ==
Reporting in The Australian, a conservative Australian daily newspaper published by a subsidiary of the Murdoch-owned News Corp, called into question the accuracy of some events and the chronology in A Long Way Gone, particularly the claim that Beah became a child soldier in 1993, rather than in 1995. Beah has defended his account.

== Bibliography ==
- —— (2020). Little Family: A Novel. Riverhead Books. ISBN 9780735211773.
- —— (2014). Radiance of Tomorrow: A Novel. Sarah Crichton Books. ISBN 9780374246020.
- —— (2007). A Long Way Gone: Memoirs of a Boy Soldier. Sarah Crichton Books. ISBN 9780374105235.

=== Essays and short works ===
- Beah, Ishmael (2000). "When Good Comes from Bad". Nuclear Age Peace Foundation.

== See also ==
- Children of War (2009) documentary by Bryan Single
- P. W. Singer investigator and author of Children at War (2005)
- China Keitetsi, Ugandan former child soldier
