= Jong River =

Jong Taia
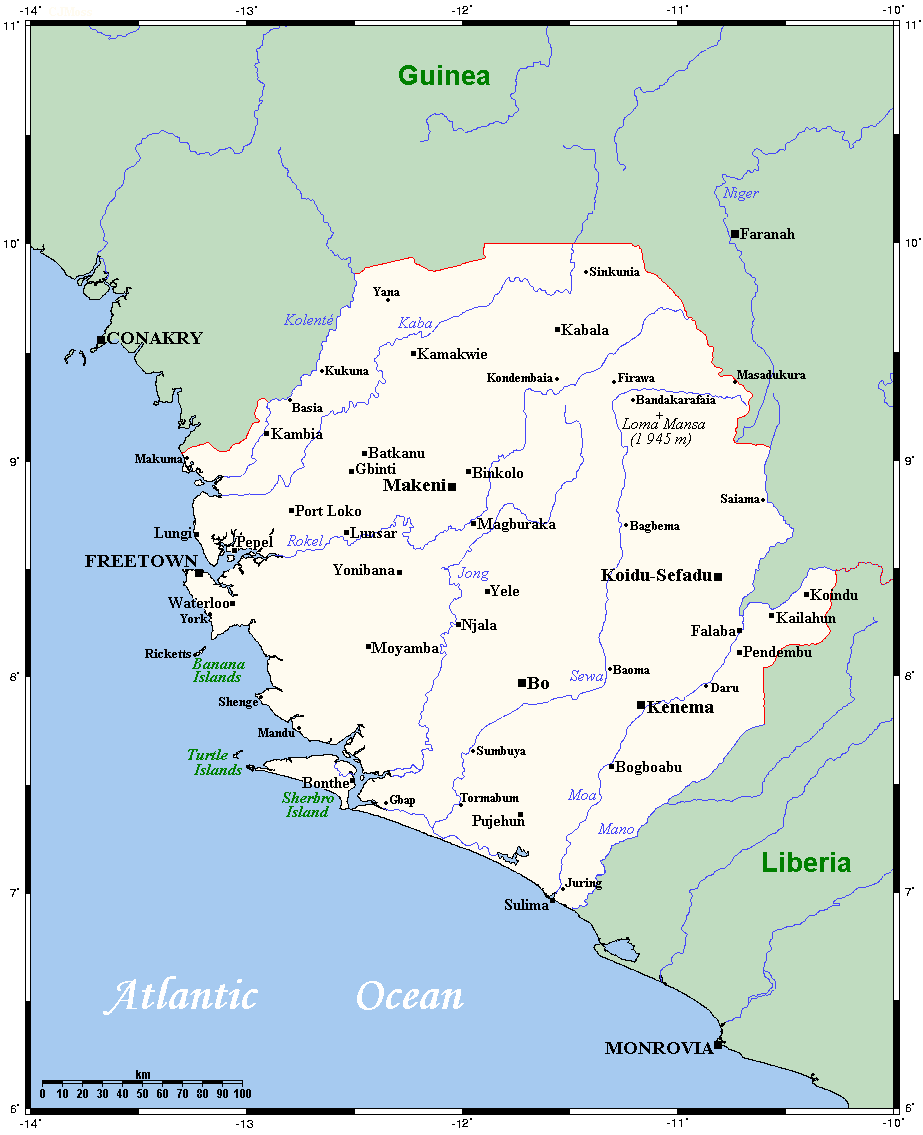
- Map of Sierra Leone with Jong River.

Location
- Country: Sierra Leone
- Province: Eastern, Southern

Physical characteristics
- Source
  - location: Confluence of the Pampana River and Teye River
  - coordinates: 8.3907°N 11.9973°W
  - elevation: 63 m (207 ft)
- Mouth: Sherbro River (Atlantic Ocean)
  - coordinates: 7.5540°N 12.3546°W
  - elevation: 0 m (0 ft)
- Length: 249 km (155 mi)
- Basin size: 8,288 km^{2} (3,200 mi^{2})
- Discharge
  - location: Near mouth
  - average: (Period: 1971–2000) 477 m^{3}/s (16,800 cu ft/s)

Basin features
- River system: Jong River
- Tributaries
  - left: Bende Creek, Yaigini Creek

The Jong or Taia river is a river flowing through Sierra Leone. It passes by the city of Mattru Jong, and flows into the Atlantic Ocean via some deltas.
