= Sogbini Chiefdom =

- Chiefdom
- Interactive map of Sogbini Chiefdom
- Country: Sierra Leone
- Province: Southern Province
- District: Bonthe District
- Capital: Tihun
- Time zone: UTC+0 (GMT)

Sogbini Chiefdom is a chiefdom in Bonthe District of Sierra Leone. Its chiefdom headquarter is Tihun. Farming is the major economic production in the chiefdom. The Sherbro people make up the overwhelming majority of the population of Sogbini Chiefdom. The current President of Sierra Leone Julius Maada Bio, is a native of Sogbini Chiefdom, and an ethnic Sherbro himself.
