= Bonthe =

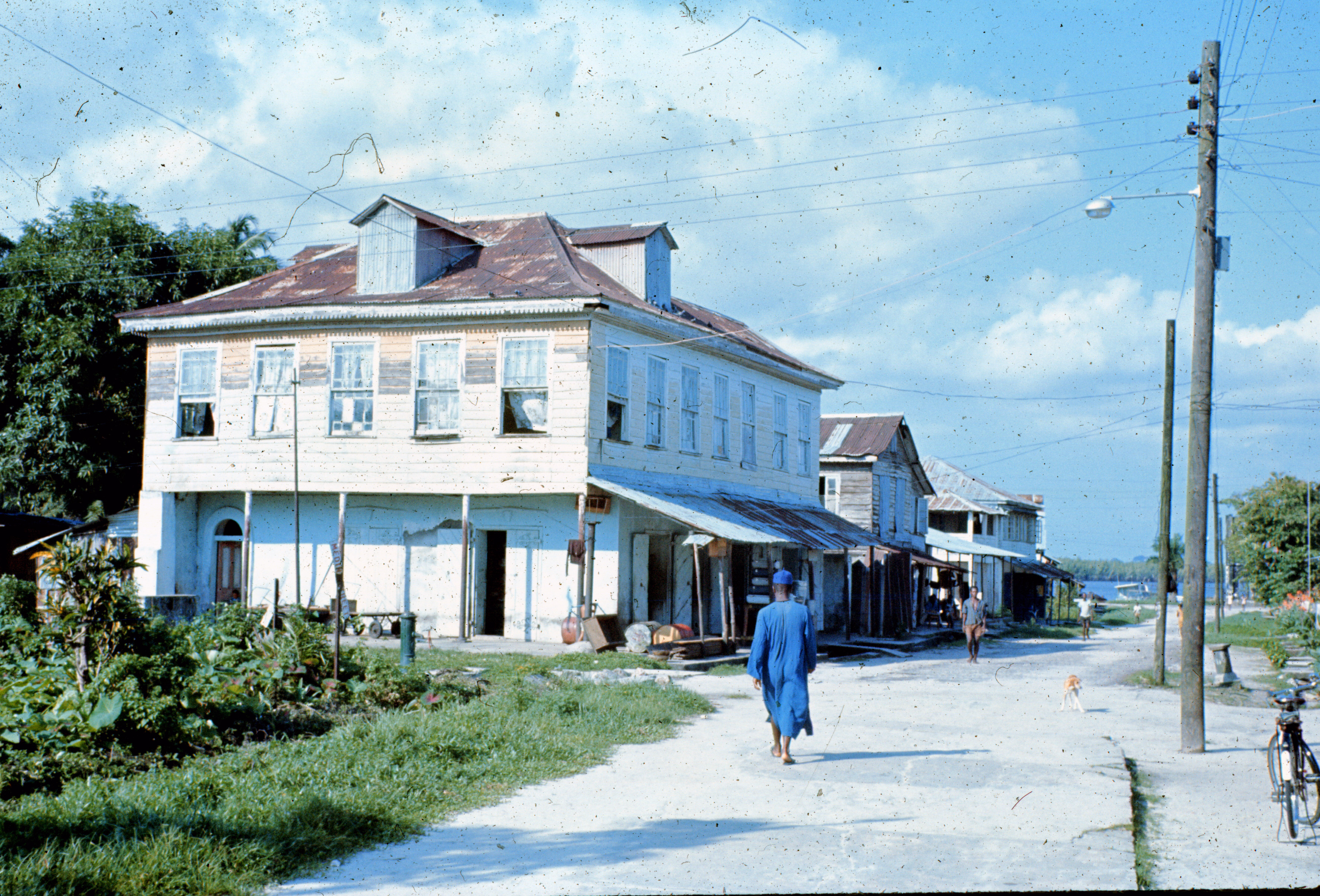
- Medina Street, Bonthe

- Location in Sierra Leone
- Coordinates: 7°31′35″N 12°30′18″W
- Country: Sierra Leone
- Province: Southern Province
- District: Bonthe District

Government
  - Type: City council
  - Mayor: Layemin Joe Sandi (SLPP)

Population (2010)
  - Total: 10,206 (estimated)
- Time zone: UTC-5 (GMT)

Bonthe is a coastal town located on Sherbro Island in Bonthe District in the southern Province of Sierra Leone. The town lies on the eastern shore of Sherbro Island, on the Sherbro River estuary. Bonthe is about 60 miles south-west of Bo and 187 miles south-east of Freetown.

Bonthe is by far the smallest of Sierra Leone's six municipalities and is directly governed by a city council, headed by a mayor. The municipality of Bonthe had a population of 9,535 in the 2004 census, with a current estimate of 10,206.

The major industry in Bonthe is fishing. In colonial times the town used to be a major trading centre for piassava and other agricultural products.

The population of Bonthe is ethnically diverse, though mainly from the Sherbro, and Mende ethnic groups. As with most parts of Sierra Leone, the Krio language of the Sierra Leone Creole people is by far the most widely spoken language in Bonthe and is the primary means of communication in the city.

== Media ==
The local radio station in Bonthe is Radio Bontico 96.4. The Sierra Leone Broadcasting Services (SLBS) TV, is on the air in the city.

== Climate ==
Climate data for Bonthe, Sierra Leone (1960-1990, WMO Station number: 61866)
| Month | Jan | Feb | Mar | Apr | May | Jun | Jul | Aug | Sep | Oct | Nov | Dec | Year |
|---|---|---|---|---|---|---|---|---|---|---|---|---|---|
| Mean daily maximum °C (°F) | 31.3 (88.3) | 32.4 (90.3) | 33.1 (91.6) | 32.5 (90.5) | 31.7 (89.1) | 30.1 (86.2) | 28.5 (83.3) | 28.3 (82.9) | 29.4 (84.9) | 30.5 (86.9) | 31.2 (88.2) | 31.1 (88.0) | 30.8 (87.5) |
| Daily mean °C (°F) | 26.7 (80.1) | 27.2 (81.0) | 27.8 (82.0) | 28.1 (82.6) | 27.5 (81.5) | 26.6 (79.9) | 25.4 (77.7) | 25.3 (77.5) | 25.8 (78.4) | 26.6 (79.9) | 27.0 (80.6) | 26.9 (80.4) | 26.7 (80.1) |
| Mean daily minimum °C (°F) | 22.7 (72.9) | 22.1 (71.8) | 23.4 (74.1) | 23.7 (74.7) | 23.6 (74.5) | 23.3 (73.9) | 22.8 (73.0) | 22.9 (73.2) | 23.0 (73.4) | 23.1 (73.6) | 23.4 (74.1) | 23.1 (73.6) | 23.1 (73.6) |
| Average rainfall mm (inches) | 6.2 (0.24) | 10.1 (0.40) | 25.1 (0.99) | 89.1 (3.51) | 203.6 (8.02) | 574.0 (22.60) | 844.2 (33.24) | 824.5 (32.46) | 557.0 (21.93) | 333.6 (13.13) | 147.9 (5.82) | 49.2 (1.94) | 3,664.5 (144.28) |
| Average rainy days (≥ 0.1 mm) | 1 | 1 | 3 | 7 | 17 | 24 | 26 | 26 | 24 | 22 | 13 | 4 | 168 |
| Average relative humidity (%) (at 15 Local time) | 61 | 59 | 59 | 62 | 70 | 78 | 82 | 83 | 80 | 75 | 72 | 67 | 71 |
| Average dew point °C (°F) | 22.8 (73.0) | 23.0 (73.4) | 23.5 (74.3) | 23.5 (74.3) | 24.3 (75.7) | 24.0 (75.2) | 23.5 (74.3) | 23.4 (74.1) | 23.7 (74.7) | 23.9 (75.0) | 24.1 (75.4) | 23.6 (74.5) | 23.6 (74.5) |
| Mean monthly sunshine hours | 186.0 | 176.4 | 182.9 | 162.0 | 148.8 | 117.0 | 68.2 | 49.6 | 87.0 | 148.8 | 159.0 | 173.6 | 1,659.3 |
Source 1: NOAA (mean temperature data: 1960–1990, all other data: 1961–1990)
Source 2: HKO
