= Mattru Jong =

Mattru Jong, Sierra Leone
- Location in Sierra Leone
- Coordinates: 7°36′N 12°10′W
- Country: Sierra Leone
- Province: Southern Province
- District: Bonthe District
- Chiefdom: Jong Chiefdom

Government
  - Paramount Chief: Alie Badara Sheriff
  - District Council Chairman: Moses Probyn (PMDC)

Population (2014)
  - Total: about 20,000
- Time zone: UTC+0 (GMT)

Mattru Jong commonly known as Mattru (sometimes spelled Matru) is the capital of Bonthe District in the Southern Province of Sierra Leone. Mattru Jung is located on the mainland of Bonthe District, along the Jong River, 52 miles southwest of Bo. The town is the seat of Jong Chiefdom, and is the home of Mongerewa Jong Paramount Chief Alie Badara Sheriff III. The town's current estimated population is about 20,000 people. In 2010 it was 8,199, and in the 2004 census the town had a population of 7,647.

The main industries in Mattru Jong are fishing, rice-growing, cassava-farming, and palm oil production. The town is largely inhabited by the native Sherbro and Mende people. The town has several secondary schools, a major hospital and a police station, operated by the Sierra Leone Police Force.

== Name and founding legend ==
The name Mattru Jong is said to be derived from the Mende words "Mo-Tewoo," meaning "Place of the Buffalos." According to legend a hunter from Senehun, a village on the bank of the Jong river, canoed across the river in search of game. He was successful in capturing and slaughtering a large buffalo on the opposite side of the river. As more hunters found out about the location and its plentiful supply of buffalo, people began to settle there, rather than return across the river to Senehun.

== Hospital ==
Mattru Hospital was founded as a dispensary in 1950 by missionary nurses from the United Brethren in Christ (UBC). By 1959 the dispensary had become a 15-bed hospital. The hospital continued to grow in capacity during the 1960s and 1970s, and by 1981 Mattru Hospital had grown to 69 beds, with pediatrics, obstetrics, surgical, and outpatient units, and x-ray and laboratory facilities.

In 1994 the hospital was shut down because of the threat of civil war violence, and international personnel working in the hospital were evacuated from the country. The hospital was destroyed by Revolutionary United Front (RUF) rebels during the war.

After the war, Mattru Hospital was rebuilt and reopened by Doctors Without Borders in 2001. They turned the hospital over to the UBC's Sierra Leone Conference in 2002.

In October 2009 the United Nations Population Fund (UNFPA) provided funding through the office of Sierra Leone's First Lady, Sia Nyama Koroma to refurbish and "re-brand" the hospital as a "centre of excellence."

On March 31, 2010 President Ernest Bai Koroma visited Mattru Jong Hospital in order to assess its preparedness for the planned April 27, 2010 rollout of free medical services for pregnant women, lactating mothers, and children under the age of five. Staffing, electricity supply and confusion over the hospital's funding status (as a part mission-, part government-run entity) were seen as the major challenges to the hospital's effectiveness.

== Civil war ==
RUF rebels fighting in the Sierra Leone Civil War captured Mattru Jong at the end of January, 1995. They faced little military resistance as the Sierra Leone Army (SLA) had already withdrawn from the town. Earlier in January the RUF had briefly taken over the Sierra Rutile Company mine in Imperi Chiefdom, Bonthe District, about 10 miles north west of Mattru Jong, but it was recaptured by the end of January. Most of the RUF forces who captured Mattru Jong entered from the direction of Imperi Chiefdom but some may have come from Sumbaya, Lugbu Chiefdom, Bo District, about fifteen miles east of Mattru Jong. Upon settling in Mattru Jong, the RUF set up its own governing structures in the town. The RUF stole medical supplies from the hospital and used it as a training base. Another base known as "Camp Lion" was set up at Gambia Palm Oil Plantation, nine miles from Mattru Jong. The RUF remained in Mattru Jong for eight months until it was recaptured by the SLA in October, 1995.

== Communications ==
Mobile phone company Airtel provides coverage of the Mattru Jong area. The service was launched in 2006 by Celtel (now owned by and renamed Airtel). A Western Union branch is located in the town.

== Visits by First Lady ==
Mattru Jong has been visited by Sierra Leone's First Lady, Madam Sia Nyama Koroma once in 2009 and once in 2010. In February 2009 Madam Koroma addressed supporters of the All People’s Congress (APC) at the compound of Late Paramount Chief Goba in Mattru Jong. According to a statement released by her office, some of the issues faced by people in Bonthe district that she had identified during her visit included "improper health care delivery, poor infrastructure, poor water and sanitation and inadequate means to transport their agricultural produce from place to place". In February 2010 it was reported that Madam Koroma would be visiting Bonthe District, including Mattru Jong, as part of an effort to investigate the district's health care needs, especially those of women. A meeting with the board of Mattru Jong Hospital was scheduled and Madam Koroma was also expected to give the keynote speech at a graduation ceremony for nurses who had been trained at the hospital.

== A Long Way Gone ==
The town was featured prominently in the book A Long Way Gone by Ishmael Beah, a memoir of the author's experiences during the Sierra Leone Civil War. Beah and his brother were visiting Mattru Jong with a group of friends when he learned that his home village of Mogbwemo had been attacked by rebels. Beah and his friends remained in Mattru Jong until the rebels arrived there about one month later.
