= Gbap =

- Location in Sierra Leone
- Coordinates: 7°22′35″N 12°15′42″W
- Country: Sierra Leone
- Province: Southern Province
- District: Bonthe District
- Time zone: UTC-5 (GMT)

Gbap is a small rural fishing town in Nongoba Bullom Chiefdom, Bonthe District, in the Southern Province of Sierra Leone. The Sherbro people mainly inhabit the town. Gbap is the traditional home of the Sherbro Family, descendants of an English slave trader and a Sherbro princess. It is also the birthplace of Patricia Kabbah (who is also one of the Sherbro and the niece of Peter L. Tucker, former First Lady of Sierra Leone and wife of Ahmad Tejan Kabbah, Sierra Leone's third President. The current paramount chief of Gbap Nongoba Bullom is Rugiatu Inatorma Sasay Bumpeh II.
