= Jessica Dee Humphreys =

Canadian author, indexer, and journalist

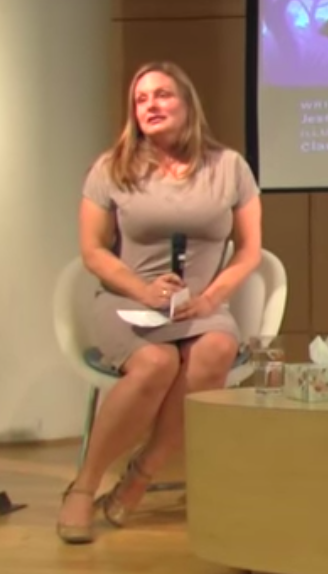
- Humphreys in 2015
- Education: University of Toronto (HonB.A), Queen's University (M.A.)
- Occupation: Author
- Writing career
- Notable works: Child Soldier and Waiting for First Light
- Website: www.jessicadeehumphreys.com

Jessica Dee Humphreys is a Canadian writer specializing in international humanitarian and children's issues.

== Education ==
Humphreys received her Honours Bachelor of Arts in English Literature and Linguistics from the University of Toronto, and her Master of Arts degree in English Literature from Canada's Queen's University. She then held an internship at the United Nations Development Fund for Women in New York.

== Career ==
Jessica Humphreys has written two books for children Child Soldier: When Boys and Girls are Used in War and The International Day of the Girl: Celebrating Girls Around the World (foreword by Rona Ambrose).

She has also co-authored three books with Roméo Dallaire The Peace Waiting for First Light: My Ongoing Battle with PTSD and They Fight Like Soldiers, They Die Like Children

Additionally, Humphreys has contributed chapters to several books, ghostwritten others, and was a regular contributor to the Toronto Star from 2020 to 2023.

== Awards and recognition ==
Humphreys was nominated for the 2022 Ontario Library Association Forest of Reading Award and won the 2021 Skipping Stones Honour Award. She was awarded the 2017 Ontario Library Association's Forest of Reading Red Maple Award for children's non-fiction, the 2015 Best Bet for Junior Non-Fiction from the Ontario Library Association, the 2016 Skipping Stones Honour Award, the Children’s Literature Roundtable of Canada Honour Book of 2016, and starred reviews from the School Library Journal and Quill and Quire, plus nominations for the 2016 Eisner Award Best Publication for Kids, the 2016 Norma Fleck Award for Canadian Children’s Non-Fiction, the 2016 Canadian Library Association’s Book of the Year for Children, the Joe Shuster Dragon Award, the 2016-2017 Hackmatack Children’s Choice Book Award, the Young Adult Library Services Association's ‘Great Graphic Novel for Teens 2016’, the American Library Association’s 2016 Notable Children’s Book, and the 2017 Forest of Reading Golden Oak award for non-fiction. Her book Waiting for First Light, was longlisted for the Taylor Prize for Literary Non-Fiction and for CBC's Canada Reads competition. Her work was included in the National Post's list of Best Books of 2016 and the 2010 Globe and Mail's Top 100: Non-fiction.

== Publications ==
- The Peace, Random House Canada 2024 ISBN 9781039011274
- Saving the Planet: The Leading Environmentalists (contributor), New Federation House 2023 ISBN 978-1-987832-38-9
- Waiting for First Light, Random House Canada 2016 ISBN 978-0-345-81443-2
- Child Soldier, Kids Can Press 2015 ISBN 978-1-77138-126-0
- To Three and Beyond (contributor), Praeclarus Press 2014 ISBN 978-1-939807-16-8
- They Fight Like Soldiers, They Die Like Children, Vintage Canada 2010 ISBN 978-0-307-35577-5
- The International Day of the Girl: Celebrating Girls Around the World (Foreword by Rona Ambrose), Kids Can Press 2020 ISBN 978-1-525-30058-5
