= Gelatinase biosynthesis-activating pheromone =

Gelatinase biosynthesis activating pheromone

Identifiers
- Organism: Enterococcus faecalis
- Symbol: fsrD
- UniProt: G8ADN7
Search for
- Structures: Swiss-model
- Domains: InterPro

Gelatinase biosynthesis-activating pheromone abbreviated as GBAP is a cyclic peptide produced by pathogenic bacteria such as Enterococcus faecalis. GAP is part of the quorum sensing system of certain bacteria where it positively regulates the expression of gelatinase and serine proteases that are under the control of the gelE-sprE operon.

GBAP is an 11-amino-acid-residue cyclic peptide containing a lactone linkage between the C-terminal carboxylic acid group and a serine side chain hydroxyl group.
