= Nongoba Bullom Chiefdom =

- Chiefdom
- Interactive map of Nongoba Bullom Chiefdom
- Coordinates: 7°22′57″N 12°14′48″W
- Country: Sierra Leone
- Province: Southern Province
- District: Bonthe District
- Capital: Bullom
- Time zone: UTC+0 (GMT)

Nongoba Bullom Chiefdom is a chiefdom in Bonthe District of Sierra Leone. The Current Paramount Chief is Rugiatu Inatorma Sasay Bumpeh II. Madam Inatorma is the first female Paramount Chief in Nongoba Bullom Chiefdom. She took over from the late Jonathan Karba Karba Tucker, a Sherbro, who was elected in 2010. The chief during the war, Charlie Bawulle Tucker, fled in 1995 and did not return until 2002.

Nongoba Bullom Chiefdom has 13 sections, and these sections have 21 tiny villages. Bullom Sections. Gbap Section. Torma-Subu Section. Kessie Section. Haahun Section. Baoma Section. Manyemi section. Saalma Section. Solon Section. Gbangbassa Section. Bohui Section. Ngarnga Section. Pelewahun Section.

The people of Nongoba Bullom are both Bullom and Sherbro. The chiefdom gets its name from Nongoba, a bullom fisherman from Pujehun, who entered the area on a fishing expedition, moving through Kwamabai Krim. He settled in Gbap alongside the Sherbro and developed a prosperous fishing business. He made peace with many local people and had many wives.

The current chief is Rugiatu Inatorma Sasay Bumpeh, elected in 2024.

Its capital is [Bullom].
