= Bonthe District =

- Coordinates: 7°30′N 12°30′W
- Country: Sierra Leone
- Province: Southern Province
- Capital: Bonthe Island
- Largest city: Bonthe

Government
  - Type: Bonthe Municipality
  - Mayor: His Worship Mayor Layemin Joe Sandi (SLPP)

Area
  - Total: 3,468 km^{2} (1,339 sq mi)

Population (2021 census)
  - Total: 297,561
  - Density: 85.80/km^{2} (222.2/sq mi)
- Time zone: UTC0 (Greenwich Mean Time)
- HDI (2017): 0.405 low · 5th
- Website: https://web.archive.org/web/20160304110241/http://www.bonthedc.net/

Bonthe District is a district that comprises several islands and mainland of the Atlantic Ocean in the Southern Province of Sierra Leone. Bonthe is one of the sixteen districts of Sierra Leone. Its capital is the town of Bonthe Island and its largest city is Bonthe, on Sherbro Island. As of the 2015 census, the district had a population of 200,730. Bonthe District is one of the sixteen districts of Sierra Leone. Bonthe District is subdivided into eleven chiefdoms.

The District occupies a total area of 3,468 km². The District of Bonthe borders the Atlantic Ocean to the west, Moyamba District to the northwest, Bo District to the southeast and Pujehun District to the south. The fifth and current President of Sierra Leone Julius Maada Bio is from Bonthe District.

Bonthe district is largely made up of two main ethnic groups; the Sherbro and Mende. Bonthe district is the native home of the Sherbro people who make up a large minority of the district population. Bonthe district has a large population of both Muslims and Christians.

Bonthe District has one of the world's largest deposits of titanium ore (rutile) in the world. Sierra Rutile Limited, owned by a consortium of US and European investors, began commercial mining operations in Bonthe in early 1979. Due to poor mining policy, the region has little to show for this huge economic potential.

== Demography ==
Bonthe District is mainly inhabited by the Mende and Sherbro people. The Mende are the largest ethnic group in the district; followed by the Sherbro people.

== Religion ==
Religion in Bonthe District (2015)
Religion	Percent(%)
Islam	85.4%
Christianity	13.1%
Baháʼí	0.0%
Traditional African religions	0.0%
Other	1.4%
No Religion	0.1%

== Government ==
Bonthe District is divided into two political administrations; the district headquarters town on Sherbro Island is headed by a Municipal Mayor, and the mainland is governed by a district council Chairman based in Mattru Jong. The Bonthe District is headed by the mayor; he and the District Council Chairman are the highest local government officials in the district of Bonthe. The District Council Chairman and the Municipal Mayor are responsible for the general management of the district and for seeing that all local laws are enforced. The District Council Chairman is elected directly by the residents where the District Council is governed and also the mayor is elected by residents of Bonthe Municipality. The current mayor of Bonthe Municipality is His Worship Mayor Layemin Joe Sandi and the District Council Chairman of Bonthe District Council is Mr. Moese Jude Probyn of the Sierra Leone People's Party (SLPP). There were elected in the 2018 Sierra Leone local government election.

=== Members of Parliament ===
Bonthe District is a stronghold of the Sierra Leone People's Party (SLPP). In the 2018 Sierra Leone presidential and parliamentary Elections, the SLPP won the majority (99.9%) of the votes in the Bonthe District. The party also won all three seats in the Sierra Leone Parliament from Bonthe District.

The District has only three Representatives in the Parliament of Sierra Leone, of which all four were elected for a 5-year term in the 2018 Sierra Leone General Elections. The district is a stronghold of the SLPP party. Below is the list of Representatives in the Sierra Leonean Parliament:

Name	Party
Sengepo Thomas	SLPP
Moses A. Edwin	SLPP
Alicen Jebbeh Kumabeh	SLPP
Moses Baimba Jorkie	SLPP
P.C. Badara	Non party-allied

== Administrative divisions ==
=== Chiefdoms ===
==== Pre-2017 ====
Prior to the 2017 local administrative reorganization, Bonthe District was made up of eleven chiefdoms as the third level of administrative subdivision.

1. Bendu – Cha Bendu
2. Bum – Madina
3. Dema – Tissana
4. Imperri – Gbangbama
5. Jong – Mattru
6. Kpanda – Kemo Motuo
7. Kwamebai Krim – Benduma
8. Nongoba Bullom – Gbap
9. Sittia – Yonni
10. Sogbini – Tihun
11. Yawbeko – Talia

==== Post-2017 ====
After the 2017 local administrative reorganization, Bonthe District has made up of twelve chiefdoms as the third level of administrative subdivision.

1. Bendu – Cha Bendu
2. Bum – Madina
3. Dema – Tissana
4. Imperri – Gbangbama
5. Jong – Mattru
6. Kpanda Kemo – Kemo Motuo
7. Kwamebai Krim – Benduma
8. Nongoba Bullom – Gbap
9. Sittia – Yonni
10. Sogbini – Tihun
11. Yawbeko – Talia
12. Bonthe Urban (Note: Formerly part of Sittia Chiefdom.) – Bonthe

Notes

Although the headquarters town, Bonthe, is located on Sherbro Island, it is part of neither of the two chiefdoms on the island: Sittia and Dema. Instead, the town is part of the Bonthe Sherbro Municipality, outside of the chiefdom administrative structure.

=== Major towns ===
- Bonthe, district capital (2012 estimated pop. 8,344)
- Bonthe Island

== Economy ==
The main economic activities include fishing, rice growing and palm oil plantations. Mattru is the main city, located 52 miles southwest of Bo, along the Jong River, which provides access to Sherbro Island and the Atlantic Ocean.

== Effects of the civil war ==
Bonthe District was first among the districts in the Southern Province to undertake voluntary resettlement of internally displaced persons (IDPs) in 1997 among all economic hardship and combatant activities. The District suffered the mass exodus of IDPs when Sierra Rutile Company (the largest foreign exchange earner, taxpayer and employer of mine workers) suffered damage and destruction when attacked by fighting forces in 1995, and during all phases of the war. The company terminated its operations.

Many indigenes, however, believe that the resettlement and rehabilitation activities of IDPs and the restart of mining operations will help fast-track the recovery process. They believe this could complement the government in the consolidation of peace and the drive for recovery.

== See also ==
- Sierra Leone
- Sierra Leone Civil War
