= Neil Boothby =

American psychologist

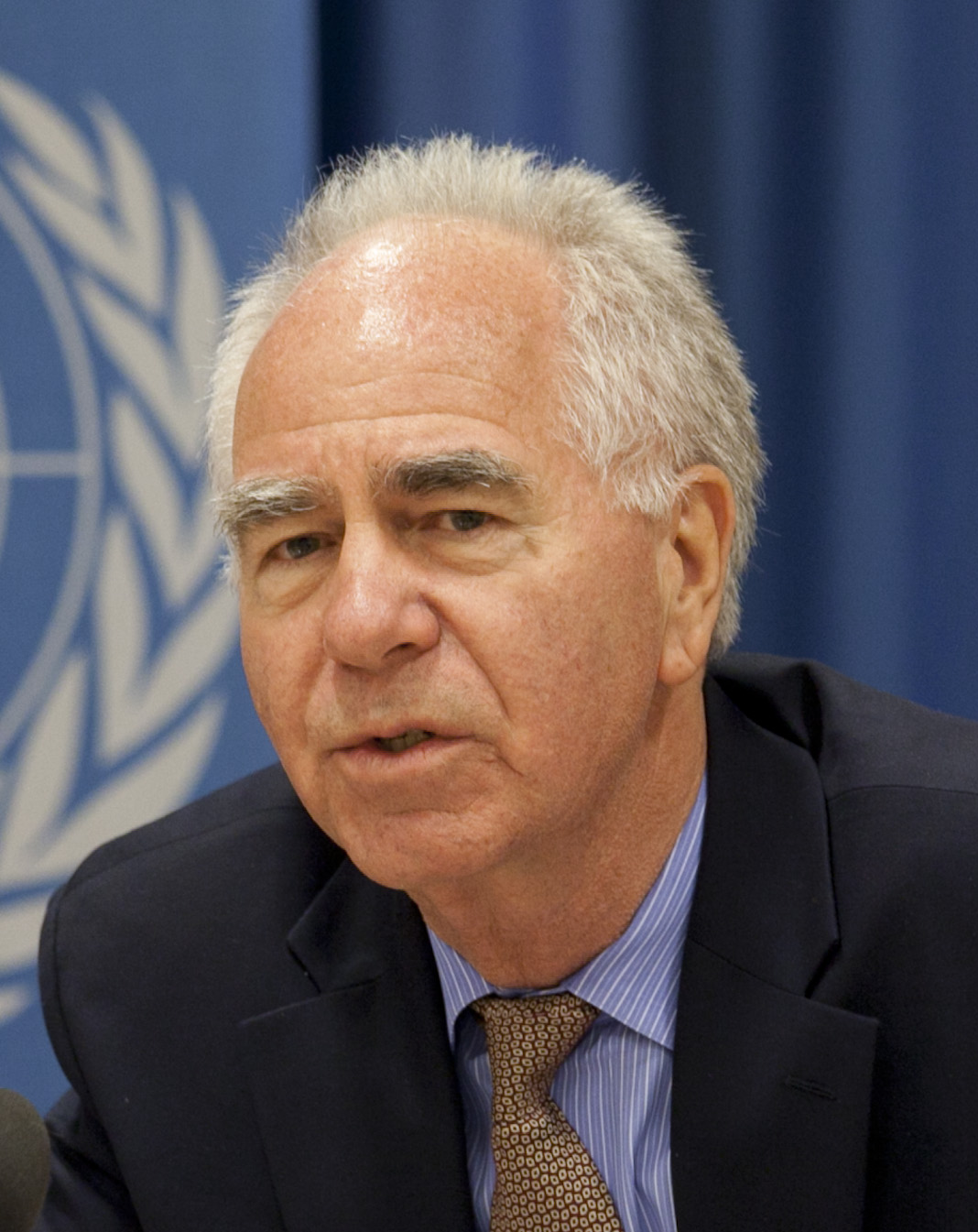
Neil Boothby (2012)

Dr. Neil Boothby is a psychologist and former US Government special advisor and senior coordinator to the USAID administrator on Children in Adversity, and former director of the Program on Forced Migration and Health at the Columbia University Mailman School of Public Health. Currently, he is the founding Director of the Global Center for the Development of the Whole Child at the University of Notre Dame (go.nd.edu/globalchild). His research focuses on the psychosocial consequences of organized violence on children. As a senior representative of UNICEF, UNHCR, and Save the Children, he has worked for more than 25 years with children in crises in Africa, Asia, Latin America, and Eastern Europe and is an internationally recognized expert and advocate for children affected by war and displacement. He has received numerous awards for his work on behalf of war-affected children, including the Red Cross International Humanitarian of the Year Award, the Mickey Leland Award, the United Nations' Golden Achievement Award for Social Services, and Duke University's Humanitarian Service Award.

== Career ==
In the late 1980s Boothby was a psychologist at Duke University, and he worked for Save the Children at the Lhanguene children's center helping children who had been traumatized by exposure to armed conflict in Mozambique. He also served as an advisor to the Mozambican Ministry of Health in the attempt to develop national programs to address this problem.

Boothby's own research has focused on the effects of armed conflict and violence on children in Cambodia (1980–1982), Mozambique (1988–2005), Guatemala (1983–1986), former Yugoslavia (1992–1993), Rwanda (1994–1996), Darfur (2005–present), Palestine (2001-present), Sri Lanka, (2002–present), Uganda, (2005–2011) and Indonesia (1999-present). His longitudinal study of adult outcomes for child soldiers in Mozambique enabled him to identify interventions and community supports linked to positive life outcomes. Lessons learned from the Mozambique research are now being applied through operational agencies to current war-affected countries with large numbers of child soldiers. A second focus of his work has been on children separated from their families during war and refugee emergencies. His cornerstone study showed that many child-family separations are not accidental, but instead result from abductions and misguided agency policies and practices. This observation has been translated into international standards (including in the Convention on the Rights of the Child and UNHCR Refugee Policy) and inter-agency guidelines (International Committee of the Red Cross-UNICEF-Save the Children-International Rescue Committee).

Boothby has served as principal investigator on numerous research projects. One project focuses on the application of public health methodologies to human rights concerns, specifically development of a method to establish prevalence rates of rape and gender-based violence among refugee women girls, as well as on children associated with fighting forces. A second research project focuses on the development of an evidence base for efficacious child protection programming in crisis situations, in partnerships with operational agencies in five countries: Sierra Leone, Liberia, (northern) Uganda; Sri Lanka; and (Aceh) Indonesia. A general theme emerging from this research is the importance of the household as the main component of protection systems for children.

In 2005, Boothby founded the Care and Protection of Children Interagency Learning Network — a constellation of international and national agencies worldwide working on the development of an evidence base for efficacious child protection programming in war, disaster and post crises settings. The network has engaged in long-term research in eight countries: Central African Republic, Democratic Republic of the Congo, Sierra Leone, Liberia, Uganda, Palestine, Sri Lanka, and Indonesia. Within this context, Boothby helped to create academic centers at the University of Indonesia (Center on Child Protection) and Makerere University (Center for the Study of the African Child).

In 2012, Boothby took a leave of absence from Columbia University to serve as the US government's special adviser and the USAID administrator's senior coordinator for Children in Adversity. Under his leadership, the US Government developed its first ever whole of government foreign assistance policy for children globally. The policy guides some $2.85 billion annual expenditures by nine US government agencies in low and middle income countries. During this time, Boothby also founded the Global Alliance for Children in Adversity, a public-private partnership dedicated to improving the health and wellbeing children in low and middle income countries. Boothby returned to academia in March 2015.

In 2019, Boothby joined the University of Notre Dame as research faculty and founding Director of the Global Center for the Development of the Whole Child, which is housed within the university's Institute for Educational Initiatives. His interdisciplinary teams strives to make certain positive outcomes for children and youth who face adversity. Currently, the Initiative works with non-governmental organizations, policy makers, communities and other stakeholders in seven countries: Colombia, Democratic Republic of Congo, Haiti, India, Kenya, Tanzania, and Peru. The goal of their work is to create environments that "not only fulfill children's and youth's basic needs, but also promote nurturing relationships, socio-emotional skills, and civic engagement."

He received a D.Ed. from Harvard University.(https://ncdp.columbia.edu)

== Publications ==
Boothby has published extensively on risk and resilience among war and disaster affected children, and is also the recipient of numerous awards for his field work.

=== Selected works ===
- McNatt Z., Zebib L., Chandler, H., Freels, P.E., Alshannaq, H., Majdalani, N., Mahmoud, A., Majd, E., and Boothby, N. (2018-in press), Exploring separation among Syrian refugee families in Jordan: A qualitative approach, Journal of Refugee Studies, Oxford UK
- Bennouna, C., Fischer, H.T., Wessells, M. and Boothby, N. (2018) Rethinking Child Protection in Emergencies, International Journal of Child Health and Nutrition, 7, p. 39-46
- G. Huebner, N. Boothby, J. L. Aber, G. Darmstadt, A. Diaz, A. S. Masten, H. Yoshikawa, I. Redlener, A. Emmel, M. Pitt, L. Arnold, B. Barber, B. Berman, R. Blum, M. Canavera, J. Eckerle, N. A. Fox, J. L. Gibbons, S. W. Hargarten, C. Landers, C. A. Nelson III, S. D. Pollack, V. Rauh, M. Samson, F. Ssewamala, N. St Clair, L. Stark, R. Waldman, M. Wessells, S. L. Wilson, and C. H. Zeanah, (2016) Beyond Survival: The Case for Investing in Young Children Globally, National Academy of Medicine, June 16, 2016: A Discussion Paper
- Boothby, N, (April 2016) U.S. Government Action Plan on Children in Adversity: A Framework for Foreign Assistance, Journal of Peace Studies, American Psychological Association, in press.
- Bennouna, C, van Boetzelaar, E, Rojas, L, Roberts, L, and Boothby, N, (February 2016) Monitoring and Reporting to Enhance the Protection of Education in Situations of Insecurity and Conflict, Disasters, in press.
- Boothby, N., et al. (October 2012), Coordinated and evidence-based policy and practice for protecting children outside of family care, Child Abuse & Neglect 36 (2012) 743– 751
- Boothby, N., et al. (October 2012), What are the most effective early response strategies and interventions to assess and address the immediate needs of children outside of family care? Child Abuse & Neglect 36 (2012), 711–721.
- Stark, L., Kassim, N., Sparling, T., Buscher, D., and Boothby, N. "Assessing the impact of microfinance programming on children: An evaluation from post-tsunami Aceh," submitted to Disaster August 2011.
- Warner, A., Roberts, L., Stark, L., Lehmann, H., Boothby, N. and Ager, A. Measuring the Prevalence and Reporting of Violence against Women and Girls in Liberia Using the 'Neighborhood Method' submitted to Conflict & Health, July 2011.
- Warner, A., Roberts, L., Stark, L., Lehman, H., Boothby, N., Ager, A. Use of the "Neighborhood Method" to assess violence against women and girls in Liberia. PLoS Medicine, (forthcoming).
- Boothby, N. and Stark, L. "Data Surveillance in Child Protection Systems Development: An Indonesian Case Study," Child Abuse and neglect, 35, 2011, 993–1001.
- Ager, A., Akesson, B., Stark, L., Flouri, E., Okot, B., McCollister, F & Boothby, N. "The impact of the school-based Psychosocial Structured Activities (PSSA) program on conflict-affected children in northern Uganda". Journal of Child Psychology and Psychiatry, 2011, 52 (11), 1124–1133.
- Ager, A., Bancroft, C., Stark, L., Berger, L., and Boothby, N. Local Constructions of Gender Based Violence Amongst Internally Displaced Persons In Lira, Northern Uganda: Analyses Using Gender and Age-Segmented Participative Ranking Methodology. (forthcoming)
- Boothby, N., Veatch, M and Pentes, M (2011) Evaluating treatment of axis I mental health disorders in Aceh, Indonesia, The Psychiatrist, 35, 1–8, doi: 10.1192/pb.bp.110.03025
- Stark, L. Roberts, L., Acham, A., Boothby, N., and Ager, A. (2010). Measuring violence against women amidst war and displacement in northern Uganda. The Journal of Epidemiology and Community Health, 64(12).
- Ager, A., Stark, L., Olsen, J. and Boothby, N. (2010) The impact of programming supporting the reintegration of girls formerly abducted by armed groups in Sierra Leone. Girlhood Studies, 3(1).
- Ager, A., Stark, L., Akesson, B., and Boothby, N. (2010) Defining best practice in care and protection of children in crisis-affected settings: A delphi study [of expert practitioners]. Child Development, 81(4).
- Stark, L., Ager, A., Wessells, M. and Boothby, N. (2009). "Developing culturally relevant indicators of reintegration for girls formerly associated with armed groups in Sierra Leone using a participative ranking methodology". Intervention: International Journal of Mental Health, Psychosocial Work and Counselling in Areas of Armed Conflict, 7(1), 4–16.
- Stark, L., Boothby, N. and Ager, A. (2009). "The Reintegration of Children Associated with Fighting Forces: Ten Years on From Cape Town," Disasters, 33 (4), 522–547.
- Stark, L., Roberts, L., Acham, A., Boothby, N., and Ager, A. (2009). "Measuring violence against women amidst war and displacement in Northern Uganda". The Journal of Epidemiology and Community Health.
- Ager, A., Boothby, N. and Bremer, M. (2009). "Using the Framework of the 'Protective Environment' to Analyze the Protection Needs of Children in Darfur." Disasters, 33 (4), 548–573.
- Boothby, N., Stark, L., Simmons, K., and Chu, E. (2009). "Child Protection Information Management Mapping: Towards a Data Surveillance System in Indonesia." UNICEF.
- Boothby, N. (2009). Children and the 2004 Indian Ocean Tsunami: An Evaluation of UNICEF's Protection Response in Aceh Indonesia (2004–2008). New York: UNICEF Evaluation Office.
- Boothby, N. (2009). Children and the 2004 Indian Ocean Tsunami: An Evaluation of UNICEF's Protection Response in the Maldives (2004–2008). New York: UNICEF Evaluation Office.
- Boothby, N. (2009). Children and the 2004 Indian Ocean Tsunami: An Evaluation of UNICEF's Protection Response in Sri Lanka (2004–2008). New York: UNICEF Evaluation Office.
- Boothby, N. (2008). "Political Violence and Development: an Ecological Approach to Children in War Zones", Child and Adolescent Psychiatric Clinics of North America, 17 (3): 497 – 514. doi: 10.1016/j.chc.2008.02.004.
- Ager, A., Boothby, N. and Wessells, M. (2007). The Use of Consensus Methodology in Determining Key Research and Practice Development Questions in the Field of Intervention with Children Associated with Fighting Forces. Intervention, 5 (2): 124–129.
- Boothby N. Ager, A., and Ager W., (2007). "Guide to the evaluation of psychosocial programming in emergencies". New York, NY: Report for UNICEF from the Program on Forced Migration and Health at Columbia University's Mailman School of Public Health.
- Boothby, N., Crawford, J. and Halprin, J. (2006). "Mozambique child soldier life outcome study: Lessons learned in rehabilitation and reintegration efforts. Global Public Health – An International Journal for Research, Policy and Practice, 1(1): 87 – 107.
- Boothby, N. (2006). "What Happens to Child Soldiers When They Grow-up?: The Mozambique Case Study," Intervention: International Journal of Mental Health, Psychosocial Work and Counselling in Areas of Armed Conflict, 4 (3): 244–259.
- Boothby, N., Crawford, J. and Halprin, J. (2006). "The Life Outcomes of Former Mozambican Child Soldiers, Global Public Health," An International Journal for Research, Policy and Practice, Routledge Publishing, (1): 87–104.
- Boothby, N., Newman, J., Tanabe, M., Prowitt-Smith, L., Ager, A., and Wessells, M. (2006). Assessment and evaluation of psychosocial programming for crisis-affected children: a good practice initiative. New York, NY: Report for UNICEF from the Program on Forced Migration and Health at Columbia University's Mailman School of Public Health.
- Boothby, N. and Knudsen, C. (2000). "Children of the Gun," Scientific American, January: 40–45.
- Boothby, N. (1993). "Voices from Ex-Yugoslavia," The Peace Psychology Bulletin, 2 (2): 8–14.
- Boothby, N. (1993). "Care and Placement of Unaccompanied Children: Mozambique's Effort

to Link Grassroots Networks of Volunteers to a National Program," African Journal of Social Development, University of Zimbabwe: 11–22.

- Boothby, N. (1992). "Displaced Children: Psychological Theory and Practice From the Field," Journal of Refugee Studies, 5 (2): 107–122.

=== Books ===
- Boothby, N. War and Refugee Children, New York: Oxford University Press, (in progress).
- Boothby, N., Strang, A., and Wessells, M. A World Turned Upside Down: The Social Ecologies of Children in Armed Conflict, Kumarian Press, November, 2006.
- Boothby, N., Ressler E.M. and de la Soudiere M. (1996) Action Handbook for Unaccompanied Children, UNICEF and UNHCR.
- Boothby, N. and Sultan, A. (1989) Traumatized Children: A Mental Health Training Manual, Maputo, Mozambique: Moderno Press.
- Ressler E. M., Boothby, N. and Steinbock D. (1998) Unaccompanied Children in Emergencies: Care and Protection in Wars, Natural Disasters and Mass Population Movements, New York: Oxford University Press.

== Awards ==
- USAID, Superior Group Achievement Award, 2013.
- American Red Cross Distinguished Service Award, 2010.
- Mickey Leland Award, Outstanding Service on Behalf of Uprooted People, Refugee Voices, Washington D.C., 1990.
- Golden Achievement Award for Social Activities, Work on Behalf of War-Affected Children, Children's Foundation and the United Nations General Assembly, New York, 1990.
- International Humanitarian of the Year Award, Outstanding Contribution to Upholding the Spirit and Principles of the Geneva Convention, International Committee of the Red Cross, Washington D.C., 1989.
- Humanitarian Service Award, Duke University, 1989.
- Lyndhurst Prize, Three Year Leadership Prize: Lyndhurst Foundation, 1985–1988.
