= Children of War (2009 film) =

- Directed by: Bryan Single
- Produced by: Bryan Single; Farzad Karimi; Timothy Beckett
- Cinematography: Bryan Single
- Edited by: Bryan Single; Timothy Beckett
- Music by: Mark Brandon Hill; James Makubuya
- Release date: November 2009 (United States Institute of Peace)
- Running time: 75 minutes
- Country: United States
- Language: English

Children of War is a 2009 documentary film directed by Bryan Single. Filmed in northern Uganda over a period of three years, the story follows the journey of a group of former child soldiers as they undergo a process of trauma therapy and emotional healing while in a rehabilitation center.

Having been abducted from their homes and schools by the Lord’s Resistance Army—a quasi-religious militia led by international war criminal and self-proclaimed prophet Joseph Kony—the children struggle to confront years of brutal abuse, forced combat and religious indoctrination with the help of a heroic team of trauma counselors. As these fearless allies guide the children forward into new lives, Children Of War illuminates a powerful and cathartic story of forgiveness and hope in the aftermath of war.

== Historical perspective ==
The war in northern Uganda lasted for over two decades (1986–2006). The rebels of the Lord's Resistance Army, led by Joseph Kony, fought to overthrow the secular government and rule the country by the Biblical Ten Commandments. However, what made the LRA so unique and tragic is that the majority of those who fought in its ranks were children.

During the 20 years of war, an estimated 35,000 boys and girls were dragged from their homes, schools and villages, tied up, and marched to rebel hideouts deep in the indigenous bush. There, they were initiated into the Army's cult-like culture through a combination of religious indoctrination, traumatizing abuse, and forced participation in extremely brutal violence. Often these child soldiers were forced to kill fellow abducted children, burn and loot villages, and maim civilians—in some instances even their own families. Fear and total dependency upon their captors led many of the abducted children to yield, internalize, and adopt the violent culture of the rebels. Additionally, many of the female children were given to the rebel commanders as "wives" and forced to produce more children.

To establish power and widespread fear among those who refused to show explicit support for them, Kony and his rebels mainly targeted civilians, employing massacres of the most horrifying nature. Fathers, mothers, and infants were killed, dismembered by machetes, or burned to "rid the land of evil spirits." "In some cases, children were deliberately targeted: their iconic value as representatives of both innocence and society's future renders them potent in pressuring populations." This campaign of terror resulted in over 100,000 deaths, thousands of maimed and wounded, and one and a half million people being forced to live in squalid displaced-persons camps. To make matters worse, the southern-ruled government was widely accused of amplifying the crisis through years of complacency and indifference. In 2006, Jan Egeland, former United Nations Special Advisor to the Secretary General, expressed that the situation in northern Uganda had evolved into "the world's greatest neglected humanitarian crisis."

Since 2006, the war however has settled into a precarious impasse. As a result of an increased military campaign by the Ugandan government, attacks and abductions by the rebels have slowly waned. Kony and his army have moved their base of operations across the border into eastern Democratic Republic of the Congo.

In the heart of this uncertainty between peace and war, life and death, hope and hopelessness, many child soldiers have re-emerged from the war, either through miraculous escapes or by being captured during battles. Transferred directly from the battlefields to rehabilitation centers, these boys and girls undergo the formidable process of healing into a life beyond war. Most carry with them the emotional and psychological burdens of a stained youth, reflected in symptoms of distrust, severe guilt, fear, self-contempt, and despair. But as survivors, many exhibit a haunting yet impassioned honesty far beyond their years.

In May 2006, filmmaker Bryan Single was invited to visit the Rachele Rehabilitation Center in war-torn northern Uganda. Established in 2003 by the Belgium government and award-winning author-journalist Els de Temmerman, the mission of the Rachele Center is to rehabilitate and reintegrate many of the former abductees and child soldiers. The goal of Mr. Single’s visit to the Center was to listen, to witness and to document the stories and sojourns of these children as they recover from their lives as child soldiers.

== Screenings and accolades ==
Children of War premiered in November 2009 at the United States Institute of Peace in Washington D.C. The International Reporting Project co-hosted the screening. In December 2009, it had a special presentation at the historic Hollywood Egyptian Theater as part of the 6th Annual International Artivist Film Festival, where it won the Best Feature Award for Child Advocacy. In February 2010, it was awarded a Justice Award by the Cinema for Peace Foundation in Berlin by Luis Moreno-Ocampo, the chief prosecutor of the International Criminal Court. In March, it was awarded the Foundation Barbara Hendricks Prize in honor of Sergio Vieira de Mello at the International Festival of Human Rights in Geneva, Switzerland. In April 2010, Children Of War, hosted by Cinema for Peace and Amnesty International, was selected to be the first film to screen at the headquarters of the International Criminal Court in The Hague. In May 2010, a preview of Children of War was screened at the historic, International Criminal Court Review Conference Opening Dinner in Kampala, Uganda, followed by a powerful speech by Children of War child trauma counselor Jane Ekayu. UN Secretary-General Ban Ki-moon, former Nuremberg trial prosecutor Benjamin Ferencz, and Bianca Jagger were among those present.

In October 2010, Children of War had its World Premiere before an international audience at the United Nations General Assembly Hall in New York City. Delegates from over forty countries attended the event, which was introduced by UN Deputy Secretary-General Asha-Rose Migiro, hosted by the UN Office of the Secretary-General for Children and Armed Conflict and its Under-Secretary General Radhika Coomaraswamy, and moderated by Democracy Now! journalist Amy Goodman. The internationally renowned Ugandan musician Geoffrey Oryema, who is best known for his collaborations with Peter Gabriel and Real World, closed the evening with a special musical performance. The event was coordinated to support the United Nations' Zero Under 18 campaign, which aims at the universal ratification of the Optional Protocol on the Involvement of Children in Armed Conflict.

In December 2010, "Children of War" was the first film to be screened by the United Nations Office of the High Commissioner for Human Rights and the European Commission in celebration of Human Rights Day. The sold-out event, which took place in Brussels, Belgium at the Palais des Beaux-Arts, was introduced by Bianca Jagger.

In September 2011, "Children of War" director Bryan Single was honored with the Armin T. Wegner Humanitarian Award for "the vision to see the truth, and the courage to speak it." The award ceremony was hosted by the Arpa Foundation for Film and Art at the Egyptian Theater in Hollywood, California.

== Distribution ==
Children of War has been archived in hundreds of educational and institutional libraries worldwide and is distributed by New Day Films and Kanopy.
