= P. W. Singer =

American political scientist

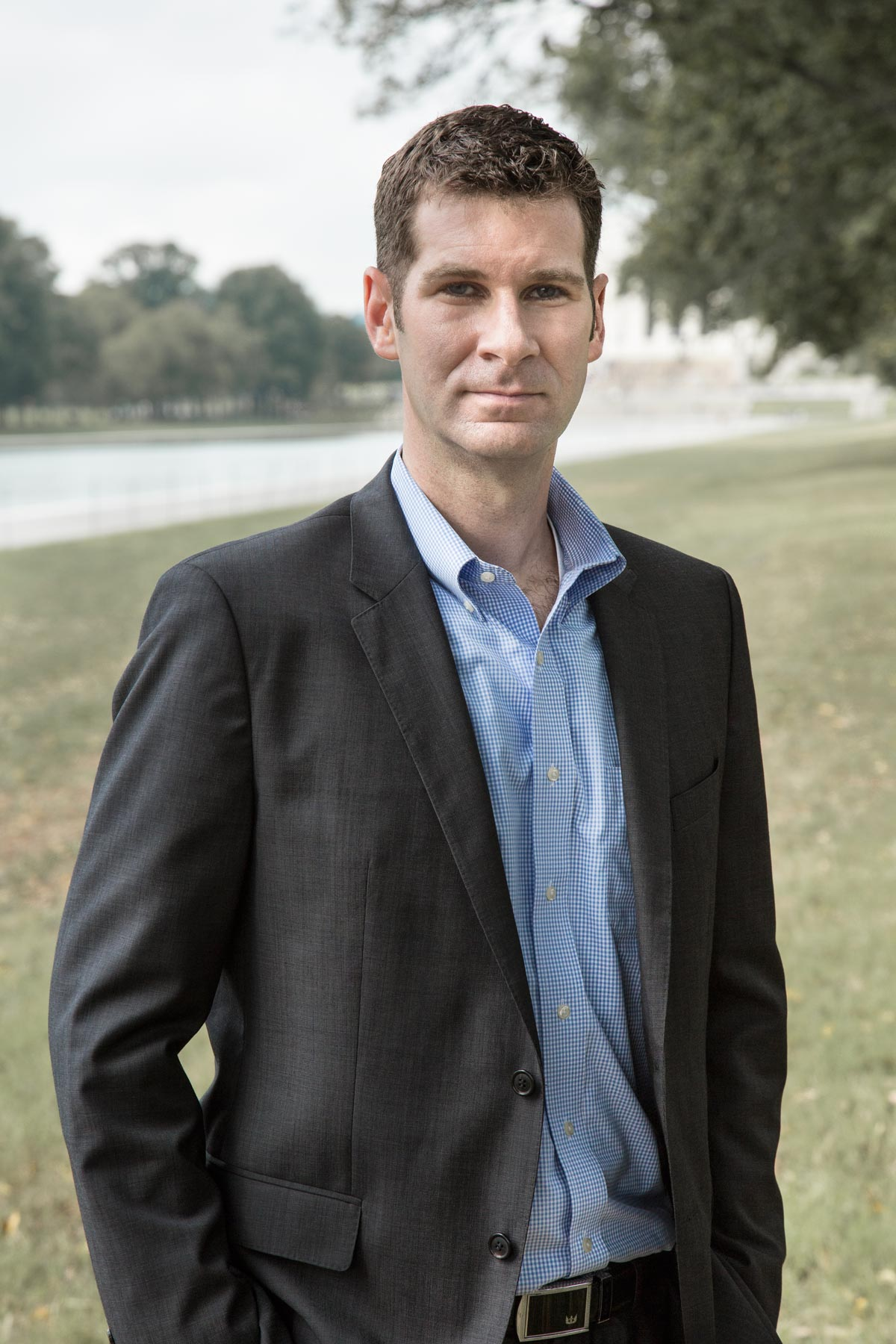
- Born: Peter Warren Singer; 1974 (age 51–52)
- Education: Princeton University (BA); Harvard University (PhD)
- Known for: Corporate Warriors, Children at War, Wired For War
- Scientific career
- Fields: Political Science, International Relations, Modern warfare
- Workplaces: Brookings Institution; Harvard University; U.S. Department of Defense; International Peace Academy

Peter Warren Singer (born 1974) is an American political scientist, an international relations scholar and a specialist on 21st-century warfare. He is also a New York Times bestselling author.

== Career ==
Singer is currently a Strategist for the New America Foundation, a Professor of Practice at Arizona State University, and a founder of Useful Fiction LLC. He has also received the title of a "mad scientist" for the US Army's Training and Doctrine Command. Singer previously worked at the Harvard University Belfer Center, the Office of the Secretary of Defense, and was senior fellow at the Brookings Institution, where he was director of the Center for 21st Century Security and Intelligence. Singer also served as coordinator of the Defense Policy Task Force for Barack Obama's 2008 presidential campaign as well as contributing editor for Popular Science.

Singer has been named to the "Top 100 Global Thinkers" list by Foreign Policy. Defense News named him one of the 100 most influential people on defense issues. He also served on the advisory group for Joint Forces Command, helping the U.S. military visualize and plan for the future. In 2015, he was named by Onalytica analysis as one of the ten most influential voices on cybersecurity. In addition to his work on conflict issues, Singer was a member of the State Department's Advisory Committee on International Communications and Information Policy.

Singer has provided commentary on technology and military affairs for media outlets including ABC News Nightline, Al Jazeera, BBC, CBS-60 Minutes, CNN, Fox, NPR, The Daily Show, and the NBC Today Show.

He is also a founder and organizer of multiple non-profit initiatives. They include the U.S.–Islamic World Forum, a global conference that brings together leaders from across the United States and the Muslim world, the Cyber Citizenship initiative, which seeks to build skills among K-12 students to have greater resilience from online threats of misinformation and disinformation, and the #ShareTheMicInCyber Fellowship, which support professionals from traditionally underrepresented communities in the field of cybersecurity.

Singer has also worked with a variety of entertainment world projects for Warner Brothers, DreamWorks, and Universal, including the movies Traitor, and Whistleblower, the TV series Strike Back and Curiosity, as well as the 24: Redemption movie/DVD. Singer served as consultant on the bestselling Activision video game series Call of Duty.

== Books ==
=== Corporate Warriors: The Rise of the Privatized Military Industry ===
Corporate Warriors: The Rise of the Privatized Military Industry (2003, Cornell University Press, ISBN 0801441145)

=== Children at War ===
Children at War (2005, Pantheon, ISBN 9780520248762)

=== Wired for War ===
Wired for War: The Robotics Revolution and Conflict in the 21st Century (Penguin, 2009, ISBN 9781594201981)

=== Cybersecurity and Cyberwar: What Everyone Needs to Know ===
Cybersecurity and Cyberwar: What Everyone Needs to Know (Oxford University Press, 2014, ISBN 9780199918096)

=== Ghost Fleet: A Novel of the Next World War ===
Ghost Fleet: A Novel of the Next World War (Eamon Dolan/Houghton Mifflin Harcourt, 2015, ISBN 0544142845)

=== LikeWar: The Weaponization of Social Media ===
LikeWar: The Weaponization of Social Media (Eamon Dolan/Houghton Mifflin Harcourt, 2018, ISBN 9781328695741)

=== Burn-In: A Novel of the Real Robotic Revolution ===
Burn-In: A Novel of the Real Robotic Revolution (Houghton Mifflin Harcourt, 2020, ISBN 9781328637239)

=== Task Force Talon: A Novel of the Army's Next Fight ===
Task Force Talon: A Novel of the Army's Next Fight is an upcoming novel by Singer and August Cole.

== See also ==
- The Brookings Institution
- Military use of children
